= Eurocommerce =

European business organization

EuroCommerce
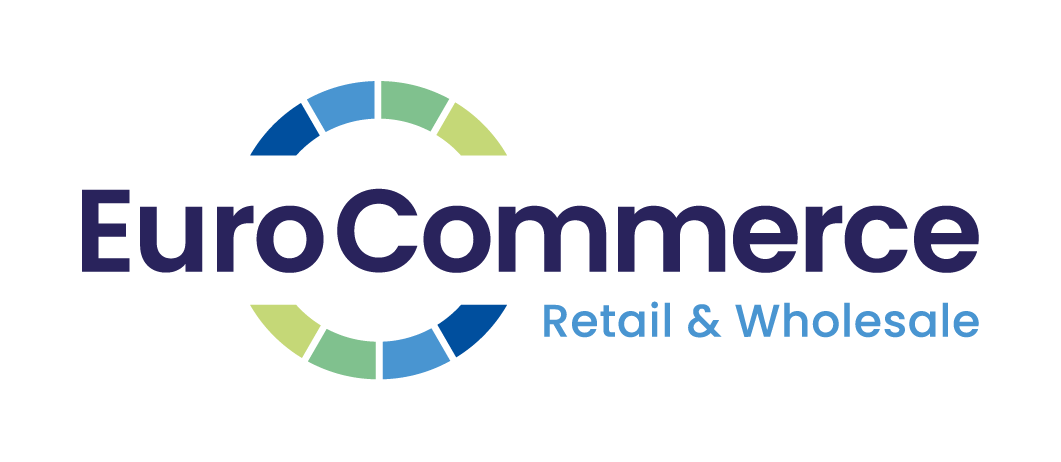
- Formation: 1993
- Registration no.: 84973761187-60
- Legal status: Non-profit organisation
- Headquarters: Avenue des Nerviens 85, 1040 Brussels, Belgium
- Region served: Europe
- Members: European retail and wholesale companies and federations
- President: Juan Manuel Morales
- Director General: Christel Delberghe
- Website: eurocommerce.eu

EuroCommerce is the principal European organisation representing the retail and wholesale sector. It is led by the Director General.

It gathers members in about 27 countries: representing mostly SMEs and some large companies and federations of companies at a European or national level.

EuroCommerce represents one in seven jobs (up to 26 million employees) in Europe. It supports millions of further jobs throughout the supply chain, from small local suppliers to international businesses.

EuroCommerce is the recognised European social partner for the retail and wholesale sector.

== History ==
EuroCommerce was founded in 1993, as a result of merging three pre-existing large retail chains, small retail operators and wholesalers and traders. It brings together European and national associations representing various aspects of retail and wholesale and international trade to form a single voice for the sector in Brussels.

Its first president (from 1993 to 1994) and driving force behind the creation of EuroCommerce, was Dr Albert Heijn (1927–2011), the chairman of the major Dutch retailer Ahold.

== Policy areas ==
EuroCommerce brings together the expertise of its members and secretariat to help inform and contribute to debate in a range of policies, including competitiveness and the economy, the digital economy, single market, global trade, environment and sustainability, social policy and industrial relations, food and non-food, enterprise and SMEs.

== List of presidents ==
Presidents	Nationality	Mandates
Juan Manuel Morales	Spain	2021–2024
Régis Degelcke	France	2018–2021
Kenneth Bengtsson	Sweden	2015–2018
Carl Hugo Erbslöh	Germany	2014–2015
Lucy Neville-Rolfe	United Kingdom	2012–2014
Reinhardt Von Leoprechting	Germany	2009–2012
Feargal Quinn	Ireland	2006–2009
Peter Bernert	Austria	2003–2006
Paul-Louis Halley	France	2000–2003
Igino Sogaro	Italy	1997–2000
Jacques Dopchie	Belgium	1994–1997
Albert Heijn Jr.	Netherlands	1993–1994

== Members ==
The membership of EuroCommerce is composed of National Associations, Companies (founded in a European country or International companies with an HQ in Europe) and Affiliated Federations (whether they operate at a national or European level).

As of July 2021, the members are:

=== National Associations ===
National Associations	Country
Wirtschaftskammer Österreich (WKÖ)	Austria
Comeos	Belgium
Association Modern Trade (AMT)	Bulgaria
Cyprus Chamber of Commerce and Industry (CCCI)	Cyprus
Hrvatska Gospodarska Komora (HGK)	Croatia
Croatian Employers' Association (HUP)	Croatia
Svaz obchodu a cestovního ruchu ČR (SOCR ČR)	Czech Republic
Dansk Erhverv	Denmark
Eesti Kaupmeeste Liit (EKL)	Estonia
Kauppa	Finland
Fedération des Entreprises du Commerce et de la Distribution (FCD)	France
Conseil du Commerce de France (CDCF)	France
Bundesverband Großhandel, Außenhandel, Dienstleistungen (BGA)	Germany
Handelsverband Deutschland (HDE)	Germany
Hellenic Confederation of Commerce & Entrepreneurship (ESEE)	Greece
Országos Kereskedelmi Szövetség (OKSZ)	Hungary
Vállalkozók és Munkáltatók Országos Szövetsége (VOSZ)	Hungary
Samtök verslunar og þjónustu (SVÞ)	Iceland
Retail Ireland	Ireland
Federdistribuzione	Italy
Confcommercio	Italy
Lietuvos prekybos įmonių asociacija	Lithuania
Commerce transport services (CLC)	Luxembourg
Raad Nederlandse Detailhandel (RND)	Netherlands
MKB-Nederland	Netherlands
Virke Hovedorganisasjonen (VIRKE)	Norway
Polska Organizacja Handlu i Dystrybucji (POHID)	Poland
Associação Portuguesa de Empresas de Distribuição (APED)	Portugal
Confederação do Comércio e Serviços de Portugal (CCP)	Portugal
Asociaţia Marilor Reţele Comerciale din România (AMRCR)	Romania
Slovenská aliancia moderného obchodu (SAMO)	Slovakia
Trgovinska zbornica Slovenije (TSZ)	Slovenia
Asociación Nacional de Grandes Empresas de Distribución (ANGED)	Spain
Asociación Española de Distribuidores, Autoservicios y Supermercados (ASEDAS)	Spain
Asociación de Cadenas Españolas de Supemercados (ACES)	Spain
Svensk Handel	Sweden

=== Companies ===
Company	Country of origin or European HQ
Ahold Delhaize	Netherlands
Aldi	Germany
Amazon	Europe
AS Watson Group	United Kingdom
Auchan	France
Carrefour	France
CECONOMY	Germany
Colruyt	Belgium
Coop	Switzerland
Decathlon	France
EDEKA	Germany
El Corte Inglés	Spain
Esselunga	Italy
Grupo IFA	Spain
H&M	Sweden
Herbalife Nutrition	Europe
ICA Gruppen	Sweden
Ikea	Sweden
Ikea Range & Supply	Sweden
Inditex	Spain
Jerónimo Martins	Portugal
Kappé International	Netherlands
Kesko Corporation	Finland
Kingfisher PLC	United Kingdom
Markant	Germany
Mercadona	Spain
Marks & Spencer	United Kingdom
METRO AG	Germany
Musgrave Group	Ireland
Primark	United Kingdom
REWE Group	Germany
Schwarz Gruppe	Germany
Sonae	Portugal
SPAR Austria	Austria
Tesco	United Kingdom
Walgreens Boots Alliance	United Kingdom

=== Affiliated Federations ===
Affiliated Federations	Geographical scope
Centraal Bureau Levensmiddelenhandel	Netherlands
Direct Selling Europe	Europe
Ecommerce Europe	Europe
European DIY-Retail Association	Europe
European Travel Retail Council	Europe
European Consumer Electronics Retail Council	Europe
European Union of Electrical Wholesalers	Europe
European Association of National Builders	Europe
European Franchise Federation	Europe
European Healthcare Distribution Association	Europe
European Association of Chemical Distributors	Europe
The Direct Selling Association	Europe
Piraeus Chamber of Commerce & Industry	Greece
Athens Chamber of Commerce & Industry	Greece
Svensk Dagligvaruhandel	Sweden
