= Ahold =

Former Dutch multinational retail company

Koninklijke Ahold N.V.

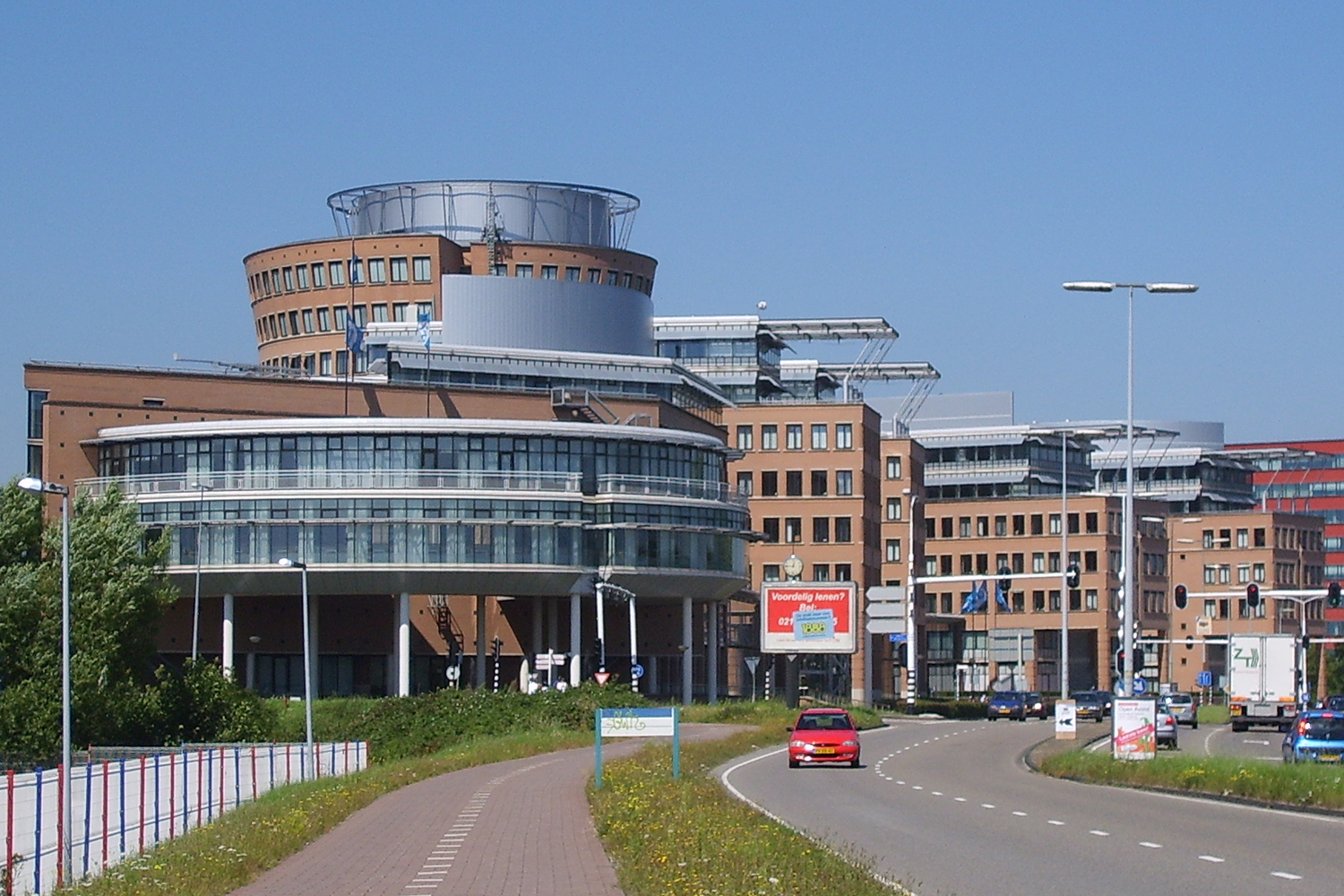
- The former Ahold headquarters in Zaandam, Netherlands (now headquarters of Ahold Delhaize)
- Type: Public (N.V.)
- Traded as: Euronext Amsterdam: AH
- ISIN: NL0011794037
- Industry: Retail
- Founded: 1887 (139 years ago)
- Defunct: 24 July 2016; 9 years ago
- Fate: Merged with Delhaize
- Successor: Ahold Delhaize
- Headquarters: Zaandam, Netherlands
- Number of locations: 3,206
- Key people: Frans Muller (CEO); Jan Hommen (Chairman of the Supervisory Board)
- Services: Convenience/forecourt store, discount store, drug store/pharmacy, hypermarket/supercenter/superstore, other specialty, supermarket, online retailer
- Revenue: €38.2 billion (2015)
- Operating income: €1.3 billion (2015)
- Net income: €0.85 billion (2015)
- Total assets: €15.88 billion (2015)
- Total equity: €5.62 billion (2015)
- Number of employees: 236,000 (2015)
- Website: www.ahold.com

Koninklijke Ahold N.V. was a Dutch multinational retail company based in Zaandam, Netherlands. Founded in 1887 by Albert Heijn Sr., the company initially began as a single grocery store in Oostzaan and became the largest grocery chain in the Netherlands in the 1970s. The company went public in 1948. It merged with Belgium-based Delhaize Group in 2016 to form Ahold Delhaize.

== History ==
=== Growth in the Netherlands ===
The company started in 1887, when Albert Heijn Sr. opened the first Albert Heijn grocery store in Oostzaan, Netherlands. The grocery chain expanded through the first half of the 20th century and went public in 1948.

Under the leadership of the founder's grandsons, Albert Jr. and Gerrit Jan Heijn, the company continued to make a significant impact on food retail in the Netherlands in the next four decades, pioneering self-service shopping and the development of private labels and of non-food as a grocery store category. The company also influenced culinary development in the country, popularizing products such as wine, sherry, and kiwi fruit, contributing to the introduction of the refrigerator in Dutch households, and introducing convenience items, such as ready meals and frozen pizzas, to Dutch consumers.

Albert Heijn became the largest grocery chain in the Netherlands during this time and expanded into liquor stores and health and beauty care stores in the 1970s. In 1973, the holding company Albert Heijn changed its name to "Ahold", an abbreviation of Albert Heijn Holding".

=== International expansion ===
In the 1970s, the company began expanding internationally, acquiring companies in Spain and the United States. Under a new leadership team, which for the first time did not include any members of the Heijn family, the company accelerated its growth through acquisitions in the latter half of the 1990s in Latin America, Central Europe, and Asia.

Ahold N.V. received the designation "Royal" from Dutch Queen Beatrix in 1987, awarded to companies that have operated honorably for one hundred years. That same year Gerrit Jan Heijn, Ahold executive and only brother of Albert Heijn, was kidnapped for ransom and murdered.

=== Accounting crisis ===
The announcement of accounting irregularities at some of Ahold's subsidiaries in February 2003 halted the company's ambitious global expansion. The CEO, Cees van der Hoeven, and CFO, Michael Meurs, and a number of senior management resigned as a result, and earnings over 2001 and 2002 had to be restated. The main accounting irregularities occurred at U.S. Foodservice (now US Foods) and, on a smaller scale, Tops Markets in the United States, where income related to promotional allowances was overstated. In addition, accounting irregularities were found at the company's Argentine subsidiary, Disco, and it was determined that the financial results of certain joint ventures had been accounted for improperly.

As a result of the announcements, the company's share price plunged by two-thirds, and its credit rating was reduced to BB+ by Standard & Poor's.

=== Legal ramifications ===
The irregularities led to various investigations and criminal charges by both Dutch and U.S. law enforcement authorities against Ahold and several of its former executives.

Dutch law enforcement authorities filed fraud charges against Ahold, which were settled in September 2004, when Ahold paid a fine of approximately €8 million. Ahold's former CEO, CFO, and the former executive in charge of its European activities were charged with fraud by the Dutch authorities. In May 2006, a Dutch appeals court found Ahold's former CEO and CFO guilty of false authentication of documents, and they received suspended prison sentences and unconditional fines.

The United States Securities and Exchange Commission (SEC) announced in October 2004, that it had completed its investigation and reached a final settlement with Ahold.

In January 2006, Ahold announced that it had reached a settlement of US$1.1 billion (€937 million) in a securities class action lawsuit filed against the company in the United States by shareholders and former shareholders. Another class action lawsuit was filed against Ahold's auditors, Deloitte, but this suit was dismissed. The suit was brought up again by shareholders in 2007, and by a different shareholder group in 2012.

The SEC filed fraud charges against four former executives of U.S. Foodservice: the company's former CFO, former chief marketing officer, and two former purchasing executives. The purchasing executives settled the charges. The former chief marketing officer was sentenced to 46 months in prison. The former CFO was sentenced to six months of home detention and three years' probation.

=== Road to recovery ===
Anders Moberg became CEO on 5 May 2003. Under his and other new leadership appointed following the crisis, Ahold launched a "Road to Recovery" strategy in late 2003 to restore its financial health, regain credibility, and strengthen its business.

As part of this strategy, Ahold announced it would divest all operations in markets where it could not achieve a sustainable number one or two position within three to five years, and that could not meet defined profitability and return criteria over time. The company divested all its operations in South America and Asia, retaining a core group of profitable companies in Europe and the United States. As part of its Road to Recovery strategy, Ahold strengthened accountability, controls and corporate governance and restored its financial health, regaining investment grade in 2007.

=== Strategy for profitable growth ===
In November 2006, Ahold announced the results of a major strategic review of its businesses. As a result of this review, Ahold launched its strategy for profitable growth focused on strengthening its retail competitive position, particularly in the United States. The company focused on building its brands by creating an improved product and service offering, delivered an improved price position and lowered operating expenses, and reorganized the company into two continental organizations led by chief operating officers. As part of the strategy, Ahold further focused its portfolio, including the divestment of U.S. Foodservice (completed in July 2007, to CD&R and KKR for US$7.1 billion), Tops (completed in December 2007, for US$310 million to Morgan Stanley Private Equity) and the company's operations in Poland (completed in July 2007, to Carrefour). The company made solid progress in delivering its strategy under the leadership of John Rishton, appointed CEO in November 2007, who had been part of the team that developed the strategy in his previous role as CFO.

In November 2011, under the leadership of Dick Boer, appointed CEO in March 2011, Ahold announced a new phase of its growth strategy, "Reshaping Retail". This strategy has six pillars—three designed to create growth and three to enable this growth. The six pillars are increasing customer loyalty, broadening our offering, expanding geographic reach, simplicity, responsible retailing, and our people.

=== Merger with Delhaize Group ===
On 24 June 2015, Delhaize Group reached an agreement with Ahold to merge, forming a new company, Ahold Delhaize. At completion of the merger, Ahold shareholders will own 61% of the new combined company, while Delhaize Group shareholders will hold the remaining 39%. Ahold CEO Dick Boer will become CEO of the merged company, with Frans Muller, CEO of Delhaize to become deputy CEO and chief integration officer.

== Assets ==
A list of assets (formally) owned by Ahold.

Asset (also known as)	Share	Type	Country	Period	Fate
Albert Heijn AH To Go, AH XL, AH Online	100%	Supermarket	Netherlands	1887–2016	Merged with Ahold Delhaize
Albert Heijn AH To Go, AH XL, AH Online	100%	Supermarket	Germany	2011–2016	Merged with Ahold Delhaize
Albert Heijn AH To Go, AH XL, AH Online	100%	Supermarket	Belgium	2011–2016	Merged with Ahold Delhaize
Ahold Coffee Company Marvelo	100%	Roastery	Netherlands	1895/1910–2016	Merged with Ahold Delhaize
AC Restaurants Alberts Corner	100%	Restaurant chain	Netherlands	1963–1989	Management buy-out / sold to an investment company
Miro	100%	Hypermarkets	Netherlands	1971–1987	Formula shut down, stores remodelled to different Ahold formulas.
McDonald's Netherlands Family Food	50%	Fast food chain	Netherlands	1971–1975	Sold to McDonalds
Simon de Wit	100%	Supermarket	Netherlands	1972–1980	Merged with Albert Heijn
S-Discounts	100%	Discountstore	Netherlands	1972–1980	Shut down
Nettomarkten	100%	Hypermarkets	Netherlands	1972–1982	Sold
Toko Kampwinkels	100%	Camping store	Netherlands	1972–1988	Sold
Ostara	100%	Holidayparks	Netherlands	1972–1989	Sold
Ter Huurne	100%	Supermarket	Netherlands	1972–2014	Sold
Alberto	100%	Liquor Store	Netherlands	1974–1989	Merged with Gall & Gall
Lita	100%	Catalog Store	Netherlands	1973–1976	Sold
Jobby	100%	D.I.Y. Store	Netherlands	1973–1979	Shut down
Etos	100%	Drugstore	Netherlands	1973–2016	Merged with Ahold Delhaize
Etos	100%	Drugstore	Belgium	1988–1995	Sold
CadaDia	100%	Supermarket	Spain	1976–1985	Shut down
Bi-Lo	100%	Supermarket	United States	1977–2004	Sold
Giant Food Stores	100%	Supermarket	United States	1981–2016	Merged with Ahold Delhaize
d' Swarte Walvis De Walvis	100%	Restaurant	Netherlands	1984–2003	Sold to Nedstede Groep
DeliXL Grootverbruik Ahold	100%		Netherlands; Belgium	1985–2009	Sold to Bidvest Group
Edwards	100%	Supermarket	United States	1988–1995	Merged with Stop & Shop
Finast	100%	Supermarket	United States	1988–1994	Merged with Edwards
Pragmacare	100%	Pharmaceutical	Netherlands	1988–1995	Sold
Schuitema	73%	Wholesale and distribution	Netherlands	1988–2008	Sold
Gall & Gall	100%	Liquor Store	Netherlands	1989–2016	Merged with Ahold Delhaize
Party Shop	100%	Liquor Store	Netherlands	1989–1989	Merged with Gall & Gall
Tops Markets	100%	Supermarket	United States	1991–2006	Sold
Albert	100%	Supermarket	Czech Republic	1991–2016	Merged with Ahold Delhaize
De Tuinen	100%	Drugstore	Netherlands	1991–2003	Sold to Holland & Barrett
Pingo Doce	49%	Supermarket	Portugal	1992–2016	Merged with Ahold Delhaize
Feira Nova	100%	Supermarket	Portugal	1993–2010	Merged with Pingo Doce
Funchalgest	45% (1995) 50% (1999)	Supermarket	Portugal	1995–2009	Merged with Pingo Doce
Jamin	100%	Candystore	Netherlands	1993–2003	Management buy-out
Red Food Stores	100%	Supermarket	United States	1994–1994	Merged with Bi-Lo
Ahold Polska	50% (1995) 100% (1998)	Supermarket	Poland	1995–2007	Sold
Stop & Shop	100%	Supermarket	United States	1995–2016	Merged with Ahold Delhaize
Tops	65% (1996) 100% (2000)	Supermarket	Malaysia	1996–2003	Sold to Giant
Tops	50%	Supermarket	Thailand	1996–2004	Sold to Central Group
Tops	70% (1996) 100% (2002)	Supermarket	Indonesia	1996–2003	Sold to PT Hero Supermarket
Tops	50%	Supermarket	China	1996–1999	Sold
Tops	50%	Supermarket	Singapore	1996–1999	Sold
Bompreco	100%	Supermarket	Brazil	1996–2004	Sold to Wal-Mart
Hipercard	100%	Banking	Brazil	1996–2004	Sold to Unibanco
Store 2000	50%	Supermarket	Spain	1997–1997	Sold to Caprabo
Disco International Holdings	50%				
Disco	90%	Supermarket	Argentina	1998–2005	Sold to Cencosud
Santa Isabel	65%	Supermarket	Chile	1998–2003	Sold to Cencosud
Santa Isabel	65%	Supermarket	Paraguay	1998–2003	Sold to A.J. Viervi
Santa Isabel	65%	Supermarket	Peru	1998–2003	Sold to Grupo Interbank and Nexus Group
Paiz Ahold	50%			1999–2005	Sold
CARHCO	67%			1999–2005	Sold
CSU International	100%	Discoutstores Supermarkets Hypermarket	Costa Rica; Nicaragua; Honduras	1999–2005	Sold
La Frague	85,6%	Discoutstores Supermarkets Hypermarket	Guatemala; El Salvador; Honduras	1999–2005	Sold
Dialco	100%	Supermarket	Spain	1999–2004	Sold
Dumaya	100%	Supermarket	Spain	1999–2004	Sold
Guerrero	100%	Supermarket	Spain	1999–2004	Sold
Castillo del Barrio	100%	Supermarket	Spain	1999–2004	Sold
Longinos Velasco	100%	Supermarket	Spain	1999–2004	Sold
U.S. Foodservice	100%	Foodservice Distributor	United States	1999–2007	Sold
Peapod	51% (2000) 100% (2001)	Online Grocer	United States	2000–2016	Merged with Ahold Delhaize
Golden Gallon	100%	Gas stations	United States	2000–2003	Sold
ICA	50% (2000) 60% (2004)	Supermarket Hypermarket Banking	Sweden; Norway; Estonia; Latvia; Lithuania	2000–2013	Sold
Bruno's	100%	Supermarket	United States	2001–2001	Merged with Bi-Lo
Ahold Slovakia	100%	Supermarket	Slovakia	2001–2013	Sold
G. Barbosa	100%	Supermarket	Brazil	2001–2005	Sold to AON Invests
Bol.com	100%	Webshop	Netherlands; Belgium	2012–2016	Merged with Ahold Delhaize

== Major shareholders in Ahold ==
Ahold's major shareholders were:

- Stichting Administratiekantoor Preferente Financieringsaandelen Ahold (Capital interest: 20.19%; Voting rights: 6.55%)
- Mondrian Investment Partners Limited (Capital interest: 4.26%; Voting rights: 4.99%)
- ING Groep N.V (Capital interest: 9.26%; Voting rights: 4.92%)
- Blackrock, Inc (Capital interest: 2.99%; Voting rights: 4.46%)
- Deutsche Bank AG (Capital interest: 3.63%; Voting rights: 4.26%)
- DeltaFort Beleggingen B.V. (Capital interest: 11.23%; Voting rights: 3.82%)
- Silchester International Investors LLP (Capital interest: 3.00%; Voting rights: 3.52%)

== Key people ==
- Frans W. H. Muller (born 1961), chief executive officer since March 2018.
- Jeff Carr (17 September 1961), chief financial officer since November 2011.
- Hanneke Faber (19 April 1969), chief commercial officer since September 2013 (until end of 2017).
- James McCann (4 October 1969), chief operating officer Ahold USA since February 2013.
- Wouter Kolk (26 April 1966) chief operating officer Ahold Netherlands since February 2015.
- Jan Ernst de Groot (11 April 1965), chief legal officer since February 2015.
- Abbe Luersman (4 December 1967), chief human resources officer.

== See also ==
- European Round Table

== Sources ==
- Helsingin Sanomat (daily, print version, 15 June 2004)
