= Albert Heijn (disambiguation) =

Albert Heijn is a supermarket chain in the Netherlands.

Albert Heijn may also refer to:

- Albert Heijn (businessman) (1865–1945), Dutch entrepreneur and original founder of the Albert Heijn supermarket chain
- Albert Heijn Jr. (1927–2011), Dutch entrepreneur, grandson of Albert Heijn
