= European Retail Round Table =

Defunct European retail trade association

- Abbreviation: ERRT
- Merged into: EuroCommerce
- Formation: 1999; 27 years ago
- Dissolved: 2020; 6 years ago
- Type: Trade association
- Headquarters: Brussels, Belgium
- Region served: Europe
- Website: errt.org (archived)

The European Retail Round Table (ERRT) was a Brussels-based association that brought together the chief executives of major European retail groups to engage with EU institutions on single market, competition, sustainability and supply-chain issues. It merged into EuroCommerce in November 2019 and ceased operations in 2020.

== History ==
ERRT was active by 1999 and was based at Square de Meeûs 35, Brussels. Its policy work addressed the European single market for retail, including digital and cross-border issues, as set out in a 2015 position paper to the European Commission.

In 1999 ERRT convened a GMO working group (chaired by Lucy Neville-Rolfe of Tesco) and, in consultation with EuroCommerce, issued a discussion paper on GMOs in food setting out retailers’ views on labelling and risk communication. The paper supported an EU-wide labelling regime (including derivatives and additives), a very low threshold for adventitious presence, validated testing methods, and segregation/traceability along the supply chain; it also reported several large retailers removing GM ingredients from own-brand products in response to consumer concerns.

ERRT was a founding association behind The Supply Chain Initiative (2013), promoting fair-trading practices across the food supply chain; worked with the Commission and EuroCommerce on the Retail Forum for Sustainability and the Retailers’ Environmental Action Programme (REAP); and acted as secretariat to the Timber Retail Coalition (Carrefour, IKEA, Kingfisher, Marks & Spencer), which advocated EU rules on legally and responsibly sourced timber. Under the Retail Forum for Sustainability, ERRT coordinated the voluntary Retail Agreement on Waste and published a 2016 report summarising signatories’ actions to prevent and reduce waste across operations and supply chains.

On 7 November 2019, ERRT and EuroCommerce announced that they would merge their activities, with ERRT's functions integrated into EuroCommerce; ERRT ceased operations in 2020.

== Members ==
Company	Membership	Notes
Ahold Delhaize	1999–2020	As Royal Ahold until 2016, when merged with Delhaize Group.
C&A	1999–2018	
Carrefour	1999–2016	
Delhaize Group	1999–2016	Merged with Royal Ahold in 2016.
Dixons Group	1999–2009	Rebranded as DSG international in 2005; now Currys plc.
Kingfisher plc	1999–2012	
Marks & Spencer	1999–2019	
Metro AG	1999–2019	
J Sainsbury	1999–2005	
Promodès	1999	Merged into Carrefour in 1999.
Tesco	1999–2018	
El Corte Inglés	2000–2020	
IKEA	2000–2019	
Gruppo Coin	2002–2004	
Asda	2004–2017	
Inditex	2005–2020	
H&M	2006–2016	
Mercadona	2006–2019	
Auchan	2013–2016	
ICA Gruppen	2013–2020	
Jerónimo Martins	2013–2020	
Lidl	2013–2019	
Dansk Supermarked	2014–2016	Company now known as Salling Group.
Ceconomy	2017–2020	Spun off from Metro AG in 2017.

== See also ==
- EuroCommerce
- European Round Table for Industry
- European Single Market
