= Peapod =

American online grocery delivery service

Peapod Online Grocer (US)
- Type: Subsidiary
- Industry: Online grocer
- Founded: 1989; 37 years ago
- Headquarters: Chicago, Illinois, United States
- Key people: Thomas Parkinson (Co-founder, CTO); Andrew Parkinson (Co-founder)
- Number of employees: 4,600 (2017)
- Parent: Ahold Delhaize
- Website: www.peapod.com

Peapod Online Grocer (US), LLC is an American online grocery delivery service. By February 2022, it changed its name to Peapod Digital Labs.

The company is based in Chicago, Illinois, and operated in several US cities. It is owned by Netherlands-based Ahold Delhaize, which operates Stop & Shop, Food Lion, Giant-Landover in the US, and other supermarkets in the Netherlands, Belgium, Luxembourg, Czech Republic, Greece, Serbia and Romania. It used to deliver from its own Chicago-area and other warehouses in the Midwest until its Midwest operations ceased in early 2020.

Peapod online grocery had operations in 24 US urban markets, and was once the largest online grocery delivery company in the United States.

== History ==
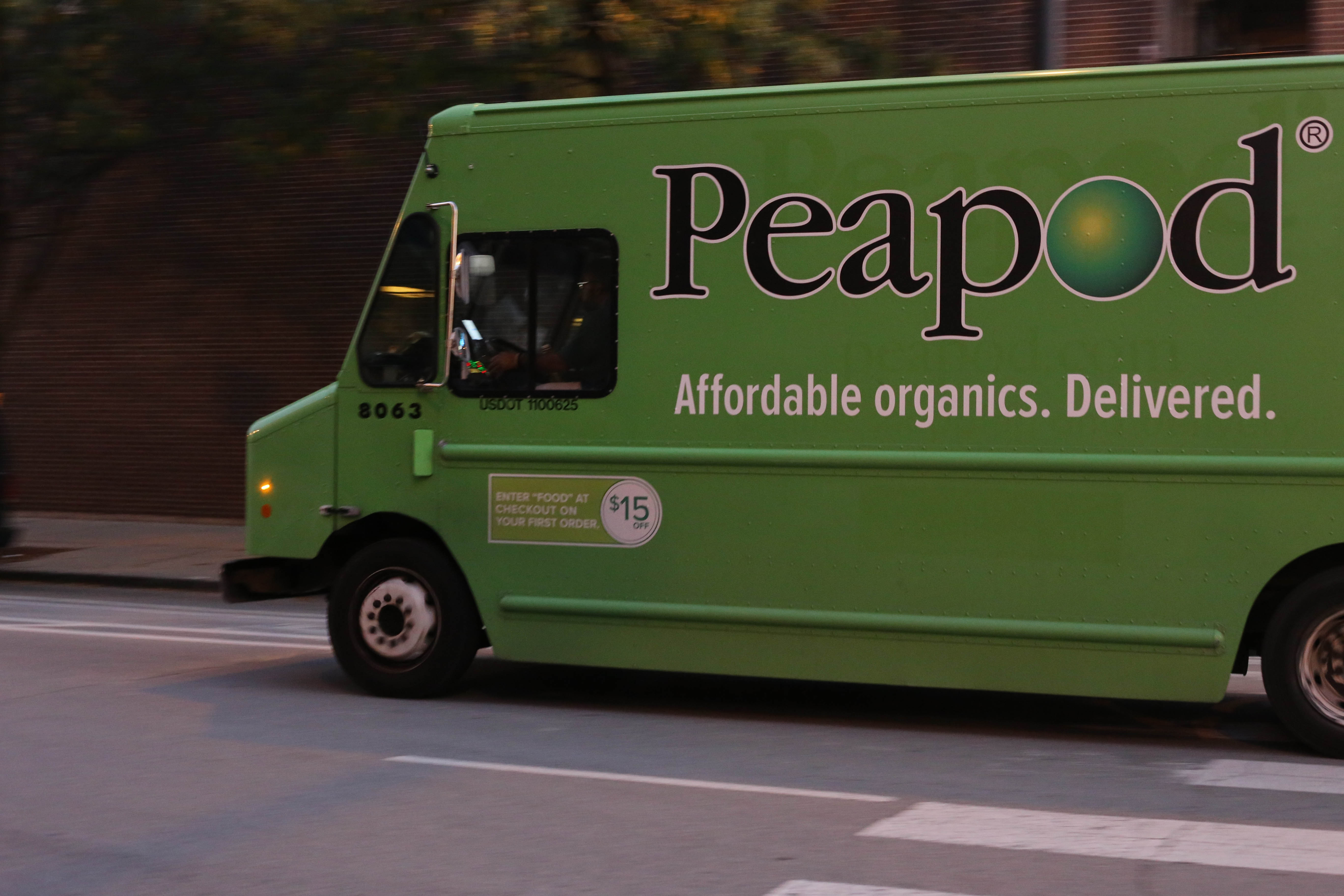
A Peapod delivery truck in Chicago

=== 20th century: Parkinson Family ownership ===
Peapod Online Grocer (US) was founded in 1989 by Andrew Parkinson and Thomas Parkinson. One early proposal for a name for the new company was IPOD, an acronym for Information and Product On Demand. The brothers, taking marketing considerations into account, decided on the friendlier sounding "Peapod" instead. Before 1996, Peapod Online Grocer (US) provided an online grocery shopping service in a partnership with Jewel supermarket in Chicago, Illinois, and surrounding towns; Kroger in Columbus, Ohio, Randall's in Houston, Texas, and Safeway in San Francisco, California, in 1993.

In 1996, the company launched its website and became one of the earliest internet start-ups; the company ranked 69th on the Inc. 500 list of fast-growing privately held US companies. That year the company held an IPO on NASDAQ. Between 1997 and 2000, Peapod expanded into Boston and Watertown, Massachusetts, Long Island, New York, and Norwalk, Connecticut, in partnership with Stop & Shop.

=== 21st century: Ahold then Ahold Delhaize ===
In June 2000, global grocery corporation Royal Ahold bought 51% of Peapod's shares, and in August 2001, Royal Ahold bought out the entire company. As a result, Peapod cancelled its contracts with all grocery companies except for Royal Ahold's three main American chains, Stop & Shop, Giant-Landover and Giant-Carlisle. This caused Peapod to abandon Columbus, Houston, and San Francisco entirely.

In late 2000, Peapod added Washington, D.C., and surrounding towns through Giant of Landover, and in 2011 they also started serving the Philadelphia market with Giant of Carlisle and Manhattan with Stop & Shop.

In February 2012, Peapod introduced signs at some SEPTA Regional Rail stations in Philadelphia which enabled smartphone users to shop for groceries using Peapod's mobile app on their phone and scanning the barcodes of items listed on the signs. The grocery delivery occurred later in the day.

In October 2017, Peapod Online Grocer (US) announced it was moving its headquarters from suburban Skokie, Illinois, to downtown Chicago.

In 2019, Peapod held 9% of the online grocery delivery market in New York City, behind FreshDirect (68%), Instacart (13%), and Amazon Fresh (9%).

In February 2020, Peapod announced they would be ceasing operations in the Midwest (Illinois, Indiana, and Wisconsin) and focus exclusively on serving the East Coast. The headquarters for Peapod Digital Labs, which runs the e-commerce technology for Ahold Delhaize's US grocery brands, remained in downtown Chicago.

== Recognition and awards ==
In 2017, Peapod Online Grocer (US) was described by food website Organic Authority as "one of the oldest and most popular online grocery services in the marketplace."

In 2017, the NPD Group's Chief Food Industry Analyst, Harry Balzer, considers Peapod the top online grocery delivery service and believes that could be used as a model for delivery services, such as Amazon and Walmart, if they move into the business of online groceries.
