= Tom, Dick & Harry Creative Co. =

American advertising agency

- Industry: Advertising
- Founded: 2002; 24 years ago
- Headquarters: Chicago, Illinois

Tom, Dick & Harry Creative, Co. is an American advertising agency in Chicago, Illinois that creates integrated marketing communications programs for both businesses and not-for-profit organizations.

== Overview ==
The 25-person firm was founded in 2002 and has worked for a long list of diverse clients including Bally Total Fitness, Moosehead Beer, Nike, The Evangelical Lutheran Church in America, National PTA, National Geographic Channel and Chicago Bulls but arguably is best known for the highly successful launch of the Big Ten Network (BTN) in 2007. BTN, a joint venture between Fox Sports and the Big Ten Conference, was the first-ever television network to achieve 30 million subscribers in its first 90 days of operation. Former Chicago Sun-Times marketing and media columnist, Lewis Lazare, then writing for ReelChicago.com, referred to Tom, Dick & Harry as one of Chicago's "top agencies."

== Naming ==
The firm's whimsical name is taken from the 1963 Hollywood film, The Great Escape. The film is based on the true story of prisoners of war at Stalag Luft III in Western Poland during World War II who gave the code names "Tom", "Dick" and "Harry" to three escape tunnels. Agency founders, Bob Volkman, Michael Herlehy and David Yang likened The Great Escape to their personal escapes from big, bureaucratic agencies on Chicago's advertising agency row, Michigan Avenue.

== Business ==
Despite the fact that the agency's first twelve years of operation have coincided almost perfectly with the worst American economy since the Great Depression the agency has prospered and was dubbed "The little agency that can perform even in the toughest of times" by Chicago Sun-Times columnist Lewis Lazare. The agency has been recently recognized by the Professional Golf Association for its golf-related public service television announcement for Special Olympics and for the design of its own website and office space. The agency also recently served as creative and production consultant to the producers of "Our Longest Drive" a six-episode series which premiered on Golf Channel Tuesday, October 16, 2012. In 2013 the agency acquired its first international client, Artizone, Inc. based near Tel Aviv, Israel. Artizone.com allows consumers to shop local artisan food stores, place an order and have it home delivered on the same or next day. Artizone is currently operating in Chicago and Dallas with ambitious growth plans in the U.S. and major cities throughout the world.
