= Bottom Dollar =

Bottom Dollar may refer to:

- Bottom Dollar Food, an American soft-discount grocery chain
- Bottom Dollar (album), a 2002 album by Nathan Wiley
