= Mega Image =

Romanian supermarket chain owned by Ahold Delhaize

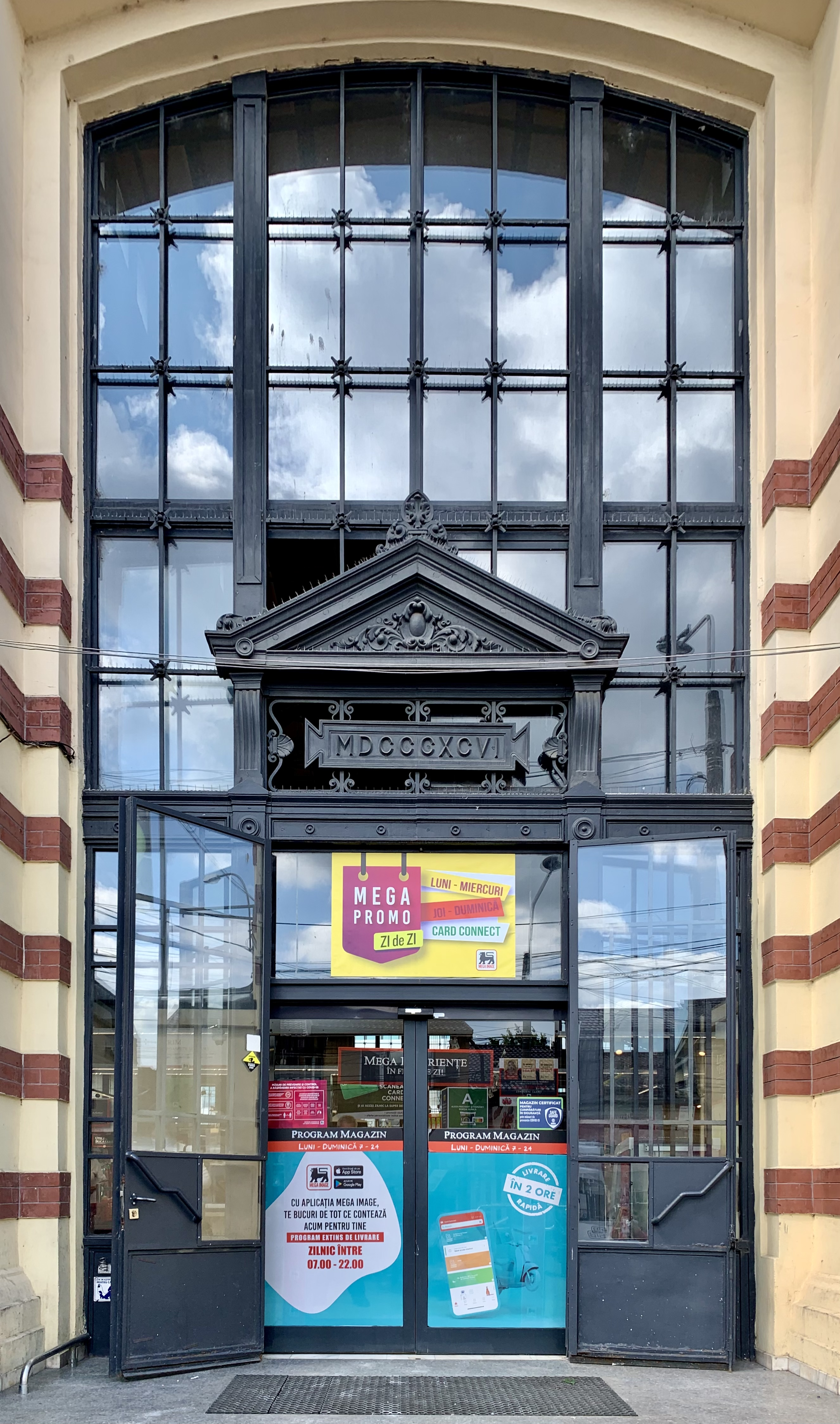
- Entrance of the Traian Hall, currently a Mega Image
- Industry: Supermarkets
- Founded: 1995; 31 years ago
- Headquarters: Bucharest, Romania
- Number of locations: 985 (2025)
- Area served: Romania
- Revenue: 1,229,000,000 (2018)
- Net income: 54,500,000 (2018)
- Number of employees: 9,741 (2018)
- Parent: Ahold Delhaize
- Website: mega-image.ro

Mega Image is a supermarket chain, established in Romania in 1995, owned by Ahold Delhaize. It operates 806 stores in Argeș, Bihor, Brașov, Bucharest, Cluj, Constanța, Dâmbovița, Giurgiu, Iași, Ilfov, Prahova, Sibiu, Timiș, Bacău and Vrancea counties.

== History ==
The chain was established in 1995. In 2000, it was acquired by the Delhaize group that later merged into Ahold Delhaize, and like most Delhaize properties, has a logo of a lion, like the Serbian Maxi, and Food Lion in the Southeastern United States.

== Divestments ==
In August 2025, Ahold Delhaize, the parent company of Mega Image, agreed to divest 87 stores in Romania in order to obtain regulatory approval for its acquisition of Profi Rom Food. The divestment package includes five Mega Image supermarkets and 82 Profi locations. The Romanian retailer Annabella was selected as the buyer, following approval by the Romanian Competition Council. The transaction is expected to be completed by the end of 2025.

== Products ==
Mega Image sells minimally processed foods like vegetables, breads and cheeses, as well as packaged processed foods and candies. Other items for sale include spices, sauces, residential cleaning supplies, and pet foods. Some Mega Image stores with more traffic also sell ready-to-eat foods like salads and pastas.
