= Artizone =

American online food delivery company

- Type: Private
- Industry: Online Grocery
- Founded: 2009; 17 years ago
- Founders: Alex Zeltcer; Lior Lavy; Shmuel Zichel; Sagi Briteman; Yehudit Buchnik
- Defunct: 2016; 10 years ago
- Area served: Dallas; Chicago
- Number of employees: Approx. 60
- Website: www.artizone.com

Artizone is an online food delivery service connecting customers in selected U.S. cities with local artisans through one website.

== History ==
Artizone was founded in 2009 as a spin-off of the local Israeli branch of Dassault Systèmes (DS). At its inception, Artizone focused on maintaining the ENOVIA SmarTeam V5 products owned by DS. In 2010, the company launched its website, creating the Artizone online specialty food shopping community with 22 local artisans in Dallas. In Jan 2012, Artizone expanded to Chicago.

== Locations ==
Artizone.com operated in the Dallas area and in the Chicago area.

- Dallas area:
  - Dallas, Addison, Allen, Carrollton, Coppell, Flower Mound, Frisco, Irving, McKinney, Plano, Richardson.
- Chicago area:
  - DuPage, Lake, Cook.

== Vendors ==
=== Dallas, Texas ===
1888	Big Al's Texas Rubs	Busy B's Market
County Line Farms	Dallas Fine Wines	Dude, Sweet Chocolate
Empire Baking Company	Flavors From Afar	From the Grocer
Gio's NY Deli	Hirsch's Specialty Meats	Holy Ravioli
JJ&B - Jellies Jams & Butters	Kessler Cookie Company	La Duni
Mawker Coffee	Poison Ivy	Rex's Seafood
Scardello	Three Happy Cows	Uptown Popcorn

=== Chicago, Illinois ===
Gepperth's Meat Market	Great American Cheese	Green Grocer Chicago
Hagen's Fish Market	Hendrickx Belgian Breadcrafter	Italian Superior Bakery
Katherine Anne Confections	Pasta Puttana	

== See also ==
- FreshDirect
- Peapod
- AmazonFresh
