= Delhaize Group =

Former Belgian multinational retail company

Delhaize Group SA
- Company type: Société anonyme
- Traded as: Euronext Brussels: DHZ
- Industry: Retail; Wholesaling
- Founded: 1867; 159 years ago
- Defunct: 24 July 2016; 9 years ago
- Fate: Merged with Ahold
- Successor: Ahold Delhaize
- Headquarters: Anderlecht, Brussels, Belgium
- Number of locations: 3,534 in Europe, North America and Asia (2013)
- Key people: Frans Muller (CEO); Mats Jansson (Chairman); Kevin Holt (CEO, Delhaize America)
- Services: Supermarkets, hypermarkets, convenience stores
- Revenue: €21.1 billion (2013)
- Net income: €487 million (2013)
- Total assets: €11.6 billion (end 2013)
- Total equity: €5.076 billion (end 2013)

Delhaize Group SA (French pronunciation: [dəlɛz], Dutch pronunciation: [dəˈleːzə]) was a Belgian multinational retail company headquartered in Molenbeek-Saint-Jean, Brussels, Belgium, and operated in seven countries and on three continents. The principal activity of Delhaize Group was the operation of food supermarkets. On 24 June 2015, Delhaize reached an agreement with Ahold to merge and form a new parent/holding company headquartered in the Netherlands: Ahold Delhaize.

== History ==
Delhaize was founded near Charleroi, Belgium, in 1867 by Jules Delhaize and his brothers Auguste, Edouard and Adolphe. He was helped in this endeavor by his future brother-in-law, Jules Vieujant. For their new shop, they chose the lion, the symbol of strength, as their logo. They also chose a motto: unity is strength.

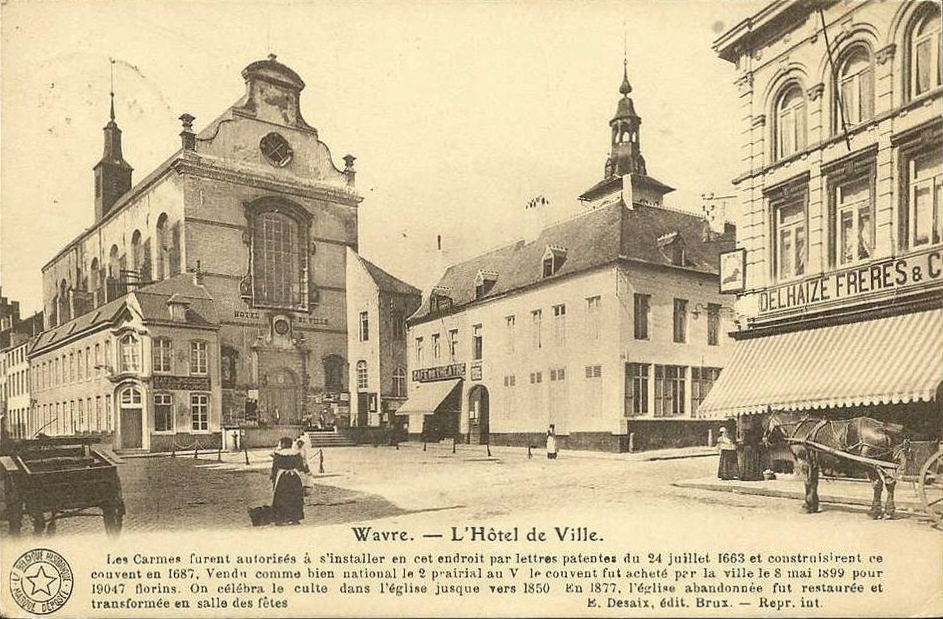
A branch of Delhaize Frères in Wavre, c.1900

In 2005, Delhaize Group completed the acquisition of the Belgian supermarket chain Cash Fresh for 118.6 million euros. Delhaize paid an additional 51 million euros to acquire real estate assets of Cash Fresh.

As of 31 December 2014, Delhaize Group had a sales network (which includes directly operated, franchised, and affiliated stores) of 3,402 stores and employed approximately 150,000 people (excluding the stores and related associates of divested and discontinued operations). Store formats are primarily supermarkets, which represent 85% of Delhaize Group's sales network. Delhaize Group's sales network also includes other store formats such as neighborhood stores, convenience stores, and specialty stores. The company is actively engaged with the U.S. Environmental Protection Agency's Energy Star program to manage energy efficiency across its U.S. facilities.

In addition to food retailing, Delhaize Group engages in food wholesaling to stores in its sales network and in nonfood retailing of products such as pet products and health and beauty products.

In 2014, Delhaize Group recorded revenue of €21.4 billion and underlying operating profit of €762 million. Delhaize Group's operations are located primarily in the United States (Food Lion LLC, Hannaford Brothers Company) and Belgium. Other operations are located in Greece, Indonesia, Serbia, Luxembourg and Romania.

Delhaize entered the U.S. market through its acquisition of Food Town Stores in 1983, renaming it Food Lion due to name conflict with other stores, and expanding from 22 stores to 226. In 1985, it became a franchisee for Cub Foods and opened the first of many stores in the Atlanta area and in 1996, acquired Kash n' Karry, a Florida grocery chain. Both its Cub Foods stores, and the Kash n' Karry chain have since been sold by Delhaize.

In 2007, the company left the Czech market after 16 years and sold all of its 97 supermarkets to Billa. On 19 January 2009 Delhaize announced on request that the branches in Aachen and Cologne should be sold. In 2009, the company left the German market after 6 years and sold all of its 4 supermarkets to REWE Group. In 2011, Delhaize acquired Serbian retailer Delta Maxi.

In May 2013, Harveys was sold along with sister supermarket chains Sweetbay and Reid's to BI-LO, LLC for $265 million.

The locations in Montenegro were sold in 2013. The locations in Bosnia and Herzegovina were sold in 2014.

In November 2014, Delhaize Group signed an agreement to sell its Bottom Dollar food store locations in the U.S. to Aldi, Inc. The stores were closed on 12 January 2015, and the transaction was completed early 2015.

On 24 June 2015, Delhaize reached an agreement with Ahold to merge, forming a new parent company, Ahold Delhaize. The merger agreement was signed after approval by shareholders and competition authorities on 23 July 2016. Ahold CEO Dick Boer became CEO of the merged company until his retirement in July 2018, with Frans Muller, CEO of Delhaize initially as deputy CEO and chief integration officer under supervision of Dick Boer. Frans Muller succeeded as CEO in July 2018.

== Sales divisions ==
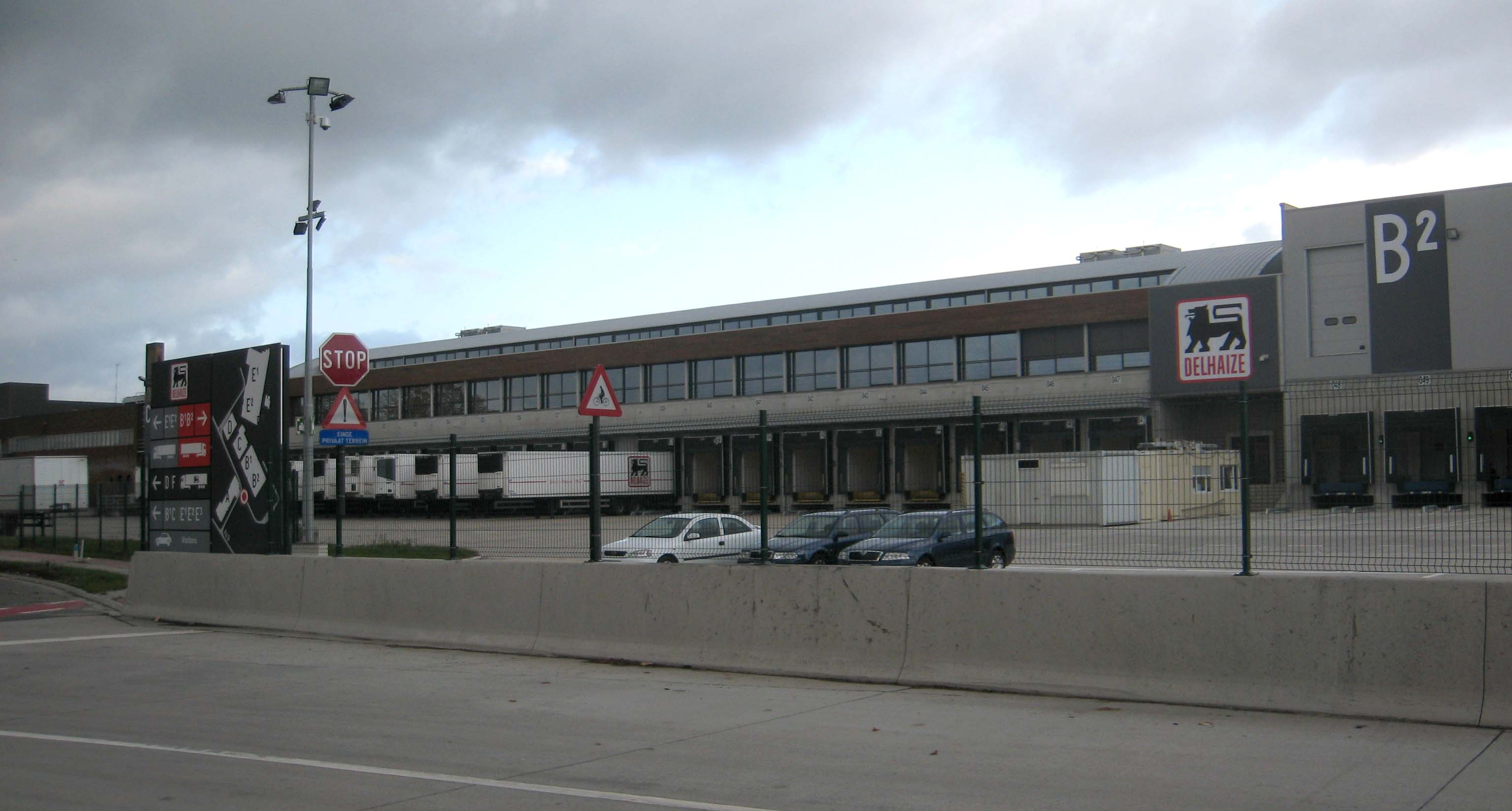
Delhaize distribution centre in Zellik

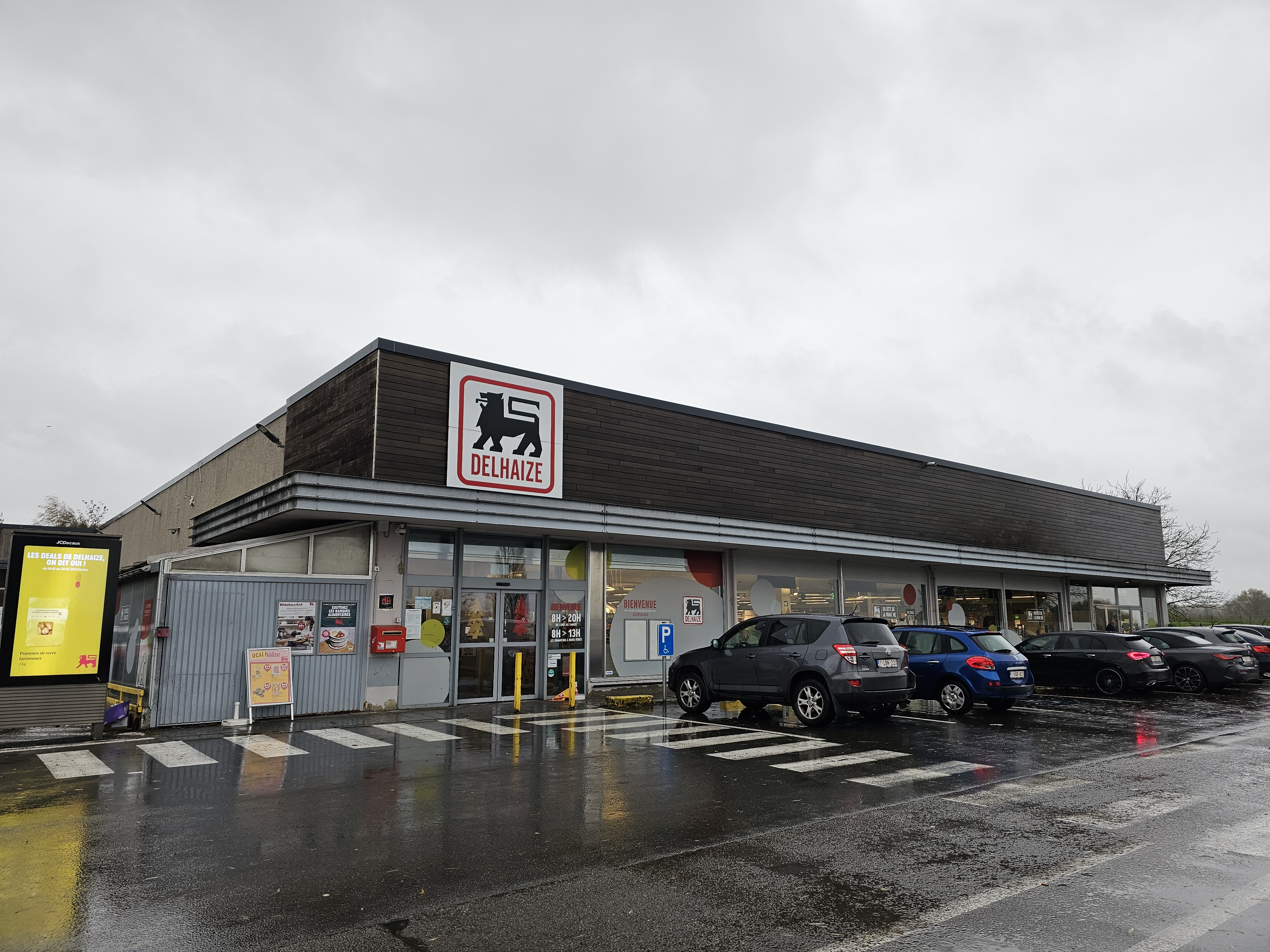
Delhaize supermarket in Épinois, Belgium

=== Europe ===
Belgium

- Delhaize
- AD Delhaize
- Proxy Delhaize
- Shop & Go
- Delhaize.be
- Caddyhome.be
- Delhaizewineworld.com

Czech Republic

- Delvita (1991–2007)

Luxembourg

- Delhaize
- Proxy Delhaize

Greece

- Alfa-Beta Vassilopoulos
- City AB
- AB Shop & Go
- AB Food Market
- ENA

Romania

- Mega Image
- Shop & Go

Slovakia

- Delvita (1991–2005)

Serbia

- Maxi
- Shop & Go (formerly: Mini Maxi)
- Tempo Centar (formerly: Tempo Cash & Carry)
- Mega Maxi

=== North America ===
United States

Operated as Delhaize America, a wholly owned subsidiary of Delhaize Group:

- Bottom Dollar Food
- Food Lion
- Hannaford

=== Asia ===
Indonesia

- Super Indo (51%)

== See also ==
- European Retail Round Table
