= Food Lion, Inc. v. Capital Cities/ABC, Inc. =

1999 Fourth Circuit Court of Appeals case

- Court: United States Court of Appeals for the Fourth Circuit
- Full case name: Food Lion, Inc. v. Capital Cities/ABC, Inc., et al.
- Decided: October 20, 1999

Case history
- Appealed from: United States District Court for the Middle District of North Carolina

Court membership
- Judges sitting: Paul V. Niemeyer; M. Blane Michael; Diana Gribbon Motz

Case opinions
- Majority: Michael, joined by Motz
- Concur/dissent: Niemeyer

Food Lion, Inc. v. Capital Cities/ABC, Inc., 194 F.3d 505 (4th Cir. 1999), was a case in which the United States Court of Appeals for the Fourth Circuit held that two PrimeTime Live journalists had trespassed and breached their duty of loyalty, but had not committed fraud, when they secured jobs at Food Lion under fake identities and secretly took video and audio recordings. The journalists were acting on a tip that Food Lion was engaging in deceptive practices in selling meat, including grinding expired and fresh beef together and bleaching meat to mask its smell.

== Background ==
In early 1992 producers of ABC's news program PrimeTime Live received a tip that Food Lion stores were handling meat in unsanitary ways. The tip said employees mixed expired beef with fresh beef, bleached meat to hide the smell, and put new dates on expired products.

== References and further reading ==
=== Academic sources ===
- Scheim, Charles C. (1998). "Trash tort or trash TV?: Food Lion, Inc. v. ABC, Inc., and tort liability of the media for newsgathering". St. John's Law Review. 72 (1): 185–218.
- Carmody, Cris (1999). "Applying a persona test for newsgathering privilege to Food Lion v. Capital Cities/ABC". Northwestern University Law Review. 93 (4): 1287–1328.
- Levin, Daniel A.; Roline, Alan C. (2001). "Undercover reporters, tort law, and the First Amendment: Food Lion v. ABC and the future of surreptitious newsgathering". Kansas Journal of Law & Public Policy. 11 (3): 575–628.

=== Other sources ===
- Lynch, Timothy (1997). "The Food Lion case: Are journalists above the law?". Cato Institute.
- Pratt, Cornelius B. (1997). "Food Lion Inc. v. ABC News Inc.: Invasive deception for the public interest?". Public Relations Quarterly. 42 (1): 18–20.
