= Frans Muller =

CEO of Dutch retail company Ahold Delhaize

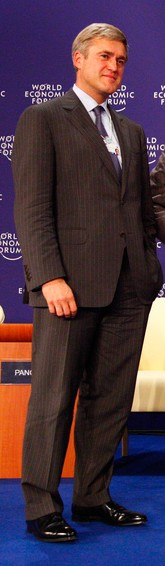
- Born: Frans W. H. Muller; 1960 or 1961 (age 65–66)
- Education: Erasmus University Rotterdam
- Occupation: Businessman
- Title: CEO of Ahold Delhaize
- Term: July 2018-
- Predecessor: Dick Boer

Frans W. H. Muller (born 1961) is a Dutch businessman, and the CEO of Ahold Delhaize, since July 2018, having been deputy CEO.

== Education ==
Muller earned a master's degree in business economics from Erasmus University Rotterdam.

== Career ==
Muller started his career with KLM Cargo, from 1988 to 1997. He worked for Makro Cash & Carry from 1998 to 2002. He worked for Metro AG from 2002 to 2013, rising to become a Member of the Management Board of Metro Group AG and CEO Metro Cash & Carry.

In 2013, Muller joined Delhaize as president and CEO. Muller was CEO of Delhaize until Ahold bought the company for Euro 9.3 billion in 2015, when he became deputy CEO of the combined company.

Muller succeeded Dick Boer when he retired as CEO of Ahold Delhaize on 1 July 2018.
