= Gerrit Jan Heijn =

Dutch businessman (1931–1987)

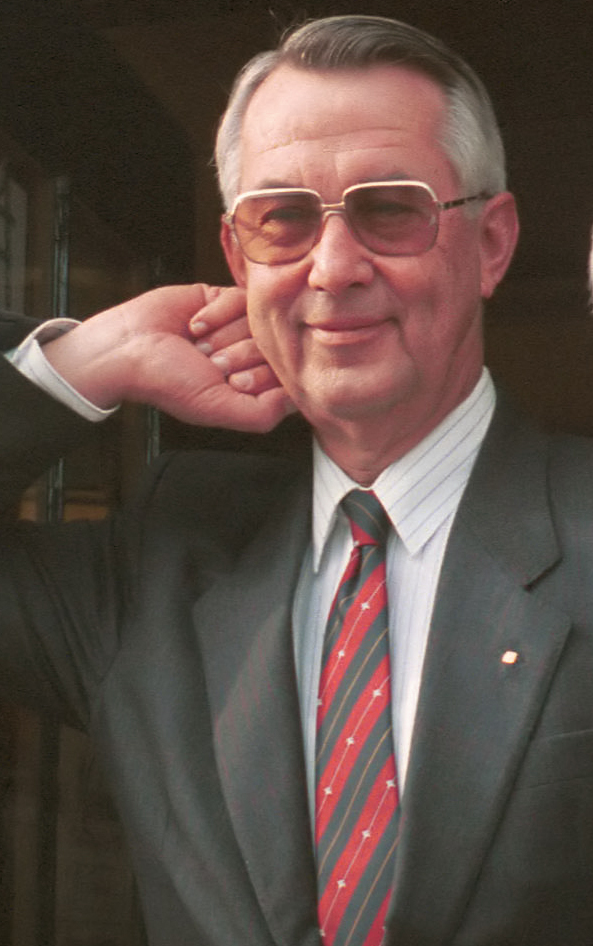
- Born: 14 February 1931; Zaandam, Netherlands
- Died: 9 September 1987 (aged 56); Doorwerth, Netherlands
- Spouse: Hank Engel (m. 1956)
- Children: 4, including Ronald Jan
- Relatives: Albert Heijn Jr. (brother); Albert Heijn Sr. (grandfather)

Gerrit Jan Heijn (14 February 1931, Zaandam – 9 September 1987, Doorwerth) was a Dutch businessman, who was a top manager of Ahold until his murder in 1987. His grandfather was Albert Heijn, who founded the family business, and his older brother was also named Albert Heijn, who was the founder of Ahold. His son, Ronald Jan Heijn, played for the Dutch national field hockey team.

== Death ==
On 9 September 1987, he was kidnapped near his villa in Bloemendaal, Netherlands by Ferdi Elsas (Arnhem, 6 September 1942 — Zutphen, 3 August 2009) from Landsmeer. Although Elsas murdered Heijn within a few hours of his kidnapping, he falsely stated that Heijn was still alive for an extended period of time and demanded for ransom. He sent the Heijn family Gerrit Jan's glasses and severed little finger. Elsas was caught when he started spending banknotes of the ransom he received, of which the numbers had been recorded.

He served a prison sentence and was freed in 2001. Elsas gave directions to Heijn's body, which was buried in the woods near Renkum. Gerrit Jan Heijn was cremated on 9 April 1988 in Driehuis. Elsas was hit by an excavator on 3 August 2009 while riding his bicycle near the town of Vorden, Gelderland and died in a hospital at Zutphen.

The 2004 movie The Clearing is loosely based on Heijn's kidnapping and murder.

== See also ==
- List of kidnappings
- List of solved missing person cases: 1950–1999
