= Hans Schmitz =

German politician

Member of the Bundestag
- In office 7 September 1949 – 7 September 1953

Personal details
- Born: 10 December 1896
- Died: 8 January 1986 (aged 89)
- Party: CDU

Hans Schmitz (December 12, 1896 – January 8, 1986) was a German politician of the Christian Democratic Union (CDU) and former member of the German Bundestag.

== Life ==
In 1949 Schmitz ran for the CDU in the constituency of Rheydt-Mönchengladbach-Viersen, was directly elected with 37.4% of the votes and thus belonged to the first German Bundestag. He was also a member of the Executive Board of the German Trade Association and Honorary President since 1966.

== Literature ==
Herbst, Ludolf; Jahn, Bruno (2002). Vierhaus, Rudolf (ed.). Biographisches Handbuch der Mitglieder des Deutschen Bundestages. 1949–2002 [Biographical Handbook of the Members of the German Bundestag. 1949–2002] (in German). München: De Gruyter - De Gruyter Saur. p. 1715. ISBN 978-3-11-184511-1.
