= German Trade Association =

- Formation: 1949; 77 years ago
- Headquarters: Berlin
- Leader: Alexanders von Preen (President); Stefan Genth (CEO)
- Website: www.einzelhandel.de

The German Trade Association (German: Handelsverband Deutschland, HDE) is the umbrella organisation of the German retail trade in the legal form of a registered association based in Berlin. As an employers' and trade association, it represents the interests of the retail trade in Germany and the European Union.

It speaks for around 400,000 independent companies with almost 3 million employees and an annual turnover of over 420 billion euros. Medium-sized companies characterize the sector, as 98 percent of retail companies employ fewer than 50 people and do not generate more than 10 million euros in turnover annually. The more than 100,000 members also include the few industry giants with high turnover.

== Organisation ==
The association's bodies are the Assembly of Delegates, the Presidium, the executive board and the Collective Bargaining Advisory Board.

=== Executive board ===
In addition to the president, the executive board consists of ten vice presidents.

The presidents since the re-establishment in 1947 were:

- 1947–1966: Hans Schmitz (honorary president since 1966)
- 1966–1969: Joseph Illerhaus
- 1969–1984: Friedrich Gottlieb Conzen (honorary president since 1984)
- 1984–1990: Wolfgang Hinrichs (honorary president since 1990)
- 1990–2006: Hermann Franzen (honorary president since 2006)
- 2006–2022: Josef Sanktjohanser
- since 2022: Alexander von Preen

=== General management ===
- Chief Executive Officers since the re-founding in 1947:
- end of the 1960s: Werner Skusa
- at least since 1989: Karl-Heinz Niehüser
- 1993–2007: Holger Wenzel
- 2007–present: Stefan Genth

== Membership ==
Members of the trade association are 8 trade associations at the state level (state associations) and 29 federal trade associations.

State assiociations

Name	Federal state/s
1. Handelsverband Nord e. V.	Hamburg, Schleswig-Holstein, Mecklenburg-Vorpommern
2. Handelsverband Niedersachsen-Bremen e. V.	Niedersachsen, Bremen
3. Handelsverband Berlin-Brandenburg e. V.	Berlin, Brandenburg
4. Handelsverband Mitteldeutschland e. V.	Sachsen, Sachsen-Anhalt, Thüringen
5. Handelsverband Nordrhein Westfalen e. V.	Nordrhein-Westfalen
6. Handelsverband Mitte - Hessen, Rheinland-Pfalz, Saarland e. V.	Hessen, Rheinland-Pfalz, Saarland
7. Handelsverband Baden-Württemberg e. V.	Baden-Württemberg
8. Handelsverband Bayern e. V.	Bayern

Further:

- Rhineland-Palatinate Trade Association
- Trade Association Southwest for Rhineland-Palatinate and Saarland

Federal trade associations include the Federal Association of German Food Retailers, the Federal Association of German Textile Retailers and the Federal Association of Retail Technology.

The association is a member of the Confederation of German Employers' Associations, the Employers' organisation in the retail sector, and fulfils this role per the Collective Bargaining Act. It exercises its right to have a say in social policy in social self-administration, from the Federal Employment Agency to the German Pension Insurance Fund and the local health insurance funds, as well as representation before labour and social courts. The HDE is also a member of EuroCommerce, the European umbrella organisation for the wholesale and retail trade.

== History ==
The association was founded on 13 March 1919 as the main association of the German retail trade. Oscar Tietz is considered to be one of the initiators of the foundation. From 1925 to 1933, Joachim Tiburtius was a managing board member and the Provisional Reich Economic Council member. In 1932, the large companies 'Verband Deutscher Kauf- und Warenhäuser' and the 'Reichsverband der Filialgeschäfte des Lebensmitteleinzelhandels' were forced out of the main association by radicalised forces of the middle class. From 1933 to 1935, Joachim Tiburtius was chief executive of the HDE. In 1934, the association's activities were stopped by the National Socialists' with the enforced conformity, in which all independent associations were replaced by Reich or economic groups of the Reich Chamber of Commerce. All retail businesses became compulsory members of the newly introduced Retail Trade Economic Group within the Reich Trade Group, and the Main Association of the German Retail Trade was dissolved in 1936.

On 12 September 1947, the Hauptgemeinschaft des Deutschen Einzelhandels was newly founded in Bonn by the state retail associations of Bavaria, Bremen, Hamburg, Hesse, Lower Saxony, North Rhine-Westphalia, Schleswig-Holstein, Westphalia and WürttembergBaden in West Germany. In 1949, the association moved to Frankfurt am Main. In October of the same year, the delegates' meeting decided to change the name to Hauptgemeinschaft des Deutschen Einzelhandels e. V. Three other regional associations joined the main association. Cologne became the headquarters of the main association on 1 June 1950. Until the fall of the Berlin Wall, no trade association activities took place on the territory of the GDR. In 1990, the organisation was renamed the Hauptverband des Deutschen Einzelhandels (HDE).

At the end of 2009, the association was renamed Handelsverband Deutschland - HDE e.V. The name change was intended to reflect the restructuring of the retail organisation in the regions and federal states. At the same time, following the dissolution of the trade association BAG (Bundesarbeitsgemeinschaft der Mittel- und Großbetriebe des Einzelhandels e. V.) on 9 December 2009, its large member companies were to be offered a new professional interest group at federal level. The Federal Association of Chain Stores and Self-Service Department Stores (BFS) was merged into the HDE on 1 July 2002 as an interest group representing well-known chain shops and discounters in the food retail sector.

Since 2017, the association has also been one of the founders of the Stiftung Zentrale Stelle Verpackungsregister (ZSVR) in accordance with Section 24 of the German Packaging Act, based in Osnabrück.

=== Name ===
- 1919: Main association of the German retail trade
- 1990: Main Association of the German Retail Trade
- 2009: German Trade Association - HDE

== Awards ==
The association presents the German Trade Award every year. The Retail Innovation Award, which honours innovative approaches in retail, has also been presented at the German Retail Congress since 2015.

Since 2005, the HDE has awarded the title Store of the Year to the most interesting and innovative retail shops of the year. The categories Fashion, Food, Living, Out-of-Line and Special Prize are honoured. The award ceremony takes place as part of the German Retail Property Congress.

=== Former prizes ===
From 2004 to 2011, the HDE and the Handelsjournal, honoured innovative retailers with the Retail Innovation Award.

Until 2011, the HDE acted as the conceptual sponsor of the Retailer of the Year consumer award. When doubts were raised about the methodology of the Dutch market research institute Q& A, which was commissioned to conduct the consumer survey, the association distanced itself from the award.
