= Bottom Dollar Food =

Defunct American soft-discount grocery chain

- Type: Subsidiary
- Industry: Retail
- Founded: September 21, 2005; 20 years ago
- Founder: Created by parent Delhaize America
- Defunct: January 12, 2015
- Fate: Sold to Aldi
- Headquarters: Salisbury, North Carolina, U.S.
- Products: Grocery
- Parent: Delhaize Group

Bottom Dollar Food is a defunct American soft-discount grocery chain. It was a subsidiary of Delhaize America, the U.S. division of international food retailer Delhaize Group. Its headquarters was in Salisbury, North Carolina.

Bottom Dollar Food sold an assortment of both private brands and national brands at low prices. To curtail costs, the grocer offered customers the option to buy bags to sack their groceries, and also used alternative display and stocking techniques, such as cut cases on shelves.

== History ==
Bottom Dollar was created by parent Delhaize America at the same time as the upscale chain Bloom in 2004. The first Bottom Dollar Food opened in High Point, North Carolina, on September 21, 2005, and eventually there were around 30 stores in North Carolina, Virginia, Maryland, and Ohio before the expansion into other states in 2010.

Beginning in October 2010 in King of Prussia, PA, Bottom Dollar Food opened 19 stores in the Delaware Valley and Lehigh Valley areas. The first store in Philadelphia was opened on April 15, 2011. Some industry analysts believed those markets were already overstored with discount competitors such as Aldi, PriceRite and Save-A-Lot. A Philadelphia area competitor was quoted as saying

“It’s always challenging to be the last guy to get in the game, but unlike the other limited assortment discounters already in the market, Bottom Dollar really didn’t present itself as a deep discounter. I believe its mix of private label products with significant branded offerings sent a confusing message to shoppers. Were they trying to become a price-driven operator with decent but not great retails, or a small supermarket with good prices? Their message never seemed to connect.”

In January 2012, Delhaize announced that it would close six and convert 22 others of the original southern Bottom Dollar stores to Food Lion supermarkets as part of a restructuring; the Bloom brand was also retired. The restructuring resulted in the Bottom Dollar name disappearing outside of Pennsylvania and New Jersey.

In late February 2012, Bottom Dollar expanded into Pittsburgh and Youngstown, Ohio, neither of which have the parent Food Lion chain and are dominated by Giant Eagle. In these markets, Bottom Dollar also competed with various SuperValu-supplied stores (including low-price Save-A-Lot), Aldi, and Walmart.

In spring 2013, in order to cut costs, Bottom Dollar started to require a quarter to use a shopping cart. When the quarter was inserted, the cart would be unlocked from the other carts. When the cart was returned, the customer was refunded their coin, effectively costing the customer only the time to return the cart. This was a practice also used by Aldi. Though ubiquitous in Europe, where both Aldi and Bottom Dollar's parent company Delhaize Group are headquartered, it is rare in American stores which often have employees return carts left in parking areas.

In August 2014, it was learned that Delhaize wanted to sell all 66 of its remaining Bottom Dollar stores Forty-six of the stores were located in the Delaware Valley and Lehigh Valley in southern New Jersey and Pennsylvania, and 20 in the Pittsburgh-Youngstown corridor of Pennsylvania and Northeast Ohio. Bottom Dollar stores were reported to range in size from 16,848 square feet (Ambler, PA) to 30,352 square feet (Catasaqua Road, Allentown, PA), an average store being about 20,000 square feet, with weekly sales volumes from $296,800 (North Broad Street, Philadelphia, PA) to $103,000 (East Windsor, NJ), the average sales being around $150,000 weekly. Although 10 of the New Jersey and eastern Pennsylvania stores were company-owned, most stores were leased, with leasehold rents are in the $10–12 per square foot range.

On November 5, 2014, Delhaize Group announced they were selling the Bottom Dollar chain to Aldi, with plans to close the stores by early 2015. The stores were scheduled to close on January 15, 2015, but closed three days early on January 12 due to all the stores selling out their inventory quicker than expected. Delhaize finalized the sale of the shuttered locations to Aldi on March 27, 2015, with plans to reopen 30 of the locations purchased as Aldi, including a location in Pittsburgh's Garfield neighborhood. The remaining locations—all of which were near existing Aldi locations—were either flipped or sublet by Aldi.

== Store brands and competitors ==
The stores sold the My Essentials and Hannaford private brands.

Bottom Dollar Food competed with other discount supermarket chains - including PriceRite, Save-A-Lot, Aldi, and C-Town Supermarkets.
