= Etos =

Retail company of the Netherlands

- Industry: Retail
- Founded: 1919
- Headquarters: Amsterdam, Netherlands
- Area served: Netherlands
- Products: Pharmacies, Drugstores
- Parent: Ahold Delhaize
- Website: www.etos.nl

Etos B.V., trading as Etos, was founded in 1919 by Philips to create a grocery and drugstore where Philips employees could benefit from lower priced products than the average stores. "Etos" is an abbreviation for the Dutch words: Eendracht, Toewijding, Overleg and Samenwerking (Unity, Devotion, Consultation and Cooperation). Since July 1, 2021, the Sebastiaan de Jong has served as brand president.

== History ==
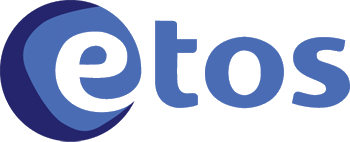
Previous logo

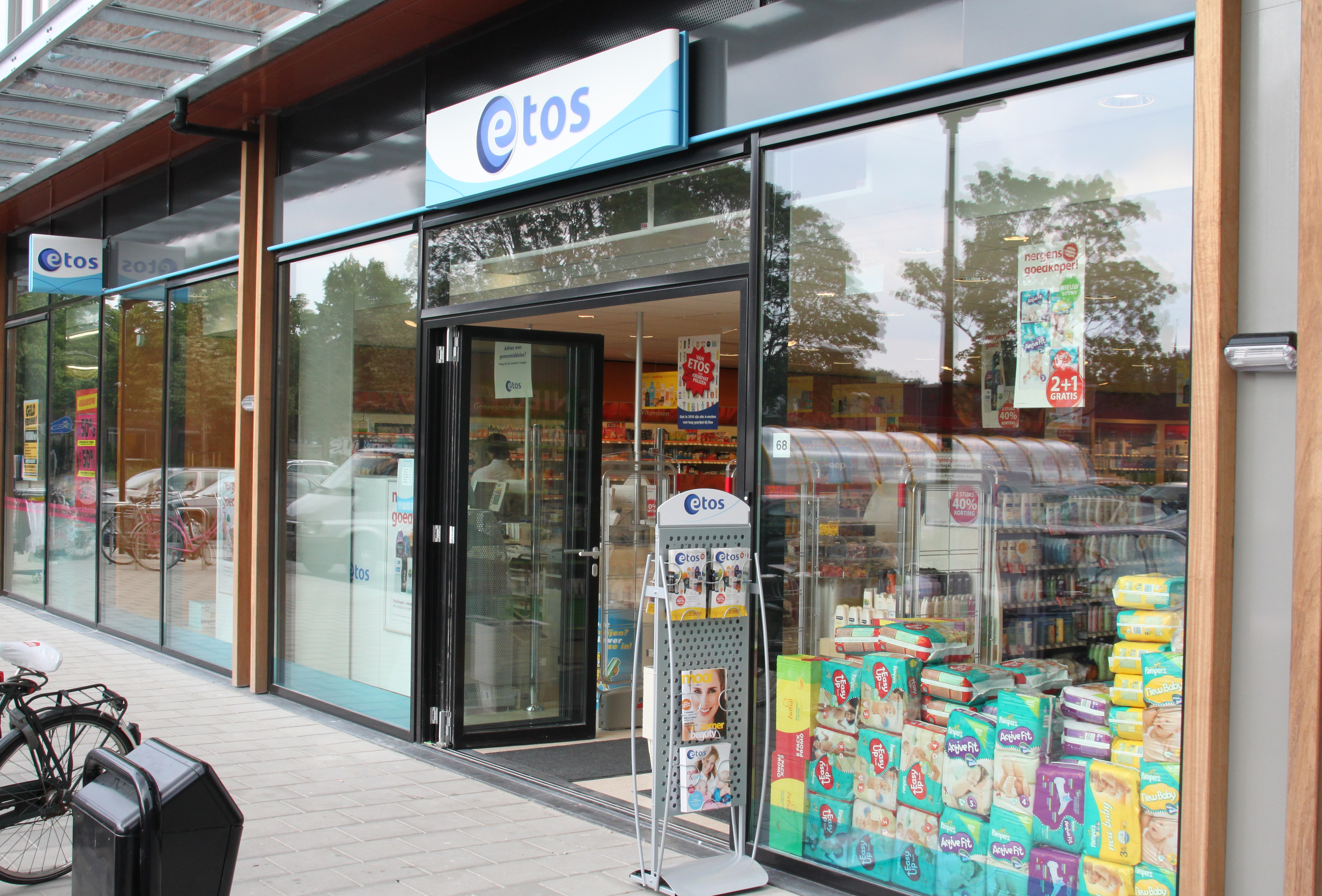
Etos shop in Utrecht

Etos had a bakery and fuel pumps. In 1931 the stores went private as Etos.

In 1973 Etos was bought by Ahold which reformed the grocery stores to the Albert Heijn formula. The drug stores went on as Etos.

Etos has 546 stores in the Netherlands. 54% of the Etos stores operate as franchises.

In 2008 Etos was named best drug store of the Netherlands for the first time (the first 11 years this had been drug store "DA"). In 2009, 2011, 2014, 2015 and 2017 it managed to extend this title.
