= Bol.com =

Dutch multinational e-commerce company owned by Ahold Delhaize

Bol
- Industry: E-commerce
- Founded: 1999; 27 years ago
- Headquarters: Utrecht, Netherlands
- Areas served: Belgium; Netherlands
- Key people: Margaret Versteden (CEO)
- Revenue: ▲€4.3 billion (2020)
- Parent: Ahold Delhaize
- Website: www.bol.com

Bol (formerly bol.com) is a Dutch online retailer and e-commerce marketplace operating in the Netherlands and Belgium. It sells general merchandise across categories including music, film, electronics, toys, jewelry, watches, baby products, gardening, and DIY. In 2011, the company opened its website to third-party sellers as an online marketplace, which has since been used by more than 30,000 merchants. As of 2020, Bol had 11 million active customers, listed over 23 million items, and employed approximately 3,000 people.

== History ==
Bertelsmann executive Thomas Middelhoff proposed an international partnership to Amazon founder Jeff Bezos in late 1997, and after Bezos declined, Bertelsmann decided to build its own online bookstore to compete with Amazon. Daniel Ropers, then a 26-year-old junior consultant at McKinsey & Company, helped write the initial business plan for the venture in 1998, and became CEO in 2000, a position in which he remained until October 2017. The business launched in March 1999 as BOL, short for Bertelsmann On-Line, and went on to open regional storefronts in Germany, the United Kingdom, the Netherlands, Sweden, Italy, and China. In markets such as the United Kingdom, Bertelsmann backed the launch with a large marketing budget and television advertising to challenge Amazon's lead.

After the dot-com bubble burst and its internet division posted heavy losses, Bertelsmann decided in 2002 to exit e-commerce. It put the BOL network up for sale and held talks with Amazon over a possible takeover. The Dutch store had performed better than expected, in part because customers could pay by invoice after delivery using an acceptgiro, a pre-printed Dutch paper bank transfer form. While the other international branches were closed or sold off, the Dutch business continued operating independently. In 2003, it was sold to Weltbild, Holtzbrinck Networks and T-Online Venture Funds. From 2009 to 2012, the company was owned by Cyrte Investments, an investment arm of Delta Lloyd, while Ropers and his executive team continued running daily operations. On 9 May 2012 the Dutch Koninklijke Ahold N.V. acquired Bol.com.
