= Food Lion =

American regional supermarket chain owned by Ahold Delhaize

Food Lion LLC
- Logo since 2000
- Formerly: Food Town (1957–1983)
- Type: Subsidiary
- Industry: Retail
- Founded: December 12, 1957 (68 years ago)
- Founder: Wilson Smith, Ralph Ketner, and Brown Ketner
- Headquarters: Salisbury, North Carolina, United States; 35.682678°N 80.511744°W
- Number of locations: 1,055
- Area served: Mid Atlantic, South Atlantic
- Key people: Greg Finchum, President; Grant Thomas, Sr. Vice President; Tom Robinson, Sr. Vice President
- Products: Grocery, Produce, Meat, Seafood, Dairy, Deli, Bakery, Health and Beauty, Pharmacy, Drive-Thru Grocery Pickup, Beer, Wine
- Number of employees: 82,000+
- Parent: Ahold Delhaize
- Website: www.foodlion.com

Food Lion is an American regional supermarket chain headquartered in Salisbury, North Carolina, that operates over 1,000 supermarkets in 10 states: Delaware, Georgia, Kentucky, Maryland, North Carolina, South Carolina, Pennsylvania, Tennessee, Virginia, and West Virginia. The chain employs over 82,000 people. It was founded in 1957 as Food Town, a single grocery store in Salisbury. It later expanded to many locations across North Carolina. It was independently operated until it was acquired by the Belgian conglomerate Delhaize Group in 1974. In 1983, the company changed its name and branding to Food Lion to allow it to expand into regions where Food Town was already in use by unrelated stores. Food Lion has been owned by Ahold Delhaize since 2016, following several mergers and acquisitions. The mascot has been Leo the Food Lion since January 17, 1997.

== History ==
Food Lion was founded in 1957 in Salisbury, North Carolina, as Food Town by Wilson Smith, Ralph Ketner, and Brown Ketner. The Food Town chain was acquired by the Belgian Delhaize Group grocery company in 1974. Due to Ralph Ketner's savvy business sense and ever-growing grocery store endeavors, initial investors of Ketner's 'Food-Town' virtually all became millionaires. At one point, after a large addition to his quickly growing chain of stores, Rowan County, North Carolina was shown 'per capita' to contain 'the highest number of millionaires' in the United States (all attributed to those initial and early investments). His implementation of weekly (sales) flyers advertising the noticeably low-prices (as compared to other stores), in combination with literally 'plastering' nearly every square inch of each storefront with neon colored hand-lettered signage proved extremely effective. In the store, every item in the weekly sales was 'again' broadcast by custom, hand-lettered cardstock signage. The low-prices were very 'real'. While the profit per item was minimal, the number of products, meats, fresh fruits and vegetables more than made-up for the minimal profit-per-item on sales items. Ketner continually took advantage of suppliers’ small price fluctuations and continually made volume deals. Furthermore, the convenience of offering non-grocery & OTC items not usually found in grocery stores, allowed the corporation to make a healthy profit on those offerings.

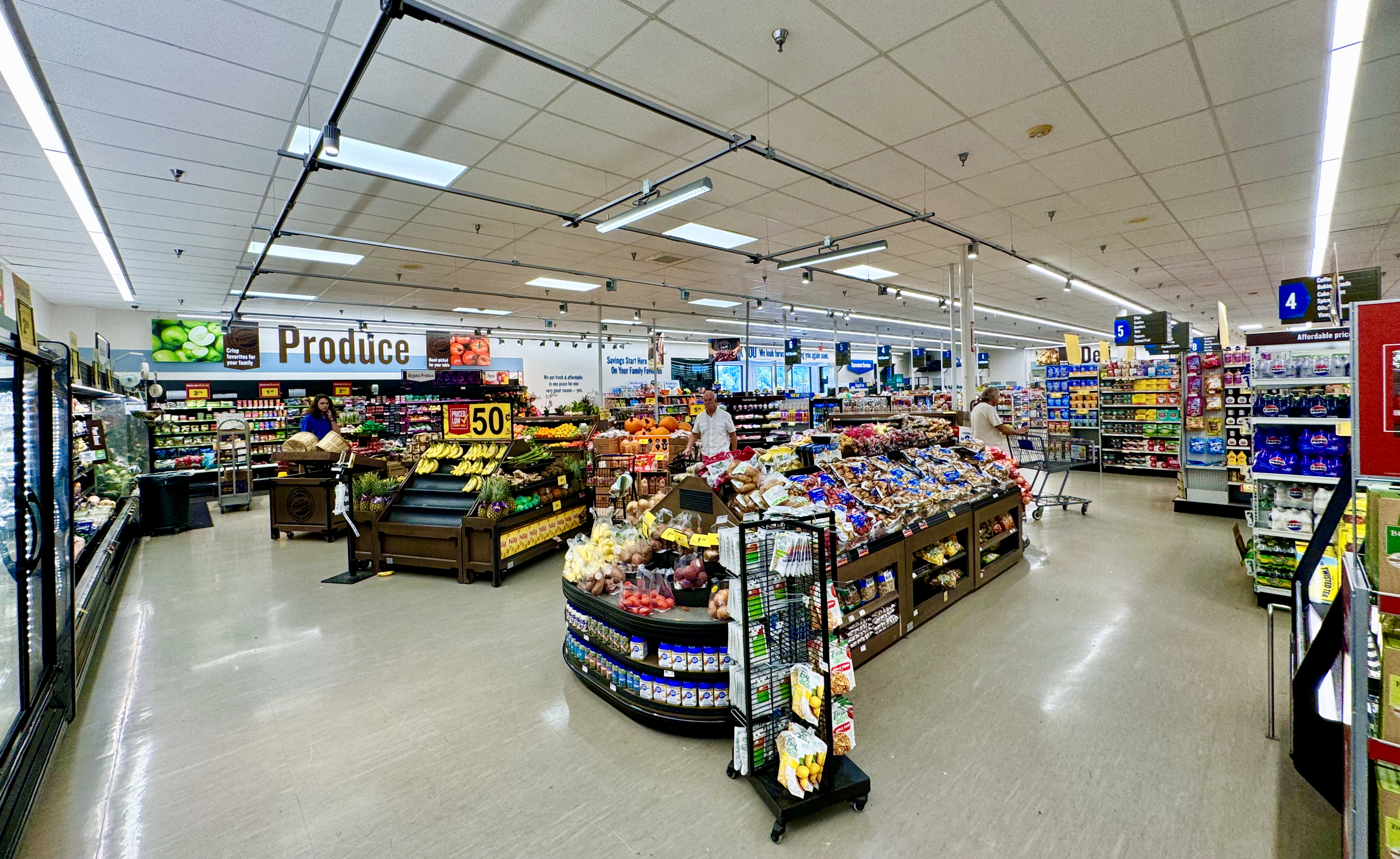
Produce section of a Food Lion

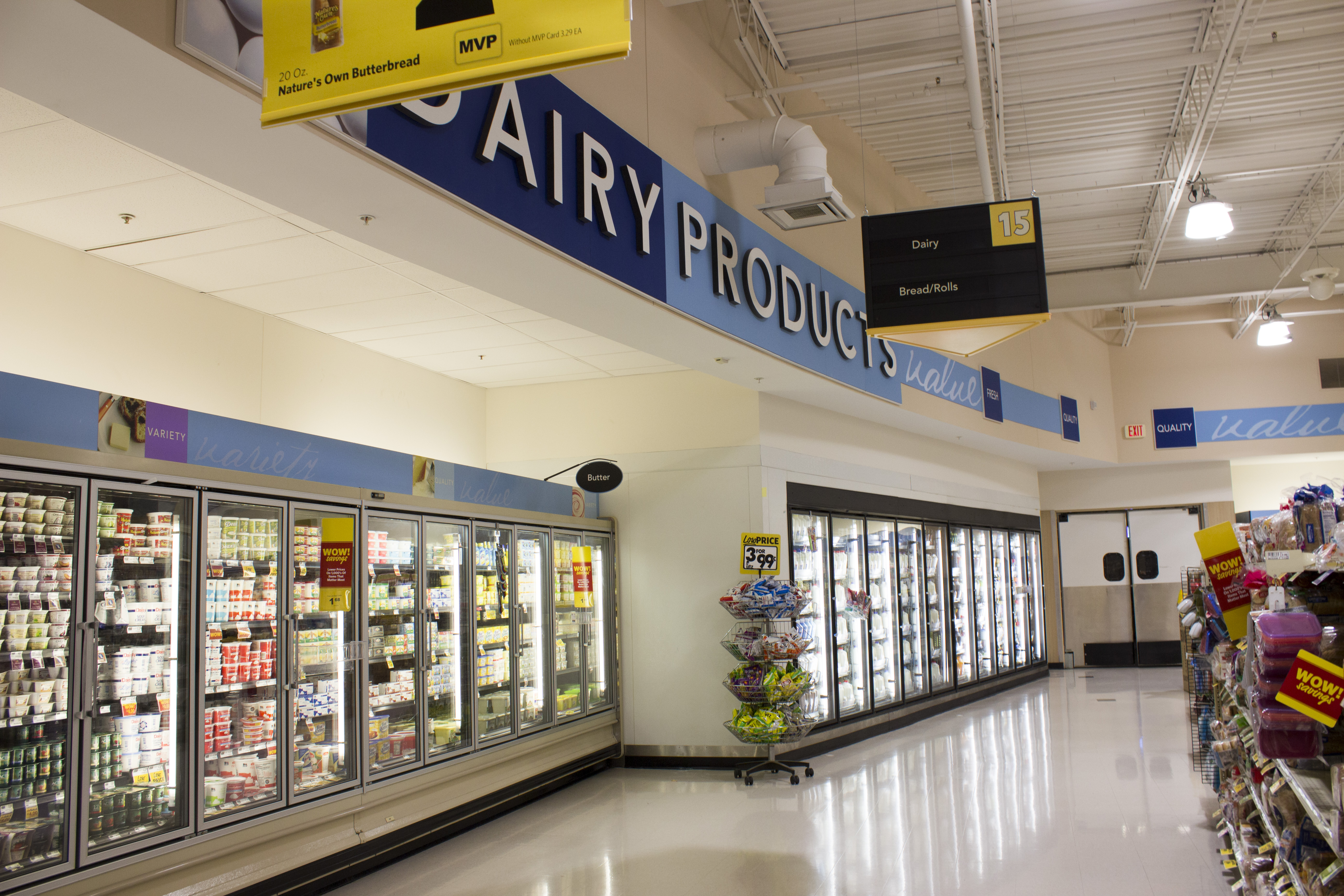
Dairy section of a Food Lion in Hampton, Virginia

The Food Lion name was adopted in 1983; as 'Food Town' expanded into Virginia, the chain encountered several stores called Foodtown in the Richmond area. Expansion into Maryland would have been a bigger problem since about 100 independent, but affiliated, stores were called Food Town. Because Delhaize had a lion in its logo, Food Town asked to use it on product labels and new store signs. Ralph Ketner realized "lion" needed only two new letters and the movement of another in the chain's signs. On December 12, 1982, Ketner announced the name change to "Food Lion," and by the end of March 1983, all stores had been rebranded. The name change, while puzzling for American customers, made economic and historic sense, as Delhaize was once known as Delhaize Le Lion.

Throughout the 1980s, Food Lion expanded throughout the Mid-Atlantic and Southeastern United States. The company continued its expansion throughout the late 1980s, opening hundreds of stores in existing markets, such as the Carolinas and the Virginias, and entering new markets, such as Georgia and Maryland.

In the early 1990s, Food Lion stores appeared in new markets, such as Delaware and southern Pennsylvania; Orlando, Florida; Oklahoma City and Tulsa, Oklahoma; Shreveport, Louisiana; Dallas/Fort Worth; and Houston, Texas. (Of these eight markets Food Lion penetrated in the 1990s, the only ones that still have stores are Delaware and parts of southern Pennsylvania, such as Hanover.) During this time, the chain was the fastest-growing supermarket company in the U.S., as they opened over 100 new stores each year. In November 1992, a critical PrimeTime Live report that showed unsanitary handling of meat and seafood hurt the chain as they attempted to enter new markets in the Northeast and Southwest. (See #Primetime Live controversy)

According to some industry sources, the new stores in Texas, Louisiana, and Oklahoma were already operating below sales projections. The small, lackluster Food Lion stores were beginning to compete with national retail leaders, such as Albertsons, Kroger, Tom Thumb, and Jewel-Osco, all of which were already well-respected in the Southwest and which operated larger stores with more features, but the effects of the devastating ABC report could not be denied, and sales and revenue plummeted. In the Dallas/Fort Worth Metroplex, widespread reports were given of stores sending half of their staff home early due to lack of business and of other stores with "virtually zero meat sales". In the fiscal quarter that included the Thanksgiving holiday of 1992, Delhaize America reported company-wide same-store sales declines of 9.5%. As a result, Food Lion was forced to greatly scale back its expansion plans in Texas and Oklahoma, as well as delay, then cancel its planned entry into new markets in Missouri, Kansas, and Illinois.

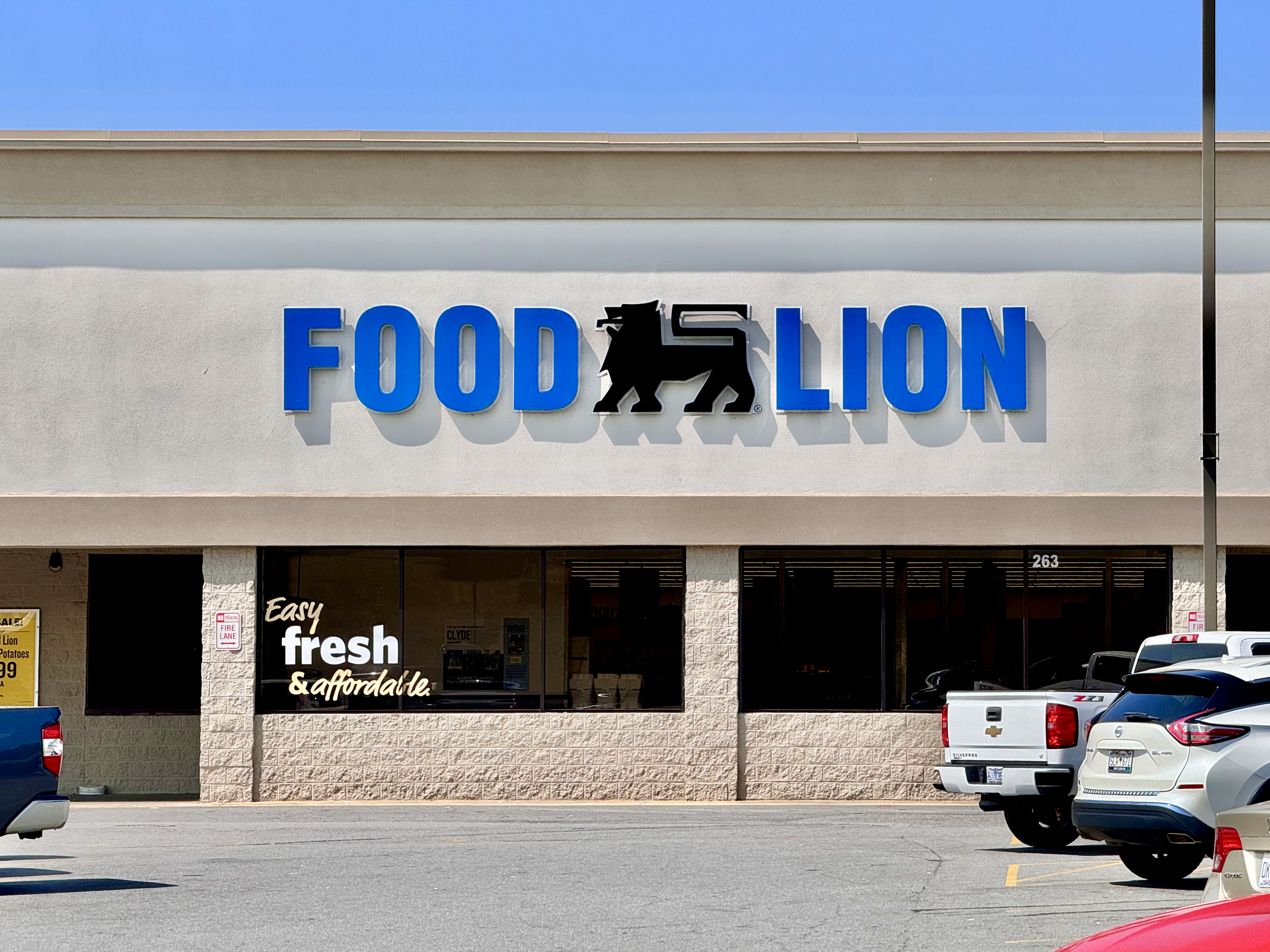
Food Lion in Clyde, North Carolina

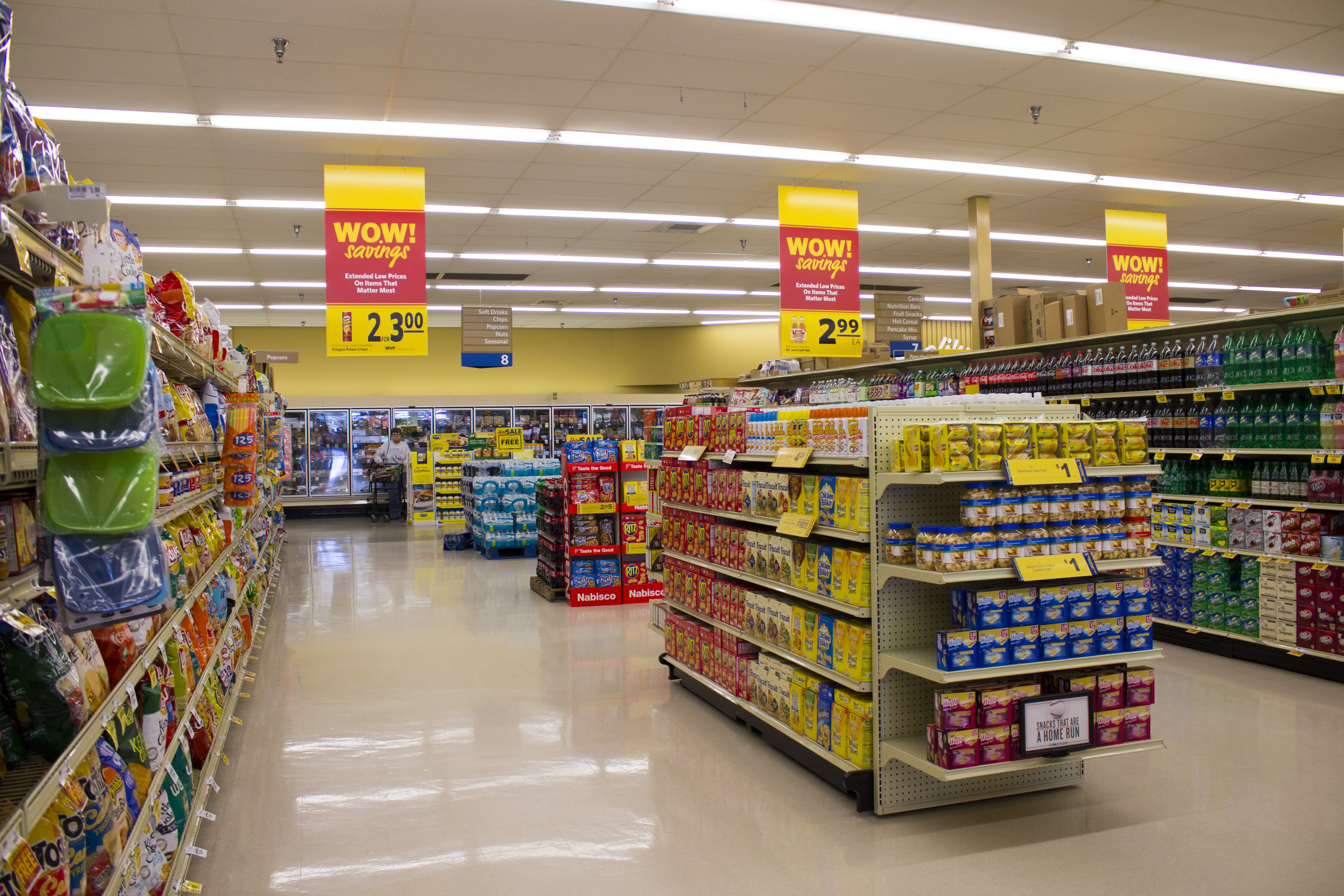
Interior of a store in Southern Shores, North Carolina. The interior has since been updated to the Ahold Delhaize look in mid-2018.

In 1993, Food Lion agreed to pay $16.2 million to settle claims that they violated federal laws regulating unpaid overtime, minimum wage, and child labor, according to the U.S. Department of Labor. In the agreement, which at the time was the largest settlement ever from a private employer accused of violating the Fair Labor Standards Act (FLSA), the grocery chain agreed to ensure that all employees would be well-informed about their rights. Additionally, the Labor Department said Food Lion top management provided assurances that no retaliatory action would be taken against employees who filed complaints about unpaid overtime or other potential FLSA violations. On January 7, 1994, Delhaize announced the first major round of store closings in what would become a yearly event. The stores to be closed included 47 of its brand-new stores in Texas and Oklahoma, as well as stores in Florida, Georgia, North Carolina, Pennsylvania, South Carolina, and Virginia.

Throughout the mid-1990s, the company canceled leases for new stores and closed scores of its newly built outlets in recently established markets, such as Dallas/Fort Worth, Houston, and Oklahoma City. Citing double-digit same-store sales declines for the quarter ending in September 1997, Delhaize announced that it was canceling its Midwest expansion, exiting all markets in Texas, Oklahoma, and Louisiana, and closing its 6-year-old distribution center in Roanoke, Texas. Struggling, Food Lion was forced to recede back to the East Coast, where it faced increasing competition from competitors with larger stores, better customer service, and more variety and amenities; these included regional winners, such as Ingles, Harris Teeter, and Publix; newcomers, such as specialty retailer Whole Foods Market; and expanding national chains, such as Kroger, Target, and Wal-Mart.

Beginning in 2003, Food Lion became active in "market renewals" in which every year Food Lion picks certain cities in their operating area where they remodel stores and update the product offerings. That same year, Food Lion remodeled 68 stores in the Raleigh-Durham, North Carolina, market, followed by 65 stores in the Charlotte area in 2004. In 2006, Food Lion advanced their market renewals program by using demographic and geographic data to figure out whether certain stores should be branded as Food Lion, Bloom, or Bottom Dollar. If the data supported that an already existing Food Lion was adequate for a certain community, the location would simply be remodeled. Should the data support otherwise, the Food Lion store would be remodeled and rebranded as either Bloom or Bottom Dollar. In early 2012, Food Lion closed 113 stores. These were in Georgia, North and South Carolina, Kentucky, and Tennessee, as well as all the stores in Florida.

=== New concept, mergers and acquisitions ===
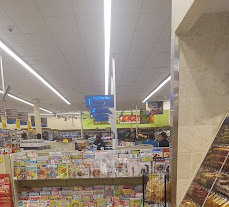
Food Lion in with the "Whitney" decor

In late 2013, Food Lion introduced a new concept and decor at a store in Concord, North Carolina. The first official remodel began in late 2014 to 76 of their stores in the greater Wilmington and Greenville, North Carolina, markets. In March 2015, plans were announced for remodeling of its 162 locations in the Raleigh, North Carolina, market. The Raleigh market remodels were expected to be completed in stores on a rolling basis between April and October 2015. In June 2015, it was announced that Food Lion's parent company, the Delhaize Group, and Ahold would merge into Ahold Delhaize. This merger was completed in July 2016. In March 2016, the company announced that they would make a $215 million investment in its greater Charlotte-area stores and western NC stores. This included remodeling 142 stores, additional price investments, and investments in associates and the community through its Food Lion Feeds initiatives. In July 2016, as part of the corporate merger between Delhaize and Ahold, Food Lion was required to divest 61 locations to a variety of competitors, including Supervalu and Weis Markets in Delaware, Pennsylvania, Maryland, West Virginia, and Virginia to satisfy the Federal Trade Commission's review of the two parent companies' merger. Later that year, Food Lion began remodeling 93 of their stores in the Piedmont Triad region. Remodeling in the Piedmont Triad was completed in the summer of 2017. Richmond, Virginia, stores began getting the concepts implemented in 2017. On March 14, 2018, Supervalu announced that Food Lion was purchasing three Farm Fresh locations in Elizabeth City, North Carolina, and Hampton and Virginia Beach, Virginia, as part of a larger deal to close down the Farm Fresh brand. On April 27, 2018, Food Lion announced plans to acquire four BI-LO locations in Florence, Myrtle Beach, Surfside Beach, and Columbia, South Carolina. Furthermore, on June 3, 2020, Food Lion announced the purchase of 62 Southeastern Grocers stores in North Carolina, South Carolina, and Georgia. These stores were rebranded to Food Lion between February and May 2021.

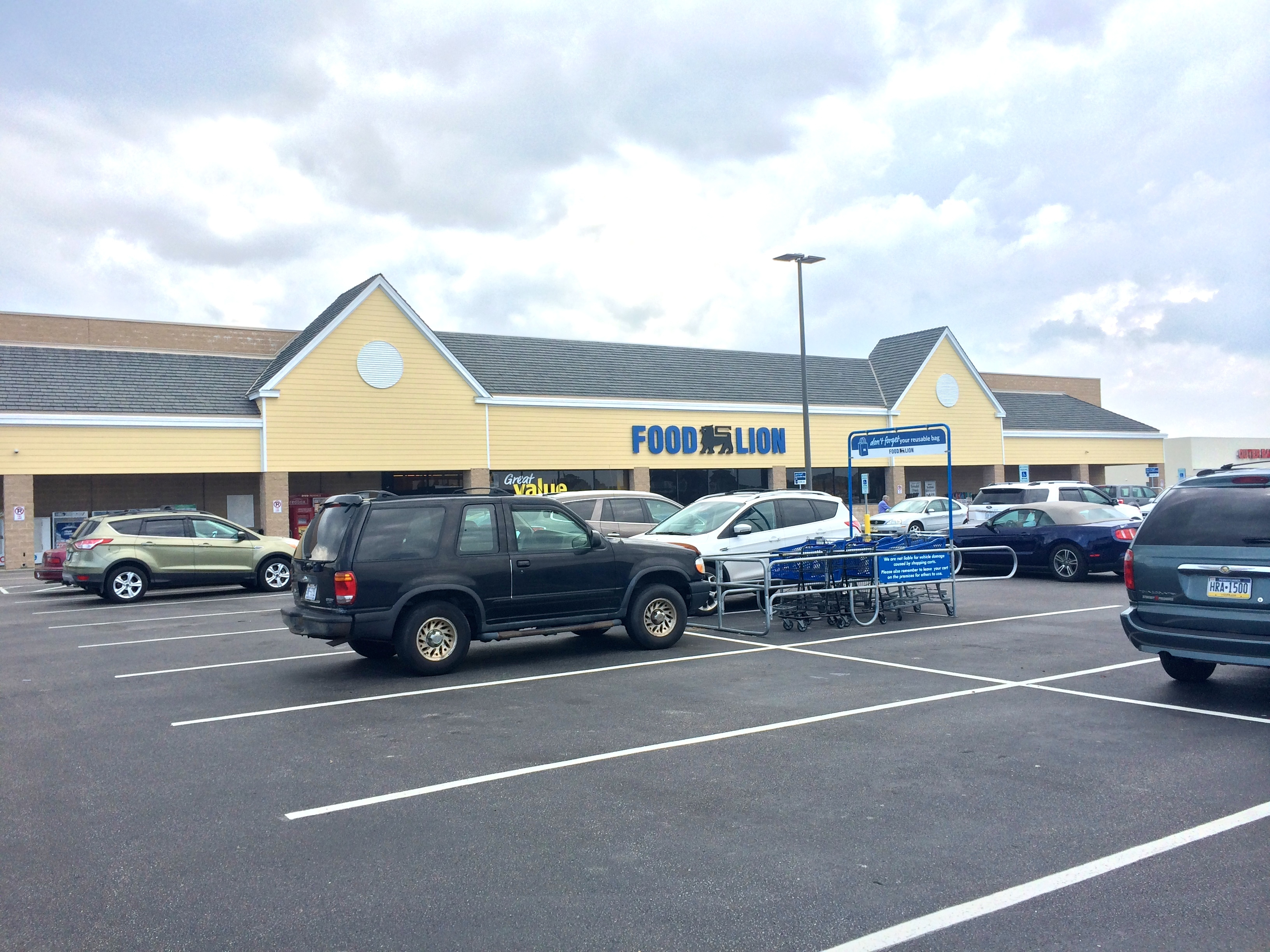
Food Lion featuring new signage in Nags Head, North Carolina

By 2015, Food Lion stores could be found in Delaware, Georgia, Kentucky, Maryland, North Carolina, Pennsylvania, South Carolina, Tennessee, Virginia, and West Virginia.

Food Lion's sister chains include Giant-Carlisle, Giant-Landover, Hannaford Brothers, Martin's Food Markets and Stop & Shop.

=== International stores ===
Food Lion spent seven years attempting to establish a presence in Bangkok, Thailand, starting in 1997. Operated locally by Bel-Thai Supermarket Co, in 2004 it withdrew from the country, selling all branches to Tops Supermarkets.

=== Environmental initiatives ===
For 20 consecutive years, Food Lion has been named Energy Star Partner of the Year and has received the Sustained Excellence Award for 18 consecutive years for its sustainability efforts. In partnership with parent company Ahold Delhaize USA, Food Lion aims to commit to heightened sustainability efforts, which include greater food transparency by 2025; reducing food waste by 50% by 2030 via composting, recycling and animal feed; and a 50% reduction in carbon emissions from its operations and 15% reduction for its supply chains by 2030. Since 2000, Food Lion and Feeding America have partnered to reduce food waste by donating more than 300 million meals to Food Lion's communities through their food rescue initiative. Retailers nationwide implement the food program within their local communities.

=== Promotions and deals ===
Every Wednesday Food Lion renews its deals and promotions in a weekly ad.

=== Brand partnerships ===
On October 6, 2021, Food Lion announced the release of Mountain Dew Uproar, a berry-kiwi flavored version of the drink, as a limited-time collaboration with PepsiCo. The product was created with the Leo the Food Lion mascot in mind, and was available exclusively at Food Lion Stores. Uproar was discontinued in July 2023.

== Former banners ==
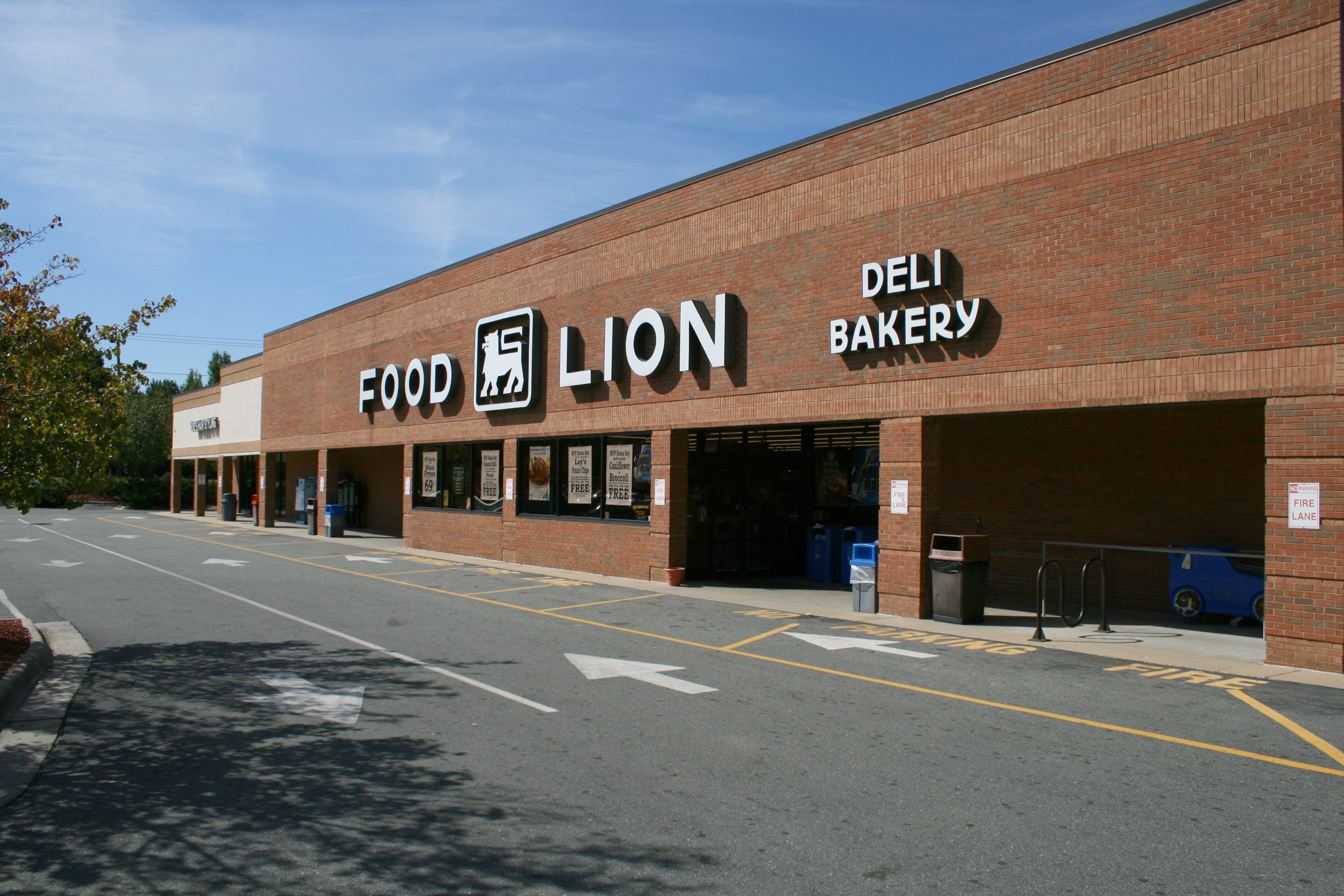
Food Lion in Durham, North Carolina. The store has since remodeled to the new signage in 2015.

=== Bloom ===
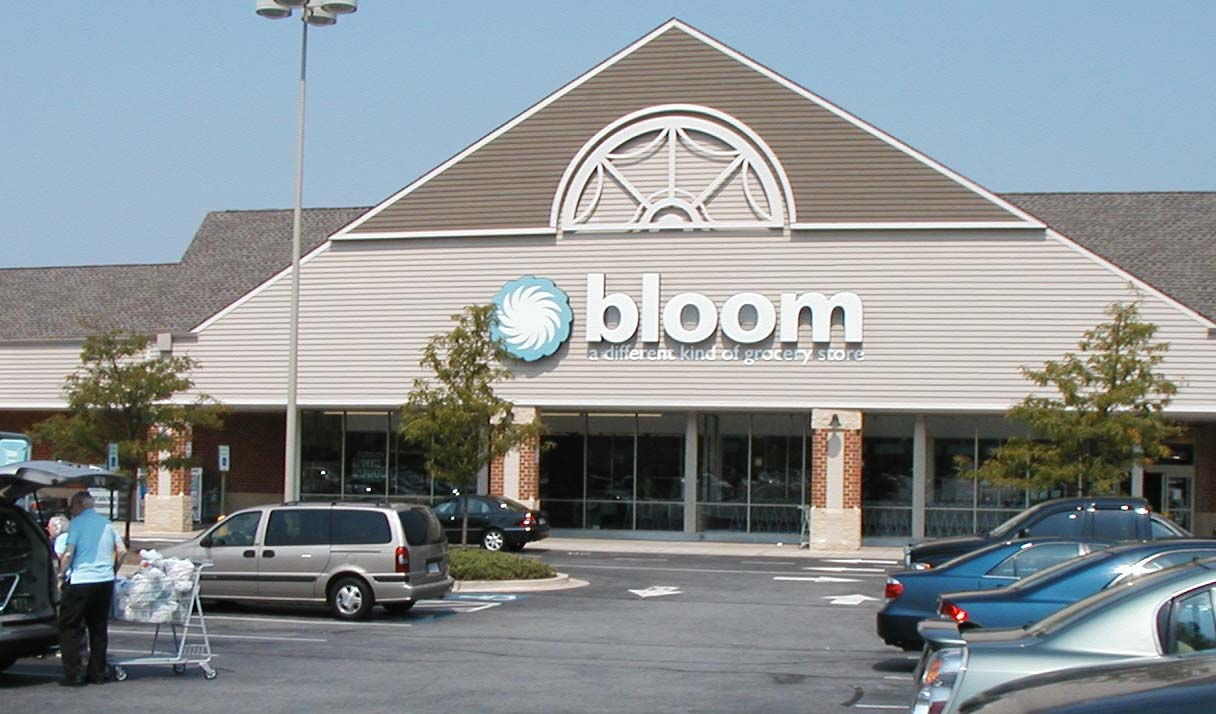
Bloom store in Accokeek, Maryland. Since 2016, it has been a Weis Markets store.

Bloom was Food Lion's upscale grocery model that opened on May 26, 2004.

As of December 2009, 65 Bloom stores were in North Carolina, South Carolina, Maryland, and Virginia.

On March 14, 2011, Delhaize announced that all Bloom supermarkets in North and South Carolina would close or be converted to the Food Lion banner.

On January 11, 2012, Delhaize announced that the Bloom brand would be discontinued and that all Bloom supermarkets would either convert to Food Lion or permanently close.

=== Bottom Dollar Food ===
Bottom Dollar Food was Food Lion's discount grocery model that focused on offering a limited selection of both national brands and private label products. These stores had no bakeries or delis and more items were packaged. Customers bought the bags used to sack their own groceries at Bottom Dollar Food. Stores also used alternative display and stocking techniques such as cut cases on shelves, and using pallets and dump bins to reduce costs. Food Lion opened the first Bottom Dollar Food model in High Point, North Carolina, on September 21, 2005.

As of December 2009, Bottom Dollar Food had 28 stores in North Carolina, Maryland, Pennsylvania, and Virginia. In January 2012, Delhaize announced that it would close six Bottom Dollar stores and convert 22 others to Food Lion supermarkets as part of a restructuring. In August 2014, it was reported that Delhaize was putting the entire portfolio of Bottom Dollar Food locations up for sale. Ultimately Bottom Dollar Food was shuttered and the stores sold to Aldi in early 2015.

=== Harveys Supermarket ===
Harveys stores are mainly located in rural markets within the Deep South. In May 2013, all Harveys stores were sold to BI-LO LLC.

=== Reid's ===
Reid's was a small chain of stores located in various rural South Carolina communities. The chain's history can trace back to 1972, when its namesake founder Reid Boylston opened his first store in Barnwell, South Carolina. Most of these stores were all formerly branded as Food Lion stores and continue to carry Food Lion branded goods and use the Food Lion infrastructure. In May 2013, Reid's was sold along with its sister supermarket chains Harveys and Sweetbay to BI-LO LLC for $265 million. BI-LO subsequently retired the Reid's name, rebranding the Reid's stores as BI-LO.

== Store brand ==
Delhaize America stores use common private brands called Home 360, Nature's Promise, CHA-CHING, and Taste of Inspirations. Sister supermarkets Hannaford and Sweetbay were the last two stores to make the switch, doing so in 2010 and 2011. The move is designed to simplify the company's store-brand products line. Food Lion stores have the My Essentials brand, as well as the Hannaford brand. At the end of 2014, the My Essentials, as well as the Home 360 names, were retired and the more traditional Food Lion brand name was used as a replacement.

== Slogans ==
- "LFPINC (LFPISC or LFPIVA)": During the Food Town era, the slogan stood for "Lowest Food Prices In North Carolina". Also, it was used in South Carolina, Virginia, and Georgia stores.
- "6800 Low Prices": late 1970s–1985
- "Extra Low Prices": 1985–2004
- "Good Neighbors, Great Prices": 2004–2011
- "Get Your Lion's Share": 2011–2014
- "Easy, fresh and affordable... You can count on Food Lion... Every day": 2014–2015
- "Life's Better with the Lion": 2015–2016
- "How Refreshing": 2016–2019
- "This is Our Home. That's Our Food Lion": 2019–2024
- "You Can Count On Us" (see weekly flyers): 2024-present

== Controversies ==
=== Union organizing ===
During the late 1980s and early 1990s, the United Food and Commercial Workers Union Local 400 alleged that Food Lion had underpaid its workers and engaged in unfair labor practices for many years. Food Lion spokesman Michael Mozingo denied the allegations, stating that "We don't pay less. Our wages are comparable in every market we operate." In 1990, labor leaders in Virginia called for a boycott of Food Lion, accusing the chain of paying workers substandard wages and blocking attempts by store workers to unionize. In Belgium, labor organizers observed the American Labor Day as a statement of solidarity with Food Lion labor organizers.

=== Primetime Live controversy ===
In the 1990s, Food Lion gained a degree of notoriety when it was the subject of an ABC News investigation. ABC had received a tip about unsanitary practices at Food Lion. Two ABC reporters had posed as Food Lion employees, and witnessed the unsanitary practices at Food Lion. Much of what they had seen was videotaped with cameras hidden in wigs that they were wearing. The footage was then featured in a segment on the news magazine Primetime Live, in which Food Lion employees described unsanitary practices, which included bleaching discolored, expired pork with Clorox and repackaging expired meats with new expiration dates, and the use of nail polish remover to remove the expiration dates from dairy item packages.

The company responded by suing ABC for fraud, claiming that the ABC employees misrepresented themselves; for trespassing, because the ABC employees came on to Food Lion property without permission; and for breach of duty of loyalty, because the ABC employees videotaped nonpublic areas of the store and revealed internal company information. During the court battles between Food Lion and ABC, over 40 hours of unused footage were released that helped Food Lion's case. In the unused footage, two undercover producers are seen trying to encourage violations of company policy; however, employees resisted and correctly followed sanitary practices.

Food Lion was awarded US$5.5 million by a jury in 1997. The award was later reduced by a judge to $316,000. The verdict was then largely overturned by the U.S. Court of Appeals Fourth Circuit in Richmond, Virginia. According to the court: even though ABC was wrong to do what they had done, Food Lion was not suing for defamation, but rather for tort as a way to get around the strict First Amendment standards for defamation. Food Lion did this because the company was not contesting the truth of anything ABC reported in the broadcast. However, the appellate court upheld the finding that the producers involved breached their duty of loyalty as employees to Food Lion, and had trespassed, awarding a nominal $2 fine.

=== Religious discrimination ===
In 2014, Food Lion was sued for religious discrimination by the Equal Employment Opportunity Commission after a meat cutter at a Winston-Salem Food Lion was fired for declining to work on Sundays or Thursday evenings. The meat cutter was a Jehovah's Witness minister who was required to attend religious services and meetings on those days. The EEOC sought back pay and compensatory and punitive damages. Food Lion agreed to pay the worker $50,500.

== See also ==
- Mega Image
