= Direct Selling Europe =

Trade federation

Direct Selling Europe (DSE) is a federation of trade associations founded in 2007 to represent the interests of the European direct selling industry in the European Union. It was founded by national direct selling associations from Austria, Belgium, Germany and Switzerland, and 10 European-based direct selling companies (AMC International AG, Déesse AG, Eismann, inmediaOne, Just International AG, Lux International AG, Pierre Lang Europe, Tupperware Brands Corporation, Vorwerk & Co AG, and WIV International AG).

Since then, four other companies joined DSE, including Avon Products.

== Members ==
=== Associations ===
- Direct Selling Association of Germany
- Professional Association of Direct Selling of Belgium
- Swiss Direct Selling Association
- Austrian Direct Selling Association
- Italian Direct Selling Association

=== Companies ===
- AMC International
- Avon Products
- Déesse AG
- JAFRA Cosmetics
- Just International AG
- Lux International AG
- Nutrimetics
- Tupperware Brands Corporation
- Victoria Benelux
- Vorwerk & Co AG
- WIV International AG
