= Dick Boer =

Dutch businessman

- Born: 31 August 1957 (age 68); Axel, Netherlands
- Occupation: Businessman
- Title: Former CEO, Ahold Delhaize
- Term: 2011–July 2018
- Predecessor: John Rishton
- Successor: Frans Muller
- Children: 4

Dick Boer (born 31 August 1957) is a Dutch businessman. From 2011 to 2018, he was the president and chief executive officer (CEO) of the supermarket chain Ahold Delhaize.

== Early life ==
Boer was born on 31 August 1957.

== Career ==
Boer joined Ahold in 1998, rising to CEO on 1 March 2011, succeeding John Rishton.

On 24 June 2015, when Ahold and Delhaize announced that they were to combine their businesses as Ahold Delhaize, it was stated that Boer would become CEO of the merged company, with Frans Muller, CEO of Delhaize to become deputy CEO and chief integration officer.

In July 2018, Boer retired and was succeeded by his deputy, Frans Muller.

== Other roles ==
Boer is a board member of the Consumer Goods Forum. He is vice-chair of the executive board of The Confederation of Netherlands Industry and Employers (VNO-NCW). He is a member of the advisory board of G-Star Raw. He also has three roles at the World Economic Forum 2017: governor of the consumer industries community, steward of the future of health and healthcare system, and co-chair of the human centric health steering committee. In May 2020, Boer joined the board of Shell plc, and in October 2025, he became vice chairman of Nestlé's board.

== Personal life ==
Boer is married with four children.
