= Conseil du Commerce de France =

Conseil du Commerce de France French Trade Council
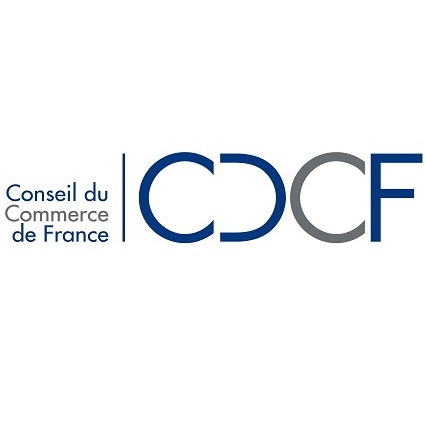
- Formation: 1945
- Type: Voluntary association
- Location(s): 40, Boulevard Malesherbes 75008 Paris
- Region served: France
- Members: 28 (August 2018)
- Leader: Yves Audo
- Staff: 3
- Website: http://www.cdcf.com/

The French Trade Council (Conseil du Commerce de France – CdCF) is an association of twenty-eight professional federations representing both independent and franchised businesses from all sectors.

== Liaison committee ==
Within the CdCF, trade federations meet to express their views on issues relevant to all sectors of commerce where they pool expertise, identify issues and challenges, and determine plans of action to strengthen French trade.

== Trade representation and advocacy ==
From the broad issues identified by its members, the CdCF advocates for the interests of all trade professionals to the relevant French or European authorities on issues of taxation, employment, training, environment, consumption, competition, security, accessibility, etc. All these topics are dealt with in the CdCF's committees and work groups, which are places of exchange and consultation for the member federations.

=== Lobbying activity at the National Assembly ===
The CdCF is registered as a representative of interests before the National Assembly. As such, it declared in 2014 an overall budget of €1,129,000 and indicated that the annual cost related to the direct activities of representing an interest to Parliament were between €20,000 and €30,000.

== Information and expertise ==
On behalf of its members the CdCF monitors legal and regulatory changes.

== Presidents ==
President	Date
Jean-Francis Pécresse	1971–1981
Jacques Dermagne	1981–1999
Baudouin Monnoyeur	2000–2003
Guy Laporte	2003–2005
Gérard Atlan	2005–2016
William G. Koerberlé	2016–2022
Yves Audo	2022-

== See also ==
- Trade association
