= Albert Heijn Jr. =

Dutch supermarket tycoon (1927–2011)

Albert Heijn
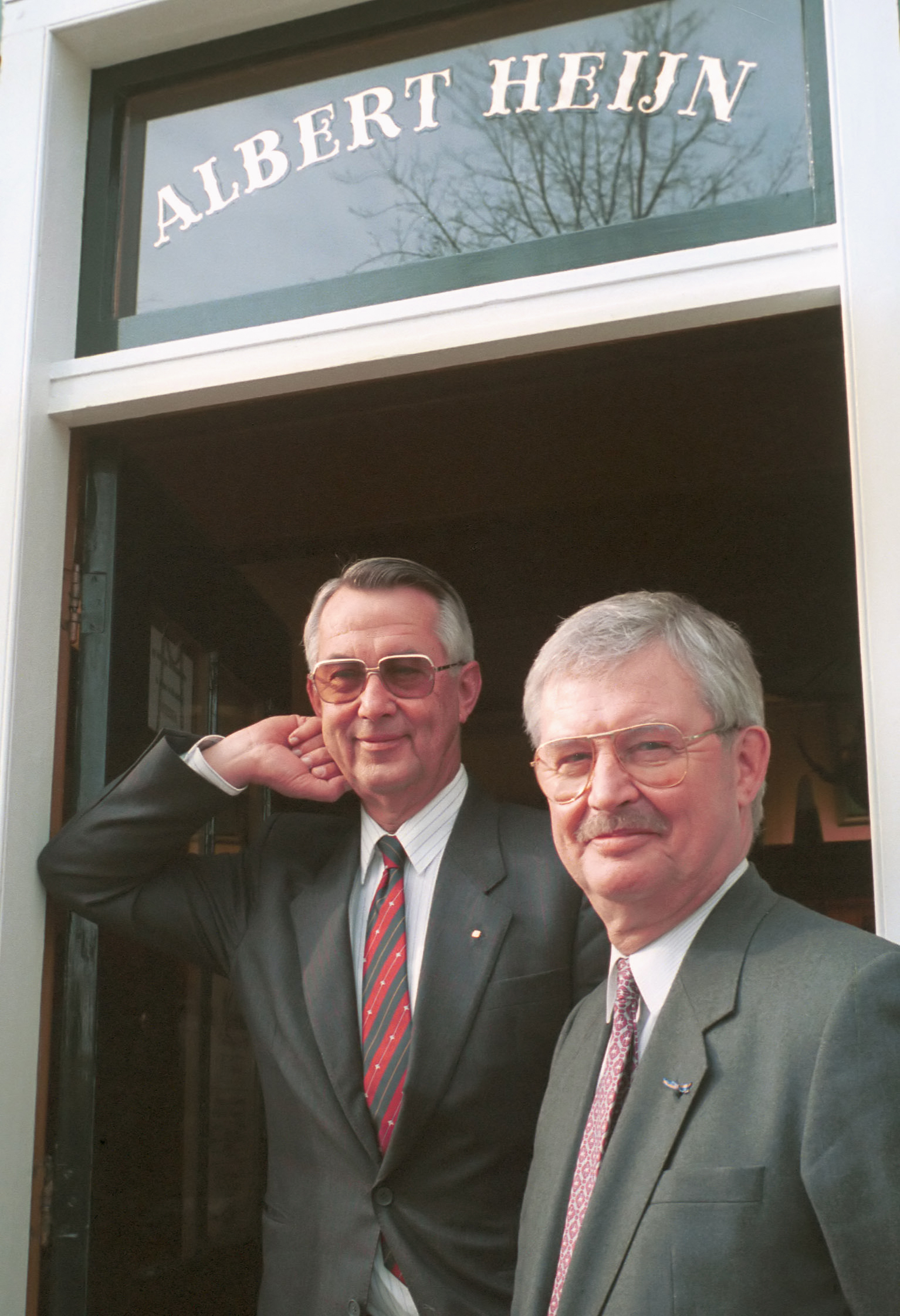
- Albert (r.) and Gerrit Jan Heijn in front of the Albert Heijn museum (1987)
- Born: Albert Heijn; 25 January 1927; Zaandam, Netherlands
- Died: 13 January 2011 (aged 83); Hereford, England, UK
- Occupation: Grocer
- Known for: Founding Ahold and expanding Albert Heijn
- Title: Founder and Chairman of Ahold
- Spouses: Herma Maria Schipper (m. 1951) Louise Maria Keller (m. 1974; died 1982) Olga Sophia Catharina van der Poel (m. 1984; died 1990) Monique Marcella Frédérique Everwijn Lange (m. 1992)
- Parents: Jan Heijn (father); Adriana Hendrika Kruger (mother)
- Relatives: Gerrit Jan Heijn (brother); Albert Heijn Sr. (grandfather); Ronald Jan Heijn (nephew)
- Awards: Commander of the Order of Orange-Nassau; Knight of the Order of the Netherlands Lion

Albert Heijn (Zaandam, 25 January 1927 – Hereford, 13 January 2011) was a Dutch entrepreneur, major stockholder and founder and chairman of the board of Ahold.

Albert was the grandson of his namesake Albert Heijn (1865–1945), who began the family business with a single grocery store in Oostzaan and after extending to multiple stores laid the foundation of the same named leading Dutch retail chain, which was expanded by Albert into a multinational company. Albert introduced the supermarket store model in the Netherlands and was instrumental in several innovations in the retail industry such as the passing of an international standard for bar codes in 1974. He was CEO of Ahold until 1989.

His brother and business partner Gerrit Jan Heijn was murdered after being kidnapped in September 1987.

In 1989 he was honored with the Sidney R. Rabb Award by the Food Marketing Institute making him the first non-American to win this award.

Albert Heijn had lived at Pudleston Court in Herefordshire, England for many years when he died, and was in no way formally involved with Ahold at the time of his death, although he at times commented upon the state of the company. In Hereford he founded a new company called Eign Enterprises (named after the English pronunciation of his surname) which established shops, restaurants, hotels and other enterprises in the local region. For this he was named Honorary Freeman of the City of Hereford in 2002.

In an interview Albert told how proud he was that he contributed to the fact that shoppers were able to buy more goods for less money: ‘I may be a born businessman, but I still feel more empathy for the shopper than for businesses who are only concerned with their stock price and their latest takeover bid. I’m proud that my passport lists my profession as “grocer”. It’s one of the finest professions in the world."
