= Ahold Delhaize =

Dutch multinational retail and wholesaling company

Koninklijke Ahold Delhaize N.V.

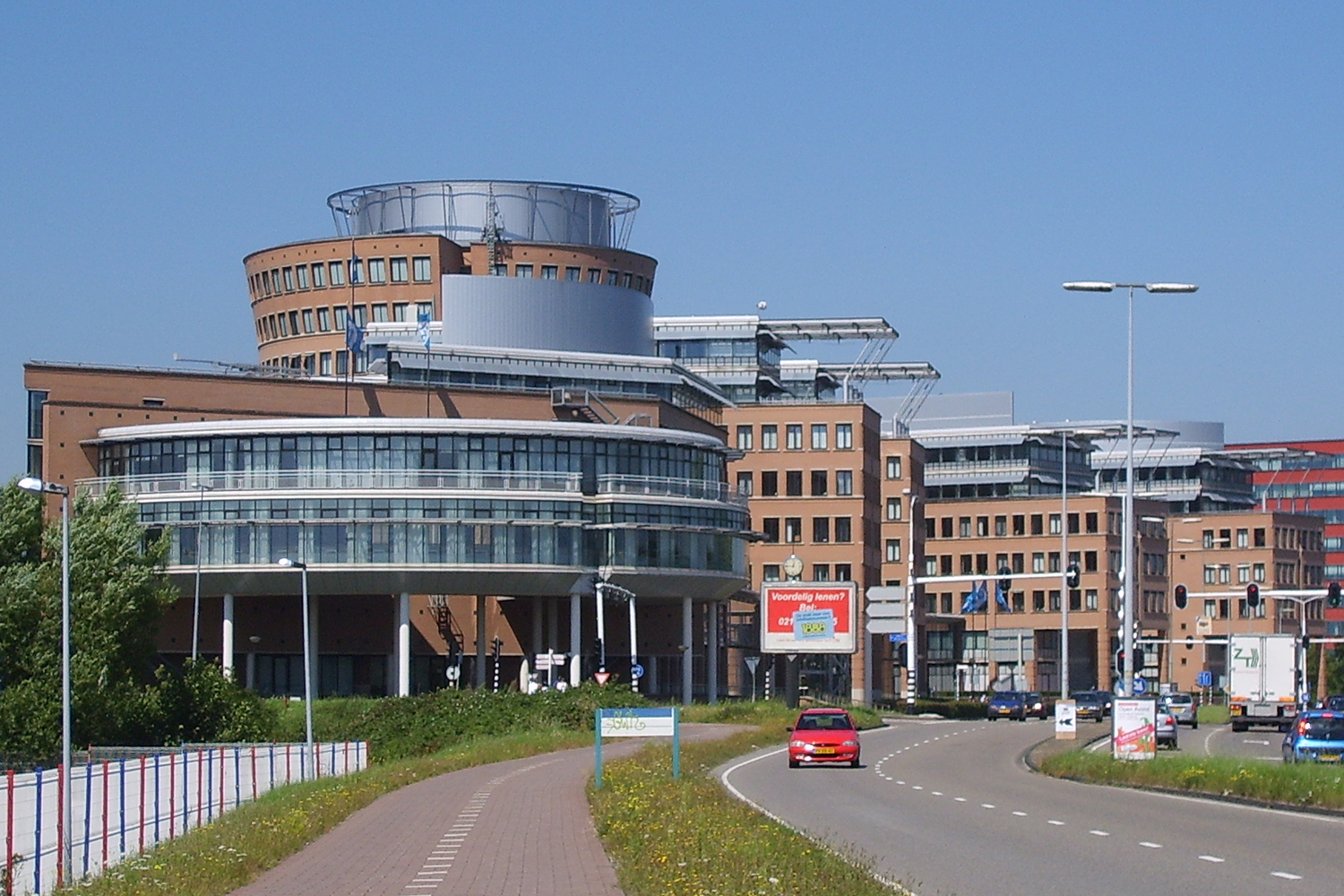
- Ahold Delhaize headquarters in Zaandam, Netherlands
- Type: Public (N.V.)
- Traded as: Euronext Amsterdam: AD; AEX component
- ISIN: NL0011794037
- Industry: Retail; Wholesaling
- Predecessors: Ahold; Delhaize Group
- Founded: 25 July 2016
- Headquarters: Zaandam, Netherlands
- Number of locations: 7,910 (2024)
- Key people: Frans Muller (President and CEO); Claire Peters (CEO Ahold Delhaize USA); Wouter Kolk (CEO Ahold Delhaize Europe and Indonesia); Jolanda Poots-Bijl (CFO)
- Revenue: ▲€89.4 billion (2024)
- Net income: ▲€1.8 billion (2024)
- Number of employees: 414,000
- Website: www.aholddelhaize.com

Koninklijke Ahold Delhaize N.V. (lit. 'Royal Ahold Delhaize'), commonly known as Ahold Delhaize, is a Dutch multinational retail and wholesale holding company. Its name comes from the 2016 merger of two companies: Ahold (Dutch) and Delhaize Group (Belgian), which both have origins in the 1800s. Its business format includes supermarkets, convenience stores, hypermarkets, online grocery, online non-food, pharmacies, and liquor stores. Its 16 local brands employ 402,000 people at 7,716 stores across nine countries. The United States is where two-thirds of the holding company's revenue is generated.

Ahold Delhaize's global headquarters is in Zaandam, just north of Amsterdam. Other countries with Ahold Delhaize businesses include the Czech Republic, Greece, Luxembourg, Romania, Serbia, and the United States. It also participates in joint ventures in Indonesia and Portugal.

Ahold Delhaize shares are listed on Euronext Amsterdam and Brussels (ticker: AD). Ahold's CEO, Dick Boer, became the CEO of Ahold Delhaize until his retirement in 2018, and Frans Muller, the former CEO of Delhaize Group, succeeded Boer, after previously having worked under Boer's supervision, as the deputy CEO, chief integration officer and acting chief operations officer (ad interim) of Delhaize America.

Operating more than 2,000 stores of multiple brands across 23 U.S. states, Ahold Delhaize is among the largest food and consumables retailers in the United States via its regional subsidiaries.

== History ==
Ahold Delhaize was formed in July 2016 from the merger of Ahold and Delhaize Group. Delhaize Group dates back to 1867, when the Delhaize brothers opened a shop in Charleroi, Belgium. Ahold, originally named Albert Heijn N.V., started in 1887 when Albert Heijn bought the general store of his father in the Dutch town of Oostzaan, bordering the cities of Zaandam (Ahold Delhaize's current HQ) to the west and Amsterdam to the south. He gave the store his name and transformed it into a modern specialized grocery together with his wife, Neeltje Heijn. After a few years, he owned a chain of Dutch stores.

In 2018, the company experienced significant growth in the United States (Food Lion), the Netherlands, and online. Growth in Belgium has been minimal.

With around 380,000 employees in almost 7,000 stores, the company achieved a turnover of €66 billion in 2019.

From 2019 to 2022, the company funded a research project at Delft University of Technology exploring the use of robotics and artificial intelligence in retail, including the potential ability to stock groceries on shelves.

Beginning in June 2020, Ahold Delhaize implemented a partnership with Instacart to provide home delivery from more than 750 stores operated under the Hannaford, Food Lion, Giant Food, and Stop & Shop brands. The company further expanded in the United States with the acquisition of a majority stake in FreshDirect, an online grocer. As of 2021, Ahold Delhaize has plans to establish Ship2Me, an online marketplace featuring food and merchandise items, in the second half of the year.

In November 2023, Ahold Delhaize sold FreshDirect to Turkish company Getir. Part of the reason for the sale was so that Ahold Delhaize, specifically Ahold Delhaize USA, could focus more on the "omnichannel experience" and to strengthen its presence in supermarkets and online.

As of 2023, Ahold Delhaize announced the acquisition of Romanian retailer Profi for approximately €1.3 billion from Mid Europa Partners.

In 2025, Ahold Delhaize disclosed that it had been the target of a 2024 cyberattack, which resulted in the exfiltration of personal data for upwards of 2.2 million current and former employees (as well as their dependents and beneficiaries).

In June 2026, Claire Peters was appointed as the new CEO of Ahold Delhaize USA replacing Jerry W Fleeman.

In October 2026, Ahold Delhaize announced the acquisition of Tesco's Czech and Slovak operations for approximately €1.7 billion. Pending regulatory approval, the deal is set to close in late 2027.

== Brands and stores ==
Country	Brand	Number of stores
Netherlands	Albert Heijn	1,268
Netherlands	Etos	523
Netherlands	Gall & Gall	628
Netherlands	Bol.com	0 (web store)
Belgium	Albert Heijn	80
Belgium	Delhaize	818
Czech Republic	Albert	340
Greece	Alpha-Beta	585
Greece	ENA	14
Indonesia	Super Indo	180
Luxembourg	Delhaize	65
Romania	Mega Image	977
Romania	Profi	1,808
Serbia	Maxi	529
United States	Food Lion	1,108
United States	The Giant Company	193
United States	Giant Food	165
United States	Hannaford	187
United States	Stop & Shop	365
Total		9,833

== Animal welfare ==
In 2016, Ahold Delhaize USA stated that it would stop sourcing eggs from hens confined in battery cages and pork from crated pigs by the end of 2025. In December 2024, it extended the target dates, aiming for 70% cage-free egg sales by the end of 2030 and 100% by the end of 2032, and 100% crate-free pork by the end of 2028.

After extending the implementation timeline, Ahold Delhaize and its subsidiaries faced pressure from consumer activist and animal welfare organizations over its failure to meet its initial commitments. In 2025, protesters demonstrated outside Food Lion headquarters in Salisbury, North Carolina, and near Hannaford headquarters in Portland, Maine. Josh Balk, a former vice president of the US Humane Society and CEO of The Accountability Board, identified Ahold Delhaize as one of the least transparent retailers on cage-free sourcing.

In response to the activist pressure, Ahold Delhaize made updated commitments to transparency in 2026, and made new commitments on the timeline to full implementation of its 2032 pledge. These included commitments to a 30% reduction in caged SKUs relative to the 2025 baseline in 2026, and a 60% reduction by 2028. The company also pledged to introduce clearer signage in stores to discourage consumers from buying caged eggs. These measures won plaudits from animal advocacy groups, who called on competitors like Kroger and Target to adopt similar measures.
