= Albert Heijn (businessman) =

Dutch businessman

- Born: Albert Heijn; 15 October 1865; Oostzaan, Netherlands
- Died: 13 November 1945 (aged 80); Amsterdam, Netherlands
- Occupation: Grocer
- Known for: Founder of Albert Heijn
- Spouse: Neeltje de Ridder (m. 1887)
- Parents: Jan Heijn (father); Antje de Ridder (mother)
- Relatives: Albert Heijn Jr. (grandson); Gerrit Jan Heijn (grandson); Ronald Jan Heijn (great-grandson)
- Awards: Knight of the Order of Orange-Nassau

Albert Heijn (15 October 1865 – 13 November 1945) was a Dutch entrepreneur who was the original founder of Albert Heijn, which is now the largest food retailer in the Netherlands.

== Biography ==
Albert Heijn was born in Oostzaan on the 15th of October 1865, the son of Jan Heijn and Antje de Ridder. His parents ran a successful store in the town.

On 27 May 1887, he married Neeltje de Ridder. On the same day, he took over his parents' store. The supermarket chain founded by his grandson Albert Jr. still carries the Albert Heijn name.

The first Albert Heijn store still exists as a Museum at Zaanse Schans near Amsterdam in the Netherlands.

Heijn handed over the management of the company in 1920, to his sons Jan Heijn and Gerrit Heijn, and his son-in-law Johan Hille. Later, his grandchildren Albert Jr. and Gerrit Jan Heijn would further expand the family business.

Heijn died on November 13 1945 in Amsterdam.
