= Clemens Markets =

American supermarket chain

Clemens Markets was a supermarket chain in the Philadelphia area, founded in 1939. It was family-owned from the founding of its first store in Lansdale, Pennsylvania to the sale of the company in 2006.

== History ==
Clemens was one of three independent supermarket chains to identify as "family markets" in Greater Philadelphia. Another was Genuardi's, which was sold to Safeway Inc. in 2000. The last one was Giunta's, which went out of business soon after Clemens. During the 1980s and 1990s, Clemens expanded by opening many new locations; eventually Clemens operated 20 supermarkets in three Pennsylvania counties, moving its headquarters to Kulpsville, Pennsylvania in 1993. The chain eventually acquired many Thriftway/Shop 'n Bag franchises. Many of these were also former Acme, A&P, Food Fair, and Penn Fruit stores. Clemens later acquired many former Shop 'n Save stores which themselves started as Super G. In 1999, it introduced its upscale FoodSource division, which had three locations. One of these stores was a former Zagara's, a gourmet supermarket chain itself a division of Genuardi's and later Safeway.

== Sale ==
In late 2006, Clemens was acquired by Giant-Carlisle, but several of its stores in Montgomery and Bucks counties in Pennsylvania were sold to Super Fresh. Two of the three FoodSource stores have been closed since the buyout. The remaining store is now owned by Giant Food Stores.
