= The Giant Company =

American supermarket chain

- Formerly: Giant Food Stores
- Type: Subsidiary of Ahold Delhaize
- Industry: Retail
- Founded: 1923 (103 years ago)
- Founder: David Javitch
- Headquarters: Carlisle, Pennsylvania, U.S.
- Number of locations: 193 stores (156 Giant stores, 34 Martin's stores, 133 pharmacies, 107 fuel stations, and over 175 online pickup hubs)
- Areas served: Pennsylvania; Maryland; Virginia; West Virginia; New Jersey (online delivery through Giant Direct)
- Key people: John Ruane (President)
- Services: Grocery; Event planning; Money services; Online shopping and home delivery
- Number of employees: 35,000+ (September 2020)
- Parent: Ahold Delhaize
- Subsidiaries: Martin's Foods; Giant Heirloom Market
- Website: giantfoodstores.com martinsfoods.com

Giant logo used before re-branding in 2020. Some stores still use this logo as of 2024.

The Giant Company, formerly known as Giant Food Stores, is an American regional supermarket chain headquartered in Carlisle, Pennsylvania. The company operates in stores in Pennsylvania, Maryland, Virginia, and West Virginia under the Giant and Martin's brands. It is a subsidiary of Ahold Delhaize. As of May 2025, the company operated 193 stores, 133 pharmacies, and 107 fuel stations. The chain also provides online shopping and delivery to New Jersey through Giant Direct.

The Giant Company is often known as Giant-Carlisle or Giant/Martin's to distinguish it from Giant Food, a Maryland-headquartered sister chain also owned by Ahold Delhaize and often referred to as Giant-Landover.

== History ==
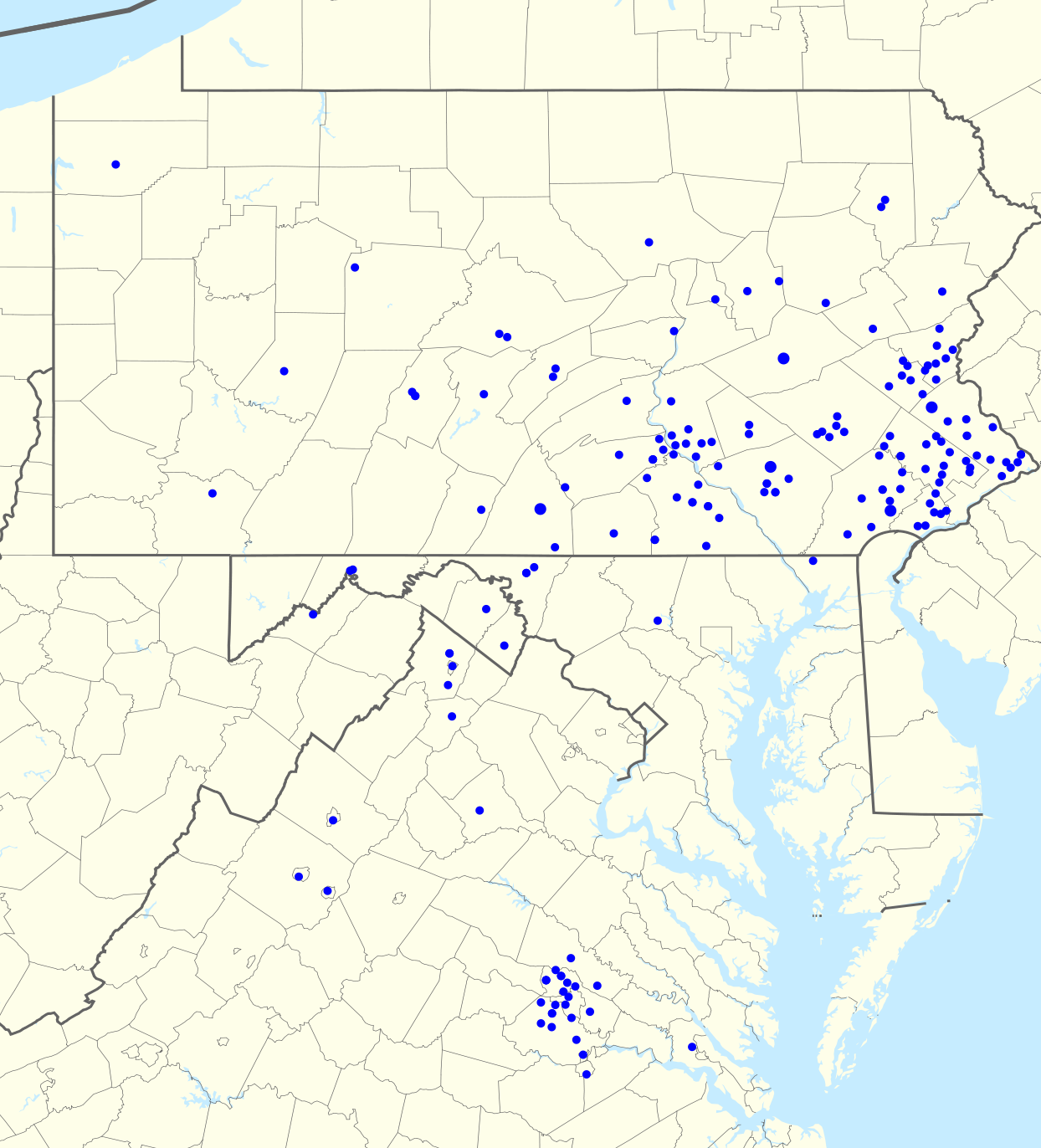
Map of Giant-Carlisle stores as of 2011. Stores located in Maryland, Virginia, West Virginia, and parts of Western Pennsylvania are Martin's stores; the remainder are Giant stores.

=== Early history ===
The retail company launched in 1923 when David Javitch opened a small meat market in Carlisle, Pennsylvania, called Carlisle Meat Market. In 1936, Javitch purchased a store in Lewistown, Pennsylvania, which he named the Giant Shopping Food Center. It was a major change from the original Carlisle Meat Market in that it was a total grocery store. The new store offered dry goods and perishables under one roof; a new concept at that time. The store was a success, and soon a decision was made to expand the original Carlisle store from a basic meat market into a full-fledged grocery store.

The business also experienced a number of setbacks. Prior to purchasing the Lewistown store, Javitch purchased a store in Hagerstown, Maryland, that opened and closed within the same month. In addition, his main store in Carlisle was destroyed by fire, and the Lewistown store was completely flooded on two separate occasions.

=== Expansion ===
After each setback, Javitch started over and the stores continued to grow in the 1950s. Shopping malls became a new American experience with the population moving outside of the cities and into the suburbs, and Javitch took advantage of the strip malls dotting the landscape. As a result, the company embarked on a plan of steady growth, opening new stores in suburban areas. Javitch moved his downtown Carlisle store to a newly built structure at 100 North Hanover Street in 1953, renaming it Carlisle Food Market. The Carlisle store was very modern for its time, with features like a parking lot, baggers, and outside lighting. A second Carlisle Food Market location opened in 1964 at the Carlisle Plaza Shopping Center. The company continued to open other stores under the Giant Foods name.

In 1968, the ninth store opened in Harrisburg, Pennsylvania. David Javitch became chairman of the board, passing the presidency to his son, Lee Javitch. The company's growth accelerated with the purchase of the Martin’s chain (though these stores retain the Martin’s name to this day) in Hagerstown, Maryland. The company purchased the Martin's chain, based in Hagerstown, in 1969, and expanded to New Jersey in 1970, opening three stores under the name Clover-Markets.

A new merchandising effort began with the introduction of "Everyday Low Prices." By 1973, the company's 50th anniversary, the company operated a total of 18 stores. In 1974, David Javitch died, and Lee established the David Javitch Memorial Scholarship Fund to benefit children of Giant/Martin’s employees. As the 1970s closed, 24 stores were in operation. Nick Riso was appointed president, and Lee Javitch assumed the position of chairman. As the 1980s approached, the company had grown to a workforce of 3,400.

=== 1981 acquisition by Ahold ===
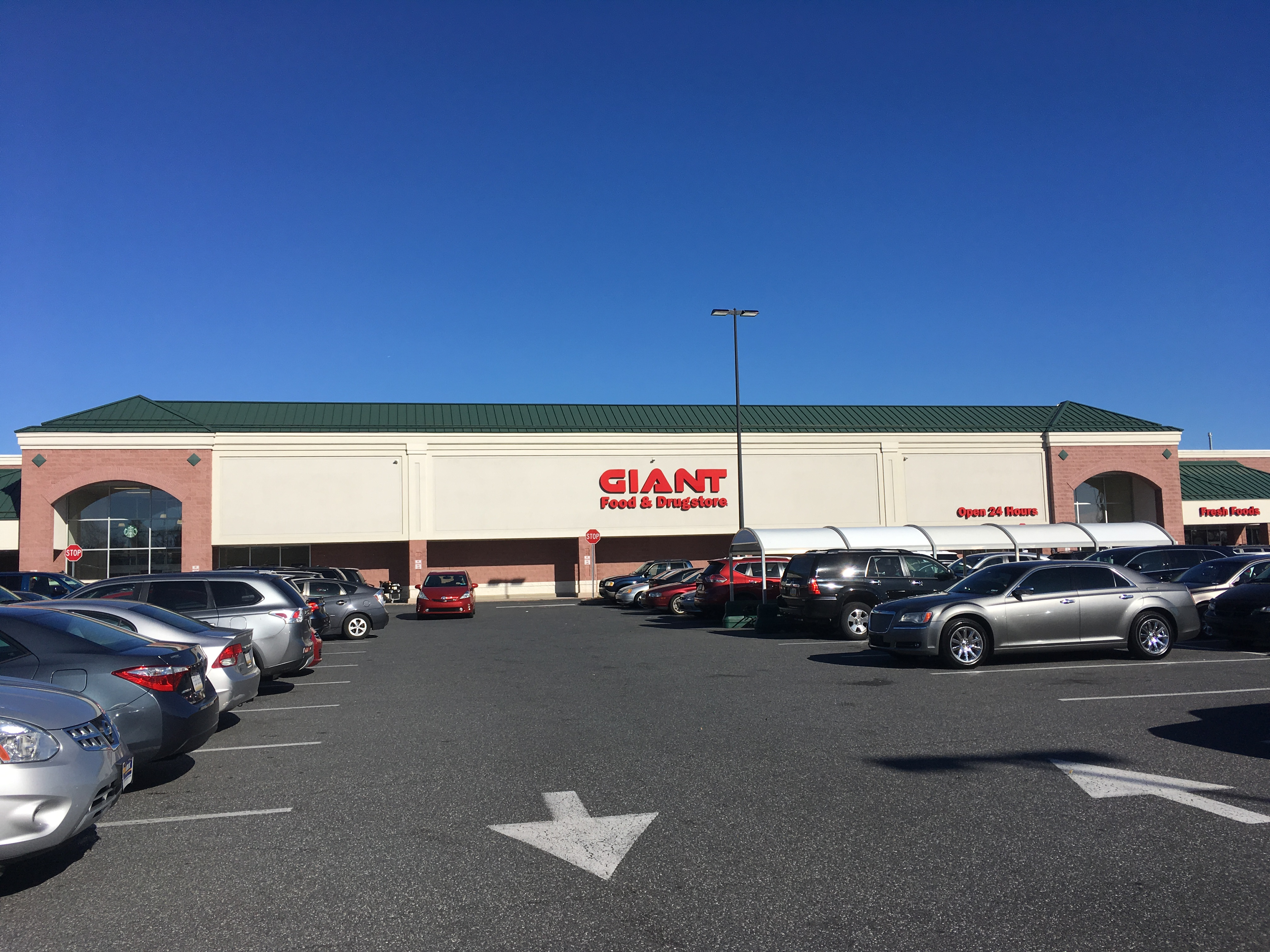
A Giant supermarket in Lancaster, Pennsylvania

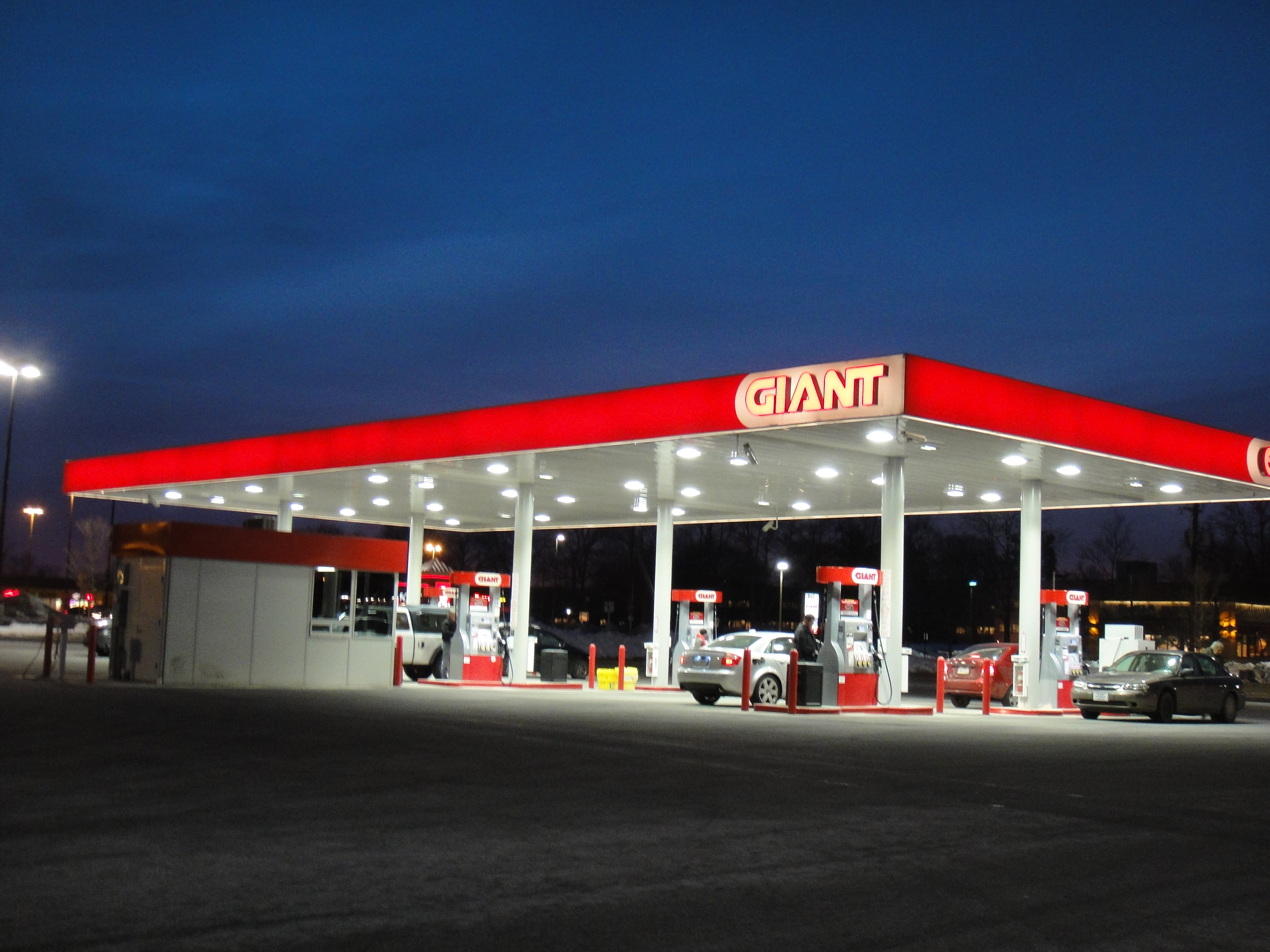
A Giant gas station in Trexlertown, Pennsylvania

In 1981, the Javitch family sold the company to Royal Ahold Corporation, a food retailing business based in Zaandam, the Netherlands. At the time of the agreement, Giant was operating 29 supermarkets. Throughout the 1980s, Giant continued to grow. In 1988, Allan Noddle assumed the position of President of Giant Food Stores, as the 50th Giant store opened. Noddle served as a spokesman in Giant's radio and television advertising campaigns.

The late 1980s through mid-1990s saw a complete modernization of Giant and Martin's stores as remodels, expansions, and interior upgrades were completed in virtually every store within the chain. In addition, many new customer conveniences were added including in-store banks, pharmacies, Chinese kitchens, coffee shops, photo processing, and dry cleaning services. By the end of 1996, Giant had grown to 75 stores.

In 1997, Giant merged with Edwards Super Food Stores, another Ahold-owned company. Upon completion of the merger, Giant was operating two divisions, with 23,000 employees in six states including Maryland, New Jersey, New York, Pennsylvania, Virginia, and West Virginia. Additionally, Tony Schiano became president and CEO of Giant.

=== 2000s ===
As 2000 approached, Giant Food Stores underwent many technological changes. In addition, the first new prototype store opened in Hellertown, Pennsylvania and additional new stores opened with shopping conveniences for customers including gas stations, full-service floral departments, smoothie and juice bars, expanded deli and bakery departments, and organic produce under their Nature's Promise brand. The new millennium brought about additional change within the organization, as Edwards transitioned to another Ahold-owned company, Stop & Shop. The Edwards stores throughout New Jersey and New York were remodeled and reopened under the Stop & Shop banner. With the major change, Giant concentrated on its plans to expand, and opened stores in new market areas such as Altoona, Pennsylvania.

In 2001, Giant formed an alliance with another Ahold company, Tops Markets, LLC in Buffalo, New York. The new partnership, called Shared Services, was designed to allow both companies to continue to operate individually as separate and distinct businesses while partnering to support corporate functions. U-Scan self checkout registers were implemented company-wide, and a new marketing campaign, "Quality. Selection. Savings. Every Day" was introduced. Giant Food Stores also began sponsoring the Giant Center arena in Hershey, Pennsylvania, the home of the Hershey Bears hockey team, as well as the Skyview at Hersheypark.

Shared Services evolved to the extent that Tops was fully integrated into the Giant organization. On October 12, 2005, Giant opened the doors on a new "Super Giant" in Camp Hill, Pennsylvania, in part due to competition from Wegmans supermarkets moving into the area. Another new Super Giant opened in Willow Grove, Pennsylvania on March 5, 2008, with a total area of 97,300 square feet (9,040 m^{2}), making it Giant's largest store in Pennsylvania. Both stores now operate under the Giant banner.

On September 6, 2006, Jack Clemens of Clemens Family Markets Inc. and his family sold 14 of their 22 stores to Royal Ahold, and eight to C&S Wholesalers. Thirteen of the Ahold stores were rebranded as Giant and one remained branded FoodSource (which was Clemens' upscale gourmet banner), while C&S immediately sold six of the stores to A&P, which re-branded them SuperFresh stores.

On February 1, 2007, Carl Schlicker assumed responsibility as CEO of Giant/Tops, replacing the retiring Schiano. A year later, on July 10, 2008, Royal Ahold announced that Sander van der Laan, at the time the Executive Vice President of Marketing and Merchandising for Albert Heijn (a Dutch supermarket chain owned by Ahold), had been appointed president and CEO of Giant-Carlisle, succeeding Carl Schlicker who had been appointed president and CEO of Stop & Shop/Giant-Landover.

On October 11, 2007, Ahold USA announced the sale of Tops Markets, LLC to Morgan Stanley Private Equity, separating Giant-Carlisle from Tops. It was announced on December 17, 2009, that Giant-Carlisle would purchase the Ukrops chain, expanding their market further into Virginia. These stores operated under the Martin's banner.

=== 2010s ===
Logo of Giant Heirloom Market

On January 7, 2010, it was announced that Rick Herring would become the new president and CEO of Giant-Carlisle.

Giant opened its first grocery store within the limits of the City of Philadelphia in 2011 on Grant Avenue. As of December 14, 2011, Giant and Martin's together have 92 gas stations and they have more than 180 stores in four states.

On January 5, 2012, Giant announced it would acquire 16 Genuardi's Family Markets across the Philadelphia area in a $106 million deal.

In January 2018, Nicholas Bertram became the new President of Giant/Martin's following Tom Lenkevich’s retirement.

In November 2018, Giant-Carlisle announced that it would acquire 5 Shop 'n Save supermarkets from SuperValu, Inc. and operate them under its Martin's Food Markets banner. In 2019, the Giant also acquired one store from Ferguson & Hassler and three stores from Musser’s Markets in Pennsylvania.

In 2019, Giant began the rollout of a robotic assistant named "Marty" to all of its locations. "Marty" travels unassisted around the store and checks for hazards. Giant claims that the addition of the robotic assistant to stores allows for employees to spend more time engaging with customers.

In 2019, Giant introduced Giant Heirloom Market, a smaller store format designed for urban areas. The first Giant Heirloom Market location opened on January 25, 2019, in the Graduate Hospital neighborhood in Philadelphia. Giant Heirloom Market has also opened locations in the Philadelphia neighborhoods of University City and Northern Liberties. The Northern Liberties location also features an underground taproom.

In August 2019, Giant announced it would open a two-story, 65,000-square-foot (6,000 m^{2}) flagship store in Center City Philadelphia as part of the Riverwalk development along the Schuylkill River. The store, which features dedicated shelf space for local vendors, an outdoor terrace, and a free parking garage, opened on March 19, 2021.

In February 2019, the company launched its first e-commerce hub Giant Direct brand for online pickup and delivery orders.

=== 2020s ===
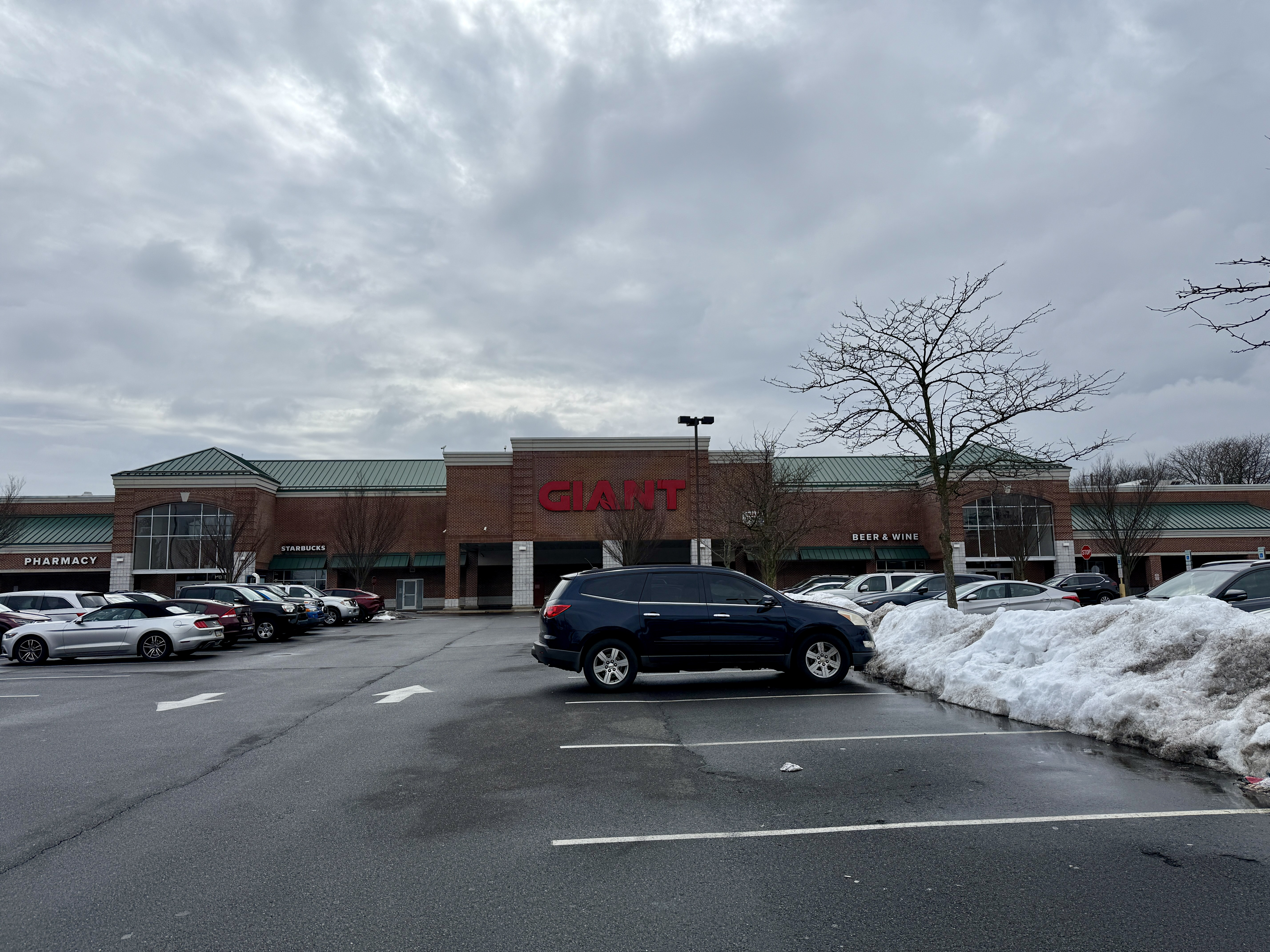
Giant supermarket in Willow Grove, Pennsylvania

In February 2020, Giant Food Stores announced its plans to adopt a new name, The Giant Company, and update logos across its grocery retailer business locations. In August 2020, following the re-branding campaign, the company introduced a new slogan "For Today's Table", with the focus on family values.

The grocery chain temporarily limited some of its vital products in the beginning of the COVID-19 pandemic but over time resumed back to normal practice. The company's officials also used public social media channels to discourage hoarding. Among other measures were reserved shopping time for customers age 60 and older, changing store hours and contactless delivery for online grocery orders through Giant/Martin’s Direct.

In November 2021, the Giant company opened a new Giant Direct E-commerce Fulfillment Center (EFC) on Island Avenue in Philadelphia, Pennsylvania. A 124,000-square-foot facility operates as a distribution center for Giant Direct online orders as well as brick and mortar customers in Philadelphia and southern New Jersey with the claimed capacity of about 15,000 home delivery orders per week. The supermarket chain also partnered with robotics provider Swisslog to automate routine processes in its distribution center, which includes the installation of AutoStore’s robotic storage and retrieval system.

In November and December, Giant opened three new supermarkets, including two in Philadelphia (a 67,000-square-foot store at 2201 Cottman Avenue and a 46,000-square-foot store at 1403 South Christopher Columbus Boulevard), and one in Bucks County, a 72,500-square-foot store in the Cross Keys Place shopping center in Doylestown. On December 16, 2021, a Giant Heirloom Market location opened in the ground level of the former Strawbridge & Clothier flagship department store at the Fashion District Philadelphia. The company retrofitted the 32,000-square-foot space of the historical building while preserving its interior design elements.

Giant also announced plans to open two more stores in Philadelphia, a 50,000-square-foot supermarket on North Broad Street and a 40,000-square-foot supermarket on South Broad Street at the corner of Washington Avenue.

In November 2025, Giant opened a major store, a 68,000-square-foot location in South Mall in Salisbury Township, Pennsylvania, between Allentown and Emmaus.

== Martin's Foods ==
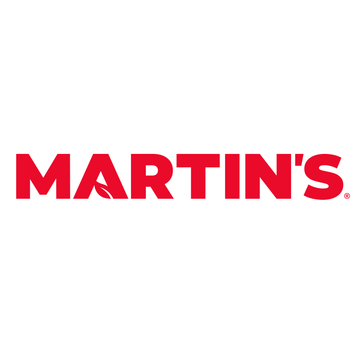
New Martin's logo after rebranding

Martin's logo used before rebranding in 2020

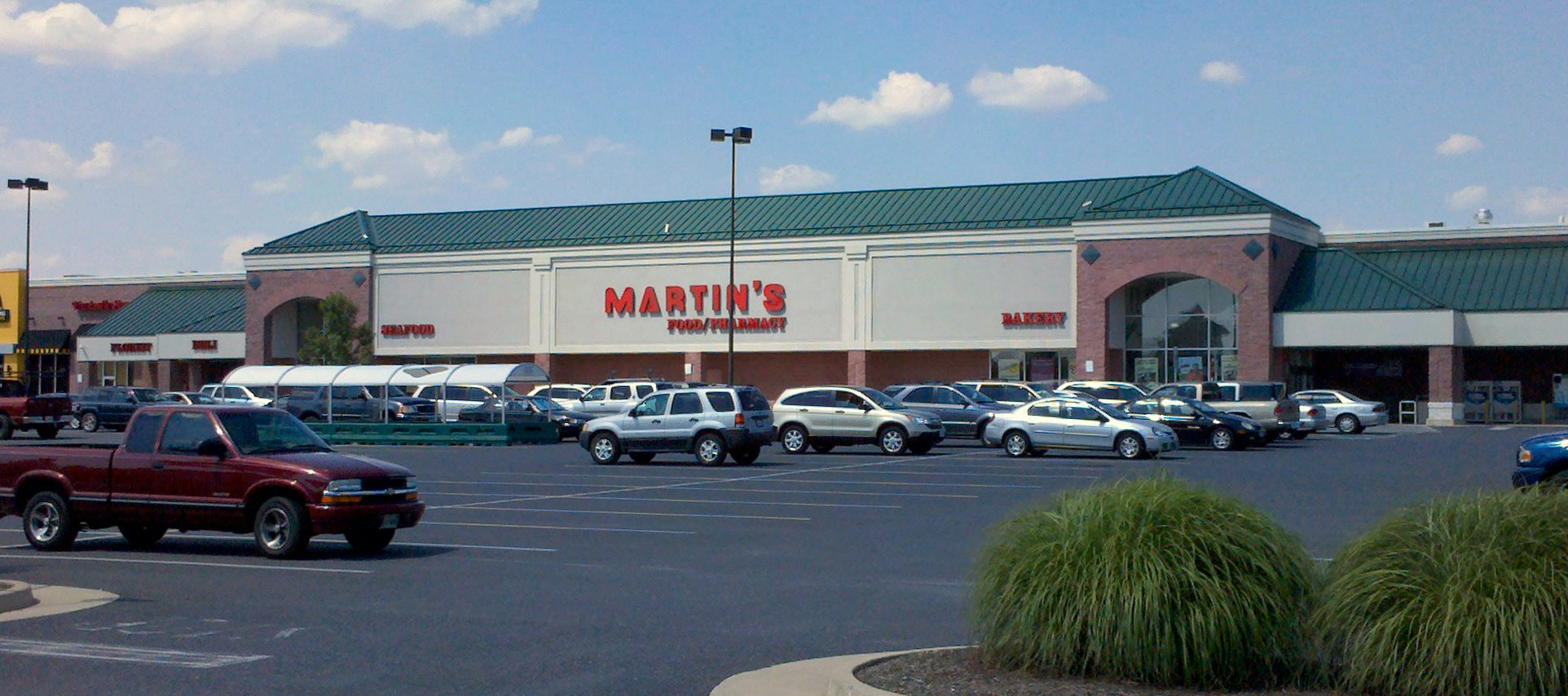
Martin's in Waynesboro, Virginia

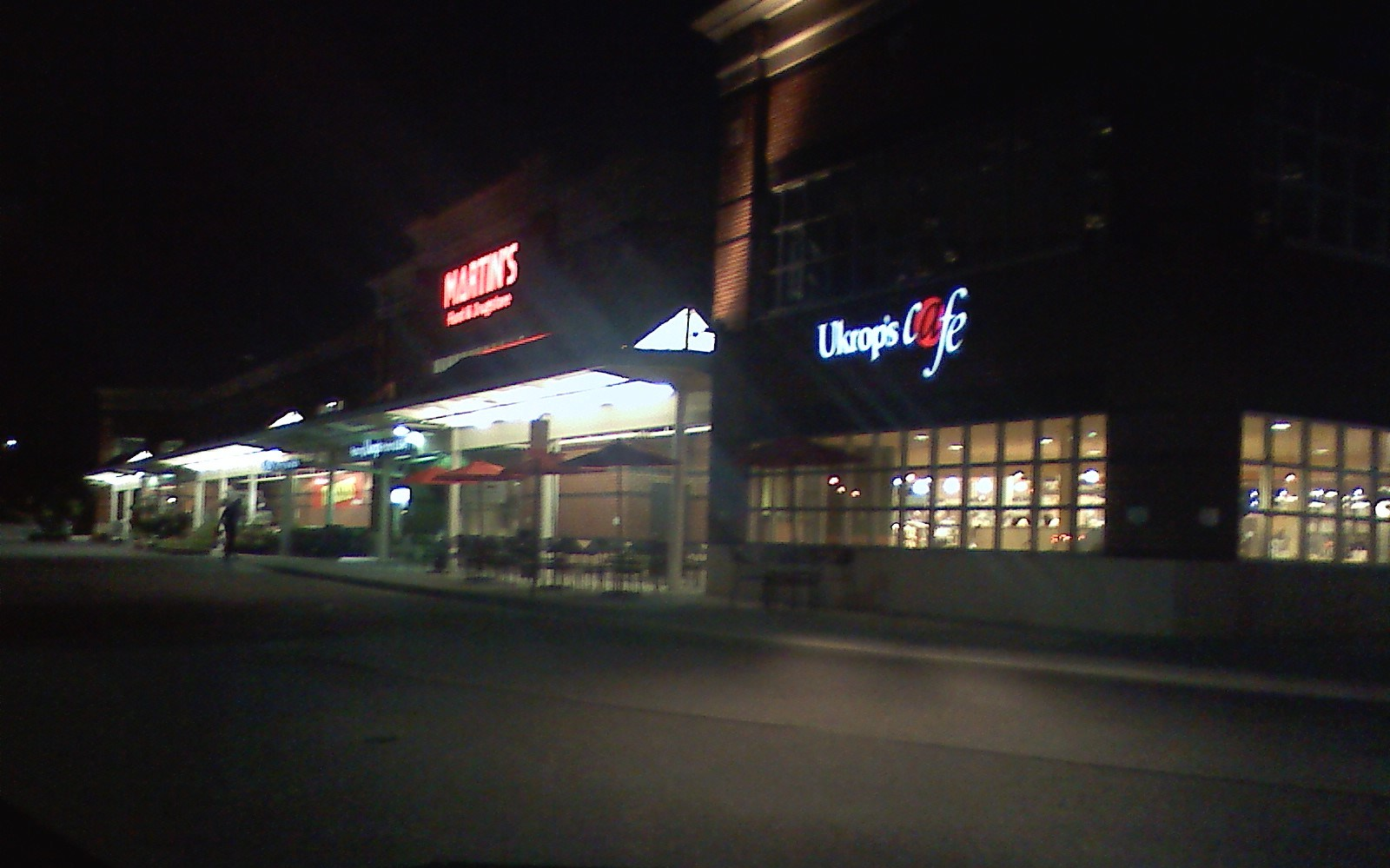
A former Ukrop's location converted to Martin's in Richmond, Virginia

Martin's Foods is a chain of supermarkets operating in Maryland, Virginia, West Virginia, and Western Pennsylvania. Like Giant stores, they are operated by Giant-Carlisle and are owned by Ahold Delhaize. The stores are generally identical to Giant-Carlisle stores. In 1998, when Ahold purchased Giant-Landover, some Martin's stores were closed and sold to other chains to comply with Federal Trade Commission regulations. These locations included stores in Frederick, Carroll, Harford and Cecil counties in Maryland, where the Giant of Landover name was seen as more dominant. However, two stores in this area, in Eldersburg and in Rising Sun, were not sold and continue to operate as Martin's to this day.

The chain, along with Giant-Carlisle, implemented the Bonuscard program in 2000. Around that same time, the chain began selling gasoline in front of its stores.

Since August 2020, the chain's new slogan is "For Today's Table". "Quality. Selection. Savings. Everyday" and "We're with You" were previously used slogans. The majority of Martin's stores are open 24 hours, 7 days a week. Martin's is strong in its trade area, usually being first in market share.

The Martin's name originates from a small chain based in Hagerstown, Maryland. Giant-Carlisle purchased Martin's while expanding in 1968. The name, once known only in Hagerstown, was expanded into nearby Waynesboro, Pennsylvania, Martinsburg, West Virginia, Frederick, Maryland, and Winchester, Virginia. The chain has since expanded further west into Maryland's Allegany County, into West Virginia's Jefferson and Mineral counties, into Virginia's Culpeper and Warren counties, and as far south as Petersburg, Virginia. The Martin's name was extended into west central Pennsylvania upon the purchase of corporate-owned Jubilee Foods stores; these stores use the Martin's banner instead of Giant to avoid confusion with Pittsburgh-based Giant Eagle, which has stores in many of those same markets. Martin's now operates stores in Altoona, Duncansville, Connellsville, Indiana, and DuBois. Despite these locations being located relatively close to Pittsburgh, the Connellsville location is the only store located within the Pittsburgh metropolitan area, and Martin's currently has no plans to further expand into Pittsburgh.

With the purchase of Ukrops Super Markets, Martin's moved even farther into central Virginia, with stores as far south as Petersburg and as far east as Williamsburg. Among the notable differences in the Richmond and Williamsburg stores were that they maintained the Ukrops recipes and brand in the bakery and prepared foods departments, and associates usually carried customers' groceries to their vehicles. These locations offered the Fuelperks-branded fuel program instead of that offered at other Martin's stores. Martin's exited the Richmond metropolitan area in 2017, closing some stores and selling the remainder to Publix Super Markets. The latter was due to Ahold's merger with Delhaize Group, the parent company of Food Lion, which has several stores in the Richmond area, some of which were located in close proximity to the Martin's stores.

== Relationship with Giant-Landover ==
A significant difference between the two chains is that Giant-Landover (of more urban Central Maryland) is unionized while Giant-Carlisle (of South-Central Pennsylvania) is non-union, with the exception of stores in Lewistown and Burnham, Pennsylvania.

While Giant-Carlisle sells products with Giant-Landover branding, and actively uses their branding in stores, they are independent companies.

== Renewable energy projects ==
In June 2020, The Giant Company accomplished its first solar project at the company's corporate headquarters in Carlisle, Pennsylvania, which included a 625kw rooftop solar array. Later that summer, the company added a seven-acre pollinator-friendly solar field at its Carlisle, Pennsylvania headquarters.

Since 2021, The Giant Company has installed a pair of Volta EV charging stations in each of their parking lots.

In November 2021, the Giant Company made a long-term agreement with energy provider Constellation to supply its operations in Pennsylvania for select stores, fuel stations, and distribution centers with renewable energy. According to the report, the company is scheduled to receive 155 million kilowatt-hours of energy per year. As of 2022, the company was at the stage of getting permits and installation and planning to sell excess energy to the grid.

== Sponsorships and charity ==
In 2018, Giant became the official grocer of the Philadelphia Phillies. In October 2019, the company became official partner of the Philadelphia 76ers. In 2018, Giant also entered into a multi-year agreement with the Commonwealth of Pennsylvania and the Pennsylvania Department of Agriculture to become the official sponsor of the Exposition Hall at the Pennsylvania Farm Show Complex & Expo Center in Harrisburg, Pennsylvania. The Giant Company has been engaged in other charity endeavors such as the Please Touch Museum, the Children’s Hospital of Philadelphia and more.

The company also collaborates with the Philadelphia Parks & Recreation Organization to finance sports and recreation projects.

In January 2022, Giant donated $1 million to Pennsylvania's Harrisburg University of Science and Technology to fund its 23,000-square-foot Research and Education Center for Advanced Agriculture and Sustainability.

The grocery chain also has a long-term philanthropic relationship with the Pennsylvania State University and supports the university's various associated projects, including Penn State Health Children's Hospital, the Milton S. Hershey Medical Center and Children's Miracle Network (CMN).

== See also ==
- Genuardi's
- Giant-Landover
