= List of citrus soft drinks =

In addition to PepsiCo's Mountain Dew, Coca-Cola's Mello Yello or Dr Pepper's Sun Drop, there are a variety of smaller or regional brands for citrus soda. Several of these brands include the word "Mountain" in their name to help describe their product, a nod to Mountain Dew's leading market position.

== Citrus Drop/Citrus Drop Xtreme ==
Big K Citrus Drop is the generic version of Mountain Dew sold at Kroger stores. Its name plays another citrus drink, Sun Drop, which claims that its introduction in 1928 makes it the first soft drink marketed in this category, earlier than Mountain Dew. The brand's slogan is "Pop the Drop" which is analogous to Mountain Dew's former "Do the Dew" slogan. Citrus Drop contains 26.2 mg of caffeine per 12 US fl oz (350 ml) can, while Diet Citrus Drop contains 25.1 mg. The Xtreme version tastes the same, but contains more caffeine than the original Citrus Drop, and comes in a 'tribal' themed can. According to Kroger's customer service, Diet Citrus Drop Xtreme has 70.9 mg of caffeine. The slogan is "Citrus With Attitude".

== Citrus Pop ==
This is the Stewart's Shops equivalent to Mountain Dew available in upstate New York and Vermont.

== Fountain Mist ==
This was the Sodastream version of Mountain Dew, sold as a syrup for their home carbonation device. This flavor was sold in standard and diet varieties, both of which use Splenda as part or all of the sweetening agent, instead of aspartame or high-fructose corn syrup. Fountain Mist was discontinued as part of their brand overhaul in mid-2015.

== Hannaford Mountain Lion ==
Hannaford makes Mountain Lion and it has a flavor similar to Mountain Dew but the color is a bit lighter green then Mountain Dew and it costs less it is very similar to Food Lion’s Mountain Lion.

== H-E-B Citrus Rush ==
H-E-B Citrus Rush is distributed by Texas grocery chain H-E-B. H-E-B has compared the soda to Mountain Dew as a part of its “Texas Showdown” campaign.

== Hillbilly Holler ==
Hillbilly Holler is a generic version of Mountain Dew sold at Fareway stores. Rather than being a direct play on the name Mountain Dew, this name and some other generics make reference to the song, Good Old Mountain Dew, which praises the moonshine brewed in the Appalachian Mountains. Hillbilly and Holler are words referring to Appalachian Mountain life. The taste falls somewhere between Mello Yello and Mountain Dew.

== Kickapoo Joy Juice ==
Kickapoo Joy Juice is a citrus-flavored soft drink brand owned by the Monarch Beverage Company. The name was introduced in Li'l Abner, a comic strip that ran from 1934 through 1977.

== Kountry Mist ==
Kountry Mist is the generic version of Mountain Dew sold at Winn-Dixie stores.

== Moon Mist ==
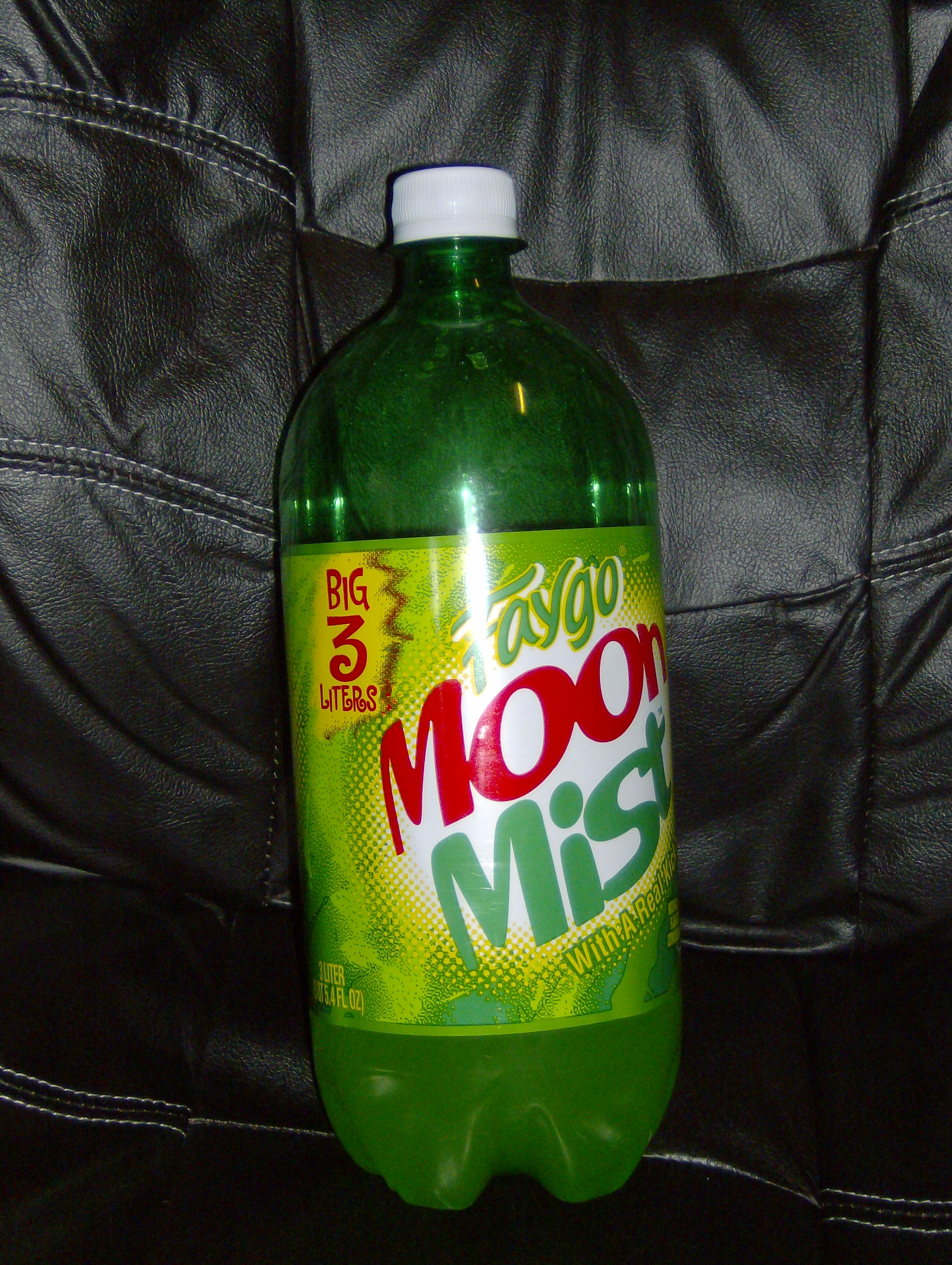
A 3-liter bottle of Faygo Moon Mist

Moon Mist is the Mountain Dew clone sold by Faygo, and is distributed in the Midwest, Mid-Atlantic, and Central Southern regions of the United States.

== Mountain Breeze ==
Mountain Breeze is the Safeway SELECT generic answer to Mountain Dew. The taste of the soda is much the same as Mountain Dew, with a few noticeable differences. Mountain Dew is a bit tangier than its Safeway SELECT counterpart, which focuses more on sweetness. The design of a Mountain Breeze soda can also bears a great resemblance to an older Mountain Dew can, more so than many of the generic citrus sodas. Safeway Select has replaced the brand name with Refreshe.

== Mountain Charge ==
Mountain Charge is the Mountain Dew inspired citrus soda available at ShopRite stores.

== Mt. Chill ==
Mt. Chill is manufactured by SuperValu and can be found at Festival Foods, Sentry Foods, Cub Foods, County Market, Albertsons, and Jewel-Osco. Contains 48g of sugar, 180 calories. The punk band Crucial Dudes has titled a song "Mt. Chill, You're Climbin'" in honor of this product.

== Mountain Drive ==
Mountain Drive is the generic version of Mountain Dew sold at Hy-Vee stores, also available in diet. Formerly known as Heee Haw.

== Mountain Drops ==
The Our Family version of Mountain Dew.

Mountain Drops contains 20 more calories, one more gram of carbohydrates, and one more gram of sugar than Mountain Dew. This generic soda does not use any orange juice.

== Mountain Explosion ==
This is the Clover Valley brand sold at Dollar General.

== Mountain Frost ==
Sold exclusively at Aldi stores.

Similar ingredients. Mountain Frost has the same amount of sugar, which is 47 grams.

== Mountain Fury ==
Mountain Fury is a Mountain Dew taste-alike produced and distributed by the Milwaukee-based Roundy's for their Pick n' Save, Rainbow, Copps and Mariano's stores in Wisconsin, Minnesota and Illinois. Diet Mountain Fury is also available. Mountain Fury has a caffeine content of 41.8 mg per 12 oz. can.

== Mountain Holler ==
Mountain Holler is a generic brand soft drink similar to Mountain Dew and is sold exclusively at Save-A-Lot grocery stores. It has a small group following around the U.S. Its taste is closer to Surge than Mountain Dew.

Mountain Holler also has a few extensions of its flavors, also similar to Mountain Dew. Mountain Holler Red Howl is similar to Code Red or even the limited time Game Fuel, and Mountain Holler Avalanche is similar to Whiteout.

Diet Mountain Holler is also available.

== Mountain Lightning ==
Mountain Lightning is a Wal-Mart soft drink brand that resembles Mountain Dew. On the can, there is a picture of two mountains and lightning bolts surrounding it and the color scheme resembles that of Mountain Dew's. It's a less expensive alternative to Mountain Dew with less caffeine. One can presume that its name was chosen due to both brand names being alternative for moonshine.

== Mountain Lion ==
Mountain Lion is the Food Lion equivalent to Mountain Dew. It is available in cans and PET bottles. Like all Food Lion diet drinks, Diet Mountain Lion is no longer sweetened with Splenda, and they now use aspartame. Mountain Lion tastes very similar to Mountain Dew and Mello Yello. Diet Mountain Lion is sweeter than Diet Mountain Dew. Mountain Lion contains about the same amount of caffeine as Mountain Dew. Mountain Lion can be found at Sweetbay Markets.

Mountain Lion ingredients : carbonated water, high fructose corn syrup, citric acid, orange juice concentrate, natural flavor, potassium benzoate, gum arabic, potassium citrate, caffeine, calcium disodium EDTA, yellow #5, brominated vegetable oil.

== Mountain Mania ==
Mountain Mania is a citrus soda under the President's Choice brand available at Loblaws retailers.

== Mountain Maze ==
Mountain Maze is the Mountain Dew-like soda sold exclusively at Albertsons stores.

== Mountain Mellow ==
Mountain Mellow (a cross between Mountain Dew and Mello Yello) is the Western Family and Shurfine brand Mountain Dew knockoff, sold in some areas with the subtitle "citrus soda." "Mountain Mellow" is sold (under the Western Family banner) in Mega Foods, Lowe's Market in Texas and other stores in the northwest of the U.S.A., and under the Shurfine banner in many areas of the Northeast.

== Mountain Mist, by Top Pop Soda ==
Mountain Mist has made some cameo appearances in Malcolm in the Middle.

== Mountain Moondrops ==
Mountain Moondrops is an Ingles brand of soft drink that resembles Mountain Dew.

== Mountain Rapids ==
Mountain Rapids is the "Smart Sense" brand's Mountain Dew-based soda available at Kmart stores.

== Mountain Roar ==
Mountain Roar is the Harris Teeter equivalent to Mountain Dew. This soda is similar to Mountain Dew in taste, but it has a higher sugar content. Mountain Roar is no longer available at most Harris Teeters, but Diet Mountain Roar can be found at times.

== Mountain Rush ==
Mountain Rush is manufactured by Shasta and designed to compete with Mountain Dew and Mello Yello.

== Mountain Shoutin ==
Mountain Shoutin is a Stop & Shop/Giant-Landover soft drink brand designed to compete with Mountain Dew.

== Mountain Shower ==
Mountain Shower is the Weis Markets version of a Mountain Dew-type soda.

== Mountain Splash ==
Mountain Splash is the Publix Super Markets brand of generic Mountain Dew. Formerly known as Citrus Hit.

== Mountain Summit ==
Mountain Summit is the Schnucks store brand of Mountain Dew.

== Mountain Tops ==
Mountain Tops is the Tops Friendly Markets store brand of Mountain Dew.

== Mountain W ==
Mountain W is the Wegmans stores version of a Mountain Dew style soda.

== Mountain Wave ==
Mountain Wave is the generic "Nice!" soda brand's version of Mountain Dew available at Walgreens stores.

== Mountain Yeller ==
Mountain Yeller is the Piggly Wiggly version of a Mountain Dew style soda. It is also where the South Carolina/Florida folk band The Mountain Yellers got their name.

== Ramp ==
Ramp is a Giant-Landover soft drink brand designed to compete with Mountain Dew.

== Rocky Mist ==
Rocky Mist is a Meijer soft drink brand that also resembles Mountain Dew.

== Stratford Sodas Citrus ==
Stratford Sodas citrus is a small regional citrus soft drink from the United Kingdom made specifically for rum, only available in the UK.

== Ski ==
Ski is a citrus soda made from orange and lemon juices manufactured by the Double Cola Company. The Double Cola Company of Chattanooga, Tennessee originally got the formulated Ski from Byron Clarson in 1956 who owned a Double Cola-related bottling company in Richland Center, Wisconsin, and trademarked the soda in 1958.

== See also ==
- List of lemon-lime soda brands
