= 2019 Stop & Shop strike =

Labor action in New England

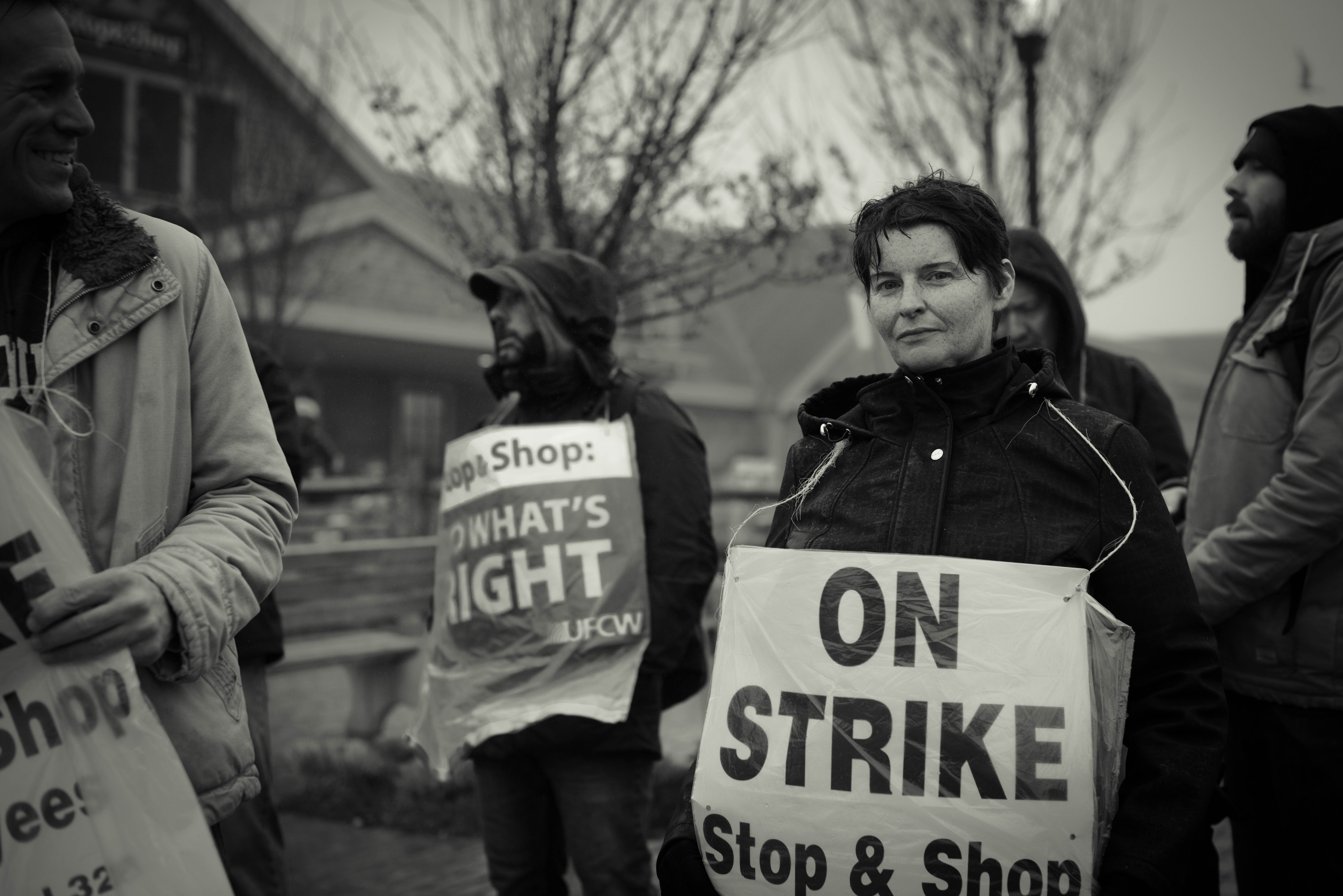
- Workers on strike in Nantucket, Massachusetts
- Date: April 11 – April 21, 2019
- Location: New England (Massachusetts, Rhode Island, and Connecticut)
- Caused by: Decreased pay and employee benefits
- Methods: Strikes, Demonstrations

Parties
United Food and Commercial Workers	Stop & Shop

Number
~31,000	

The 2019 Stop & Shop strike began on April 11, 2019, when approximately 31,000 workers, represented by United Food and Commercial Workers, walked off the job and began picketing Stop & Shop locations across New England, in the U.S. states of Massachusetts, Rhode Island, and Connecticut. The strike was in response to the company not agreeing after extensive negotiations to a contract which did not reduce employee pay and benefits. The strike ended ten days later on April 21.

== Background ==
The 2016 collective bargaining agreement between Stop & Shop and its union staff expired on February 23, 2019, at midnight. In an effort to reach a memorandum of understanding before the contract's expiration date, the five local chapters of the United Food and Commercial Workers International Union (UFCW) that represents 31,000 of Stop and Shop's employees in 249 stores began negotiating a new contract on January 14, 2019. Negotiations throughout the remainder of January were promising, with the local chapters working out "wording" technicalities with the company. However, progress was effectively halted in early-to-mid February after Stop & Shop presented their monetary and payroll requirements for the upcoming agreement's term.

The company's proposed contract sought to eliminate for many employees premium pay on national holidays and Sundays, while also eliminating any raises, reducing contributions to pensions, and increasing healthcare costs. Negotiations continued in good faith between the two sides, but with no progress made, UFCW Local 1445 of Massachusetts became the first chapter to authorize a strike if needed on February 24. In the following weeks, the members of the four other UFCW unions in Massachusetts, Connecticut, and Rhode Island also authorized a potential strike as a response to the lack of progress. The strike did not occur, and negotiations continued sporadically through the first week of April. On April 3, federal mediators were brought in after the unions rejected Stop & Shop's "last offer" contract. An unsuccessful round of negotiations overseen by the federal negotiators broke down on April 10. On the same day, shareholders of Ahold Delhaize, the owner of the grocery chain, voted to increase the company's dividend by 11.1% in comparison to the last year. The next day a strike was called.

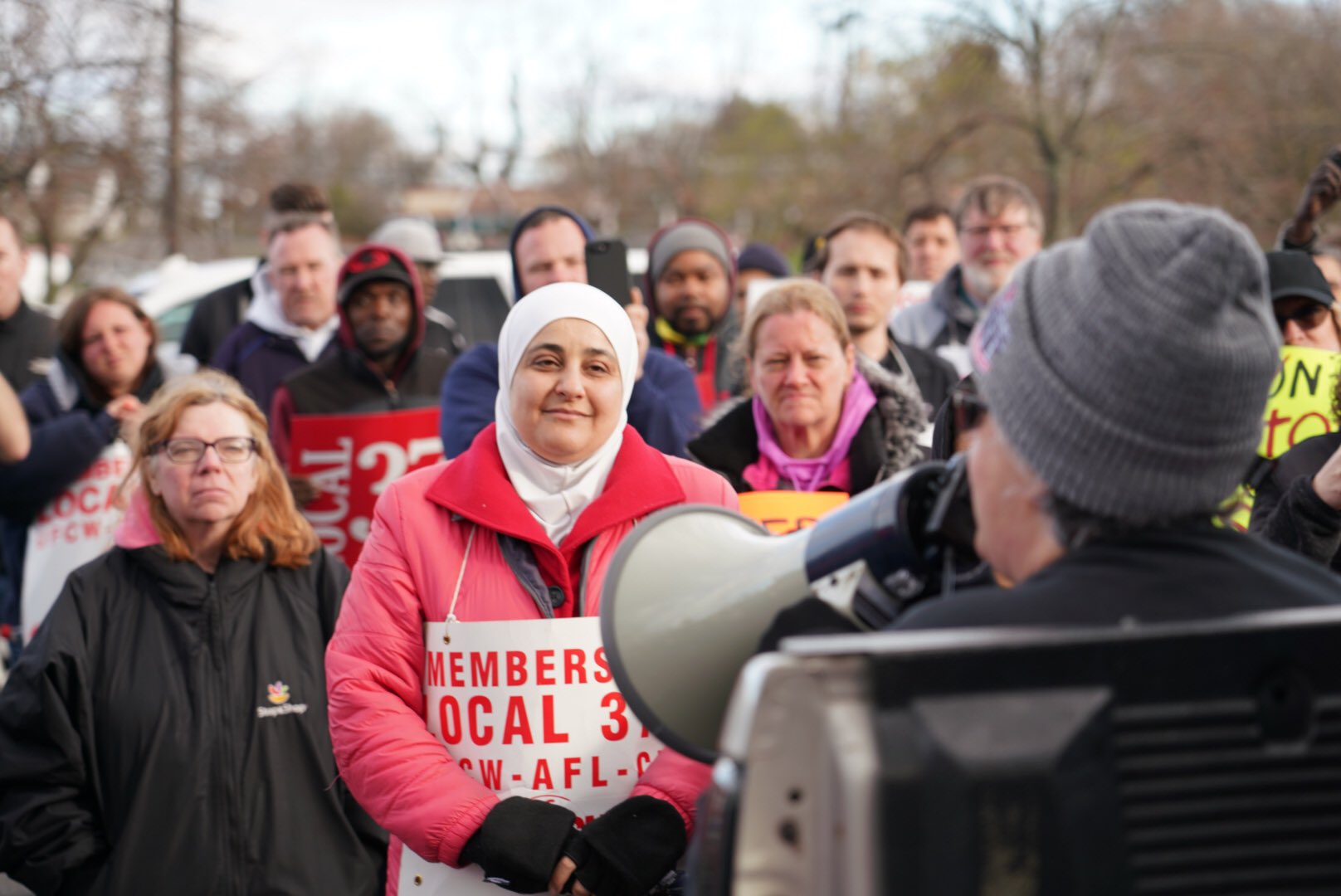
Worker during the Stop & Shop strike.

== Strike ==
Union Stop & Shop employees walked off the job at 1:00 p.m. on April 11 to strike against the contract proposed by Stop & Shop. The next day the teamster union, which represented the store's delivery truck drivers and warehouse workers, told its members to respect the UFCW's picket line. On April 15, Hockey Hall of Fame defenseman Ray Bourque crossed the picket line at the Stop & Shop in North Andover, Massachusetts; after being filmed by picketing workers, he quickly issued an apology for doing so. On April 17, The Boston Globe reported that "at least several dozen" Stop & Shop locations were closed due to the strike. During the first week of the strike, foot traffic by loyal customers in the remaining stores decreased by 75 percent compared to the prior week. The Connecticut Food Bank during the same week coordinated with the stores and union representatives to ensure that the food at the nearly empty locations did not go to waste while maintaining safety and respect. It was estimated that each day of the strike the company lost $20 million in revenue. The managing director of the retail consulting firm Strategic Resource Group said, "In nearly 30 years, we haven't seen a strike as effective and devastating as this one."

Candidates for the 2020 Democratic presidential nomination, including Bernie Sanders, the junior senator from Vermont, and former Vice President Joe Biden announced support for Stop & Shop's employees' strike. Elizabeth Warren, the senior senator from Massachusetts, who was also a candidate for the nomination, joined workers at the Somerville, Massachusetts, location to rally for a new contract and brought doughnuts for the striking workers. Democratic candidates, South Bend, Indiana, mayor Pete Buttigieg and senator Amy Klobuchar of Minnesota, as well as local politicians, also visited the picket lines over the next few days in support of the striking workers.

The Stop & Shop strike ended on April 21, 2019, after the company and the striking workers reached a tentative agreement, which preserved health and pension benefits and raised employee pay. The 11-day strike cost the company $224 million in lost sales and $90–100 million in lost profits. The tentative agreement was viewed by the union as a "powerful victory".

In August 2019, Ahold Delhaize reported the 11-day strike resulted in a $345 million loss in sales, with an estimated 1 in 10 customers not coming back to the store as a regular customer after the strike.

== See also ==
- Southern California supermarket strike of 2003–2004
- Market Basket protests of 2014
