= Mountain breeze =

Mountain breeze may refer to:

- Mountain breeze and valley breeze, a localized pair of winds
- Mountain Breeze, a generic store-brand citrus soda
