= Rabinovitz/Rabb family =

American Jewish family

The Rabinovitz/Rabb family is an American Jewish family engaged in business and philanthropy who built the Stop & Shop supermarket chain in the Boston area.

== First Generation ==
In 1891, Nachman Schleime and Yente Rabinovitz immigrated to the United States with their children from Malestovka, Russia. They settled in Boston, where Yente ran a grocery store in Boston's North End.

== The Rabinovitz Brothers ==
The eldest brother, Joseph Rabinovitz, and his brother Max founded the Standard Grocery Company (known as "Ecco") in 1898. Their brothers Jacob (1885-1967) and Julius founded the Economy Grocery Stores in 1914. Joseph soon sold his share in Standard and invested in Ecco.

== The Rabbs ==
Joseph and his wife Charlotte (Lottie) Wolf had four children: Sidney R. Rabb (1900-1985), Norman S. Rabb (1905-1997), Jeanette Rabb Solomon (Mrs. Sidney), and Irving William Rabb (1913-2011). The three brothers and one sister all attended Boston Latin School and Girls Latin School and Harvard University and joined Ecco. The three changed their last name to Rabb in 1946, the year the Economy Grocery Company was renamed Stop & Shop.

Sidney, the eldest, was the first to join Ecco at the age of 18. In 1920 he became co-owner with his father and uncle Joseph and Jacob. Sidney became chairman of the board and chief executive officer in 1930, a position he retained until his death in 1985.

Norman graduated from Harvard and joined Ecco in 1925, the year the company went public. He rose to the position of vice chairman and then senior vice president of Stop & Shop. Norman was youngest of the seven founders of Brandeis University in 1948. He served as the first secretary of the board, and was chairman of the board from 1961 to 1967.

Irving graduated from Boston Latin in 1930 and from Harvard College in 1934, attended Harvard Business School, then joined Ecco in 1935, the year it opened Boston's first supermarket. He rose to become president and then vice chairman of Stop & Shop. He became a trustee of Beth Israel Hospital in 1956, was president of the board from 1967 to 1970, and later served as chairman of the board. Irving, like his brothers, also served as a trustee and board member of several other Boston Jewish, arts, and medical institutions, including the Boston Symphony Orchestra, the Museum of Fine Arts, Boston, the Cambridge Community Foundation, the Dana Farber Cancer Institute, Hebrew College, Hebrew SeniorLife, the New England Conservatory of Music, and Temple Israel of Boston.

== Third Generation ==
Sidney Rabb married Esther Cohn and had two daughters, Helene and Carol R. Carol, born in 1931, attended Tufts University and Harvard Business School before joining Stop & Shop in 1985. She married a fellow Stop & Shop employee, Avram J. Goldberg. Avram, born in 1930, became executive vice president, then president of the company in 1971 and chairman of the board when his father-in-law Sidney died in 1985. Carol, then executive vice president, became president of the company. They were forced to resign from Stop & Shop soon after the company was sold to Kohlberg Kravis Roberts & Co in 1988 in a hostile takeover. Helene Rabb married Norman Cahners from Maine who founded The Cahners Publishing Company. Helene and Norman had three children, Robert, Andrew and Nancy.

Norman Rabb married Eleanor Epstein and had two daughters, Hope (born 1935) and Jane (b.1938).

Irving Rabb married Charlotte "Dolly" Frank and had two children, Betty Ann and James.

Betty Ann Schafer née Rabb graduated from Radcliffe College and married Jack Grier Schafer in 1964. A resident of San Francisco, Betty Shafer is a trustee of Earthjustice, Brandeis Hillel Day School, The Coro Center for Civic Leadership, and SEO Scholars.

James Rabb became a gastroenterologist at Beth Israel. Dr. Rabb is an overseer of the Boston Symphony Orchestra, the School of Nutrition Science and Policy at Tufts University and on the board of directors of Jewish Family and Children's Service. He married Melinda Alliker Rabb, who became an English professor at Brown University, and is a trustee of WGBH and on the Board of Directors at Celebrity Series of Boston.

In 2013, the Jewish Family and Children's Service, Greater Boston Food Bank and Project Bread, with support from Betty and Jack Schafer and James and Melinda Rabb, launched the Greater Boston Hunger Network.

== Fourth Generation ==
Carol and Avram Goldberg had two children, Deborah Goldberg and Joshua Goldberg. Deborah married Michael Winter in 1987 and have two children, Evan and Meredith.
