= Ukrop's Food Group =

American retail company

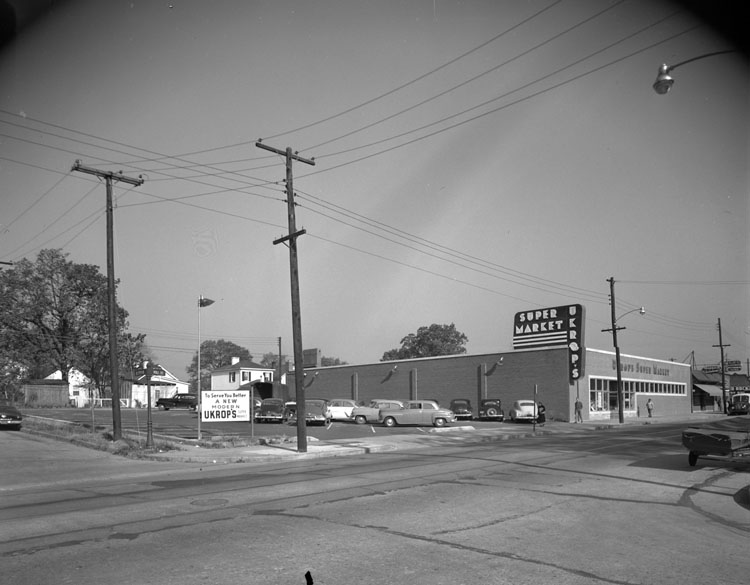
- A Ukrop's Super Market in 1953
- Type: Family business
- Industry: Retail
- Founded: 1976
- Headquarters: Richmond, Virginia, United States
- Products: Food company
- Number of employees: 5,000
- Website: www.ukropshomestylefoods.com

Ukrop's is an American company that operates a central bakery and kitchen producing baked goods and prepared meals. Its baked goods are marketed under the Good Meadow and Ukrop's brands. In 1976 Ukrop's bought Dot's Pastry Shop, a well-known bakery in Richmond. It used the name Dot's Pastry Shop for years before changing it to Ukrop's Bakery.

From 1937 to 2010 the Ukrop family operated supermarkets in Richmond and its surrounding area under the corporate name Ukrop's Super Markets, but the family sold its retail grocery operations to Giant-Carlisle, a subsidiary of Netherlands-based Ahold. The name was changed to Martin's.

== History ==
Ukrop's Super Markets was founded in 1937 by Joseph Ukrop. The company had 26 stores, mostly in the Richmond area, as well as one store in Williamsburg, and one each in Colonial Heights, Petersburg, and Fredericksburg. An additional Williamsburg location and a Roanoke location closed during 2009 due to low sales and limited brand recognition in those cities. Ukrop's also operated a specialty store in Richmond called Joe's Market, named after the founder. The company chairman is James Ukrop, son of Joseph; James' brother Robert is president and chief executive officer.

Ukrop's stores were closed on Sundays and did not sell alcohol, limiting the stores' sources of revenue compared to other retail supermarkets. Nevertheless, the store held a dominant sales share in the Richmond area and was a cultural touchstone for generations of local residents, most notably in their reputation for customer service, baked goods, and prepared foods.

=== Sale of Ukrop's ===
On December 17, 2009, Ukrop's announced that the Giant-Carlisle Division of the Dutch-based conglomerate Ahold would acquire all twenty-five of Ukrop's stores for $140 Million. This marked the end of the Ukrop family's retail venture. The sale was finalized on February 8, 2010. The transition away from the use of the Ukrop's store name to Giant-Carlisle's Martin's brand took place in the spring of 2010. However, certain baked goods are still produced by Ukrop's Bakery division and labeled as such. The transaction did not include the Ukrop's store in Fredericksburg, which closed. The lone Joe's Market store owned by the chain was sold to two former Ukrop's employees, who reopened it as Libbie Market.

As of September 30, 2009, the company's assets were listed as $233 million, with liabilities of $145.9 million.
