= Southern California supermarket strike of 2003–2004 =

Labor dispute in California, United States

The Southern California supermarket strike of 2003–2004 was a strike by the United Food and Commercial Workers union (UFCW) against four supermarket chains in Southern California. Management and the unions arrived at a contract after twenty weeks, with both sides claiming victory.

== Overview ==
On the labor side, the primary party was the United Food and Commercial Workers union (UFCW), although deli workers were represented by UNITE HERE and also struck. On the management side, it involved the supermarket chain companies Albertsons (then an independent company), Ralphs (owned by Kroger) and Vons (owned by Safeway). Vons was the negotiating employer.

== Causes ==
The strike was instigated when management tried to lower labor costs by reducing healthcare and other benefits, to compete with non-unionized Walmart superstores.

== Impact ==
For over four months, 70,000 union workers throughout Southern California stood outside of stores, and along streets to picket and protest the corporations. Workers of Vons struck, and as a mutual consequence, Ralphs and Albertsons workers were locked out. Many workers camped out in front of stores. As the UFCW appealed for community support, many customers began to support the cause by honoring a boycott of the 900 stores on strike. But the wildfires of 2003 effectively broke the boycott. As the situation deteriorated over the week people stocked up on every available provision. The stores were stripped bare. The boycott never gained traction again after.

Despite the heavy economic losses in the region, the grocers saw the dispute as an investment to bring their costs in line with non-union competitors. Grocery chains used to be largely regional, but with consolidation had turned national and could afford losses in one area. Indeed, during the course of the dispute, UFCW members remained working under contract with the same employers in other areas of the country.

=== Felony charges admitted by Ralphs Grocery Co. ===
Kroger Co. owned Ralphs Grocery Co. supermarkets grocery chain, pleaded guilty to hiring replacement workers during the 2003-2004 Southern California grocery strike. Federal District Court assessed Ralphs a $70 Million penalty: $20 Million as a fine, and $50 Million as restitution to reimburse striking workers and their union. It was discovered and subsequently investigated that Ralphs encouraged and used fake social security numbers and fake workers' names in hiring these strike replacement workers, some of whom were striking workers then relocated to remote Ralphs locations. Several months prior, on January 29, 2006, Ralphs had first pleaded not guilty to charges of hiring violations.

== Two-tier settlement ==
On February 26, 2004, union members voted 86% to ratify an agreement with a two-tier system. Both sides claimed victory:

The trade unions won the following conditions for current employees:

- Affordable health care benefits for new and current workers with no weekly employee premiums in the first two years, and only nominal payments if needed, in the third year.
- Employer contributions of nearly $190 million to rebuild the health plan reserves.
- A combined pension fund for new hires and current employees.
- A wage payment averaging about $500 in the first and third years of the contract (UFCW.org)".

The employers won the following conditions for future employees they hire:

- Lower base salaries.
- Changed rate of pay for Sunday work from time and a half to time plus one dollar.
- Longer work period required before earning benefits.
- Lower Holiday Pay
- No Personal Days
- Longer wait to accumulate vacations.
