= Genuardi's =

Former chain of supermarkets in the northeastern U.S.

Genuardi's Family Markets
- Formerly: Genuardi Supermarkets and Genuardi's Supermarkets
- Type: Private
- Industry: Grocer
- Founded: 1954
- Founder: Gaspare Genuardi
- Defunct: 2012 (as a chain); 2015 (all locations)
- Fate: Acquired by Safeway in 2000; Supermarkets sold to other owners between 2011 and 2015
- Headquarters: Norristown, Pennsylvania, U.S.
- Number of locations: Delaware, New Jersey, and Pennsylvania, U.S.
- Area served: Southeast Pennsylvania
- Key people: Gaspare, Josephine, Charlie, Frank, Joe, Tom and Jim Genuardi
- Products: Bakery, dairy, deli, floral, frozen foods, general grocery, meat, produce, seafood, and snacks.
- Number of employees: 7,000
- Parent: Safeway
- Website: https://genuardifamilyfoundation.org/

Genuardi's Family Markets (GFM) was a chain of supermarkets located in the Northeastern United States. A family-owned chain, Genuardi's Family Markets spanned three states, employed 7,000 people, ran 39 locations, and served more than 1 million households. Its slogan—originally "The Difference is Our Family Pride," which evolved into "Family Pride Makes the Difference"—was a guiding principle in Genuardi's operations and internal culture. Its headquarters was in Norristown, Pennsylvania. In 2001, Safeway purchased the chain.

== History ==
=== Early years ===
Gaspare Genuardi arrived in the United States in 1904, leaving behind his hometown of Sciacca, Sicily, for a new life in Norristown, Pennsylvania.

In Norristown, Gaspare met Josephine Sclafani, who had also immigrated from Sciacca. They married in 1907, and together they raised three daughters (Pauline, Anna, and Rose) and six sons (Charles (Charlie), Frank, Joseph (Joe), Dominic (Tom), Vincent (Jim), and Salvatore (Sal)).

Between 1905 and 1920, Gaspare was employed by Alan Wood Steel, and was a scrap dealer with his own horse and wagon. He began farming on 15 acres of leased land in Norristown, initially selling fresh fruits and vegetables from a stand at the Norristown Farmers Market and door to door on a horse-drawn wagon. By 1939, the business had grown to include truck delivery services operated with the help of Gaspare’s sons Charlie, Frank, Joe, and Tom.

In the 1930s, the Genuardi family expanded their business, opening their first “mom-and-pop” storefront at their residence on Sandy Street and, in 1940, leasing a store in Jeffersonville for $35 a month, establishing what would become the first Genuardi’s “Superette.”

Business growth continued throughout the 1940s and early 1950s, prompting the need for a more extensive business strategy. Jim later joined Charlie, Frank, Joe, and Tom in managing the stores, and together the five became known collectively as the Genuardi Brothers. In 1952, the Genuardi Brothers purchased 6.5 acres of land, which became their first supermarket in 1954. On their Jeffersonville supermarket’s opening day, they welcomed customers and the community into their 7,200-square-foot self-service grocery store. This expansion represented a significant milestone for the business that their father Gaspare had started.

=== Founding ===
Genuardi’s grew slowly at first, adding stores in 1958, 1961, and 1965. The market put its customers at the forefront of its business model in pursuit of quality products and services. As the business expanded more aggressively throughout the 1970s and 1980s, it added eight new stores in the 1970s and established Norristown Beef Company, a meat, dairy, and frozen food wholesaler, and Gen-Oaks, a grocery warehouse. In the 1980s, Genuardi’s added another eight new stores and established five Mad Grocers, a chain of discount limited assortment grocery stores. Throughout its expansion, Genuardi’s continually innovated toward customer convenience, aiming for extraordinary value tied to personalized services.

In October 1990, having just opened their 24th establishment under the Genuardi’s Family Markets name and five Mad Grocers, the five Genuardi Brothers transferred ownership of the stores to the third generation of the family, which consisted of Charles, Skip, Tom Jr., Larry, Anthony, Joe Jr., David, Michael, and Jim (the Genuardi Cousins).

Over the next decade, the business experienced its most aggressive growth, opening 20 new Genuardi’s Family Markets and acquiring Zagara’s Specialty Market to elevate its organic and prepared food program. This expansion included the addition of three more specialty stores. It also closed four Genuardi’s locations, the Mad Grocers chain, Gen-Oaks, and the Norristown Beef Company. Additionally, it undertook major remodeling in 10 stores. By the end of the decade, Genuardi’s had nearly quadrupled its business.

In 2001, the third generation of Genuardi’s Family Markets owners made the strategic decision to sell their grocery business to Safeway. The decision came about through a mutual family agreement to exit on their own terms. The Genuardi family ran their business the same way they sold it, with “Family Pride” and with their community close to their hearts.

=== Operations ===
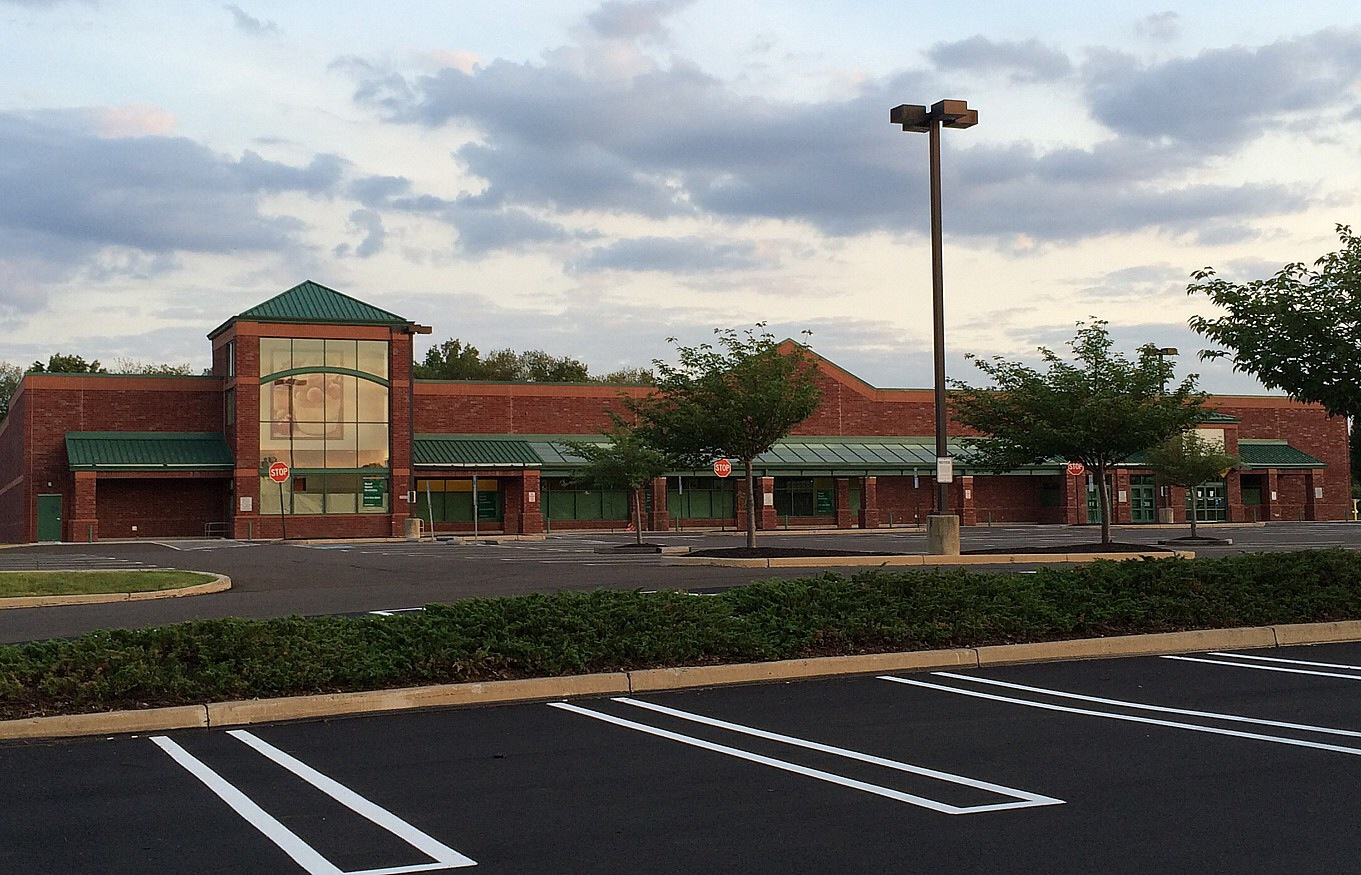
A former Genuardis store in Warrington, Pennsylvania

Genuardi’s Family Markets was one of the top supermarket retailers in the Delaware Valley, employing 7,000 people in three states. With more than 39 locations, the reach of Genuardi’s Family Markets was expansive.

Genuardi’s Family Markets considered its employees an important extension of the business, affectionately referring to them as a family. The Genuardi's cultivated a workplace hinged on their core philosophy, “Family Pride,” and their commitment to their community, offering competitive pay and benefits and other resources to their employees. Their “Family Pride” philosophy encapsulated their core values: honesty, hard work, and service to the community.

The business’ emphasis on “Family Pride” was exemplified by the Genuardi Family Chatter, a small internal publication that proved to be a connective tool for the business, offering an outlet to discuss ideas with employees and to convey the company’s appreciation for them. From the very beginning, the company held annual picnics for all employees and their families to attend where food and games brought everyone together.

Store Locations (1954–2001)
| Store # | City | State | Opened | Closed |
| 1 | Jeffersonville | PA | 1954 | |
| 2 | Sandy Hill (Norristown) | PA | 1958 | |
| 3 | Swede Square | PA | 1961 | |
|---|---|---|---|---|
| | East Norriton (#3 relocated) | PA | 1999 | |
| 4 | Audubon | PA | 1965 | |
| 5 | Maple Glen | PA | 1969 | |
| 6 | Yeadon | PA | 1969 | 1972 |
| 7 | Warminster | PA | 1975 | 1993 |
| 8 | King of Prussia | PA | 1972 | 2000 |
| | King of Prussia (#8 relocated) | PA | 2001 | |
| 9 | Eagleville | PA | 1973 | |
| 10 | Quakertown | PA | 1974 | 1989 |
| 11 | Markley Street (Norristown) | PA | 1975 | 1985 |
| 12 | West Point | PA | 1976 | |
| 13 | Flourtown | PA | 1978 | |
| 14 | Spring City | PA | 1979 | 1996 |
| 15 | Rockledge | PA | 1979 | |
| | Rockledge (#15 relocated) | PA | 1995 | |
| 16 | Chesterbrook | PA | 1981 | |
| 17 | Royersford | PA | 1983 | |
| | Royersford (#17 relocated) | PA | 1996 | |
| 18 | Neshaminy (Bensalem) | PA | 1983 | 1998 |
| 19 | Exton | PA | 1985 | 1991 |
| 20 | East Goshen | PA | 1988 | |
| 21 | Newton | PA | 1988 | |
| 22 | Doylestown | PA | 1988 | |
| 23 | New Britain | PA | 1989 | |
| 24 | Glen Eagle (Concord Twp) | PA | 1990 | |
| 25 | Towamencin | PA | 1990 | |
| 26 | Pottstown | PA | 1991 | |
| 27 | Kimberton | PA | 1992 | |
| 28 | St. Davids | PA | 1992 | |
| 29 | Edgemont | PA | 1995 | |
| 30 | Springfield | PA | 1996 | |
| 31 | Glasgow | DE | 1995 | 1997 |
| | Glasgow (#30 relocated) | DE | 1997 | |
| 32 | Bear | DE | 1995 | |
| 33 | Langhorne | PA | 1997 | |
| 34 | Willow Ridge (Evesham Twp) | NJ | 1998 | |
| 35 | Feasterville | PA | 1998 | |
| 36 | Roslyn | PA | 1998 | |
| 37 | Spring House | PA | 1999 | |
| 38 | Warwick | PA | 1999 | |
| 39 | Wynnwood | PA | 1999 | |
| 40 | Bensalem | PA | 1999 | |
| 41 | Brandywine | DE | 1999 | |
| 42 | Barnegat | NJ | 1999 | |
| 43 | Lionville | PA | 2000 | |
| 44 | East Marlborough | PA | 2000 | |

Opened By Safeway After Sale
| Store # | City | State | Opened | Closed |
|---|---|---|---|---|
| 45 | Hamilton | NJ | | |
| 46 | Northfield (Egg Harbor) | NJ | | |
| 47 | East Windsor | NJ | | |
| 48 | Hershey's Mill | | | |
| 49 | Warrington | PA | | |

Zagara's
| Store # | City | State | Opened | Closed |
|---|---|---|---|---|
| Z1 | Marlton | NJ | 1997 | |
| Z2 | Mt. Laurel | NJ | 1999 | |
| Z3 | Jenkintown | PA | 2000 | |
| Z4 | Brinton Lake | PA | 2001 | |
| Sunset Baking Co. | Mt. Laurel | NJ | | |

Warehouses
| Store # | City | State | Opened | Closed |
|---|---|---|---|---|
| NBC | Norristown | PA | 1967 | 1973 |
| NBC | East Norriton | PA | 1973 | 1986 |
| | Hatfield | PA | 1986 | 1996 |
| Gen Oaks | Oaks | PA | 1976 | 1996 |

==== Subsidiaries/Acquisitions ====
NBC Wholesale Foods (Norristown Beef Co.), 1967

Gen-Oaks (grocery warehouse), 1976

Mad Grocers, 1980

Zagara’s Specialty Food, 1997

=== Products and services ===
Genuardi’s Family Markets, while maintaining its foundation in fresh produce and meats, expanded its operations to include in-store bakeries, service meat departments, and a private-label product line. The company was an early adopter of innovations such as frozen vegetables and pre-packaged, self-serve meat products, positioning itself as a pioneer in modern grocery retailing.

Over the course of its operation, Genuardi’s opened and ran NBC Wholesale Foods (1968–1996), which distributed meat, dairy, and frozen food items to the stores and to local restaurants. Additionally, it ran Gen-Oaks (1976–1996), a grocery warehouse to purchase items in bulk to help Genuardi’s Family Markets compete with other chains. Genuardi’s innovations also included Family Fair, a venture into hardware stores with two locations, and five Mad Grocers (1980–1996), a discount limited assortment grocery chain with five stores.

=== Community Impact and Awards ===
Genuardi’s Family Markets was known for its Community Cash Back Program, an initiative that donated 1% of tape value receipts collected by customers to more than 3,500 nonprofits in the community. Between 1976 and 2000, the Community Cash Back Program donated $20 million through the program. Alongside the cash-back initiative, Genuardi’s Family Markets sponsored high school sports awards, a scholarship program for employees, and the Philadelphia Food Bank. Its community impact was widely recognized, and it received numerous awards, including the “C” Flag from President Ronald Reagan for its Community Cash Back Program in 1986, the Wharton School of Business Family Business of the Year Award in 1999, and the Purple Aster Award for Family from the Order of Sons of Italy in America in 2000.

Genuardi’s Family Markets instituted additional programs in support of its communities across its stores, including NutriALERT, which offered shoppers factual nutritional information; Words Worth Eating, a recipe program; and the Tour Our Store Program, which offered youth the chance to see inside the supermarkets.

=== Safeway ===
In February 2001, the Genuardi cousins sold the chain to Safeway. After the acquisition, Safeway introduced operational changes including different product selections, the addition of private-label brands, and the use of a loyalty card program. Some stores were rebranded under the Safeway name, while others continued to operate as Genuardi’s.

In September 2011, Safeway sought to sell all or part of Genuardi’s. Later that month, a sale of several of Genuardi’s locations to Giant-Carlisle appeared to be imminent.

On January 5, 2012, Giant-Carlisle announced its deal to acquire 16 Genuardi’s Family Markets across the greater Philadelphia suburban area. The Audubon location, the last remaining store, closed on May 27, 2015.

=== Genuardi Family Foundation ===
In continuation of the Genuardi family legacy, the Genuardi Family Foundation was established at the time of the supermarket chain’s sale to Safeway in 2001. The Genuardi Family Foundation was founded by nine third-generation family members to give back to the same communities in the Delaware Valley that supported Genuardi’s Family Markets. Following in their tradition of leadership, several fourth-generation family members joined the board, whose members remain invested in the Foundation’s mission “to support the development of healthy individuals, families, and community by promoting self-sufficiency, hard work, and generosity with a commitment to caring for the most vulnerable in our communities.” The Foundation supports nonprofit organizations by funding access to basic services and resources in the community that address food access, housing, and job placement in the hope of breaking cycles of poverty in Southeastern Pennsylvania.

== Sources ==
- Genuardi Family Markets Employee Handbook, 1995.
