= Stop & Shop =

American regional supermarket chain

The Stop & Shop Supermarket Company, LLC.

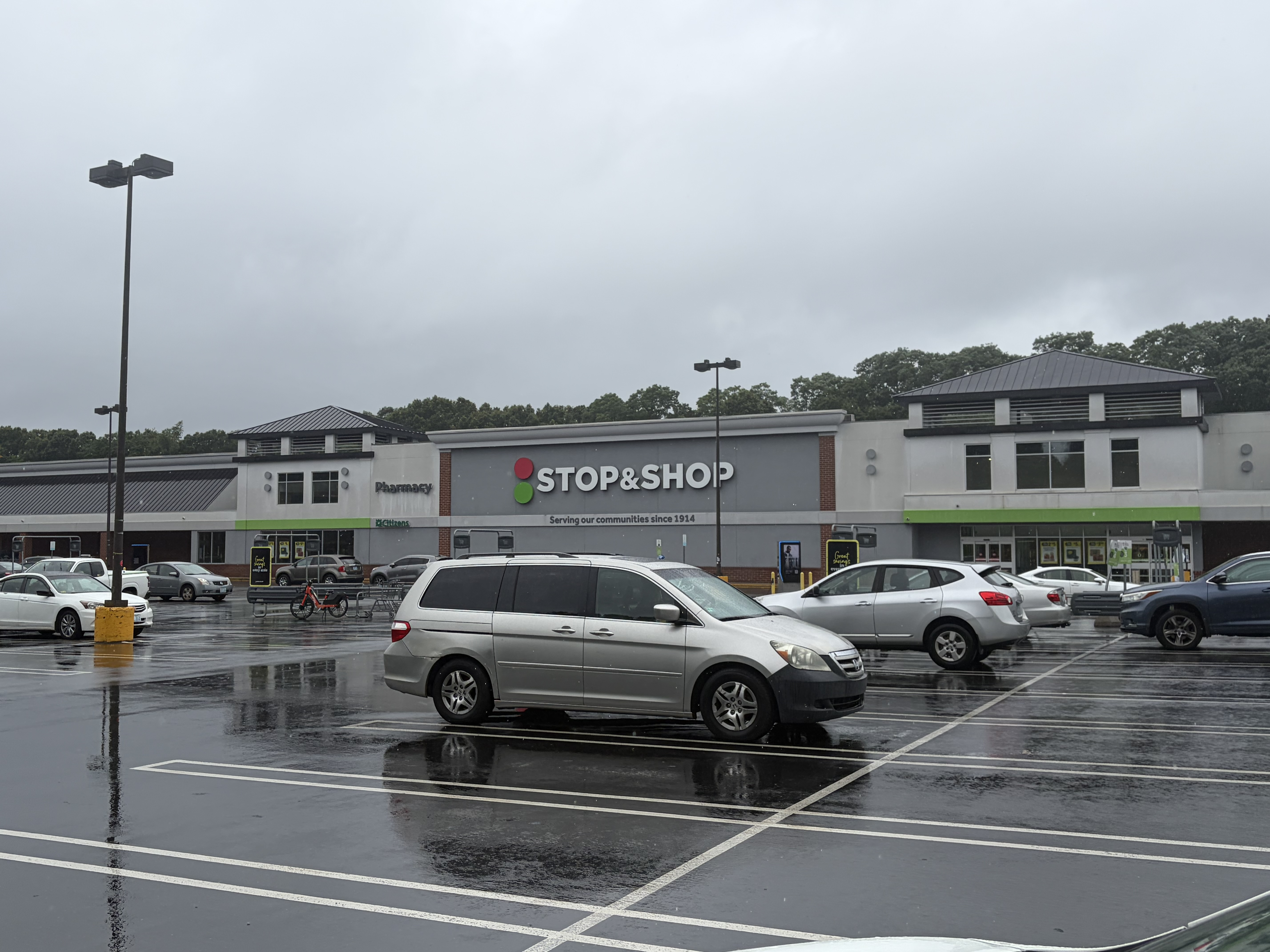
- Stop & Shop store in North Providence, Rhode Island
- Trade name: Stop & Shop
- Formerly: Economy Grocery Stores Company (1914–1946)
- Type: Subsidiary of Ahold Delhaize
- Industry: Retail
- Predecessor: Greenie Store (1892–1908)
- Founded: 1914 (112 years ago) in Somerville, Massachusetts, United States
- Founder: The Rabinovitz/Rabb family
- Headquarters: Quincy, Massachusetts, United States
- Number of locations: 365 stores (2025)
- Areas served: Southern New England; Downstate New York; Northern New Jersey
- Products: Bakery; Grocery; Florist; Deli; Gelatin Shop; Produce; Seafood; Meats; Dairy; Pharmacy; General Merchandise; Gasoline
- Revenue: ▲US$15.2 billion 3.25% (2015)
- Number of employees: 82,000+
- Parent: Ahold Delhaize
- Website: stopandshop.com

The former logo, used up to 2008.

The logo used from August 22, 2008 to October 3, 2018 and shared with sibling chain Giant of Landover; still found in some stores and used on private label products

The Stop & Shop Supermarket Company, known as Stop & Shop, is an American regional chain of supermarkets located in the northeastern United States. From its beginnings in 1892 as a small grocery store, it has grown to include a 365-store chain.

Stop & Shop has been a wholly owned subsidiary of the Dutch supermarket operator Ahold since 1995 and was part of the Stop & Shop/Giant-Landover division with sister chain Giant-Landover between 2004 and 2011. Ahold announced on June 24, 2015, that it would merge with Brussels-based Delhaize Group, a Belgian grocery store conglomerate whose U.S. grocery operations included Hannaford of Scarborough, Maine and Food Lion of Salisbury, North Carolina. The merger was completed on July 24, 2016, with the new holding company being named Ahold Delhaize, and it is now a sister company to the formerly competing New England supermarket chain Hannaford, along with Food Lion.

== History ==
=== Beginning ===
Stop & Shop's roots can be traced back to 1892, when Solomon and Jeanie Rabinowitz opened a grocery shop, called the Greenie Store, at 134 Salem Street, in the North End of Boston, Massachusetts. This store operated at this location until 1908. According to the company's web site, Stop & Shop was founded in 1914 in Somerville, Massachusetts, by the Rabinowitz family as the Economy Grocery Stores Company. Four years later, the store adopted the new self-service supermarket model recently pioneered by Piggly Wiggly. A second store opened later in 1914, several stores opened a year later and by 1917, the chain had 15 stores. Initially, the stores sold only grocery items, but soon after added meats, produce, milk, dairy, and some frozen foods. Like A & P, they were pioneers of the modern grocery store, selling all types of food items under one roof. Stores were 10,000 to 15,000 square feet (930 to 1,390 m^{2}) and in downtown and inner city areas in the Boston and Springfield metro areas. The chain had grown to 86 supermarkets by 1946, when the name was changed to Stop & Shop, Inc.

=== Pre-1980s ===
In 1959, Stop & Shop had 100 stores by opening in Natick, Massachusetts. In 1961, Stop & Shop bought the now-defunct department store chain Bradlees, based in Connecticut. Later, in the 60s, they bought the three-store chain ORBIT'S stores and merged them into Bradlees. Stop & Shop stores in Massachusetts were opening in suburban areas and in shopping plazas. In the early 1950s, Stop & Shop entered Connecticut and Rhode Island, in the early 1960s in New York, and in the late 1960s in New Jersey. With Bradlees in the company, Stop & Shop began offering non-food items in their supermarkets. In many areas, Stop & Shop and Bradlees were adjacent, allowing one-stop shopping; several of these combination stores were designated Family Centers. Stop & Shop also operated the Medi-Mart pharmacy chain and the Perkins Tobacco chain.

=== 1980s ===
In 1980, Stop & Shop had supermarkets in Massachusetts, Connecticut, Rhode Island, New Jersey, and southern New York. The stores were then typical in size at about 30,000 square feet (2,800 m^{2}) on average. Many were next door to their then-co-owned Bradlees Department stores. In the New York and Philadelphia metro areas, Stop & Shop was not able to compete successfully. In 1982, Stop & Shop exited New Jersey, selling most of the stores that were profitable to A&P, which would use these stores to replace their aging fleet of stores. A few stores were sold to ShopRite owners as well as Foodtown owners. Other stores were closed and converted to other uses. In New York State, they sold some of their stores to A&P while selling others to Grand Union and closing others, converting them also to other uses.

In 1982, Stop & Shop built its first superstore in the Pembroke, Massachusetts, area. Superstores were 45,000 to 80,000 square feet (4,200 to 7,400 m^{2}). In addition to traditional supermarket offerings, these stores featured bakeries, pharmacies, moderate selections of general merchandise one would not expect to find at a supermarket, expanded deli departments, cafes, and a salad bar. Some of these stores would feature a bank, expanded liquor and beer, video rentals, etc. Throughout the 1980s and into the 1990s, the traditional supermarkets were converted into superstores. Some were remodeled, others were torn down, and a new store was rebuilt in the same location, while others were closed and replaced with a superstore within two miles.

In early 1985, Stop & Shop bought the small discount store chain Almy's. The remaining Almy's locations closed in 1987.

In the late 1980s, following a hostile takeover bid by Herbert Haft's Dart Group, The Stop & Shop Supermarket Company was acquired by leveraged buyout specialists KKR and was taken private. Shortly thereafter, Medi-Mart was sold to Walgreens; Bradlees was spun off as its own corporation. After several years, while KKR explored merger possibilities with Safeway (which it also controlled at the time), Stop & Shop was sold in a public offering.

By 1990, Stop & Shop operated in Connecticut, Rhode Island, and in Boston and Springfield, Massachusetts, with one store in New York state.

=== 1990s ===
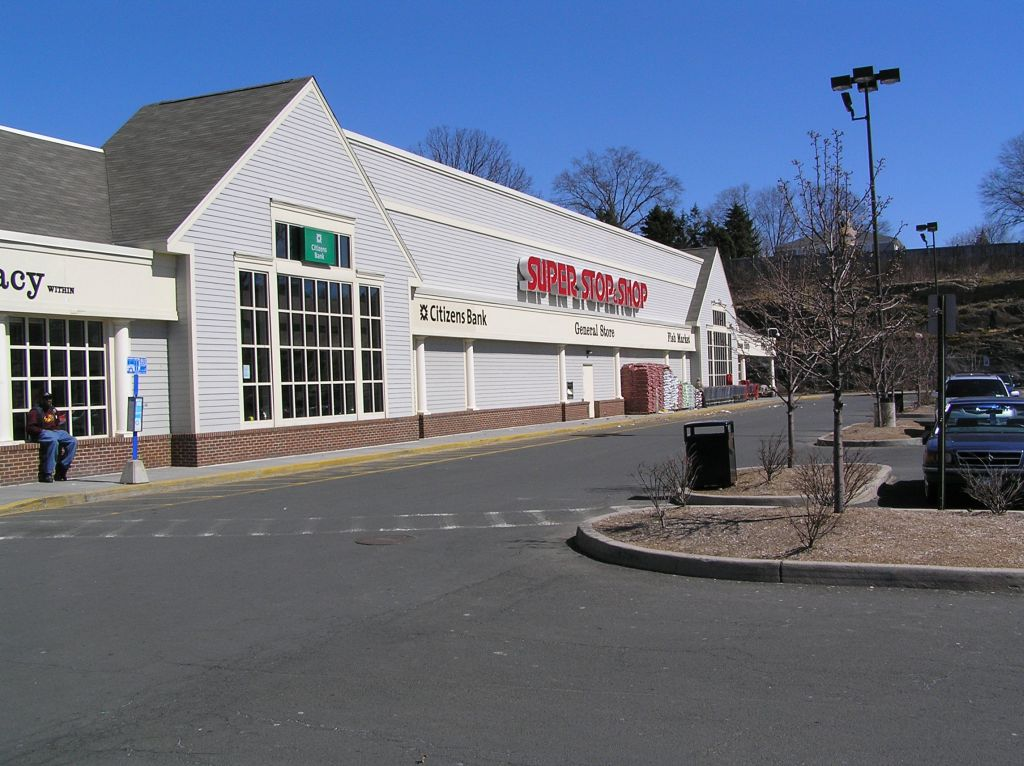
A typical location, using an older logo. This location is in Yonkers, New York.

In 1994, Giant-Landover began expanding by opening stores in Pennsylvania, Delaware, and New Jersey under the Super G trade name. This was done to differentiate itself from its future sister company, Giant Food Stores of Carlisle, Pennsylvania. During 2005, the newly formed Stop & Shop/Giant made the decision to phase out the Super G name in New Jersey and Delaware. In New Jersey, four Super G stores were shuttered, and the remaining eight stores were converted to the Super Stop & Shop banner and became a part of Stop & Shop's New York Sales Division in an attempt to revive sales at the stores. These stores continued to underperform and were subsequently sold in 2007 to ShopRite franchise owners. The Delaware Super G stores were to be remodeled under the Super Stop & Shop format and reopened under the Super Giant banner. Super G stores in Pennsylvania were generally close to Giant-Carlisle locations and were converted to Giant of Carlisle stores but continued to be unionized, unlike most of the other Carlisle-bannered stores.

In 1995, Stop & Shop acquired competitor Purity Supreme supermarkets. Then in 1996 Stop & Shop was bought out by Ahold USA. Ahold had previously bought First National Supermarkets, whose Edwards Super Food Stores and Finast chains also had a strong presence in Connecticut; Ahold planned to operate both Edwards and Stop & Shop there. However, in the wake of the acquisition, Connecticut Attorney General Richard Blumenthal raised antitrust questions, as Stop & Shop and Edwards combined had more than half of the grocery share in Connecticut. Following negotiations with Blumenthal, Ahold decided to convert its New England stores to the Stop & Shop banner, while selling some locations to other chains such as Shaw's, ShopRite, and Grand Union. Ahold also began building a few stores under the Edwards Super Food Stores banner in New York and New Jersey. Ahold also acquired 26 independent Mayfair Foodtown stores in that area, converting them to Edwards. In 1998 and 1999, several Super Stop & Shop stores were built in the Poughkeepsie area.

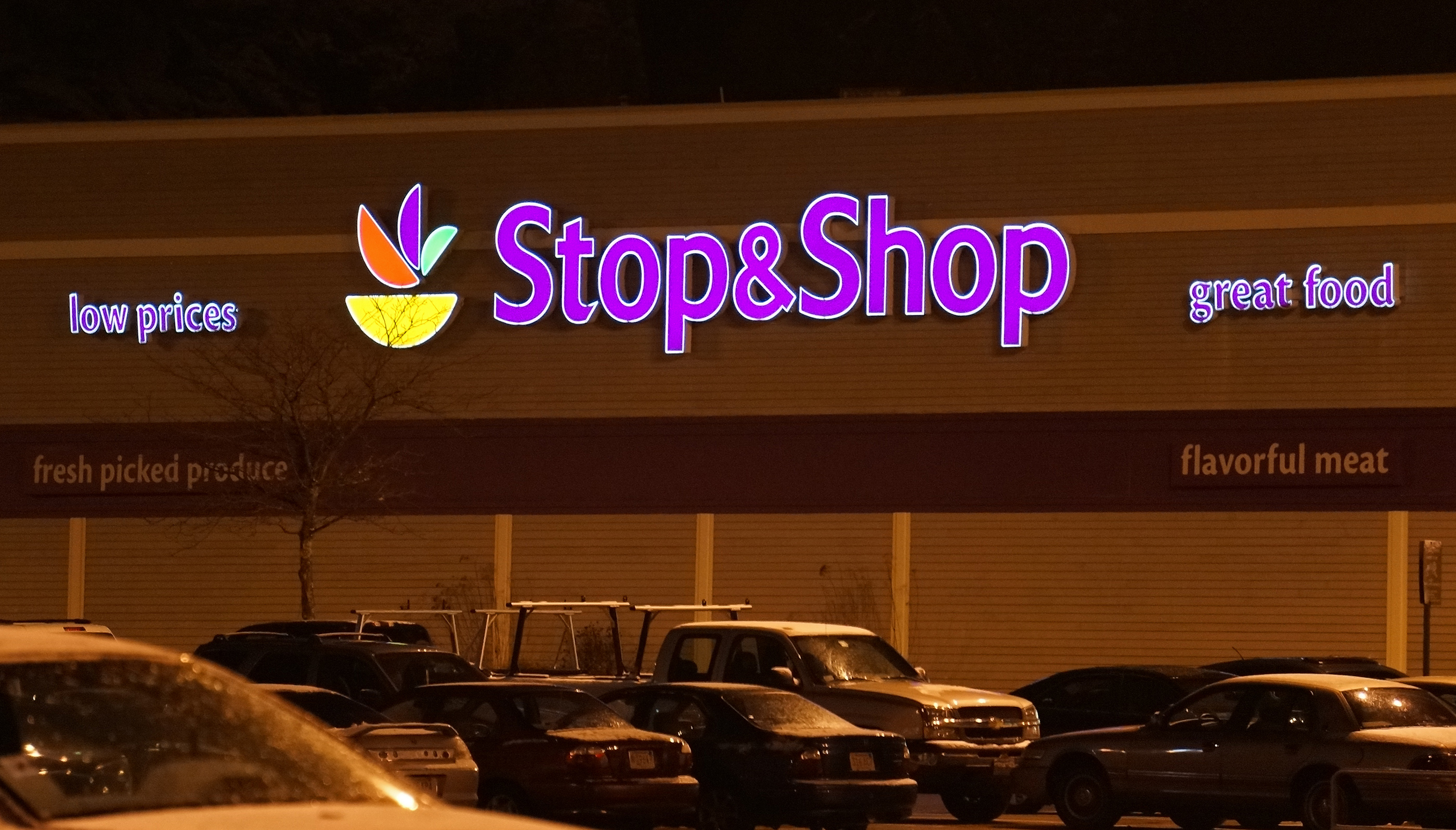
A newer Stop & Shop in Saugus, Massachusetts.

In 1999, Ahold and the New Jersey-based Pathmark entered merger talks, and a deal was struck under which Ahold would acquire Pathmark and rebrand Edwards and its Carlisle, Pennsylvania-based sibling Giant under its banner. After the government rejected the deal due to their belief that Ahold would hold too large a stake in the grocery store market in the New York and Pennsylvania areas, Ahold eventually pulled out because they were not willing to make a series of divestments necessary for approval.

=== 2000s ===
In 2000, Ahold decided again to try to rebrand the Edwards stores and eventually decided to bring the Stop & Shop chain back to the New York area. By the end of 2000 the rebranding was complete and the Edwards name was discontinued.

In 2001, Ahold made moves to expand the Stop & Shop brand further into New Jersey and New York; these came as Grand Union, one of its competitors, was going through a bankruptcy liquidation. Through a series of moves, C&S Wholesale Grocers acquired the Grand Union chain of stores and downsized it significantly, selling many of its New Jersey and New York area stores to Ahold. Ahold in turn started supplying these stores with merchandise but did not immediately rebrand their acquisitions to Stop & Shop; that would happen in the spring and summer of 2001. Stop & Shop also began testing full-service Dunkin' Donuts storefronts within their supermarkets, starting with locations in Mansfield, Quincy and Dedham. They officially began a strategic alliance the following year, with 70 locations throughout New England adding a Dunkin' Donuts.

In 2003, Ahold acquired many of the A&P Foodmart locations in the Hartford, Connecticut area, Rhode Island, Massachusetts, and the one remaining New Hampshire store. Other A&P locations in that region closed or were sold to other supermarket chains. In 2004, Ahold integrated Stop & Shop Supermarkets with Giant Food and created one combined company with the name of Stop & Shop/Giant-Landover.

In 2006, Stop & Shop signed a contract with Starbucks, placing the coffee shop chain's licensed stores inside certain supermarkets. They planned to replace most, if not all, Dunkin' Donuts locations. Also in May 2006, Stop & Shop began piloting the Shopping Buddy program in select stores in Massachusetts and Connecticut. The Shopping Buddy is a personal shopping assistant that allows customers to track their purchases and to do in-cart bagging as they move through the store.

In 2007, Stop & Shop made an attempt to expand further into northern New England. They built, but did not operate, a single Vermont store in Rutland before selling it to rival supermarket operator Delhaize. Delhaize opened the store under its Hannaford banner in February 2008.

In July 2007, Stop & Shop announced that it would close nine underperforming stores in southern New Jersey, effective the following month, marking its exit from the southern New Jersey market; the company also closed its Middletown, New York location. The affected stores were sold to the retailers’ cooperative Wakefern Food Corporation, which subsequently transferred them to independent operators who reopened them under the ShopRite banner. That same month, Stop & Shop opened a single Maine store in Kennebunk. The store was closed in October 2009, citing slow sales as the primary reason. At the same time, they abandoned plans to build a second Maine store in Portland. Delhaize purchased the vacant Kennebunk location in December 2009 and later reopened the property under the Hannaford banner.

In October 2007, Stop & Shop launched an advertising campaign that was intended to have users submit stories and videos to a website detailing their grocery store experiences. The campaign was significant in that it is an early example of a regional traditional brand employing Web 2.0 concepts such as user-generated content to promote their stores.

On August 22, 2008, Stop & Shop changed its logo as a re-branding project along with its sister company, Giant-Landover. In August 2009, Stop & Shop announced closures and re-brandings for a large portion of the licensed Starbucks stores opened in 2006.

=== 2010s ===
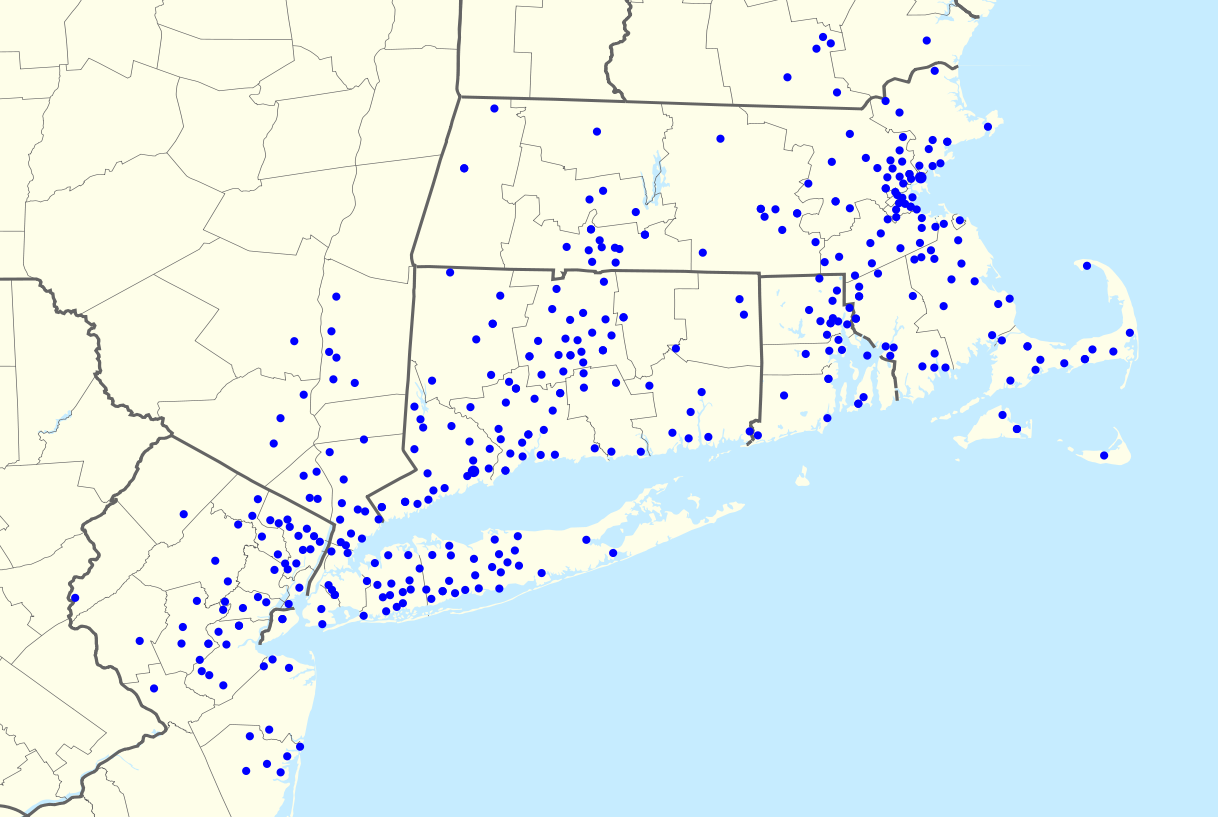
Map of Stop & Shop stores in August 2010. There have been some openings and closings since then, including the closing of all stores in New Hampshire.

By late 2013, Stop & Shop had a very strong base in Massachusetts, Rhode Island, and Connecticut, with more stores in New York and New Jersey. All six of the remaining New Hampshire stores had closed in August 2013, marking the chain's departure from northern New England. A few Connecticut stores, in Bridgeport, Hamden, and Orange, also closed during the two subsequent years.

In April 2015, Stop & Shop started construction of an anaerobic digester at its distribution center in Freetown, Massachusetts, which now supplies 40% of the site's electricity needs. In July 2015, Stop & Shop announced the intentions to purchase 25 stores from A&P (which filed for Chapter 11 bankruptcy earlier that month), including A&P's most profitable location in Mt. Kisco, New York, and convert all of the purchased stores to the Stop & Shop banner by the end of November 2015. On September 22, 2015, the sale of 25 A&P stores to Stop & Shop and 70 A&P stores to competitor Acme Markets was approved by a judge in federal bankruptcy court. Most of the stores purchased by Stop & Shop and Acme had been operating under the Pathmark or Waldbaum's banners (A&P had acquired Waldbaum's in 1986 and had bought Pathmark in 2007). As of March 2018, Stop & Shop operated 411 stores throughout the three southern New England states, as well as in downstate New York and northern New Jersey.

In October 2018, Stop & Shop began renovations at many of their Hartford, Connecticut regional stores and began adding new features to these stores, including cafes, in-store meat smokers, smoothie bars and taqueria stations. A new version of the old logo was also implemented at these stores, which would serve as a test market for the entire chain.

On January 4, 2019, it was announced that Stop & Shop would be acquiring the King Kullen supermarket chain on Long Island. Stop & Shop would acquire the chain's 32 King Kullen and 5 Wild By Nature stores.

=== 2020s ===
On April 17, 2020, it was announced that the King Kullen deal was set to close on April 30, 2020. On June 10, 2020, it was announced that the acquisition deal had been terminated and that King Kullen would remain independent due to "unforeseen changes in the marketplace".

On July 12, 2024, Stop & Shop announced the closure of 32 underperforming locations as part of a plan to improve the company's finances. The company faced serious competition from other nearby grocers and high rising costs, which caused the decision to close some of its stores. The 32 closing stores will close on or before November 2, 2024.

== Criticism ==
In 1999, one of Stop & Shop’s shell companies sold a property in Quincy, Massachusetts with deed restrictions explicitly naming Stop & Shop as the beneficiary. They state that the property cannot be used to sell fresh fruits and vegetables, baked goods, dairy products, frozen foods, fish, poultry, and meat. The restrictions remain in effect for a total of 99 years. The property, which was purchased by Daniel J. Quirk and developed as a car dealership, sits directly across the highway from a Super Stop & Shop.

In 2003, Connecticut Attorney General Richard Blumenthal (later a US Senator), opened an investigation into Stop & Shop for its land-acquisition practices and allegations of anti-competitive behavior in the early 1990s, said Jaclyn Falkowskie, spokeswoman for the Connecticut Attorney General. Investigators, however, found that Stop & Shop’s actions did not violate the state’s antitrust laws, and the investigation was closed, she said. Regardless of the strategy's legality, consumer advocates find fault because it limits the potential number of supermarkets in an area, reducing competition and selection for consumers.

Another shell company with ties to Stop & Shop placed similar deed restrictions on a property in Harwich, Massachusetts before selling it to Eastward Homes Business Trust in 2006. The wording is materially similar, going so far as to list specific brands of pet food under restriction. The restrictions can remain in place for up to 90 years.

== Contract negotiations and complications ==
=== 2007 ===
On February 17, 2007, the collective bargaining agreements between Stop & Shop management and its employees expired after three years. In an attempt to maintain their current health care benefits, union workers threatened to strike. Stop & Shop wanted employees to share the cost of health care, but union workers believed Stop & Shop should pay it in full. Workers were paying co-payments for office visits and medical procedures, as well as deductibles for health care costs and hospital costs. The grocery chain wanted to implement weekly contributions of between $5 and $21 on top of the co-payments. These fees would increase throughout the three-year contract.

At midnight on February 23, 2007, Stop & Shop grocery workers in Connecticut, Rhode Island, and Massachusetts had voted overwhelmingly to reject a contract proposal and to authorize a strike against the grocery chain. The contracts for United Food and Commercial Workers Locals 328, 371, 919, 1445, and 1459 expired on February 17, 2007, and were extended to cover until February 22, 2007, but the union and the grocery chain agreed to extend the deadline two more days, to midnight February 24, 2007. Officials with Stop & Shop and the United Food and Commercial Workers continued negotiating through March 2, 2007, extending the contract until 12:01 a.m. March 3, 2007, given that talks were scheduled to continue through Friday. Both sides extended the negotiations, which resumed February 26, 2007. On March 3, 2007, the five unions involved gave the company a comprehensive contract proposal that covered every aspect of their five agreements and identified what they believed to be a fair and equitable contract for everyone. On March 7, 2007, the five locals representing workers in Connecticut, Rhode Island and Massachusetts scheduled voting on a new contract, extending the strike deadline to March 12, 2007. The locals delivered a comprehensive contract to Stop & Shop negotiators. Approximately 43,000 unionized Stop & Shop workers in three states could have either had a new contract that Sunday or begun walking picket lines, possibly that Monday, according to union officials.

The stop-and-go negotiations concluded with a three-year contract overwhelmingly ratified by union members across New England, and a strike was averted. In addition to raises and retroactive payments, Stop & Shop made changes regarding health insurance. Full-time workers would be required to contribute each week to their healthcare plans, while part-time workers would continue to make no contributions toward health care premiums, retaining the existing practice, which covered union workers' health insurance entirely except for co-payments and deductibles.

=== 2019 ===
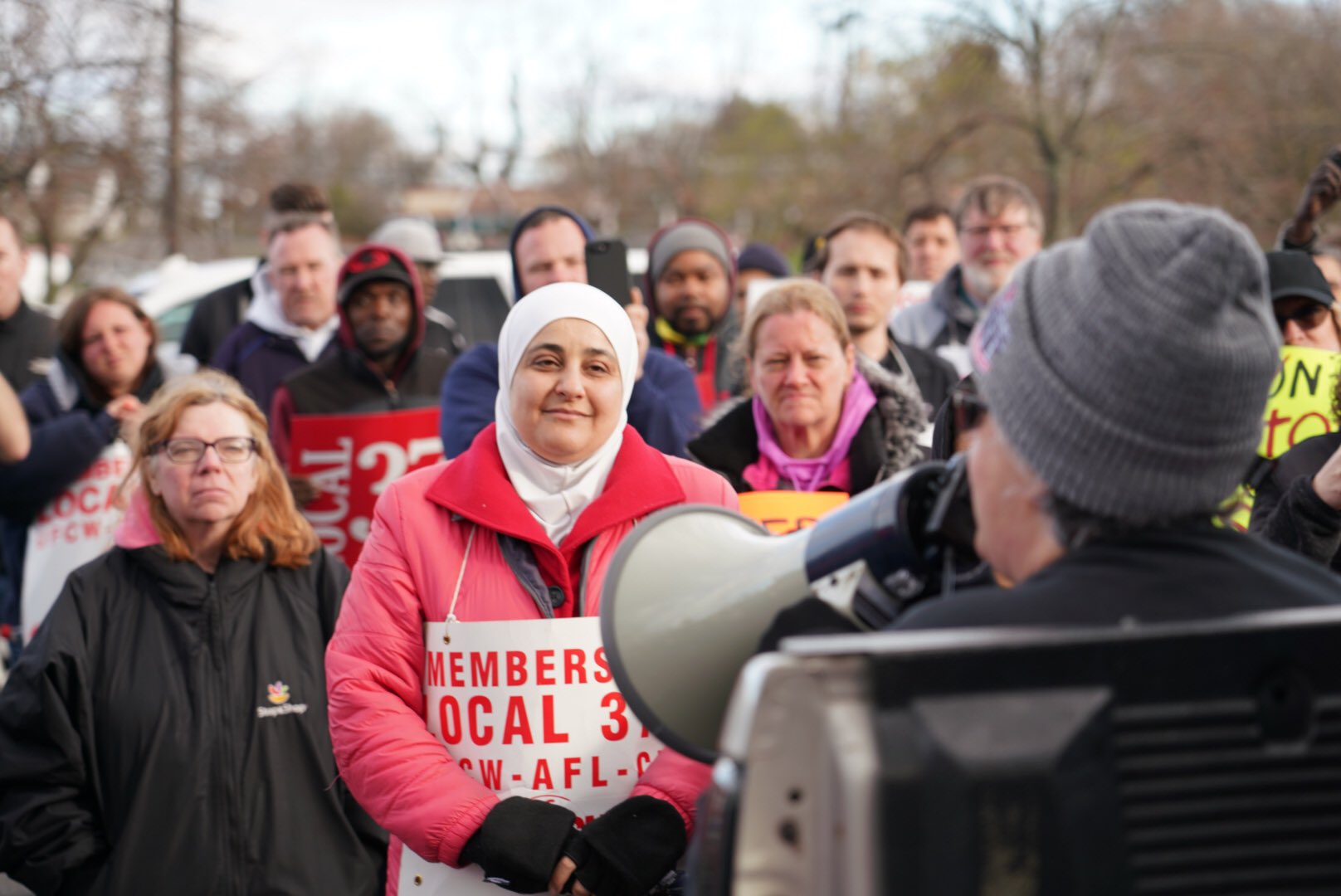
Workers during the 2019 Stop & Shop strike.

The 2016 collective bargaining agreement between Stop & Shop and its union staff expired at midnight on February 23, 2019. In an effort to reach a memorandum of understanding before the contract's expiration date, the five local chapters of the United Food and Commercial Workers International Union (UFCW) that represents 30,000 of Stop & Shop's employees in locations across New England, in the states of Massachusetts, Rhode Island, and Connecticut began negotiating a new contract on January 14, 2019. Negotiations throughout the remainder of January were promising, with the local chapters working out "wording" technicalities with the company. However, progress was effectively halted in early to mid-February after Stop & Shop presented their monetary and payroll requirements for the upcoming agreement's term. The proposal effectively strips all of the company's union employees of premium pay on national holidays and Sundays (bringing the store in line with current state law, which eliminated Sunday overtime pay), while also eliminating any raises, reducing contributions to pensions, and increasing healthcare costs. Negotiations continued in good faith between the two sides, but with no progress made, UFCW Local 1445 of Massachusetts became the first chapter to authorize a strike if needed on February 24, 2019. In the following weeks, the members of the four other UFCW unions also authorized a potential strike as a response to further progress stagnation. The strike did not occur, and negotiations continued sporadically through the first week of April. On April 3, 2019, federal mediators were brought in after the unions rejected Stop & Shop's "last offer" contract. An unfruitful round of negotiations overseen by the federal negotiators broke down on April 10, 2019, and a strike was called the next day. Union Stop & Shop employees walked off the job at 1:00 p.m. on April 11, 2019, to strike against the contract posited by Stop & Shop. Candidates for the 2020 Democratic presidential nomination, including Bernie Sanders, the junior senator from Vermont, and former Vice President Joe Biden have stated support for Stop & Shop's employees strike for a fair contract. Elizabeth Warren, the senior senator from Massachusetts who was also a candidate for the nomination, joined workers at the Somerville, Massachusetts location to rally for a fair new contract and to pass out food for the striking workers. The strike ended eleven days later on April 21. In August 2019, Ahold Delhaize reported the strike resulted in a $345 million loss in sales.

== Price disparities ==
In 2023, high schoolers with the Hyde Square Task Force studied alleged price disparities between a Stop & Shop location in Boston's Jamaica Plain neighborhood, a relative lower-income community, and Boston suburb Dedham, a community where the median household income is more than four times that of Jamaica Plain. The teens say a shopper at the Jamaica Plain location would spend an estimated $2,800 more per year than a shopper at the Dedham location, despite the stores being just eight miles (13 km) apart. The students reached out to Stop & Shop, which put out a statement saying that those numbers are proprietary and that many factors play into price decisions. Since the report, the team has attracted the attention of Massachusetts lawmakers and the Massachusetts Attorney General Andrea Campbell.
