= Giant Food (Landover) =

American supermarket chain

Giant Food of Maryland, LLC
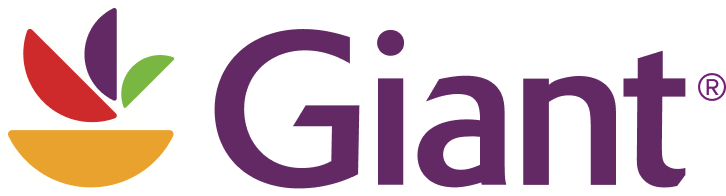
- Type: Subsidiary of Ahold Delhaize
- Industry: Retail
- Founded: December 15, 1936 (89 years ago) as Giant Food Shopping Center Inc.
- Founders: Nehemiah Meir Cohen and Samuel Lehrman
- Headquarters: 8301 Professional Place; Suite 115; Landover, Maryland, U.S.
- Number of locations: 165 stores; 153 pharmacies
- Key people: Ira Kress, President
- Products: Grocery, general merchandise, gasoline
- Services: Supermarket; Pharmacy
- Revenue: ▲$5.62 billion (2020)
- Number of employees: 22,000
- Parent: Ahold Delhaize
- Website: Official website

Giant Food of Maryland, LLC is an American regional supermarket chain with 166 stores located in Delaware, Maryland, Virginia, and the District of Columbia. It is a subsidiary of Ahold Delhaize, and headquartered in unincorporated Prince George's County, Maryland, near Landover.

Giant Food is also known in business context as Giant-Landover, to avoid confusion with The Giant Company, a Pennsylvania-based sister chain also owned by Ahold Delhaize and often referred to as Giant-Carlisle.

== History ==
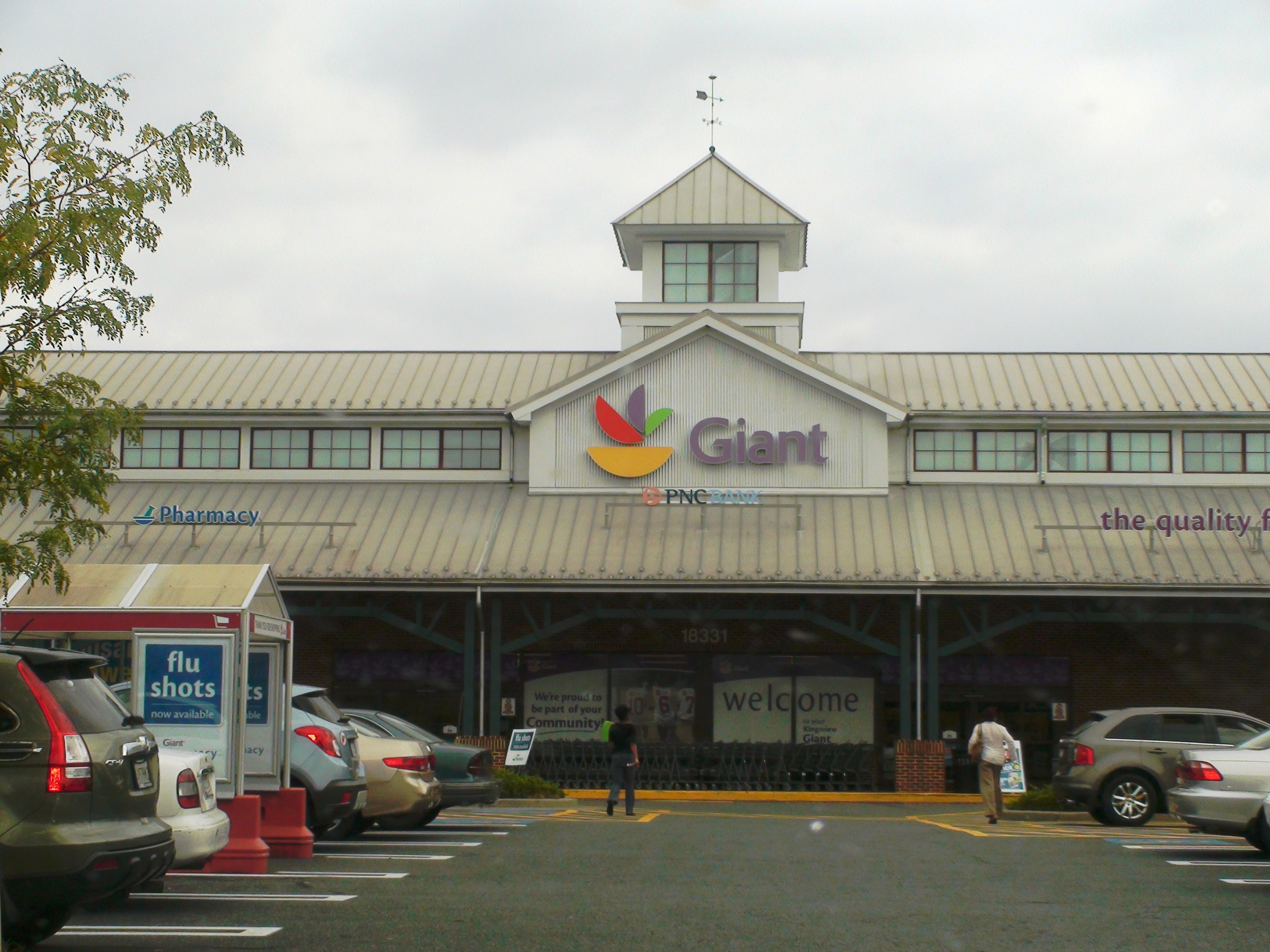
Giant Food store in Germantown, Maryland, in September 2013

=== 1930s ===
Giant was founded in 1936 by Nehemiah Meir "N.M." Cohen and Samuel Lehrman. Cohen was a rabbi who had emigrated from Palestine following World War I and opened a kosher meat market in Carnegie, Pennsylvania. Lehrman was the financial backer who provided the funds for the company's creation. The first store was at Georgia Avenue NW and Park Road NW in the District of Columbia.

In its early years, as African Americans experienced segregation, Giant was criticized for not opening any locations in predominantly African-American neighborhoods.

=== 1940s ===
The chain experienced rapid growth following World War II, growing from nine stores in 1946 to 17 in 1950. Co-founder Samuel Lehrman died aged 70 while wintering in Miami Beach, Florida in January 1949.

=== 1950s ===
Between 1950 and 1952, Giant added five new stores, joining in the general expansion of the American economy. At this time, the shopping center concept was taking hold in America and Giant put a new store in the Congressional Plaza Shopping Center in Rockville, Maryland.

In 1955 the chain opened its first store in the Baltimore metropolitan area at Ingleside Shopping Center in Catonsville, Maryland. By this time 48 percent of all its stores were located in shopping centers. In 1958, riding a new merchandising trend of combination supermarket/department stores, Giant opened its first Super Giant store and within a year had opened eight more. Also in 1958, the company opened its new headquarters and distribution center on a 40-acre site in Landover, Maryland.

In 1957 Giant Food Shopping Center Inc. became Giant Food Inc., and fiscal 1958 saw sales of more than $100 million. In 1959 the company, with 53 stores (including nine Super Giant stores) went public.

In 1959, the Cohens formed the Naomi and Nehemiah Cohen Foundation. The foundation primarily donated to local human services organizations in the DC area and to Jewish organizations, including the Edlavitch Jewish Community Center of Washington, D.C.

During this time Giant computerized its inventory data, customer information, and payroll and bookkeeping operations. Customer service features added in the 1950s included self-opening doors, mechanized checkouts, and open display cases to make meats and frozen food directly accessible to the customer.

In the 1950s, Giant initiated a scholarship program to encourage students to pursue food management careers. Two of the first five recipients later became senior vice-presidents at Giant.

=== 1960s ===
Former Giant logo, used from 1963 to 2008

In 1962, Giant opened its first combination food store and pharmacy located in Glen Burnie, Maryland, in the Southdale Shopping Center. Giant is noted as the first grocery chain in the United States to bring pharmacy services in-store.

Israel "Izzy" Cohen inherited the family mantle in 1964 and built the company into the 12th-largest food chain in the United States.

Around the time the Civil Rights Act of 1964 was passed, Giant began opening new locations in predominantly Black neighborhoods, in response to early criticism over failing to do so since beginning operations.

Giant Food also owned a clothing store called Pants Corral from 1972 until 1985, when it was sold to Carson Pirie Scott. That company converted all of the Pants Corral stores to County Seat.

=== 1990s ===
Cohen died in 1995 at the age of 83. A holding company was formed because "none of the members of my family have had any experience or interest in operating Giant Food..." Three years after Cohen died, Giant was bought by Royal Ahold, a Dutch conglomerate. Ahold promised few changes to the chain, but Ahold was soon plunged into turmoil after a financial scandal. Starting in 1994, they expanded into the Philadelphia/Delaware/South Jersey area, but under the name Super G, as to avoid confusion with future sister chain Giant of Carlisle. In 2005, the decision was made to phase out the Super G trade name and convert the Southern New Jersey stores to the Stop & Shop banner; however, these stores did not perform well and in 2007 were sold to ShopRite franchises. The Delaware locations were to be remodeled and reopened using the Super Stop & Shop format, under the Super Giant banner.

=== 2000s ===
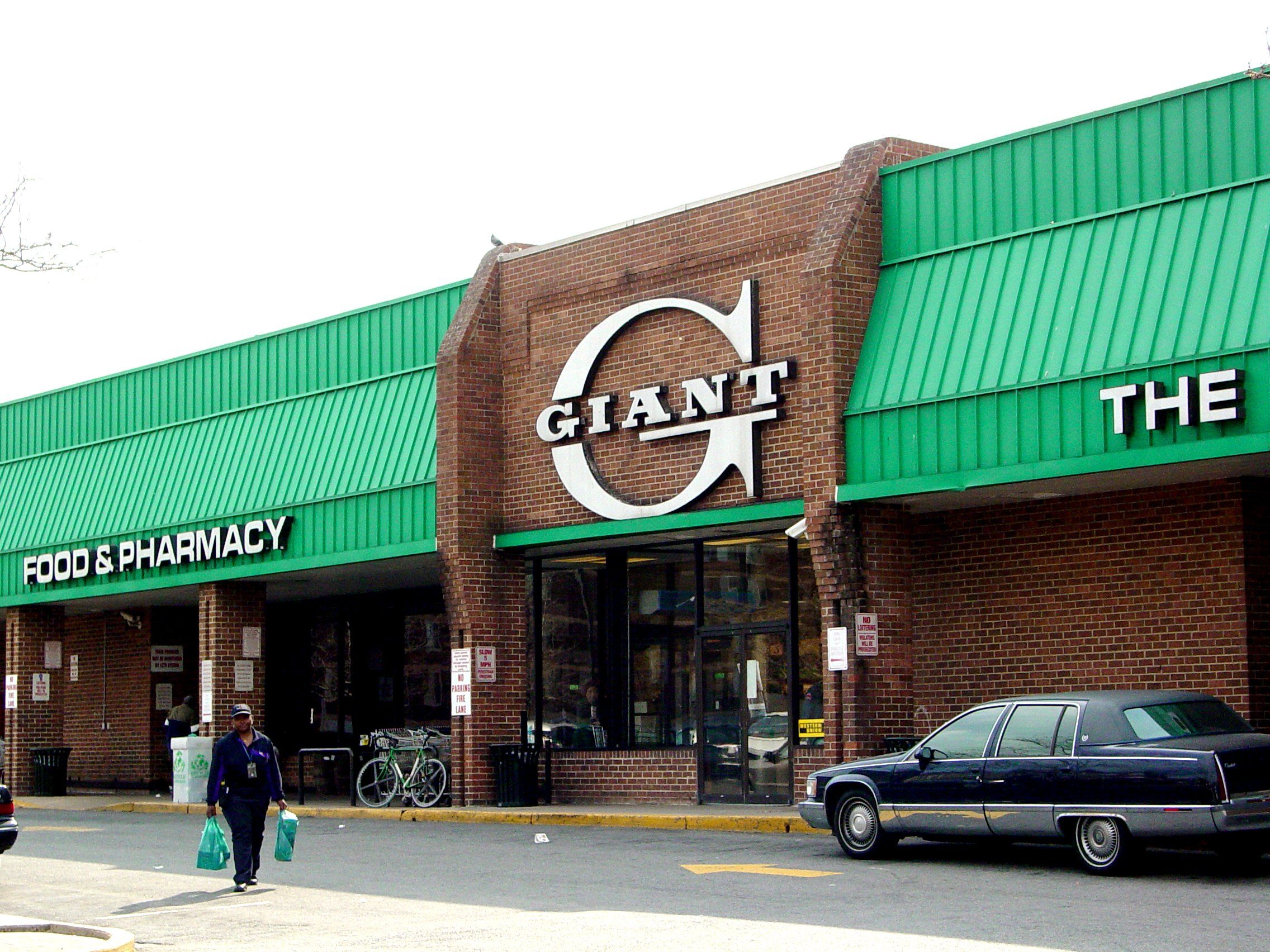
A Giant Food store in March 2006, located at 9th and O Streets NW in Washington, D.C. It has since been replaced by a nearby store.

In 2001, Giant had 184 stores.

In 2004, Ahold merged Giant and Stop & Shop and eliminated more than 600 positions at Giant's Landover headquarters, creating Stop & Shop/Giant-Landover, which itself is a subsidiary of Netherlands-based Royal Ahold. In 2006, Giant signed a five-year agreement with Starbucks Coffee to open Starbucks locations in several of Giant's stores. The agreement was not renewed upon expiration in 2011 because many of the shopping centers that played host to Giant stores also were hosts of standalone Starbucks locations. Giant introduced a new logo on August 21, 2008, as part of a larger rebranding campaign; the logo was shared with Stop & Shop until Stop & Shop updated their logo in 2018.

=== 2010s ===
In September 2012, Giant sold its 760,000 sq ft (71,000 m^{2}) distribution facility in Jessup, Maryland. The company outsourced distribution to C&S Wholesale Grocers, relocating its operations to Pennsylvania.

In 2019, Giant became an omnichannel grocery retailer through their launch of Giant Pickup, an online eCommerce channel to order groceries and pick them up at a local Giant location. In 2020, Giant followed up with Giant Delivers, a direct eCommerce model that allowed online shoppers at Giant's website to place orders to be delivered directly to their home or office. Giant also allows eCommerce orders to be placed through Instacart.

=== 2020s ===
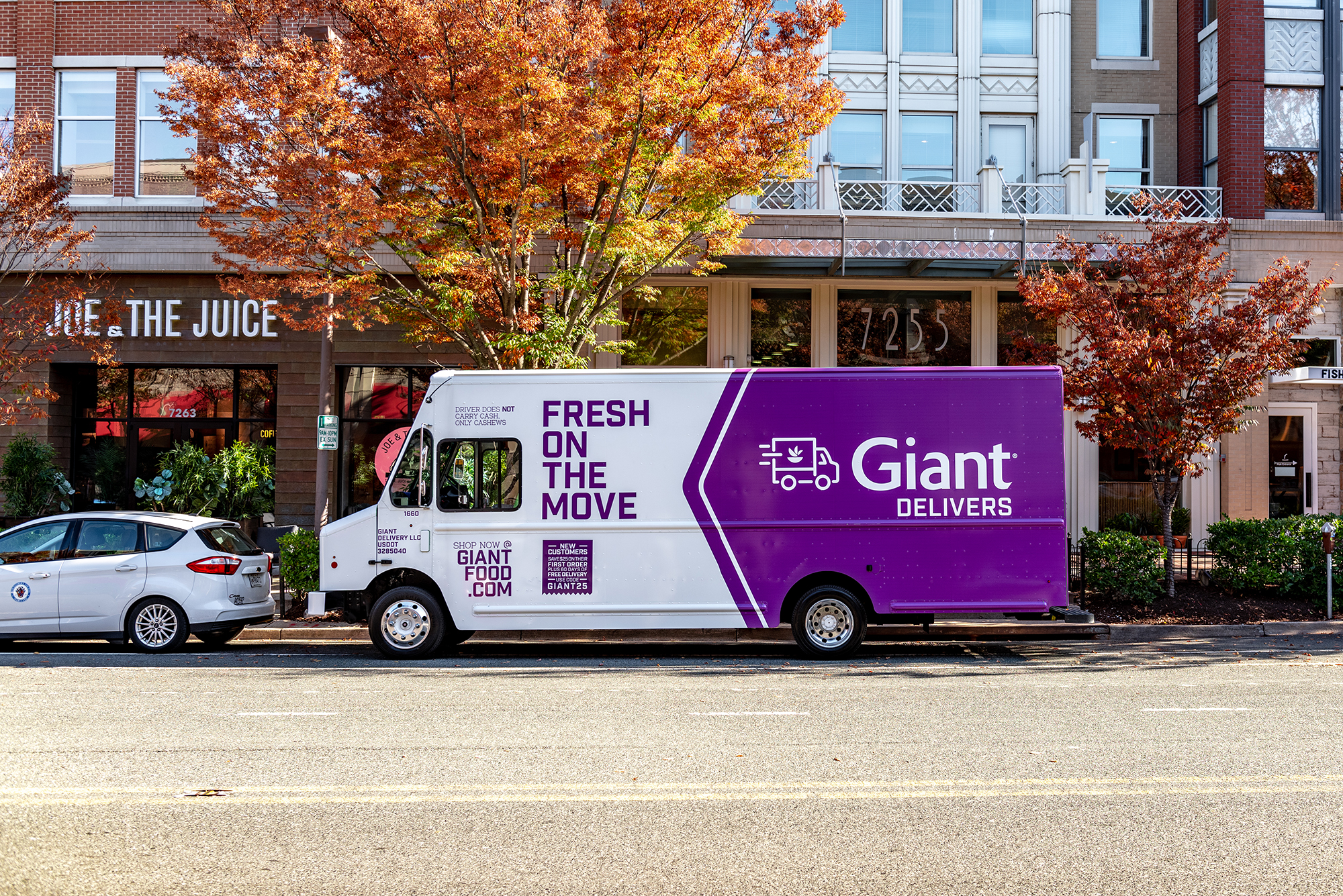
Giant Delivers truck, part of eCommerce service that was launched with Giant Food in 2020

On January 17, 2020, Giant announced a new line of private label wines named Artie. The wines include chardonnay, pinot grigio, cabernet sauvignon, and sauvignon blanc varietals, and are available in 57 stores in Virginia.

Giant evolved its loyalty program with the launch of Giant Flexible Rewards in March 2020, encouraging a digital relationship with customers to earn loyalty points in return for gas and grocery savings, as well as redemptions for Giant products. The program was cited in the top 20 grocery reward programs in the country in 2020, via Newsweek's America's Best Loyalty Programs. The program repeated its placement in 2022 and 2023, one of only nine national programs to place all three years. Flexible Rewards surpassed the one million member mark in 2022.

During the COVID-19 pandemic, Giant pharmacies have served to vaccinate individuals in the region, and as of December 2021, surpassed one million vaccinations for the year, including COVID-19, seasonal flu, and other vaccines.

== Bibliography ==
- Fisher, Eric (September 21, 1998). "Dutch Retailer Royal Ahold to Wrap Up Acquisition of Maryland's Giant Foods". Knight Ridder/Tribune Business News. Archived from the original on January 17, 2013 – via HighBeam Research.
