= Stop & Shop/Giant-Landover =

Combined supermarket chain

- Type: Wholly owned subsidiary of Ahold
- Industry: Grocery
- Founded: 2004 (Quincy, Massachusetts)
- Defunct: 2011
- Fate: Separated and are now operating as independent companies but continued some similar branding with Stop & Shop until 2018
- Headquarters: Quincy, Massachusetts
- Products: Deli, bakery, produce, snacks, pharmacy, frozen foods, floral
- Website: https://stopandshop.com/ https://giantfood.com/

Stop & Shop/Giant-Landover was a combined supermarket chain owned by the American subsidiary of the Dutch retailer Ahold. The company took its form in 2004, after Ahold decided to combine the operations of its New England–based Stop & Shop chain with its Landover, Maryland-based Giant Food chain to create the largest supermarket company in the Mid-Atlantic States. Giant's headquarters relocated in Landover, Maryland, and Stop & Shop kept their headquarters in Quincy, Massachusetts. This combination failed, as Mid-Atlantic market area shoppers grocery needs did not align with those of Stop & Shop's offerings. In 2011 the two companies were separated and now operate independently. The separation of Stop & Shop/Giant-Landover, also brought the separation of the Stop & Shop Supermarket into two separate operating divisions, Stop & Shop-New England and Stop & Shop-New York. Both Giant Food and Stop & Shop's two divisions continued to share the same fruit basket logo until 2018 when Stop & Shop reintroduced their stoplight logo.

Stop & Shop operates a total of 416 stores in Massachusetts, Rhode Island, Connecticut, upstate and metropolitan New York, and New Jersey. Giant boasts 169 stores in Delaware, Maryland, Pennsylvania, Virginia, and the District of Columbia. The combined chain competed with regional chains such as Shaw's, Hannaford, Tops, Big Y, Wegmans, Price Chopper, ShopRite, Pathmark, Waldbaum's, King Kullen, Weis Markets, Acme, and Food Lion as well as national chains such as Aldi, big box stores such as Walmart Supercenters and Super Targets, and warehouse chains such as Sam's Club and Costco.

== History ==
In early 2004, Royal Ahold made the move to end local management at Giant Food's headquarters in Landover, Maryland. Ahold also named Stop & Shop's chief executive Marc E. Smith as the new head of Giant Food.

In March 2005, Giant-Stop & Shop announced that they had entered into a collaboration with Staples, Inc. for a Staples branded store-within-store section for all 550 Stop & Shop Supermarkets and Giant Food supermarkets in the Northeast region. The section made its debut in July 2005. The area ranges from 40 to 80 feet in size and carries 500 to 1,200 products that are a wide variety of national school and home office brands as well as Staples brand products. Some products made their initial debut within Giant-Stop & Shop supermarkets. Before Giant-Stop & Shop's/Staples joint announcement, the Staples store-within-store concept was first tested in 60 Stop & Shop supermarkets.

In August 2008, the combined company unveiled a new universal logo for the stores, replacing the stoplight logo for Stop & Shop and the Big G logo for Giant.

In 2011, Gordon Reid was named Giant Food of Maryland's Division President after the two chains were divided and Giant Food returned to operating as an independent grocer.
