= Plenti =

Short-lived rewards program from American Express

- Founded: May 4, 2015
- Defunct: July 10, 2018 (3 years, 2 months and 6 days)
- Fate: Discontinued by American Express
- Area served: United States
- Parent: American Express
- Website: Archived official website at the Wayback Machine (archive index)

Plenti was an American rewards program created by American Express in 2015 and discontinued in 2018. During its operation, Plenti let users earn points at one retailer and use them at the same or other retailers that were enrolled in the program.

== History ==
Plenti launched on May 4, 2015. It allowed shoppers to earn rewards through a variety of purchases. Unlike other loyalty programs such as supermarket loyalty programs, Plenti was not tied to a single company or credit card issuer. Users could join for free and did not have to be American Express cardholders.

Plenti was part of American Express' push to broaden its reach following the loss of its exclusive deals with Costco (which switched to Citi and Visa) and JetBlue (which switched to Barclays and MasterCard).

When 2017 ended, Direct Energy, Hulu, Nationwide, Enterprise, Alamo, and Expedia left Plenti. On January 31, 2018, Macy's and Chili's announced that they were also leaving Plenti.

An online marketplace where users could earn Plenti points through online retailers such as Walmart, Sam's Club, Target, Home Depot, Lowe's, and Under Armour was available from May 2015 through March 15, 2018. A member would log into the marketplace and then be directed to the desired retailer's website, thereby earning points for their account. At least one point was earned per $1 spent.

On April 16, 2018, Plenti confirmed that the program would end on July 10, 2018; it suspended new account sign-ups effective immediately.

== Past Participating retailers ==
Retailers that participated in Plenti until 2018:

- ExxonMobil
  - Exxon
  - Mobil
- Rite Aid
- Southeastern Grocers
  - BI-LO
  - Harveys Supermarkets
  - Winn-Dixie
- The Walt Disney Company
- ESPN

Retailers that left Plenti in 2017:

- AT&T
- Chili's
- Direct Energy
- Enterprise Holdings
  - Enterprise
  - Alamo
- Expedia
- Hulu
- Macy's
- Nationwide

=== Mergers and acquisitions of affected partners ===
Upon the announcement that rival drugstore chain Walgreens would purchase some Rite Aid stores, Walgreens said there would be no immediate changes to Rite Aid's loyalty program Wellness+. Walgreens' rewards program was never integrated into Plenti.

Following AT&T's finalization of its purchase of DirecTV two months after the launch of Plenti, DirecTV became a Plenti partner through its ownership by AT&T, but only through the bundling of DirecTV and AT&T's existing services; DirecTV as a standalone service wasn't a Plenti partner. On November 1, 2017, AT&T discontinued its Plenti partnership.
