= C&S Wholesale Grocers =

American wholesale distributor

C&S Wholesale Grocers, LLC
- Type: Private
- Industry: Grocery wholesale and distribution
- Founded: 1918; 108 years ago, in Worcester, Massachusetts
- Founder: Israel Cohen; Abraham Siegel
- Headquarters: Keene, New Hampshire, United States
- Number of locations: over 50 distribution centers in 16 states
- Key people: Richard B. Cohen (executive chairman of the board); Eric Winn (CEO)
- Revenue: $30 billion (as of 2017)
- Number of employees: about 17,000 (as of 2017)
- Website: cswg.com

C&S Wholesale Grocers, LLC is a national wholesale grocery supply company in the United States, based in Keene, New Hampshire. In 2021 it was the eighth-largest privately held company in the United States, as listed by Forbes. C&S operates and supports corporate grocery stores and serves independent franchisees under a chain-style model throughout the Midwest, South and Northeast. C&S owns the Piggly Wiggly grocery brand, which is independently franchised to store operators, the Grand Union supermarkets brand, as well as several private label brands, including Best Yet.

As of 2023, C&S serviced over 7,500 independent supermarkets, chain stores, military bases, and institutions with over 100,000 different products, including produce, meat, dairy products, delicatessen products, fresh/frozen bakery items, health and beauty aids, candy, and tobacco.

Services range from wholesale procurement, category management, pricing, marketing, advertising, merchandising, business and accounting, store design, and engineering. C&S customers include Giant-Carlisle, Giant-Landover, Safeway Inc., Southeastern Grocers, Target Corporation, and independent store/supermarket owner/operators.

== History ==
=== Wholesale operations ===
C&S was founded by Israel Cohen and Abraham Siegel in 1918 in Worcester, Massachusetts. It began as a small grocery distribution center in a three-story building on Winter Street. In 1929 the original building flooded, prompting a move to a new, larger location on Hygeia Street. In the 1940s, as the popularity of supermarkets grew, C&S made several improvements to their distribution process, including a warehouse "roller system" and staffing trucks with one employee who acts as driver and salesman, thus cutting delivery costs in half.

C&S grew dramatically in 1958 after it began serving supermarket chain Big D in Worcester.

In the 1970s, the founder's grandson, Rick Cohen, joined the company. C&S then built and moved into a 300,000-square-foot (28,000 m^{2}) warehouse in Brattleboro, Vermont. With the move, it began serving several supermarket chains, including A&P.

In 1987, Rick Cohen became president and CEO of C&S and was concerned if the company would be able to withstand the upcoming holiday season; deliberating if operations would be able to meet the needs of all customers and at the same time maintain the high level of customer satisfaction that they were known for throughout New England. Some challenges with acquiring stores, such as A&P, included higher operational costs, shrinking margins, customer relationship management, and quality control. In 1988, Rick Cohen met these challenges by implementing the concept of self-managed teams.

In 2013, C&S entered into a partnership with BI-LO to provide warehousing, distribution, and procurement services for Winn-Dixie stores. As a result, C&S began to operate six existing Winn-Dixie distribution centers in the Southeast of the United States. In September 2014, C&S entered into an asset purchase agreement with Associated Wholesalers Inc (AWI), thus allowing C&S to acquire nearly all of their assets. In the same year, C&S completed purchase of Grocers Supply in Houston. In 2015, the company acquired FreshKO Produce Services, Inc., in California.

Some C&S warehouses use an automated storage and retrieval system for grocery dry goods made by Symbotic, LLC, an American robotics warehouse automation company also owned by Rick Cohen.

=== Retail operations ===
==== Grand Union ====
In 2001, C&S moved into retail as it acquired the Grand Union supermarket chain. It was Grand Union's largest unsecured creditor when Grand Union declared bankruptcy, making a stalking horse offer. It sold the chain to Tops Markets in 2012. In 2021, C&S agreed to purchase 12 Tops stores in New York and Vermont following their merger with Price Chopper due to FTC regulations, with the stores to reopen under the new name in January–February 2022.

==== Southern Family Markets ====
The Southern Family Markets banner was created in 2005 when C&S acquired 104 stores from BI-LO, which operated stores under the BI-LO, Bruno's Supermarkets, Food World, FoodMax and Food Fair brand names. Eight of these locations in the Knoxville, Tennessee, market were sold to K-Va-T Food Stores before ever converting to the Southern Family name.

In July 2012, all 57 Southern Family-owned locations in Alabama, Georgia, Mississippi, and Florida were sold to Belle Foods. C&S would continue as Belle Foods’ main distributor until Belle Foods was liquidated in September 2013 and purchased by Associated Wholesale Grocers.

==== Piggly Wiggly Carolina Co. ====
In October 2014, C&S acquired the operations of Piggly Wiggly Carolina Co., which included branding, marketing, store support, accounting, and IT services, for $9.3 million, while the 20 corporately owned Piggly Wiggly Carolina stores were to be sold to independent operators. As of August 2015, there were two corporately owned locations with 46 independently owned locations.

==== Nell's ====
C&S acquired Associated Wholesalers (AWI) in 2014. AWI owned the grocery chain Nell's, which had four locations at the time of the sale. C&S sold three locations and continues to operate a store in Spry, Pennsylvania.

==== Olean Wholesale Grocery ====
C&S announced its acquisition of Olean Wholesale Grocery, which had previously operated as a cooperative of its member grocers in upstate New York and Pennsylvania, in late 2019. Shortly after the purchase closed, C&S announced the closure of the facility.

==== Possible purchase of Kroger/Albertsons stores ====
On September 8, 2023, C&S agreed to purchase 413 stores, multiple banners, eight distribution centers, two regional offices, and five private label brands across 17 states and the District of Columbia as part of the previously announced merger of Kroger and Albertsons on October 14, 2022. This purchase is contingent on the Federal Trade Commission's approval of the said merger. Also as part of this agreement, C&S may be asked to purchase an additional 237 stores in order for merger to gain approval. After a federal judge issued a preliminary injunction barring the merger on December 10, 2024, the merger was called off by Albertsons, negating the deal.

==== Investment in Southeastern Grocers and Winn-Dixie/Harveys stores ====
On February 7, 2025, Aldi Süd announced that it would sell approximately 170 of the 400 stores it acquired from Winn-Dixie’s and Harvey’s parent company Southeastern Grocers as well as the company itself to a private consortium of investors spearheaded by its CEO Anthony Hucker that includes C&S as an investor. The deal also includes Winn-Dixie liquor stores. ALDI intends to complete its previously stated conversion plans with a total of approximately 220 Winn-Dixie and Harveys Supermarket stores to be converted to the ALDI format over a multi-year conversion process expected to conclude in 2027. SEG will continue to operate the remaining stores identified for conversion in the normal course of business until each respective store is closed for conversion.

==== Acquisition of SpartanNash ====
In June 2025, C&S announced it had made a bid to purchase the grocer SpartanNash for around $1.77 billion. The deal closed in September 2025.

== Litigation ==
In January 2009, lawsuits were filed in federal courts in Wisconsin and New Hampshire alleging that C&S and SuperValu engaged in collusion to allocate markets and reduce competition. In 2018, a federal jury cleared C&S of the charges.
