= Red Food =

American supermarket chain

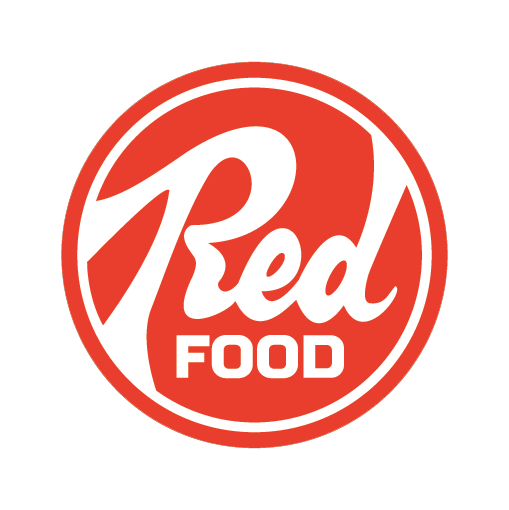
- Industry: Retail (Grocery)
- Founded: 1908 Chattanooga, Tennessee
- Defunct: 1995
- Fate: Merged into BI-LO
- Headquarters: Chattanooga, Tennessee

Red Food Stores, Inc. (or simply Red Food) was a supermarket chain company headquartered in Chattanooga, Tennessee. It operated stores mostly in northwest Georgia, northeast Alabama, and southeast Tennessee. Around 55 stores were operated in the same three states. According to The Chattanoogan, Red Food was a longtime icon in Chattanooga history.

== History ==
Red Food was started in 1908 by Frank McDonald. During World War II, for the first time, Red Food sold turkeys for forty-five cents per pound to customers for Thanksgiving. They also told customers to "invite a soldier and serve turkey this Thanksgiving." In 1979, Promodès, a food distribution firm based in Caen, France, made a bid to buy Red Food Stores, Inc. for $23 million (~$82.2 million in 2025). By 1980, the acquisition was completed for a total of $36 million (~$118 million in 2025). The Red Food purchase gave Promodès 34 supermarkets in Tennessee, Georgia and Alabama. In order to finance Promodès' expansion, which would invest more than Ffr 2 billion between 1979 and 1984, the company went public in 1979.

The Chattanooga store was built in 1984. By 1988, the chain's sales reached $600 million, 30% of Promodès' consolidated sales.

In April 1989, Red Food Store's purchase of seven supermarkets in its hometown owned by Kroger Co. was halted at virtually the 11th hour by the Federal Trade Commission, which decided the merger would substantially hamper competition in the market. The FTC action came unexpectedly. A month later, the FTC issued a complaint, challenging Red Food Stores' $6.5 million acquisition of all seven Kroger Co. grocery stores in Chattanooga, Tennessee. The commission lodged the complaint after a Federal appeals court rejected its request for an injunction blocking the transaction.

In 1994, Red Food Stores, Inc. was bought by Ahold for $129 million, while Red Food stores were changed into Ahold's BI-LO stores in 1995. Merging the Red Food stores was tenuous because of the stores' outdated computer system, but the acquisition effectively grew Ahold's yearly benefits.

In July 2015, Southeastern Grocers, the current owner of BI-LO, announced the sale of its 21 BI-LO stores in the Chattanooga market and eight stores in Northern Georgia to K-VA-T Food Stores, which would rebrand the stores under its Food City banner. This sale ended BI-LO's presence in the Tennessee market.

== Logos ==
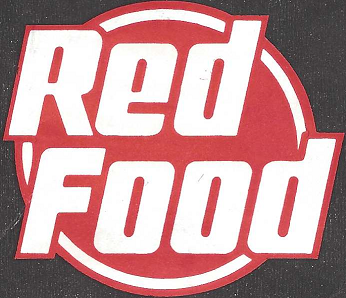
The 1994 logo

The first logo used by Red Food Stores, Inc. was similar to the second one (as seen in this article), but with a rooster in the middle of it. The last logo used was plain red with little or no curves around the inside and outside of the letters. It was introduced a year before Ahold bought the company.
