= Symbotic =

American warehouse automation company

Symbotic Inc.
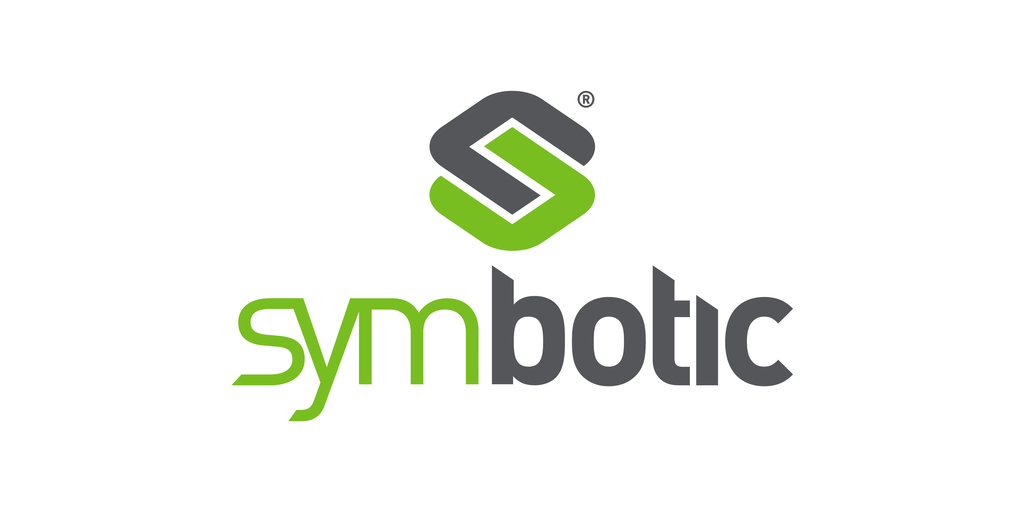
- Type: Public
- Traded as: Nasdaq: SYM (Class A)
- Industry: Robotics; Logistics automation
- Founded: 2007; 19 years ago
- Headquarters: Wilmington, Massachusetts, U.S.
- Key people: Richard B. Cohen (Chairman & CEO)
- Revenue: ▲US$2.25 billion (2025)
- Net income: ▼ −US$16.9 million (2025)
- Number of employees: 1,300 (September 30, 2023)
- Website: symbotic.com

Symbotic Inc. is an American robotics warehouse automation company based in Wilmington, Massachusetts.

The company builds and operates automated warehouse systems for clients in the United States and Canada, using artificial intelligence in its software. The software is used by 1,400 stores, with customers in the grocery, retail and wholesale industries, including C&S Wholesale Grocers, Albertsons, Giant Tiger, Target, and Walmart.

== History ==
The company was founded in 2007 as CasePick Systems. In January 2012, the company was renamed Symbotic.

In 2014, Target adopted Symbotic's technology rather than building a new distribution center in Woodland, California.

In 2017, Symbotic began working with Walmart at their distribution center in Brooksville, Florida, where the company's automated technology was deployed to sort, store, retrieve and pack freight onto pallets. In the same year, the company also began working with Albertsons.

In July 2021, Walmart began introducing Symbotic robots to 25 additional regional distribution centers.

In December 2021, the company announced it was going public through a merger with SVF Investment Corp. 3, a special-purpose acquisition company sponsored by an affiliate of SoftBank Investment Advisers.

== Products and services ==
Symbotic's autonomous robots can travel up to 25 miles per hour, move up and down, and drop off or retrieve one case of products per minute. In contrast with other automation systems, the robots are untethered rather than bolted down or limited to fixed routes.
