= Peter Lawwell =

Scottish football CEO

- Born: Peter Lawwell; 27 May 1959 (age 66); Scotland
- Known for: Chief Executive of Celtic (2003–2021); Chairman of Celtic (2023–2025); Scottish FA Panel Member; ECA Vice-Chair
- Children: 3

Peter Lawwell (born 27 May 1959) is former chairman and chief executive of Scottish football club Celtic. He retired in June 2021 from his role as CEO. He was announced as successor to current Celtic chairman Ian Bankier on 2 December 2022 and took up the role as non-executive chairman on 1 January 2023.

== Career ==
=== Early career ===
Lawwell started his career as a trainee accountant with Babcock Energy in the 1970s. After a career working as an executive for a number of companies, including ICI and Hoffman-LaRoche, Lawwell then went on to hold senior positions in Mining Scotland and Clydeport.

=== Celtic ===
Peter Lawwell was first employed by Celtic as the club's financial controller from 1990 to 1991 under chief executive Terry Cassidy. In September 2003, he returned to Celtic succeeding Ian McLeod as chief executive. The job title was changed for Lawwell to executive director, head of operations as many of the previous chief executives had performed poorly in that role. Arsenal were interested in appointing Lawwell as their chief executive in 2008, but Lawwell rejected their approach. Lawwell has been credited with increasing revenue, reducing debt and is considered a tough transfer negotiator. He has attracted criticism since 2008, as rivals Rangers had won three championships in a row. In particular, Celtic fans cite the club's refusal to increase their offer for Steven Fletcher in January 2009, after which Rangers overhauled Celtic to win the 2008–09 Scottish Premier League championship.

In 2010, it was reported that Lawwell earned a wage of more than £700,000 a year, after receiving a 25% rise from his previous contract for the 2008–09 season. After Celtic failed to win a trophy in the 2009–10, season he apologised to the Celtic fans. Celtic then sold Aiden McGeady for £9.5 million and reinvested the proceeds in new players, including Emilio Izaguirre, Beram Kayal and Gary Hooper.

In July 2011, Lawwell was named as part of the Scottish Football Association's new professional game board which was set up to advise over professional football in Scotland. Celtic won the 2011–12 Scottish Premier League and after this Lawwell spoke of his desire for Celtic to get back to competing regularly in the Champions League. He also praised manager Neil Lennon and the management staff.

In January 2021, it was announced Lawwell would be retiring from his position as chief executive after 17 years. In 2022, it was announced Lawwell would return to Celtic at the start of 2023 replacing the outgoing Ian Bankier as non-executive chairman.

On 17 December 2025, it was announced Lawwell would be standing down at the end of the year, citing "abuse and threats" which he described as "intolerable".

== Personal life ==
In 2010 Lawwell bought a £2.5 million home in Thorntonhall after selling his previous home in Drongan, which he had bought for £850,000, for £1.1 million.

In 2021 Lawwell's home in Thorntonhall was subject to a fire attack after three cars were set alight resulting in Lawwell and his family having to flee their home for safety.
