= KVAT =

KVAT may refer to:

- KVAT Food City, a supermarket chain headquartered in Abingdon, Virginia, United States
- KVAT-LD, a television station (channel 35, virtual 17) licensed to serve Austin, Texas, United States
