= Sweetbay Supermarket =

Defunct American supermarket chain (1947-2014)

- Formerly: Big Barn
- Type: Subsidiary
- Industry: Retail
- Founded: 1947; 79 years ago
- Defunct: April 18, 2014; 12 years ago
- Fate: Acquired by BI-LO
- Headquarters: Tampa, Florida, U.S.
- Products: Grocery
- Parent: Southeastern Grocers

Sweetbay Supermarket was a chain of American supermarkets located in Florida. The first Sweetbay Supermarket to open was in Seminole, Florida, in November 2004. The company's headquarters was located near Tampa, in Hillsborough County, Florida. It was a part of the Belgian Delhaize Group. In May 2013, the chain was purchased by BI-LO. On October 8, 2013, BI-LO announced it was retiring the Sweetbay name and all remaining locations would be re-branded as Winn-Dixie, a process which was completed on April 18, 2014.

== History ==
=== Kash n' Karry ===
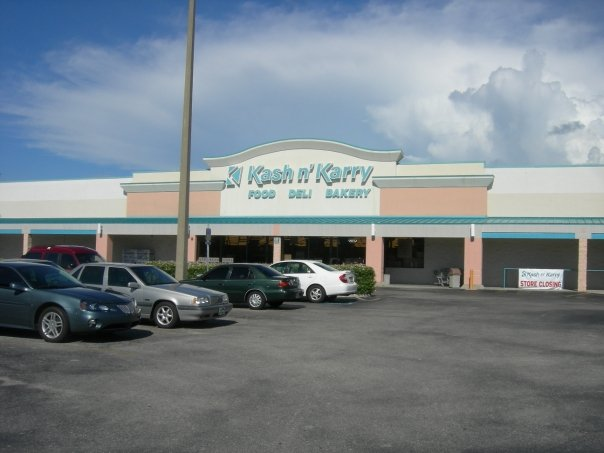
Former Kash n' Karry store in Bradenton, Florida

Salvatore Greco, an Italian immigrant, sold fruits and vegetables in the streets of Tampa beginning in 1914. In 1922, he and his wife Giuseppina opened a storefront at their home. The Greco family built a proper store in 1947 under the name Big Barn in Plant City, Florida.

The business expanded and they had opened nine stores by 1960 under the name Tampa Wholesale. In 1962, the name changed again to Kash n' Karry, based on the cash and carry program of World War II. People would bring in their "cash" and "carry" out their own groceries. By 1970, the chain had grown to 48 stores. By 1973, it expanded into 11 counties, and in 1976, a distribution center was opened in Tampa.

Kash n' Karry was acquired by Lucky Stores of California in 1979. After American Stores acquired Lucky in 1988, it sold Kash n' Karry to leveraged buyout firm Gibbons, Green, and van Amerongen. As the buyout was being completed, Kash n' Karry bought 24 Florida Choice supermarkets from Kroger, who was closing the chain. When Gibbons, Green and van Amerongen dissolved in 1989, Leonard Green & Partners became the controlling stockholder. By 1989 the supermarket had 97 locations, more than 8,200 employees, and annual sales exceeding $900 million.

In 1991, Kash n' Karry began modernizing its stores. It also introduced its Kash n' Karry and Kash Saver private labels. At the end of the year, Leonard Green invested $30 million to take full control of the company. The company filed for bankruptcy in November 1994 and emerged the next month after restructuring its debt.

Kash n' Karry held an IPO in 1995. In December 1996, Kash n' Karry was acquired by Food Lion, the American division of Delhaize Group. In July 1999, Food Lion also acquired Hannaford and a new holding company was created, making Kash n' Karry a wholly owned subsidiary of Delhaize America.

In 2002, Kash n' Karry pulled out of the competitive Orlando market with only two stores remaining in Clermont, 25 miles west of Orlando. In January 2004, it was announced that 34 Kash n' Karry locations would close in order to focus on the West Coast of Florida and free up resources to open and remodel 20 stores. Two of the chain's three stores in Gainesville, Florida were closed during this time.

=== Sweetbay ===
Also in January 2004, Kash n' Karry announced the creation and rollout of a new supermarket concept called Sweetbay Supermarket in its core markets on the West Coast of Florida. The first of the new Sweetbay Supermarkets opened in Seminole, Florida, on November 6, 2004, and in Fort Myers in December 2004. By March 2007, the company announced its intention to rebrand all Kash n' Karry locations as Sweetbay Supermarkets.

Sweetbay was modeled after Delhaize's Hannaford brand, incorporating store design, logo and branding elements, purchasing systems, and pricing strategy from its northeastern sister company. Additionally, Sweetbay stocked Hannaford-branded products as its generic store brand until 2011, when all Delhaize America stores began offering the Healthy Accents brand (for health & beauty items), the Home 360 brand (for home products) and the My Essentials brand (for food products).

On August 29, 2007, the last Kash n' Karry store in Crystal River, Florida, closed, marking the end of the Kash n' Karry brand and the full conversion to Sweetbay Supermarket. The transition to Sweetbay proved to be successful in the first year, however, sales growth plateaued after.

In March 2008, Hannaford Supermarkets announced that a data breach had exposed 4.2 million credit and debit cards to fraudulent misuse. The intrusion also affected Sweetbay stores and certain independently owned retail locations in the Northeast that carried Hannaford products. The company was aware of about 1,800 cases of fraud related to the data intrusion. In August, Sweetbay became the official supermarket of the Tampa Bay Rays baseball club.

In January 2013, Sweetbay announced that 33 stores would close, leaving the chain with 72 locations. The closings were attributed to competition from regional grocery chain Publix and national chain Walmart. The closings included the two remaining stores in Clermont, ending the company's presence in the Orlando market.

In May 2013, Sweetbay and its sister supermarket chains Harveys and Reid's were sold to BI-LO LLC for $265 million. Included in the transaction were 72 Sweetbay stores and the leases to 10 Sweetbay locations that closed in January 2013.

On October 8, 2013, BI-LO announced it would retire the Sweetbay brand, and rename all Sweetbay locations to Winn-Dixie. The following month, it was announced that the Tampa headquarters would permanently close and 346 employees were laid off. The final Sweetbay locations were re-branded to Winn-Dixie by April 18, 2014.
