= Richard B. Cohen =

American businessman (born 1952)

Rick Cohen
- Born: 1952 (age 73–74)
- Education: University of Pennsylvania (BS)
- Known for: Owner of C&S Wholesale Grocers
- Title: Chairman and Chief Product Officer of Symbotic
- Spouse: Jan Cohen
- Children: 3

Richard B. "Rick" Cohen (born 1952) is an American businessman. He is the majority owner, chairman, and chief executive officer of Symbotic, an artificial intelligence-enabled robotics and warehouse automation company based in Wilmington, Massachusetts & owner of C&S Wholesale Grocers (C&S), a wholesale grocery supply company based in Keene, New Hampshire.

== Early life and education ==
Richard Cohen was born in Worcester, Massachusetts, in 1952 to Norma and Lester Cohen. In 1970, he graduated from the Deerfield Academy in Deerfield, Massachusetts and then in 1974, he graduated from the Wharton School of the University of Pennsylvania with a degree economics, concentrating in accounting.

== Career ==
In 1974, Cohen began working at the family company, C&S Wholesalers in Worcester, Massachusetts, which was co-founded by his grandfather, Israel Cohen, in 1918. After a three-week union strike that nearly shuttered the business, he persuaded his father to move the company to Brattleboro, Vermont.

In 1989, Cohen took control of C&S after his father retired and in 2003, he moved the company headquarters to Keene, New Hampshire. As the food distribution business is very low margin and customer retention is critical, C&S has been able to attain efficiencies - less than 2 percent of the orders processed have errors or omissions - by using performance incentives combined with self-managed teams of workers who are responsible for assembling customer orders thereby eliminating costly supervisors.

Cohen is also the founder of Symbotic, a robotics warehouse automation company. As of 2021 Symbotic's artificial intelligence-enabled platform was used by C&S, Walmart, Target, Albertsons, and other large retailers.

In December 2021, Symbotic announced plans to go public through a merger with a SPAC sponsored by SoftBank in order to accelerate its push into warehouse automation.

== Philanthropy ==
In 2001, The Center for Holocaust and Genocide Studies at Keene State College was renamed after the Cohens in thanks of their financial support.

== Personal life ==
Cohen is married to Jan Cohen, executive producer of the Kaddish Project, a musical oratorio on genocide; the couple have three children.
