= Promodès =

French group of retail companies

- Company type: S.A
- Industry: Hypermarket; Supermarket
- Founded: 1961, France
- Divisions: Continent; Champion; Shopi; Dia

Promodès is a former French group of retailers. It was owned up to 56% by the Halley family. Paul-Auguste Halley, which was a simple grocer in the Manche in the 1950s, had the idea of importing the concept of supermarkets to France.

With his two sons, Paul-Louis and Robert, he founded the group Promodis (later renamed Promodès) in 1961 in Caen (Calvados) by combining several Norman families of wholesalers: Halley, Duval-Lemonnier and Marette.

From the 1960s, the group grows rapidly in Europe and internationally in Belgium in 1969, Spain in 1973, Brazil in 1975, and the United States (Red Food) in 1979.

== Merger with Carrefour ==
In 1999, Paul-Louis Halley announced the merger between Promodes and Carrefour making the biggest retail group in Europe and the second in the world after Wal-Mart.

After an exchange of shares, the Halley family became the largest shareholder in the new group with a 13% stake in Groupe Carrefour.
