= SaveRite =

American grocery store chain

- Company type: Division
- Industry: Grocery retail
- Founded: October 2000
- Defunct: 2011
- Parent: Winn-Dixie

SaveRite was a U.S. chain of discount warehouse-style grocery stores owned by Winn-Dixie. The store offered a smaller selection and less customer support than most grocery stores.

SaveRite was designed to offer lower prices on a smaller selection of food by offering items in bulk, eliminating baggers and carry-out services, and removing many in-store services. The stores also had offerings that catered to their local markets, with some providing more services than others.

The chain's marketing was based on its mascot Captain SaveRite, who is shown as a cartoon super-hero resembling Captain America.

== History ==
Winn-Dixie created the SaveRite brand as an experiment, with the first location opening in Orlando, Florida in October 2000. In March 2001, the nine Gooding's stores based in Orlando, Florida that the company had acquired the year prior were converted to the SaveRite banner. In November, Winn-Dixie announced plans to convert nearly all of its Winn-Dixie and Winn-Dixie Marketplace brand stores in the metro Atlanta area into SaveRite locations in an effort to keep a hold on its market share, which was rapidly declining due to stiff competition from Wal-Mart, Publix, Kroger, Food Lion, and Target. The conversions began in earnest in 2002, with the company looking to fill the void left when Cub Foods left the area.

By 2003, the company had converted 43 locations in Atlanta, nine sites in Florida, and eight locations in Mississippi to the SaveRite banner. In June 2004, SaveRite opened a 55,000-square-foot store in Melbourne, Florida, offering a pharmacy, deli, full-service bakery, expanded produce and meat departments, a customer service booth, and extensive Hispanic and Caribbean foods selections.

However, when Winn-Dixie filed for bankruptcy in February 2005, the company announced that more than 300 stores, including SaveRite locations, would close. As part of these cuts, it was announced that SaveRite would exit the Atlanta area. By July, SuperValu was seeking to acquire 27 of the 40 SaveRite supermarkets in the Atlanta market.

Winn-Dixie began redesigning its SaveRite stores by cutting prices and adding in-store services. The first store opened in January 2009. By this time, there were three Save-Rite locations in Jacksonville, five in Orlando, and three in Mississippi. A second redesigned store opened in March 2010.

On August 18, 2011, Winn Dixie announced it was discontinuing the SaveRite name and converting its six remaining stores to the Winn-Dixie banner, while a seventh store was closed.
