= Reid's =

Store chain in South Carolina, US

- Company type: Grocery Store
- Industry: Retail
- Founded: 1972
- Founder: Reid Boylston
- Defunct: 2013
- Headquarters: Barnwell, South Carolina, U.S.
- Products: Grocery
- Parent: Southeastern Grocers
- Website: reidsgroceries.com

Reid's was an 11-store chain located in various rural South Carolina communities, specifically Barnwell, Orangeburg, Langley, New Ellenton, Batesburg, Walterboro, St. George, Aiken, Saluda, Cayce, and Hampton. Most of these stores were all former Food Lion stores and carried Food Lion branded goods and used the Food Lion infrastructure.

The common theme to these stores appeared to be that they were all older stores which Food Lion had apparently determined were located in markets small enough to make enlarging or opening a new store unprofitable. But, by operating under a different brand name to differentiate them from Food Lion, prices and selection could be different from a standard Food Lion store and can still be profitably run without remodeling. Some exceptions to this standard were the Langley location, which was located in a former Food Lion, and the Hampton, South Carolina location which was in a former BI-LO.

Reid's advertised mainly via newspaper ads with occasional television ads when a new store opened. Reid's also ran sale advertisements on several radio stations in South Carolina, featuring the chain's namesake, Reid Boylston, reading the week's specials over the phone and closing with an exuberant recitation of the chain's slogan, "We can save you money!"

In May 2013, the Delhaize Group sold Reid's along with its sister supermarket chains Harveys and Sweetbay to BI-LO LLC for $265 million. BI-LO subsequently retired the Reid's name, rebranding the Reid's stores as BI-LO. However, one Reid's store in Hampton, South Carolina was sold to Food Lion, due to the close proximity of an existing BI-LO in the area.
