= Paul-Louis Halley =

French businessman (1934–2003)

- Born: 16 September 1934; Cherbourg, France
- Died: 6 December 2003 (aged 69); Kidlington, England
- Occupation: Businessman

Paul-Louis Halley (French pronunciation: [pɔl lwi alɛ]; 16 September 1934 – 6 December 2003) was a French businessman who co-founded the retail company Promodès, which later merged with Carrefour. Much of his fortune came from his 11% stakeholding in Carrefour. He was estimated to have a fortune of £2.2bn, putting him at 104th on the Forbes World's Richest People list in 2003. He died in a plane crash in 2003.

Paul-Louis Halley founded the retail company Promodès in 1961, along with his father and brother. The company merged with Carrefour in 1999, with Halley as the principal shareholder.

== Death ==
He was killed in a Socata TBM 700 aircraft crash on 6 December 2003, during an approach to Oxford Airport. The plane went into an uncontrolled roll, killing Halley, his wife, and the pilot. The Air Accidents Investigation Branch could find no cause for the crash. There were no technical problems with the plane, and investigators could only speculate that the pilot was distracted by a bird as he tried to land.

The inquest into the death of Paul-Louis Halley took place in Oxford, England, in late October 2005. A jury returned a verdict of accidental death.
