= Associated Wholesalers =

Retailers cooperative

Associated Wholesalers, Inc.
- Company type: Retailers' cooperative
- Industry: Food Distribution
- Founded: 1962
- Fate: Acquired by C&S Wholesale Grocers
- Headquarters: Robesonia, Pennsylvania
- Key people: Matthew Saunders, President and CEO; Joyce Fasula., Chairman; David Lieb, VP, Finance
- Revenue: $1.100 Billion USD (2008)
- Number of employees: 2,100 (2008)
- Website: Associated Wholesalers, Inc. web site

Associated Wholesalers, Inc. was a retailers' cooperative based in Robesonia, Pennsylvania. It distributed food to member owners who are independent supermarkets. It owns the Shurfine Markets supermarket chain in Pennsylvania.

Associated Wholesalers, Inc. was one of the cooperative wholesalers which own the Retailer Owned Research Company (RORC) of Fort Worth, Texas. RORC technology was used in AWI owned Shurfine Markets.

Associated Wholesalers, Inc. filed for Chapter 11 bankruptcy protection on Sunday September 7, 2014. It was acquired by C&S Wholesale Grocers.
