= The Winn-Dixie Company =

American supermarket company

- Formerly: Southeastern Grocers, Bi-Lo Holdings
- Type: Private
- Industry: Retail (Grocery)
- Founded: 2013 (13 years ago)
- Headquarters: Jacksonville, Florida, United States
- Number of locations: 298
- Area served: Florida, Georgia
- Key people: Anthony Hucker (Chairman, President & CEO)
- Products: Bakery, dairy, deli, frozen foods, general grocery, meat, produce, seafood, snacks, liquor
- Subsidiaries: Winn-Dixie
- Website: www.winndixie.com/about

The Winn-Dixie Company (formerly Southeastern Grocers and Bi-Lo Holdings) is an American supermarket portfolio headquartered in Jacksonville, Florida. The portfolio was created by Lone Star Funds in September 2013 as the new parent company for BI-LO, Harveys, and Winn-Dixie, later to include Fresco y Más.

Southeastern Grocers was rated No. 31 in the Forbes 2015 ranking of America's Largest Private Companies.

== History ==
=== BI-LO Holdings under Lone Star Funds ===
In December 2004, private equity firm Lone Star Funds acquired BI-LO Holdings, which included the BI-LO and Bruno's supermarket chains, from Ahold. In March 2007, Lone Star spun off Bruno's, Food World, and Food Max stores from BI-LO.

By March 2009, BI-LO had filed for chapter 11 bankruptcy. Lone Star provided a $350 million cash infusion and it managed to emerge from bankruptcy in May 2010.

On December 19, 2011, it was announced that BI-LO and Winn-Dixie would merge to create an organization of 690 grocery stores and 63,000 employees in eight states throughout the southeastern United States. BI-LO purchased Winn-Dixie for $560 million, and operated Winn-Dixie as a subsidiary. The merged company was based at Winn-Dixie's former headquarters in Jacksonville, Florida.

On May 28, 2013, it was announced that BI-LO was acquiring the Harveys, Sweetbay, and Reid's banners from Delhaize Group for $265 million. Upon completion of the transaction, BI-LO rebranded all Sweetbay stores as Winn-Dixie stores, and all Reid's stores as BI-LO stores, while keeping the Harveys name for those stores.

=== Reorganization as Southeastern Grocers ===
In September 2013, Southeastern Grocers was created by Lone Star Funds as the new parent company for BI-LO, Harveys, and Winn-Dixie. The new parent company then filed to raise as much as $500 million in a U.S. initial public offering and list its common stock under the "SEG" symbol.

In September 2013, Southeastern Grocers announced an agreement to buy 22 supermarkets in South Carolina and Georgia from the Piggly Wiggly Carolina Co. One Piggly Wiggly store in Lexington, South Carolina, was closed due to close proximity to other BI-LO stores. It also entered into an agreement to sell seven BI-LO branded stores in the Charlotte market to Publix: the stores were located in Charlotte, NC, Huntersville, NC, Matthews, NC, Lake Wylie, SC, and Rock Hill, SC.

On August 19, 2014, Southeastern Grocers withdrew its IPO filing with the SEC, aborting the process of listing the stock for public sale.

In July 2015, Southeastern Grocers announced the sale of its 21 BI-LO locations in the Chattanooga, Tennessee, market as well as eight BI-LO locations in Northern Georgia to K-VA-T Food Stores, which would rebrand the stores under its Food City banner. Southeastern Grocers would likely use proceeds from the deal to reduce debt. That effectively ended Southeastern Grocers' presence in the Tennessee market.

In October 2015, Southeastern Grocers laid off 250 workers at its support offices in a move said to improve efficiency and invest in service and value for customers. The cuts took place at Southeastern's Jacksonville, Florida headquarters and regional support centers. Store employees were not affected.

In June 2016, Southeastern Grocers converted a Winn-Dixie location in Hialeah, Florida to Fresco y Más, its new brand that features an expanded Hispanic product assortment, a full-service Latin butcher shop, and Cocina. In December 2016, an additional five Winn-Dixie locations in Miami-Dade and Palm Beach counties were converted to the Fresco y Más banner. In March 2017, Southeastern converted another five Winn-Dixie locations throughout Miami and Hialeah to the Fresco y Más brand. In celebration of Fresco y Más' first anniversary in June 2017, another seven Winn-Dixie locations were converted in Miami, Hialeah, and Hollywood, including the banner's first Broward County store, to bring the total number of Fresco y Más supermarkets to 18.

In May 2017, Southeastern Grocers announced the closing of 23 locations along with the elimination of some department lead roles at stores.

In June 2017, Southeastern announced that President and CEO Ian McLeod was leaving the company. On August 10, 2017, Southeastern Grocers announced that it had appointed Anthony Hucker as president and CEO, effective immediately. Anthony, who joined Southeastern Grocers in February 2016, had served as Interim President and CEO since July 1, 2017, following McLeod's departure.

=== 2018 bankruptcy ===
In February 2018, it was announced that Southeastern Grocers was selling eight Winn-Dixie locations in south Louisiana to Texas-based Brookshire Grocery Company as well as an additional three Mississippi and four New Orleans market locations to Baton Rouge-based Shoppers Value Foods.

On March 15, 2018, Southeastern Grocers announced they would file a plan of reorganization under Chapter 11 by the end of March. According to the company, the restructuring would decrease overall debt levels by over $500 million. Under this plan, 94 stores across the BI-LO, Fresco y Más, Harveys, and Winn-Dixie brands would close.

On March 28, 2018, Southeastern Grocers agreed to sell three BI-LO locations in South Carolina along with three Harveys locations in Georgia to three independent Piggly Wiggly store owners. Another three Winn-Dixie stores in northeast Alabama were sold to wholesaler Mitchell Grocery Corp on behalf of two of its current customers, Johnson's Giant Foods and The D'Alessandro Organization LLC, while the Winn-Dixie in Atmore, Alabama, was acquired by Ramey's. The deals are in conjunction with the restructuring support agreement revealed by Southeastern Grocers.

On April 27, 2018, Food Lion announced plans to acquire four South Carolina BI-LO locations in Florence, Myrtle Beach, Surfside Beach, and Columbia. The week of April 30, Publix announced it would acquire the lease, fixtures, equipment, permits, and licenses for the Seneca, South Carolina BI-LO location that was slated to close, while an independent Piggly Wiggly operator announced that they would reopen the Montgomery, Alabama Winn-Dixie location that closed. Both locations were part of the original restructuring plan to close 94 stores. Two of the BI-LO locations originally closed as part of the bankruptcy reorganization in April 2018, Ladson and Mullins, South Carolina, were acquired by another independent Piggly Wiggly owner and would be reopened in June 2018.

In May 2018, Southeastern Grocers restructuring plan was confirmed by a U.S. Bankruptcy judge in Delaware. At the end of that month, Southeastern Grocers announced that it had completed its financial restructuring and was emerging from bankruptcy. As part of the restructuring, $522 million in debt was exchanged for equity in Southeastern Grocers, though it was not announced who was receiving the equity shares. Southeastern Grocers exited bankruptcy with 575 stores in seven states, down from 704 locations. They also announced a planned remodels of 100 stores in 2018.

In February 2019, Southeastern Grocers announced plans to shutter 22 locations in Florida, Georgia, North Carolina and South Carolina. This round of closures included 13 BI-LO locations, 7 Winn-Dixie locations and 2 Harveys Supermarkets.

=== Elimination of the BI-LO banner ===
On June 9, 2020, Southeastern Grocers announced the decision to no longer operate stores under the BI-LO banner. As part of an effort to reach that goal, Southeastern Grocers sold 62 stores, including 46 BI-LO and 16 Harveys Supermarkets, to Ahold Delhaize, the successor to the company that previously owned the brand. As part of the agreement, the Mauldin, South Carolina distribution center was handed over to Ahold Delhaize USA Distribution, LLC. The stores would transition to Food Lion branded locations in the first half of 2021.

In addition Southeastern Grocers announced it would divest the assets of 57 of the in-store pharmacies it operated under the BI-LO and Harveys Supermarket banners to CVS Pharmacy and Walgreens. These locations included all of the company's BI-LO pharmacies and nine Harveys Supermarket pharmacies in Georgia. The transition was expected to begin within two weeks of the press release date.

On September 1, 2020, it was announced that Southeastern Grocers was selling 20 BI-LO stores in South Carolina and Georgia to Alex Lee, Inc who would rebrand the stores as KJ'S Market IGA and Lowes Foods. In the same announcement, 2 additional BI-LO and one Harvey's Supermarket location in South Carolina would be sold to independent operator B&T Foods. Following the sale, BI-LO will have 39 stores remaining in Georgia, North Carolina and South Carolina. That month, the company announced it had made a regulatory filing with the SEC ahead of a potential IPO.

On December 21, 2020, two independent Piggly Wiggly owners, with support from C&S Wholesale Grocers, announced plans to acquire one BI-LO supermarket in South Carolina and another in Georgia from Southeastern Grocers. Both locations were previously Piggly Wiggly stores that were acquired by SEG in 2013.

The stores that were not sold to any other operators were closed on or by April 18, 2021, ending the 60-year run of the BI-LO banner.

In January 2021, Ahold Delhaize purchased additional stores in North Carolina and South Carolina that were scheduled to close, acquiring. The company also announced the launch of its IPO that month, but called it off a week later.

=== Sale to Aldi ===
On August 16, 2023, the company announced its intention to sell all Winn-Dixie and Harveys stores to German supermarket chain Aldi, and all locations will either remain open under their respective brands or convert into the ALDI brand. SEG also agreed to sell its Fresco y Más operations, including all 28 stores and four pharmacies, to Fresco Retail Group LLC. The deal was completed in March 2024 and the first 50 stores will be converted during the summer. A “significant number” of Winn-Dixie and Harveys Supermarkets will be converted into Aldi stores in the next several years.

=== Buyback from Aldi ===
On February 7, 2025, the company announced that a consortium of private investors, that is being spearheaded by the current CEO and President of Southeastern Grocers Inc. (SEG), Anthony Hucker, as well as C&S Wholesale Grocers have acquired approximately 170 stores from ALDI U.S. The agreement includes the acquisition of SEG grocery and liquor store operations under the Winn-Dixie and Harveys Supermarket banners, which includes approximately 170 grocery stores in Alabama, Georgia, Louisiana, Mississippi and Florida, as well as the existing Winn-Dixie liquor store business. Aldi still intends to complete its previously started conversion plans of 220 Winn-Dixie and Harveys Supermarket stores to the ALDI format over a multi-year conversion process, which started in March 2024, and is expected to conclude in 2027. Both Aldi and SEG leadership will continue to work together closely to ensure there is a smooth transition, with dedicated leaders both overseeing the store conversion and hiring processes. SEG will continue to operate the remaining stores that have been identified for conversion in the normal course of business, with the same level of care and a focus on quality and service up until each store is closed to be converted.

=== The Winn-Dixie Company ===
In October 2025, it was announced that Southeastern Grocers would change its name to The Winn-Dixie Company starting in early 2026, in an effort to renew its focus on its home state of Florida and to also expand its Own Brand product assortment. As part of the announcement, the company has stated intentions to exit markets outside of Florida and southern Georgia. Dozens of remodels, as well as new store projects are planned and are already underway, with upgrades that are designed to create community-centered stores that reflect the needs of local customers. Southeastern Grocers will also be piloting new customer conveniences and partnerships, that will include third-party online grocery delivery and return kiosks.

== Store locations ==

- Winn Dixie (Florida, South Georgia
- Fresco y Más (Formerly) (Florida)
