= Piggly Wiggly Carolina Co. =

American supermarket chain

- Company type: Subsidiary
- Industry: Grocery store
- Founded: 1947
- Defunct: 2014
- Headquarters: Charleston, South Carolina
- Number of locations: 2 Corporate Stores / 46 Independent Stores
- Area served: South Carolina, Coastal Georgia
- Parent: C&S Wholesale Grocers
- Website: thepig.net

Piggly Wiggly Carolina Co. was a franchise of the Piggly Wiggly chain of supermarkets, based in South Carolina in the United States. The company entered a process of disposal of assets and dissolution in 2014.

== History ==
Piggly Wiggly Wholesale was founded by Joseph T. Newton Jr. in 1947 when he purchased a Piggly Wiggly Franchise from the Piggly Wiggly Corporation. In 1958, Joe Newton’s son-in-law, Burt Schools, joined the business followed by Joe’s son, Joseph T. "Buzzy" Newton, III in 1962. Originally based in downtown Charleston, South Carolina, the company moved the main warehouse to North Charleston, South Carolina in 1959. In the decade that followed, Newton evolved the company from a being strictly a wholesaler operation to become a wholesaler to independent store owners and a supplier of the company's own retail stores. With the addition of thirty stores from Columbia-based Piggly Wiggly Carolina, the company changed its name to Piggly Wiggly Carolina Co. Under Joe Newton’s guidance and leadership, Piggly Wiggly Carolina, and the name Piggly Wiggly, soon became household names, known for its national brands, fair prices, and friendly service.

In 1979, Joe Newton retired and became chairman of the board, and his son, Buzzy Newton, was named the president of Piggly Wiggly Carolina Company. In 1997, Joe Newton died and Burt Schools retired from the company to become chairman of the board.

In 1999, construction was completed on two large projects, a new corporate office building at Albemarle Point Center and a 612,000 sq. ft. distribution center in Berkeley County.

In 2005, the company became 100% employee owned and was the largest employee-owned, privately operated retail company in South Carolina, servicing over 100 retail stores with annual sales over $800 million and a workforce of over 6,000 employee-owners throughout South Carolina and southeastern Georgia.

In April 2007, after 45 years with Piggly Wiggly, Buzzy Newton retired as president and became chairman of the board. Upon Newton’s retirement, David R. Schools, Burt Schools’ son and Buzzy Newton’s nephew, was named president of Piggly Wiggly Carolina Company.

In September 2013, it was announced that Piggly Wiggly Carolina would sell 29 of its stores to BI-LO and Harris Teeter; all but abandoning the Charleston, South Carolina and Savannah, Georgia markets. The company initiated the acquisition discussions as a means of addressing the debt incurred as a result of its recent ESOP conversion along with increasing competition, particularly around Charleston. In November of the same year, the company announced that they were shutting down their distribution centers in North Charleston and Jedburg, South Carolina. Going forward, the company's 32 remaining corporate stores and its 28 franchised locations would be supplied by C&S Wholesale Grocers' warehouse in Greenville, South Carolina.

In October 2014, Piggly Wiggly Carolina announced it was seeking approval from shareholders to approve the sale of its retail and wholesale grocery businesses by the end of 2014 and to dissolve the company entirely within the following three years. C&S Wholesale Grocers would acquire the operations, which included branding, marketing, store support, accounting and IT services, and Piggly Wiggly's Greenbax customer loyalty program for $9.3 million. The 20 remaining corporately owned stores would to be sold to independent operators while another 30 Piggly Wiggly stores that were independently operated were expected to remain under their current ownership. Proceeds from the sales would be used for participants in the company's employee stock ownership plan who would receive an estimated $55 per share. Also, an undisclosed number of senior executives would be paid a total of $700,000 to be split among them if they agree not to work for a competing business for at least four years.

== Greenbax Enterprises ==
Greenbax Enterprises began as a sister corporation to Piggly Wiggly Carolina Company in the 1950s. Greenbax trading stamps are given with purchases, and these can be cashed in for discounts on groceries and merchandise that advertises the store. Greenbax discontinued the traditional paper stamps and began recording each customer’s balance electronically on the Pig's Favorite Customer (PFC) card. Shoppers can electronically redeem Greenbax at Piggly Wiggly stores, the Greenbax Online Catalog, or at other partner business locations.

== See also ==
- Supermarkets in the United States
