= Ian McLeod (businessman) =

Scottish businessman and sports administrator

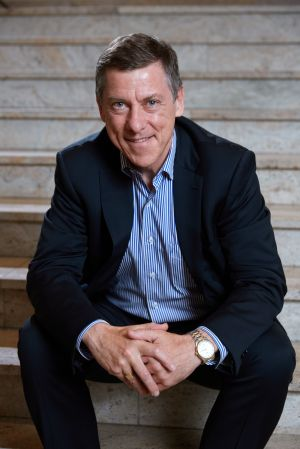
- Ian McLeod in 2016
- Born: Scotland
- Occupation: former CEO of DFI Retail Group

Ian McLeod is a Scottish businessman and sports administrator, who is formerly chief executive officer of DFI Retail Group. McLeod was a board member of the Fulham, Melbourne Victory and St Kilda football clubs, and was CEO of The Celtic Football Club in his native Scotland. McLeod is most known for his tenure as managing director of Coles Group, an Australian retail chain, between 2008 and 2014. He is credited with doubling the company's profits and returning it to profitability.

Ian was CEO of Southeastern Grocers between 2015 and 2017. His resignation was announced from Southeastern Grocers in June 2017, and he began his new role as CEO of Dairy Farm International Holdings (currently known as DFI Retail Group) in July 2017. He stepped down in 2023.

In May 2014, McLeod publicly supported the idea of Gillon McLachlan becoming chief executive officer of the Australian Football League.

McLeod attended the Advanced Management Program at Harvard Business School in 1999.
