= Harveys Supermarkets =

American supermarket chain owned by The Winn-Dixie Company

J.M. Harvey Co., LLC
- Final logo, adopted 2015

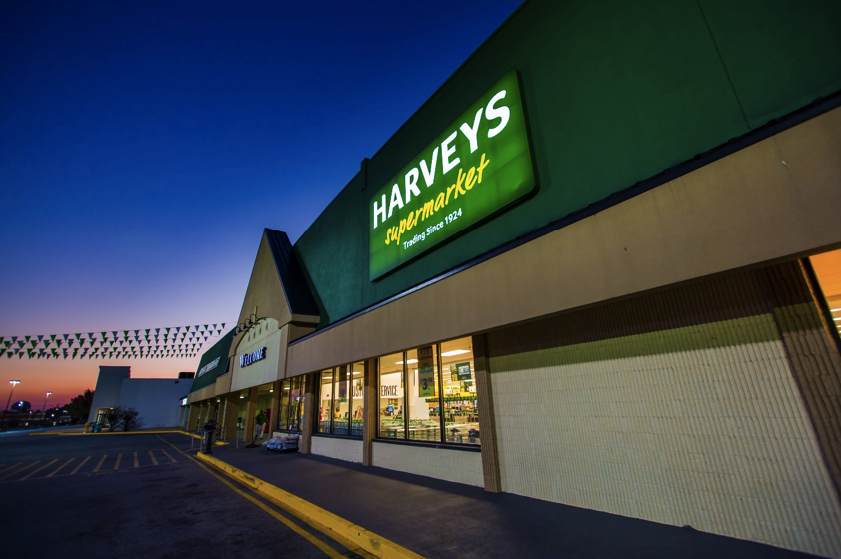
- Trade name: Harveys Supermarkets
- Type: Subsidiary
- Industry: Retail (Grocery)
- Founded: 1924 (102 years ago) in Nashville, Georgia, U.S.
- Founders: J. M. Harvey; Ellie Harvey
- Defunct: June 10, 2026; 4 months ago
- Fate: Stores converted to Winn-Dixie
- Headquarters: Jacksonville, Florida, United States
- Areas served: Florida; Georgia
- Key people: Anthony Hucker, Chairman, President & CEO
- Products: Bakery, delicatessen, dairy, grocery, frozen foods, organic foods, bulk foods, meat, produce, seafood, wine, beer, spirits, floral products, pet supplies, general merchandise
- Parent: The Winn-Dixie Company
- Website: harveyssupermarkets.com at the Wayback Machine (archived June 14, 2026)

Harveys Supermarkets was an American supermarket chain operating in the Southeastern United States, established in Georgia in 1924.

After several transfers in ownership, the chain was effectively dissolved by parent The Winn-Dixie Company, who converted the remaining outlets to Winn-Dixie stores by the end of May 2026.

Previous logo

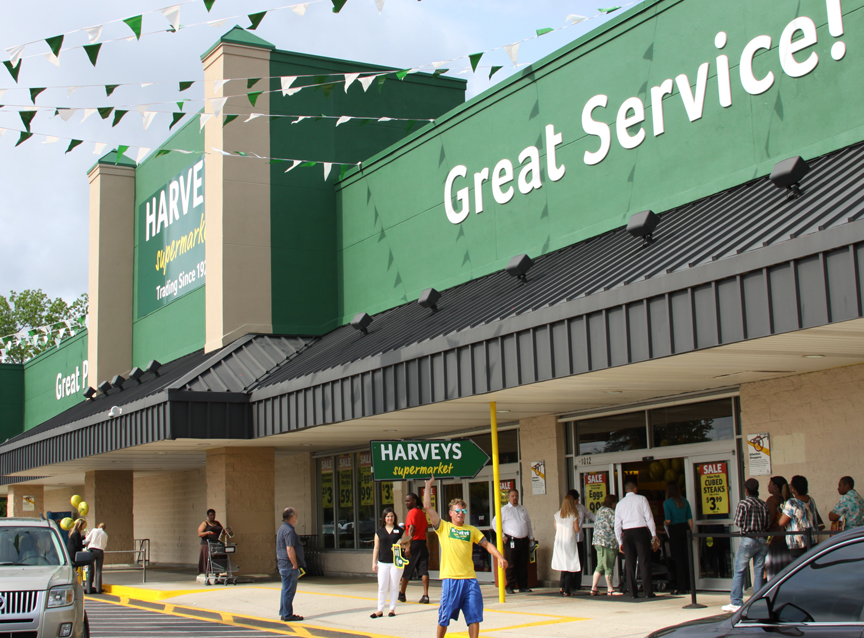
Exterior of a Harveys store in Jacksonville, Florida.

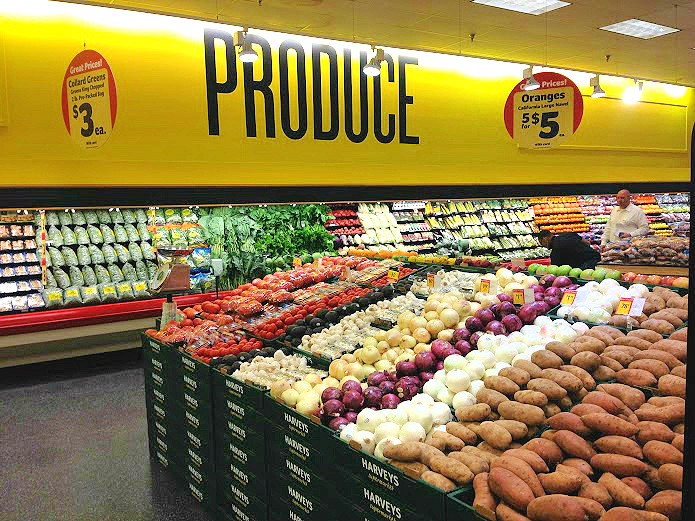

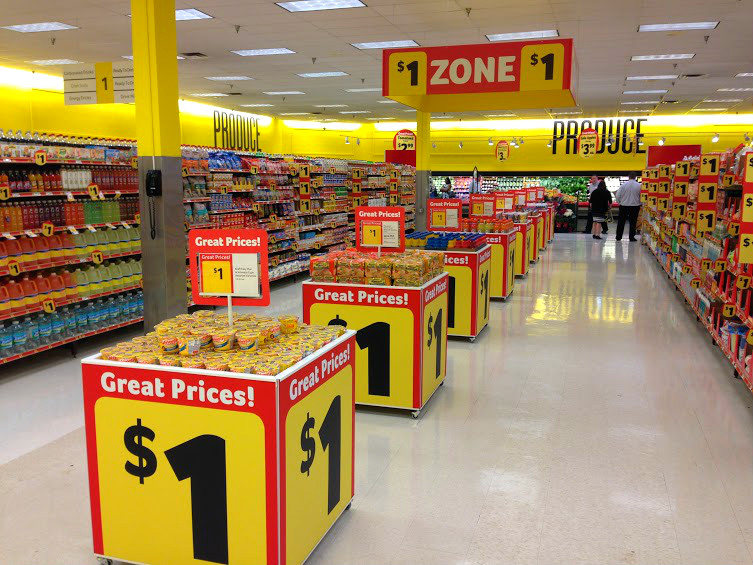

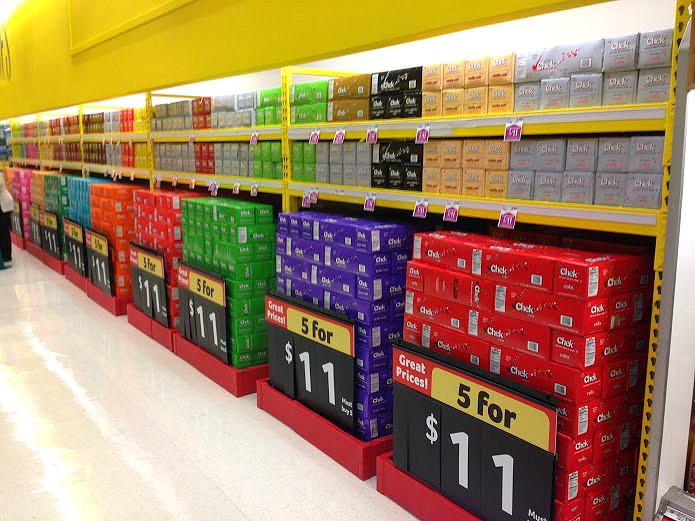

== History ==
The chain was founded in 1924 by Joseph Hillman "J. H." Harvey (1902–1980) and his wife Ellie Byrd Harvey (née Peeples, 1904–1979) in Nashville, Georgia. Their son, Joseph Hillman "Joe" Harvey, Jr. (1929–2005), took over the chain in 1950. Originally only serving south Georgia, the chain expanded to Florida with the opening of a store in Tallahassee in July 1987. Harveys' steady growth during the 1990s was primarily through acquisitions, and had grown from a total of 22 stores in 1981 to 43 stores in 2003.

=== Acquisition By Delhaize ===
In 2003, Delhaize Group acquired the then 43-store strong Harveys chain for $26.1 million. After the acquisition, Harveys and its sister chain, Food Lion, combined operations to create several synergies. First, over a dozen Food Lion stores were converted into Harveys locations. Food Lion also took over all procurement, supply chain, and back-office functions. Finally, while Harveys management remained headquartered in Nashville, Georgia, they now reported directly to Food Lion management in Salisbury, North Carolina.

In May 2006, Harveys announced they would close their warehouse and distribution center in Nashville, Georgia, to trim costs and enhance the resources of Food Lion, affecting about 200 employees in the process. Food Lion would support Harveys stores through their own distribution centers in South Carolina and Florida.

=== Acquisition By BI-LO Holdings, LLC/Southeastern Grocers ===
In May 2013, Harveys was sold along with sister supermarket chains Sweetbay and Reid's to BI-LO Holdings, LLC for $265 million. In September 2013, Southeastern Grocers was created by Lone Star Funds as the new parent company for BI-LO, Harveys, and Winn-Dixie. The new parent company then filed to raise as much as $500 million in a U.S. initial public offering. On August 19, 2014, Southeastern Grocers withdrew their IPO filing with the SEC, aborting the process of listing the stock for public sale.

The Harveys brand continued to adjust under the Southeastern Grocers watch. In June 2014, soon after the acquisition of the former Delhaize stores was complete, three Winn-Dixie stores in the Albany, Georgia, area were converted to the Harveys banner. At the same time, seven Harveys stores in Georgia were converted over to the Winn-Dixie banner. These stores converted included three in Brunswick, two in Valdosta and one in Saint Marys.

In May 2016, Southeastern unveiled its new Harveys Supermarket store concept at a former Winn-Dixie location in Jacksonville, Florida. Two months later, Southeastern Grocers rebranded an existing BI-LO location in Charlotte, North Carolina, to the Harveys banner. This became the first North Carolina location for the Harveys brand.

In November 2016, Southeastern Grocers continued the Harveys expansion by converting 16 Winn-Dixie and BI-LO stores to the Harveys Supermarket banner. These included two BI-LO locations in Augusta, Georgia, two additional Charlotte, North Carolina, BI-LO locations, three BI-LO locations in Columbia, South Carolina, and a BI-LO location in Greenwood, South Carolina. An additional seven Winn-Dixie Florida locations were converted with six of them in Jacksonville. Fifty-five other Harveys locations, mainly in Georgia, were upgraded at the same time.

In May 2017, Southeastern Grocers announced the closing of a Harveys store in Albany, Georgia, as part of a corporate-wide closure of 23 locations along with the elimination of some department lead roles at stores.

In July 2017, it was announced that Southeastern Grocers would debut the Harveys brand in the Central and West Florida markets with the conversion of 7 Winn-Dixie stores with the conversions taking place in early August. In October, Southeastern announced that three more West Florida Winn-Dixie stores would be converted to the Harveys brand in November, growing their store count to 80.

=== 2018 bankruptcy ===
On March 15, 2018, Southeastern Grocers announced they would file a plan of reorganization under Chapter 11 by the end of March. According to the company, the restructuring would decrease overall debt levels by over $500 million. Under this plan, 94 stores across the BI-LO, Fresco y Más, Harveys, and Winn-Dixie brands would close.

On March 28, 2018, Southeastern agreed to sell three BI-LO locations in South Carolina along with three Harveys locations in Georgia to three independent Piggly Wiggly store owners. The deals are in conjunction with the restructuring support agreement revealed by Southeastern Grocers.

In May 2018, Southeastern Grocers restructuring plan was confirmed by a U.S. Bankruptcy judge in Delaware. At the end of that month, Southeastern Grocers announced that it had completed its financial restructuring and was emerging from bankruptcy. As part of the restructuring, $522 million in debt was exchanged for equity in Southeastern Grocers, though it was not announced who was receiving the equity shares. Southeastern Grocers exited bankruptcy with 575 stores in seven states, down from 704 locations. They also announced a planned remodels of 100 stores in 2018.

In February 2019, Southeastern announced plans to shut down 22 units, including two Harveys locations in Florida and South Carolina.

On June 9, 2020, Southeastern Grocers sold 16 Harveys Supermarkets, along with 46 BI-LO locations, to Ahold Delhaize subsidiary Food Lion; the deal also included transitioning BI-LO's Mauldin, South Carolina, distribution center over to Ahold Delhaize USA Distribution, LLC. Both of these closed in the first half of 2021, at which point over 60 stores began to transition to the Food Lion banner.

In 2023, expecting to conclude the deal the following year, Aldi announced that it would buy the chain and maintain its units under the Harveys or Aldi banners.

In March 2024, it was reported that Aldi had completed its purchase of Harveys Supermarkets.

On February 7, 2025, a consortium of private investors, spearheaded by the current CEO and President of Southeastern Grocers Inc. (SEG), Anthony Hucker, and C&S Wholesale Grocers, announced it had acquired Southeastern Grocers and its Winn-Dixie and Harveys Supermarket banners from ALDI U.S.

Due to The Winn-Dixie Company's consolidation efforts, Harveys Supermarkets effectively ceased operations after 102 years in business on June 10, 2026, with the final store, located in Jacksonville, Florida, adopting the Winn-Dixie banner. Its website would remain live until becoming a redirect to Winn-Dixie's within the same week.
