= Food City (K-VA-T) =

American supermarket chain

- Company type: Supermarket
- Industry: Retail
- Founded: 1955; 71 years ago
- Headquarters: Abingdon, Virginia
- Number of locations: 153
- Area served: Alabama, Georgia, Kentucky, Tennessee, and Virginia
- Key people: Steven C. Smith (President and CEO)
- Products: Dairy, deli, fresh pizza, frozen foods, grocery, meat, produce, snacks, floral, fuel, pharmacy
- Number of employees: 16,000
- Parent: K-VA-T Food Stores, Inc.
- Website: foodcity.com

Food City is an American supermarket chain with stores located in Alabama, Georgia, Kentucky, Tennessee, and Virginia. It is owned by K-VA-T Food Stores, Inc., a privately held family and employee-owned corporation (13% via ESOP) headquartered in Abingdon, Virginia. K-VA-T Food Stores owns the Food City Distribution Center (formerly Mid-Mountain Foods), a distribution center K-VA-T helped form in 1974 and acquired full control of in 1998, Misty Mountain Spring Water, LLC, a producer of bottled water, as well as limited-assortment grocery stores named Super Dollar Food Center, Food City Express and Gas'N Go convenience stores, and Food City Wine and Spirits liquor stores. Many of their supermarkets have their own fuel stations, with the Gas'N Go branding.

It offers many private label product choices under the brands "Food Club," "TopCare", "That's Smart!", "Food City Fresh!", "Full Circle", "Crav'n Flavor", "Paws Happy Life", "Simply Done", "Wide Awake Coffee Co.", "Tippy Toes", "Harvest Club", "Evolve", "Over the Top", "Nostimo", "CharKing", "Misty Mountain", "Flock's Finest", "Culinary Tours", "Pure Harmony" and more, many of which are part of the Topco corporate brand program. Food City is also the exclusive distributor of regional favorites such as "Kay's Ice Cream", "Moore's Classic Snacks", "Terry's Classic Snacks", "Kern's Bread", and "Lay Classic Meats".

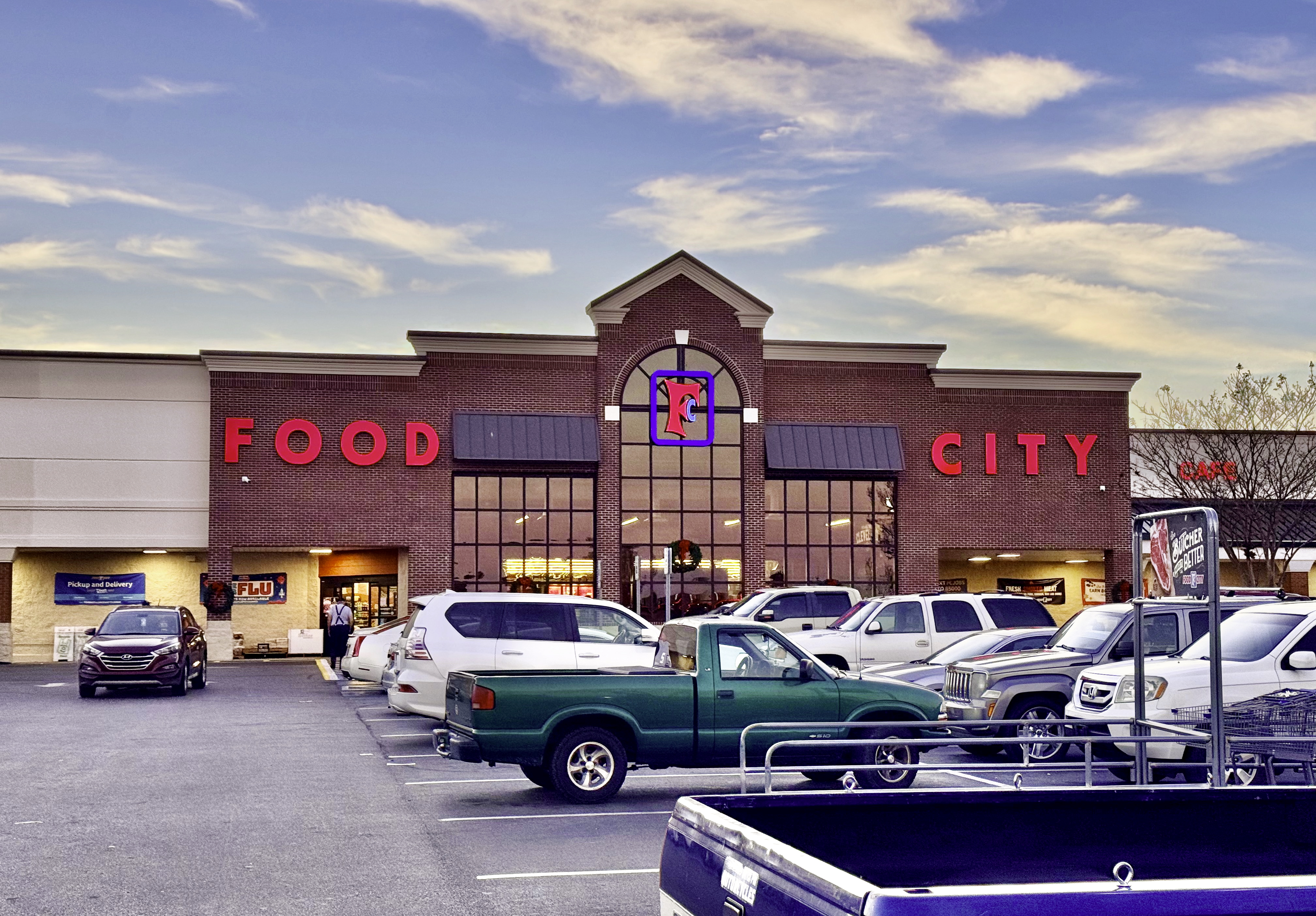
A Food City location in Cleveland, Tennessee

== History ==
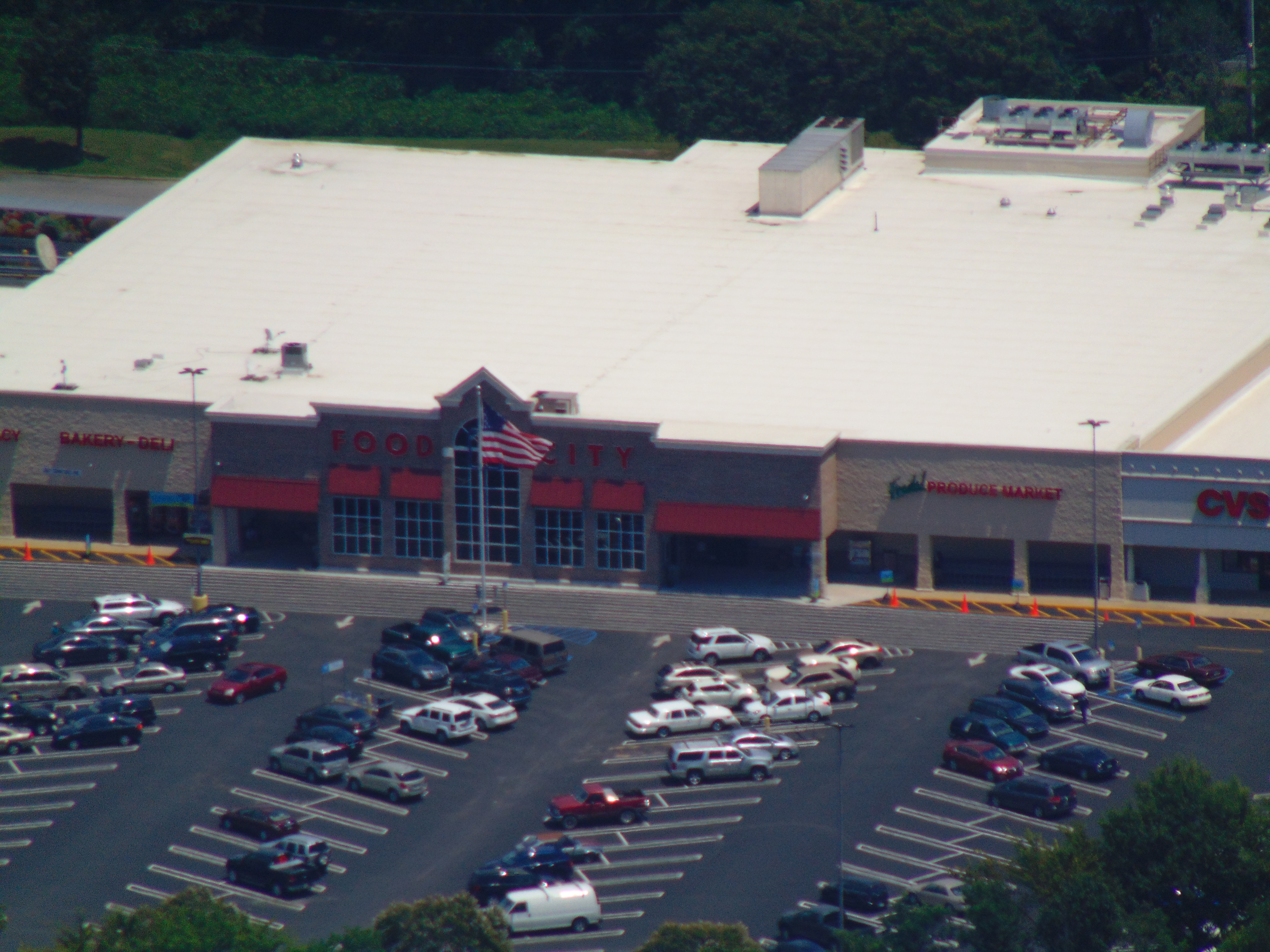
A Food City location in Chattanooga, Tennessee

K-VA-T Food Stores, Inc. traces its history to 1955, when company founder Jack Smith opened his first 8,800-square-foot (820 m^{2}) Piggly Wiggly store in Grundy, Virginia, with the help of three special stockholders: his father, Curtis Smith, uncle, Earl Smith and cousin, Ernest Smith. In 1963, Smith added a second store in South Williamson, Kentucky, followed by a newly constructed third location in Pikeville, Kentucky, in 1965, and a store in Prestonsburg, Kentucky, in 1967.

The company continued to grow steadily until 1984 when it acquired Quality Foods, a 19-store chain (founded in 1918), that operated under the Food City name. The Smiths adopted Food City as the new nameplate, along with its heritage, for all of their stores going forward. In 1989, Food City purchased the 37-store White Stores chain based out of Knoxville, Tennessee, more than doubling the size of the company.

In 1998, Food City acquired the 11-store Kennedy Piggly Wiggly chain as well as full control of Mid-Mountain Foods, the current Food City Distribution Center. The following year, Winn-Dixie pulled out of the Knoxville market and sold their seven stores to Food City. In February 2006, Food City announced the purchase of eight BI-LO locations in Knoxville, Maryville, and Oak Ridge, Tennessee.

K-VA-T celebrated its 50th anniversary November 17, 2005, by opening a 46,500 square feet (4,320 m^{2}) store in Vansant, Virginia, just outside Grundy. Three years later, in October 2008, K-VA-T opened its 100th store in Rogersville, Tennessee. The company celebrated this event by sending a special commemorative I-beam to every store in the company where employees signed it as a goodwill gesture for the new store. The beam sits above the entrance way in the 100th store.

In December 2010, K-VA-T purchased Old Town Market in Tazewell, Tennessee, as a replacement store for their New Tazewell, Tennessee, location.

In July 2015, Food City announced the purchase of 21 BI-LO locations in the Chattanooga, Tennessee market as well as eight BI-LO stores in Northern Georgia from Southeastern Grocers. The company plans to invest over $40 million in capital improvements to the locations during the first year as well as install Gas'N Go fuel stations in as many locations as possible. K-VA-T reached a milestone in October 2015 by opening its first Georgia location, a converted BI-LO, in Rossville, Georgia. That same month, K-VA-T opened a 62,000 square feet (5,800 m^{2}) Food City in Johnson City, Tennessee, the largest store ever constructed by the company.

In November 2017, Food City opened its first in-store Starbucks in a newly built location in Athens, Tennessee. As of April 2024, the company operates 60 Starbucks in-store locations.

In February 2020, The National Grocers Association named K-VA-T Food Stores and Food City as Outstanding Marketer at the 2020 NGA Creative Choice Awards.

In June 2020, K-VA-T announced that they were expanding into their fifth state with plans to construct a 54,000 square feet (5,000 m^{2}) supermarket in Albertville, Alabama. The store opened on April 14, 2021.

In August 2022, K-VA-T announced plans to acquire the Cooke’s family of stores in the Greater Cleveland, Tennessee, market area. These stores include four Fresh n’ Low locations and the Cooke's Food Store and Pharmacy in Tennessee along with one Fresh n’ Low location in Georgia. By January 2025, Food City had consolidated all of the Fresh n’ Low and Cookes stores into nearby, newly expanded Food City locations or, in Ocoee and North Cleveland, had built much larger, Food City replacement stores.

In October 2025, K-VA-T agreed to acquire three Winn-Dixie locations, this time in the Birmingham, Alabama market, with plans to convert the stores located in Fultondale, Trussville, and Jasper, to their Food City banner in early November 2025.

=== Headquarters ===
K-VA-T's corporate operations were located in Grundy, Virginia, from its inception in 1955 until it moved to Abingdon, Virginia, in the 1970s. Over the course of the years, the company's operations were spread out over five different buildings throughout Abingdon and Washington County.

In October 2013, K-VA-T officially consolidated its corporate operations into a new headquarters building in downtown Abingdon, Virginia, at 1 Food City Circle. The four-story, 140,000 square feet (13,000 m^{2}), facility sits on 17 acres and used parts of the old building in the construction of the new one, with the parking garage receiving renovations to continue its use. In November 2017, K-VA-T donated their previous corporate office building in Abingdon to the Barter Theater.

=== Super Dollar Food Center ===
In 2008, K-VA-T opened its first limited-assortment grocery store named Super Dollar Discount Foods in Wytheville, Virginia, which was later demolished in 2020 to make way for a new Food City location. Over the course of the years, the new format grew by opening up new locations and converting some older, smaller, Food City locations in Pikeville and Prestonsburg, Kentucky; Rogersville, Tennessee; and Grundy, Virginia. In May 2017, K-VA-T began re-branding the Super Dollar Discount Foods stores in Abingdon, Hillsville, and Wytheville, Virginia to the Super Dollar Food Center banner. Over the course of 2017, the rest of the Super Dollar Discount Foods locations were converted to this new banner. As of March 2022, there were 5 Super Dollar locations, with one having a Gas'N Go fuel station.

=== Express by Food City ===
In June 2020, K-VA-T converted its older Pigeon Forge, Tennessee, location to their new Express by Food City format.

=== Food City Wine & Spirits ===
In August 2012, K-VA-T opened its first Food City Wine & Spirits liquor store, in Pikeville, Kentucky. The company's second Food City Wine & Spirits opened in Louisa, Kentucky in August 2015. A third location in Whitesburg, Kentucky was added in May 2020 followed by a fourth location in Middlesboro, Kentucky in September 2021.

=== Convenience stores ===
In April 2012, after purchasing a former Exxon branded station in Coeburn, Virginia, K-VA-T opened its first Food City Express branded convenience store to complement their existing grocery store. In June 2014, K-VA-T opened a second location in a former RaceWay convenience store in Elizabethton, Tennessee, under their Gas'N Go branding. Another pair of Gas'N Go convenience store locations were constructed and opened in Morristown and Bristol, Tennessee, later in 2014. A fifth location was opened in Oliver Springs, Tennessee in July 2016 with a sixth location that opened in Pikeville, Kentucky in June 2023.

=== Curt’s Ace Hardware ===
In April 2022, K-VA-T announced plans to join the Ace Hardware family of stores by launching their line of Curt’s Ace Hardware stores and was evaluating Virginia locations in Abingdon and Bristol along with Piney Flats, Erwin, and Elizabethton, Tennessee in addition to Mize Farm & Garden Supply in Gray, Tennessee, which K-VA-T had recently acquired. In June 2022, the first location opened in Bristol, Virginia. In May 2024, K-VA-T opened their twelfth Ace location in their hometown of Abingdon, Virginia. In March 2025, K-VA-T converted their former Fresh n'Low grocery store in Ocoee, Tennessee to their thirteenth Curt's Ace Hardware location. In April 2025, K-VA-T opened its thirteenth Curt’s Ace Hardware in Galax, Virginia.

=== Defunct banners ===
==== Fresh n’ Low/Cooke's Food Store & Pharmacy ====
In October 2022, K-VA-T began operations of four Fresh n’ Low locations and Cooke's Food Store and Pharmacy in Tennessee along with one Fresh n’ Low location in Georgia.

Food City broke ground on two larger stores to serve as replacements for the Candies Creek and Ocoee Fresh n’ Low locations in June 2023. The Cooke's Food Store and Pharmacy was closed in December 2023 after the Food City near the location was expanded.

By January 2025, all of the Fresh n’ Low locations had been consolidated into nearby, newly remodeled Food City locations or replaced entirely with a larger Food City.

==== Oldtown Market ====
When K-VA-T acquired Quality Foods and adopted the Food City name in 1984, the Galax, Virginia, Piggly Wiggly location was renamed Oldtown Market. In 1989, Food City sold Oldtown Market to two of its retired management team members. This banner is not to be confused with the Old Town Market Tazewell, Tennessee, location that K-VA-T purchased and rebranded in 2010.

==== Valu Foods ====
K-VA-T had converted their Sweetwater, Tennessee, location into Valu Foods, a discount warehouse store. This location closed in 1999.

==== While It Lasts ====
K-VA-T closed one of its two Sevierville, Tennessee, locations in 2005, but it reopened this location a few months later under the While It Lasts banner. This location was used as a closeout store for the various products and brands from the Bi-Lo stores acquisition that were not carried in regular Food City locations. It closed in 2006.

== Community involvement ==
Due to their charitable activities and strong ties to their local economies, Food City received Supermarket News's Community Service Award for 2008.

Steven C. Smith, president and chief executive officer for K-VA-T was named 2009 Grocer of the Year by the Tennessee Grocers & Convenience Store Association during their annual convention. TGCSA selects one outstanding Tennessee retailer who exemplifies the high standards of integrity and efficiency upon which the organization was founded to be named Grocer of the Year.

In February 2013, Food City received the Dale Carnegie Leadership Award which recognizes a commitment to excellent service and quality products; dedication to employee growth; recognition of employee value; and a sense of obligation which brings a high level of community involvement.

=== Animal shelters ===
Each year Food City hosts their Pet Hunger Drive. Shoppers are invited to purchase pre-packaged pet food bags for donation to local animal shelters. In 2017, the campaign raised a record-breaking $109,000 to benefit local animal shelters throughout the region.

=== CSX Santa Train ===
In 1992, Food City began working with the Kingsport Area Chamber of Commerce and CSX Transportation to solicit donations of toys, candy, clothes and money for the Appalachia Santa Train, a 110-mile (180 km) trip through the Appalachian Mountains via train that distributes over 15 tons of gifts to children. Food City's involvement has grown to the point where around 200 volunteers work on the project each year.

=== Juvenile Diabetes Research Foundation ===
K-VA-T holds a company-wide annual fundraising campaign where shoppers can make a contribution through the purchase of a JDRF "sneaker" at the checkout. 100% of the funds collected are donated to the Juvenile Diabetes Research Foundation. As of November 2018, Food City has donated over $1.878 million to JDRF.

=== Locally grown produce and eggs ===
Food City purchases a great deal of their produce within their trade area, providing additional support to the regions in which they operate. The company purchases an average of $6,000,000 in locally grown produce annually from a number of local farms, including those in Grainger, Blount, Hawkins, Unicoi, Jefferson and Sullivan counties in Tennessee; Scott and Carroll counties and through Appalachian Harvest co-op for locally grown organics from the growers in Scott County, Virginia. In July 2011, Food City announced that 95 percent of its eggs would come from Dutt & Wagner of Virginia, Inc., a family-operated egg business that produces and distributes its eggs from Abingdon, Virginia. The remaining 5 percent of eggs are considered specialty products, such as Egg Beaters.

=== Mission: ABLE ===
Since 2011, K-VA-T and NASCAR Champion Richard Petty have teamed up to benefit the Paralyzed Veterans of America's Mission: ABLE campaign by collecting donation from shoppers totaling over $1.26 million. 100% of the donations collected benefit local Paralyzed Veterans within the region.

=== Race Against Hunger ===
Since 1992, Food City stores have held the annual Race Against Hunger holiday campaign where shoppers can make a contribution at the checkout. The Race Against Hunger campaign raises over $350,000 annually for numerous hunger relief organizations throughout the region.

=== School Bucks ===
In 1990, Food City began their Apples for the Students program. From its inception until 2007, the program allowed students to collect specially colored Food City register receipts in exchange for computers, software, sporting goods, calculators, teaching tools, audio/visual and other educational materials for their schools. In 2007, the program went completely electronic, allowing customers to link their Food City loyalty cards to the particular school they wish to donate to. This advancement also allowed schools to check totals online. In 2009, Food City rebranded its Apples for the Students program as Food City School Bucks.

Since the program's inception, Food City has awarded $21.4 million to more than 1,000 schools.

=== Sports ===
Since 1988, Food City has been the official sponsor of the Tim Irwin/Food City Bass Tournament held in Lenoir City, Tennessee. Proceeds from the tournament benefit the Boys & Girls Clubs of the Tennessee Valley and has raised over $1,000,000 since 1988.

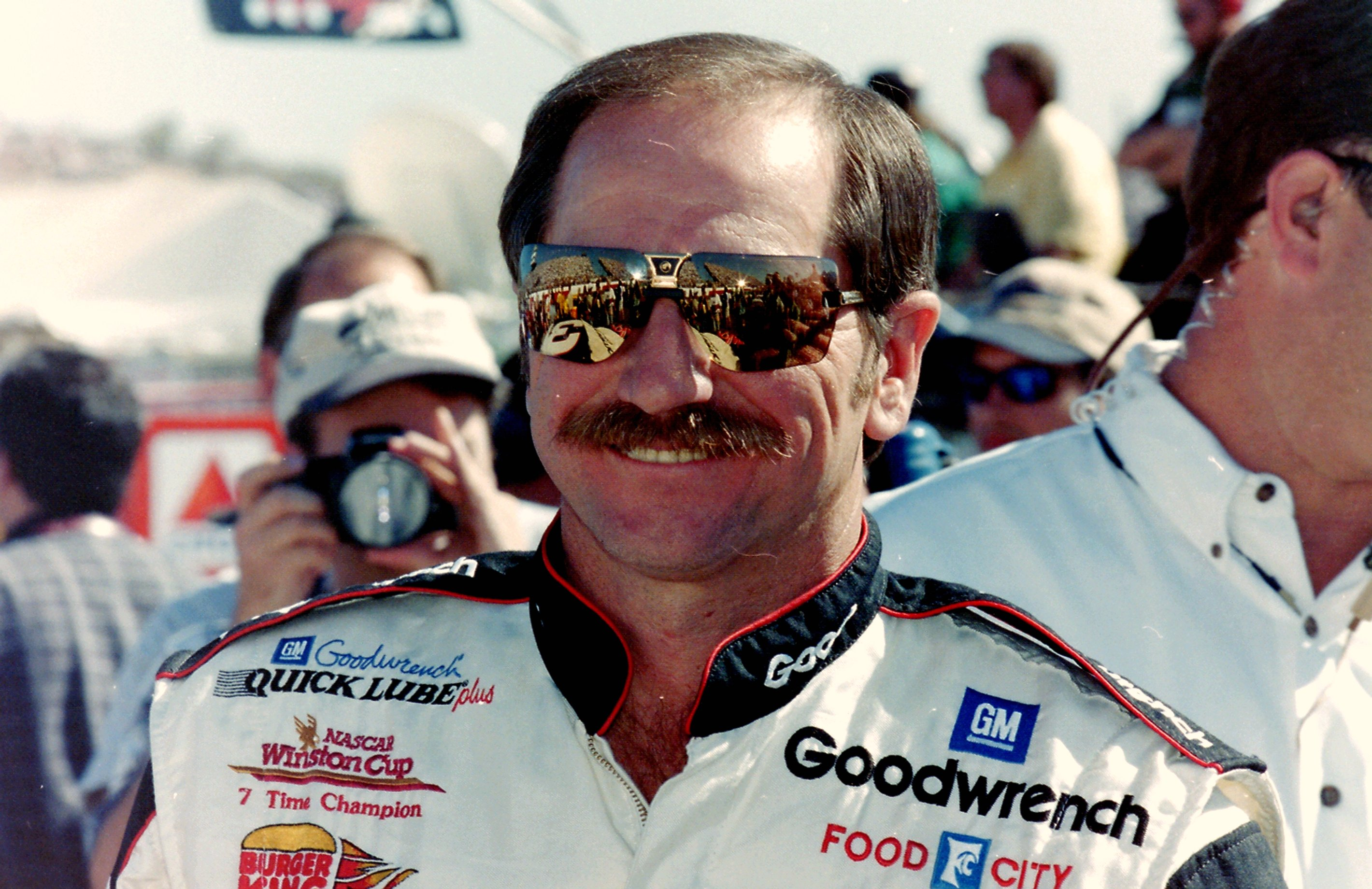
Food City sponsored NASCAR's Dale Earnhardt from 1995 through 1999.

Food City sponsors two NASCAR events at Bristol Motor Speedway, the NASCAR Cup Series' Food City 500 in the spring and the late NASCAR Xfinity Series' Food City 300 in the summer. The Food City deal, which began in 1992, is currently the second longest race entitlement sponsor deal in the Cup Series. As part of the renewal and the 20th anniversary announcement in 2011, following the death in 2010 of track President and General Manager Jeff Byrd, the 20th anniversary race was renamed the Jeff Byrd 500 presented by Food City. The 2015 race was renamed the Food City 500 In Support Of Steve Byrnes And Stand Up To Cancer, while the 2020 race was renamed Food City Presents the Supermarket Heroes 500 to honor front-line workers during the COVID-19 pandemic.

Along with these races, Food City holds the Food City Family Race Nights in Knoxville and Bristol, Tennessee, the week preceding the NASCAR events.

In 1995, Food City signed on as a sponsor of Dale Earnhardt's No. 3 Winston Cup Series Chevrolet race car. They renewed the sponsorship in 1997 for two more years with a bonus sponsorship of Dale Earnhardt Jr.'s Busch Series Chevrolet race car. The Food City/Earnhardt combination captured seven series wins and the 1998 championship during the sponsorship deal.

From 2005 to 2007, Food City also sponsored the former Hooters Pro Cup event at Bristol Motor Speedway, the Food City 150.

Prior to 2010, Food City was a primary sponsor of the Web.com Tour Knoxville Open golf tournament in Knoxville, Tennessee, which benefited several charities.

In September 2014, it was announced that Food City would be a presenting sponsor for the Battle at Bristol football game in 2016 between the Tennessee Volunteers and the Virginia Tech Hokies. In September 2016, Bristol Motor Speedway announced that Food City signed on as the title sponsor of the "Bucs at Bristol" football game between the ETSU Buccaneers and the Western Carolina Catamounts. The Bucs at Bristol game was the first Southern Conference home game for ETSU since 2003 when the school disbanded their football program.

On August 24, 2023 The University of Tennessee announced that Food City had entered into a 25 year partnership with the Athletic Department. The agreement changes the name of the University of Tennessee basketball arena to Thompson-Boling Arena at The Food City Center. In exchange for naming rights, Food City will contribute $20 Million to the school over the next ten years. This agreement expands previous programs in place with the Tennessee Volunteer athletic program

== Locations ==
As of October 2022, K-VA-T Food Stores, Inc. operates 153 retail outlets (132 Food City stores, 6 Super Dollar Food Centers, 4 Wine & Spirits stores, 5 Fresh n' Lows, 1 Cooke's Food Store and Pharmacy, and 5 convenience stores) in Alabama, Georgia, Kentucky, Tennessee, and Virginia. The chain includes over 114 in-store pharmacies and over 100 fuel stations.
