= BI-LO (United States) =

Defunct American supermarket chain owned by Southeastern Grocers

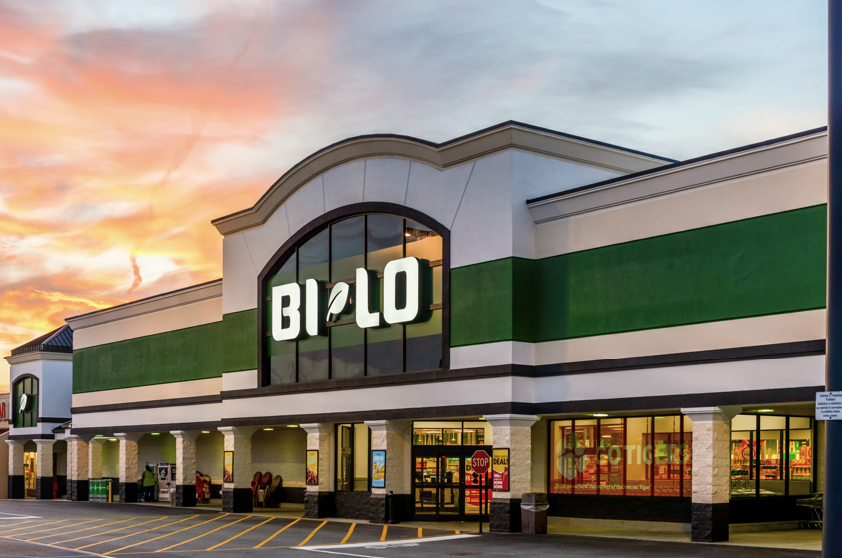
- Type: Private
- Industry: Grocery store
- Founded: 1961; 65 years ago
- Defunct: April 18, 2021
- Fate: Banner eliminated
- Headquarters: Jacksonville, Florida, United States
- Area served: Georgia, South Carolina, Tennessee and North Carolina
- Key people: Anthony Hucker (president and CEO)
- Products: Bakery, dairy, deli, frozen foods, general grocery, meat, produce, seafood, snacks, liquor
- Number of employees: About 13,000
- Parent: Southeastern Grocers
- Website: www.bi-lo.com

BI-LO was an American supermarket chain owned by Southeastern Grocers, headquartered in Jacksonville, Florida. At the time of the banner’s elimination, supermarkets under the BI-LO brand were operated in Georgia, South Carolina, and North Carolina.

== History ==
=== Founding and purchase by Ahold ===
In 1961, Frank Outlaw, a former Winn-Dixie executive, bought four Greenville, South Carolina, grocery stores from the chain Wrenn and Syracuse and created the Wrenn & Outlaw chain. The official name of the company became BI-LO in 1963. Outlaw created a contest and asked the employees to submit store names. Edna Plumblee, Outlaw's secretary, won the contest by submitting the name "BI-LO". The image of a Hereford bull became the store's symbol and fiberglass bulls were installed on top of each store. These were a trademark sight until they were removed between 1981 and 1992.

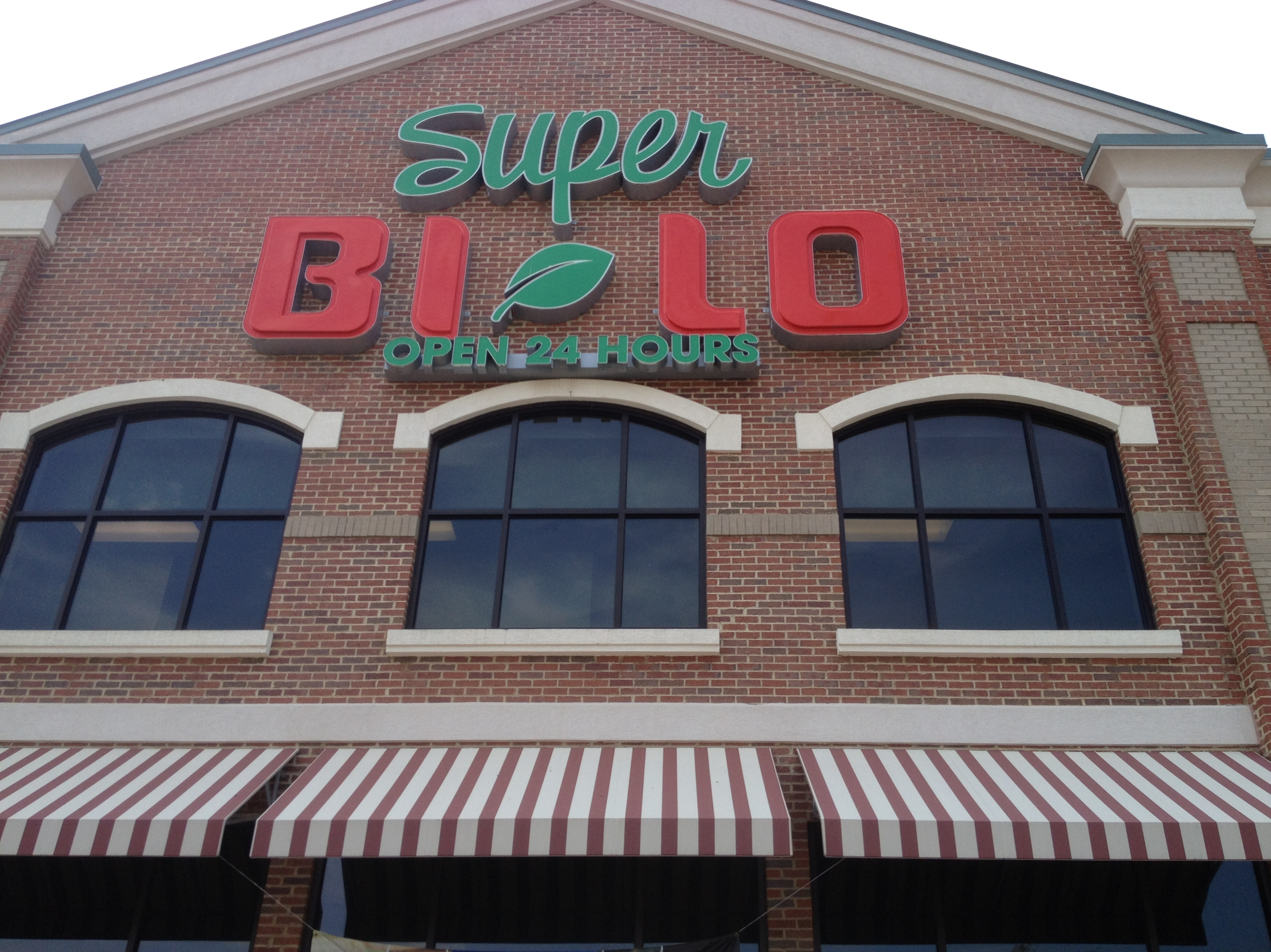

BI-LO was sold to Ahold, a Dutch retail food conglomerate, in 1977. In October 1988, BI-LO purchased 21 stores from Kroger located in North Carolina and South Carolina. In August 1990, BI-LO purchased the flagship store of rival Community Cash located in Spartanburg, South Carolina. In February 1994, Ahold purchased Red Food Stores, Inc. and merged its 55 locations in Georgia, Alabama, and Tennessee into BI-LO the following year. In 1997, the company introduced its Bonus card loyalty program, which helped increase store profits by 30% in the first year.

In 1998, the company sponsored the construction of the BI-LO Center, now named the Bon Secours Wellness Arena in Greenville, South Carolina. In May 2000, BI-LO acquired 134 convenience stores from Golden Gallon, based in Chattanooga, TN. The company would retain the store names.

In June 2001, BI-LO debuted its discount grocery format, FoodSmart in Camden, South Carolina. A month later, BI-LO purchased eight Harris Teeter grocery stores in South Carolina and converted those stores to either BI-LO or the FoodSmart formats. In September 2001, Ahold purchased the Birmingham, Alabama based Bruno's Supermarkets chain and combined its operations with BI-LO.

In 2003, BI-LO invested in redesigning its store layout to attract high-end customers. The result was the new Super BI-LO concept of a larger store layout featuring a greater selection of healthier foods, specialty foods, and organic foods. The company opened new Super BI-LO branded stores as well as remodeled older stores in affluent neighborhoods during this redesign period.

=== Sale to Lone Star Funds ===
In 2005, Ahold sold BI-LO/Bruno's to Lone Star Funds. In order to concentrate on renovating older stores, building new ones, and investing in newer information technology, the new owners sold off 104 BI-LO, FoodSmart, Bruno's, Food Fair, and Food World stores in areas where the chain did not have significant market penetration. They also sold off three BI-LO/Bruno's distribution centers to grocery wholesaler C&S Wholesale Grocers who converted some of the stores to Southern Family Markets. Included in the sell-off were all stores in the Knoxville, TN, area which nearly all were immediately occupied by Food City stores.

On March 21, 2007, Lone Star Funds announced the corporate spin-off of the 67 Bruno's Supermarkets and Food World stores from BI-LO LLC into a separate company to be based out of Birmingham. On April 16, 2007, Lone Star announced the 230-store BI-LO chain was up for sale. Soon after, C&S announced that it was closing the Chattanooga distribution center that served the BI-LOs in the Chattanooga area and portions of North Georgia.

=== 2009 bankruptcy and Winn-Dixie merger ===
On March 23, 2009, the company announced that it had filed Chapter 11 bankruptcy after it defaulted on a $260 million loan due to the 2008 financial crisis. The company said to expect its stores and regular operations to continue to operate as usual during the process. The company secured a $100 million loan from GE Capital in order to continue paying wages, salaries, benefits, suppliers, and vendors.

In October 2009, Delhaize Group, headquartered in Belgium and owner of competing chain Food Lion, announced that it had entered a preliminary, non-binding agreement to purchase $425 million worth of assets from the chain. In November, the company outlined its restructuring to the U.S. Bankruptcy Court, with Lone Star Funds providing a $350 million cash infusion. Delhaize Group and Food Lion were subsequently left out of the submitted plans. Lone Star Funds said that it was possible that BI-LO could emerge from bankruptcy in the first quarter of 2010.

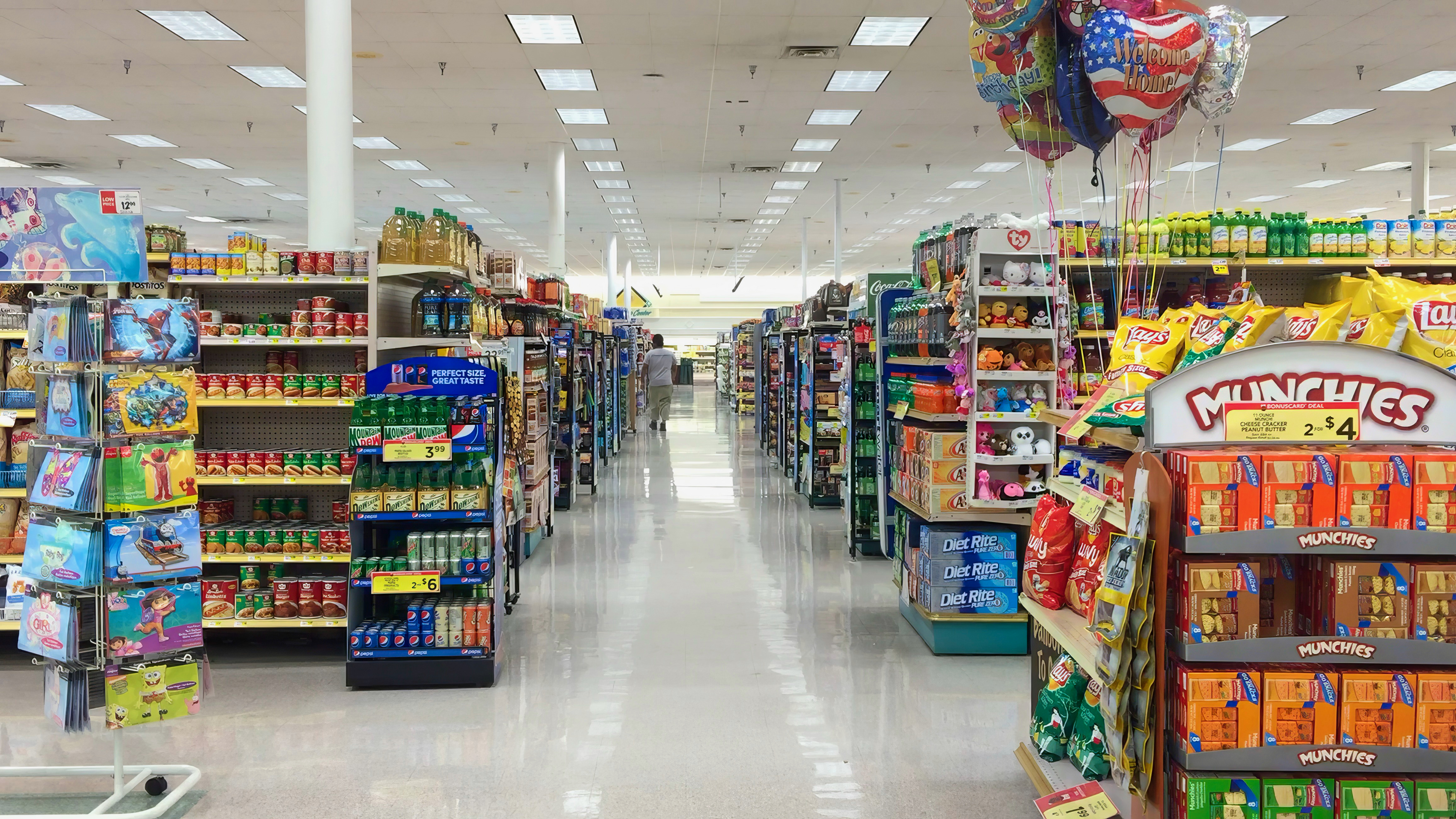
The interior of a BI-LO store in Chattanooga, Tennessee

On May 12, 2010, the company emerged from bankruptcy. BI-LO, ranked by Supermarket News in the Top 75 Retailers, remained under ownership of Lone Star Funds after restructuring. BI-LO was reportedly put up for sale in August 2010; Kroger and Publix were said to be interested in acquiring the chain, but nothing developed from these rumors.

On December 19, 2011, it was announced that BI-LO and Winn-Dixie would merge to create an organization with 690 grocery stores and 63,000 employees in eight states throughout the southeastern United States. BI-LO would purchase Winn-Dixie for $530 million and operate Winn-Dixie as a subsidiary. It was later announced that the merged company would be based at Winn-Dixie's former headquarters in Jacksonville, Florida. In early 2013, BI-LO phased out its own private label soft drinks in its BI-LO stores in favor of the "Chek" brand used by Winn-Dixie.

In September 2013, BI-LO agreed to buy 22 Piggly Wiggly stores in South Carolina and Georgia from Piggly Wiggly Carolina. The following day, BI-LO agreed to sell seven BI-LO locations in the Charlotte, North Carolina region to Publix.

=== Formation of Southeastern Grocers ===
In September 2013, Southeastern Grocers was created by Lone Star Funds as the new parent company for BI-LO, Harveys, and Winn-Dixie. The new parent company then filed to raise as much as $500 million in a U.S. initial public offering and list its common stock under the "SEG" symbol. On August 19, 2014, Southeastern Grocers withdrew its IPO filing with the SEC, aborting the process of listing the stock for public sale.

In July 2015, Southeastern Grocers announced the sale of its 21 BI-LO locations in the Chattanooga market as well as eight BI-LO locations in Northern Georgia to K-VA-T Food Stores, which would rebrand the stores under its Food City banner. The two companies said that stores would begin transitioning August 30 and would be completed by October 5, 2015. Southeastern Grocers was expected to use proceeds from the deal to reduce debt. This sale ended BI-LO's presence in the Tennessee market.

In May 2017, Southeastern Grocers announced the closing of six BI-LO stores in North Carolina and South Carolina as part of a corporate-wide closure of 20 locations along with the elimination of some department lead roles at stores. Later that same month, BI-LO announced the closings of three additional stores in Newton, North Carolina and Florence and Irmo, South Carolina.

=== 2018 bankruptcy ===
On March 15, 2018, Southeastern Grocers announced they would file a plan of reorganization under Chapter 11 by the end of March. According to the company, the restructuring would decrease overall debt levels by over $500 million. Under this plan, 22 BI-LO stores would close along with an additional 72 stores across the Harveys, Fresco y Más, and Winn-Dixie brands.

On March 28, 2018, Southeastern agreed to sell three BI-LO locations in South Carolina along with three Harveys locations in Georgia to three independent Piggly Wiggly store owners. The deals are in conjunction with the restructuring support agreement revealed by Southeastern Grocers. On April 27, 2018, Food Lion announced plans to acquire four BI-LO locations in Florence, Myrtle Beach, Surfside Beach, and Columbia, South Carolina. On April 30, 2018, Publix announced they would acquire the lease, fixtures, equipment, permits, and licenses for the Seneca, South Carolina BI-LO location slated to close as part of the original restructuring plan. Two of the BI-LO locations originally closed as part of the bankruptcy reorganization in April 2018, Ladson and Mullins, South Carolina, were acquired by another independent Piggly Wiggly owner and would be reopened in June 2018.

In May 2018, Southeastern Grocers restructuring plan was confirmed by a U.S. Bankruptcy judge in Delaware. At the end of that month, Southeastern Grocers announced that it had completed its financial restructuring and was emerging from bankruptcy. As part of the restructuring, $522 million in debt was exchanged for equity in Southeastern Grocers, though it was not announced who was receiving the equity shares. Southeastern Grocers exited bankruptcy with 575 stores in seven states, down from 704 locations. They also announced a planned remodels of 100 stores in 2018.

In February 2019, Southeastern Grocers announced plans to close 22 locations. This round of closures included 13 BI-LO locations in Georgia, North Carolina, and South Carolina.

=== Elimination of the BI-LO banner ===
On June 9, 2020, Southeastern Grocers announced it was phasing out the BI-LO banner. As part of an effort to reach that goal, Southeastern agreed to sell 62 stores, including 46 BI-LO and 16 Harveys Supermarkets, to Ahold Delhaize subsidiary Food Lion. As part of that agreement, they would also be transitioning their Mauldin, South Carolina, distribution center over to Ahold Delhaize USA Distribution, LLC. The transition was expected to be completed by April 2021.

In addition, Southeastern announced it was divesting the assets of 57 of the in-store pharmacies it operates under the BI-LO and Harveys Supermarket banners to CVS Pharmacy and Walgreens. These locations included all of the company's BI-LO pharmacies and nine Harveys Supermarket pharmacies in Georgia. The transition was expected to begin within two weeks of the press release date.

On December 21, 2020, two independent Piggly Wiggly owners, with support from C&S Wholesale Grocers, announced plans to acquire one BI-LO supermarket in South Carolina and another in Georgia from Southeastern Grocers. Both locations were previously Piggly Wiggly stores that were acquired by SEG in 2013.

In January 2021, Food Lion purchased additional stores located in North and South Carolina that were scheduled to close, acquiring roughly 70 stores total. The remaining stores that were not sold to any other operators were closed on or by April 18, 2021, ending the 60 year run of the BI-LO banner.

== Private labels ==
Throughout late 2004 and 2005, the company gradually phased out its "BI-LO" private label for its store products and replaced it with new packaging and a new name, "Southern Home", which began also being offered at Harveys Supermarkets locations after Southeastern Grocers' acquisition of the chain from Delhaize. In the late 2000s, the chain started offering the budget-conscious Clear Value brand on select products, supplied by Topco. Beginning in 2017, the Southern Home banner used for private-label products began to be phased out for a tiered brand entitled SE Grocers, which was the private label brand used at all Southeastern Grocers owned stores, including Winn-Dixie (whose namesake private label brand was phased out).
