= Winn-Dixie =

American supermarket chain

The Winn-Dixie Company, LLC

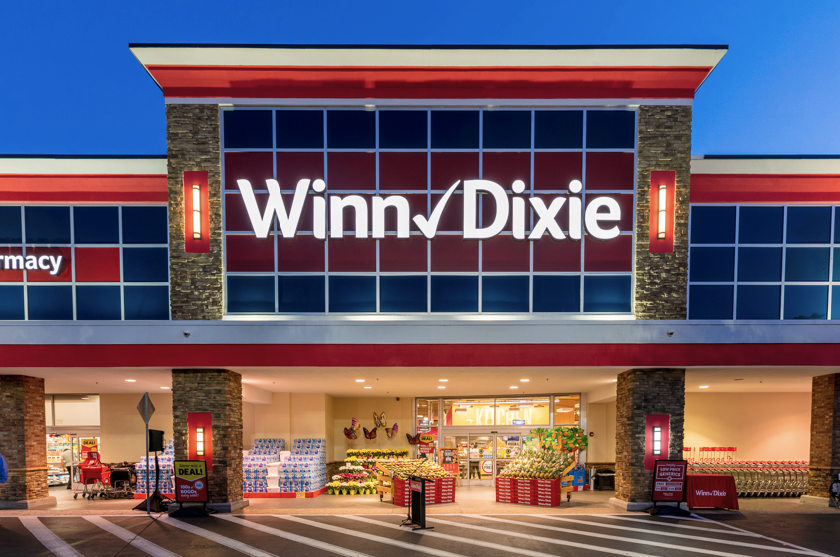
- Type: Subsidiary
- Industry: Supermarket/Retail
- Founded: 1925 (101 years ago)
- Founders: William Milton Davis; Artemus Darius Davis; James Elsworth Davis; Milton Austin Davis; Tine Wayne Davis; Bill Lovett; E.L. Winn
- Headquarters: Jacksonville, Florida, U.S.
- Key people: Anthony Hucker, Chairman, President & CEO
- Products: Bakery, dairy, deli, frozen foods, general grocery, meat, produce, seafood, liquor
- Parent: The Winn-Dixie Company
- Website: www.winndixie.com

The Winn-Dixie Company, LLC, is an American supermarket chain headquartered in Jacksonville, Florida. Founded in 1925, Winn-Dixie grocery stores and liquor stores serve communities throughout southeastern states – Florida and Georgia. Winn-Dixie is a subsidiary of The Winn-Dixie Company.

== Overview ==
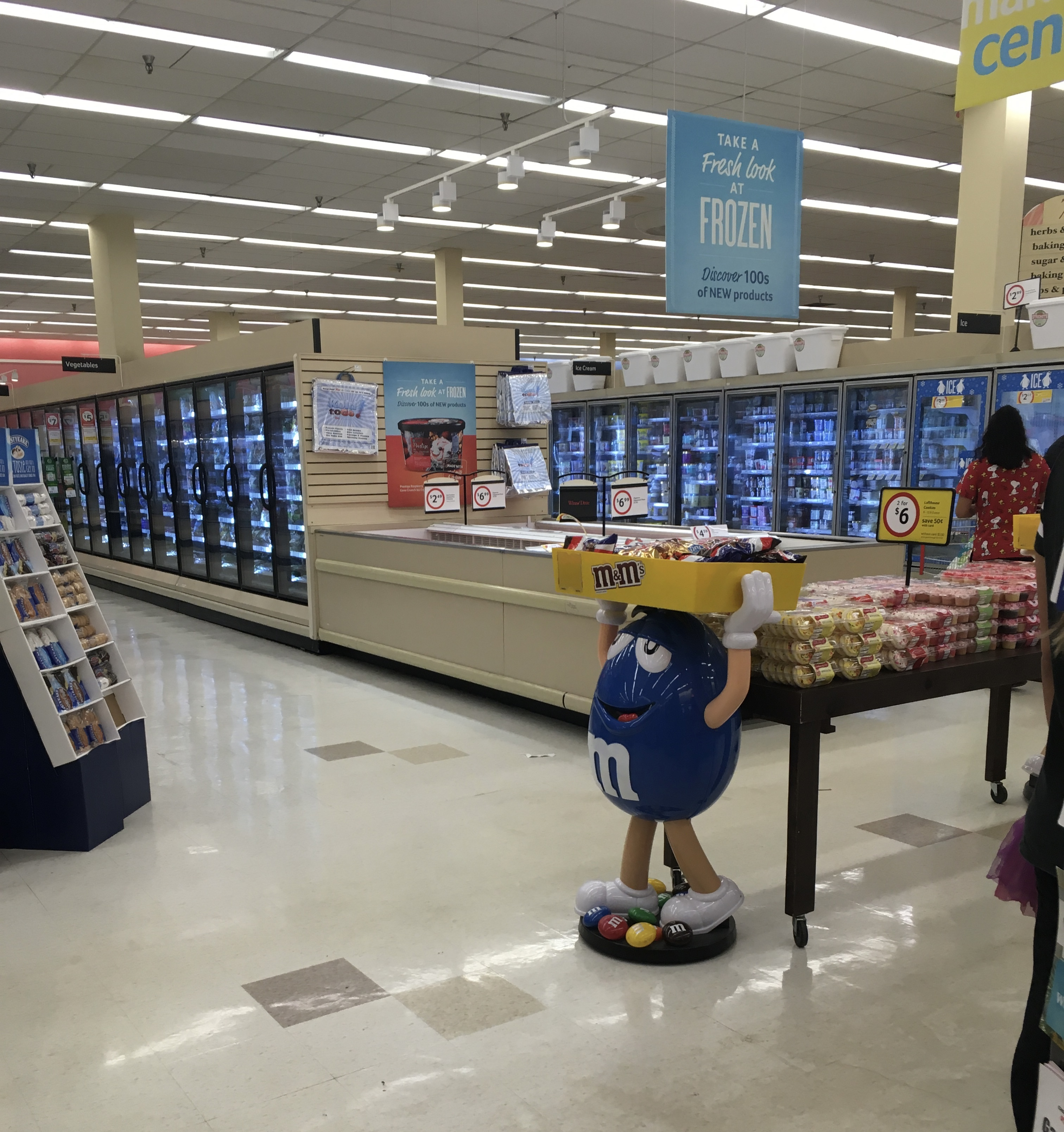
The frozen food section of a Winn-Dixie in Thonotosassa, Florida.

Winn-Dixie is known for its private label Chek brand soft drinks, which are produced in over 20 different flavors plus diet and caffeine-free varieties—one of the widest assortments. It has been known as "The Beef People" throughout its lifetime. The checkmark in the company's logo comes from Kwik Chek, another store the company owned.

In its advertising and print media, Winn-Dixie used slogans such as "We're Right For You" starting in 1982, "America's Supermarket" from 1985 until 2001, "The Real Deal" from 2001 to 2004, and since 2018, "It's a Winn Win!" Winn-Dixie has also been known for its use of the brand promises of "Fresh Checked Every Day" for its Jacksonville, Florida locations, "Getting Better All The Time" in its locations in Central Florida, "El Sabor De Tu País", or "The Flavor Of Your Country", in its Miami area stores, and "Local Flavor Since 1956" in its Louisiana area stores.

Winn-Dixie was listed in the S&P 500 and had been traded on the New York Stock Exchange under the ticker symbol "WIN" since February 18, 1952, prior to filing for Chapter 11 bankruptcy in 2005. The company was then traded under the symbol "WINN" on the NASDAQ before its purchase in 2012.

== History ==
=== Beginnings ===
The Winn-Dixie logo in use from 1958 to 1982.

Winn-Dixie was built up by William Milton Davis and his sons Artemus Darius Davis, James Elsworth Davis, Milton Austin Davis and Tine Wayne Davis. William Davis started in business in Burley, Idaho, where he bought a general store in 1914 that he later renamed Davis Mercantile. As was common then, he sold most goods on credit. The advent of cash-only grocery stores in the 1920s hurt Davis's business as the new stores offered lower prices and larger selections.

In 1925, William Davis borrowed $10,000 from his father and moved to Miami, Florida, where he purchased the Rockmoor Grocery. In 1927, the company was renamed Table Supply, and four more stores were opened. In 1931, the Davis family bought the Lively Stores chain for $10,000, to create a chain of 33 Table Supply stores across Florida from Miami to Tampa. William Milton Davis died in 1934, leaving his four sons in charge of the company.

=== Takeover of Winn & Lovett ===
Founded in 1920 by Bill Lovett and E.L. Winn, Winn & Lovett had 78 stores in 1939 when the Davis brothers bought 51 percent of the chain. In 1944, the brothers bought the remainder of the company and merged their other chains under the Winn & Lovett name. The company headquarters moved to Jacksonville.

Winn & Lovett purchased the Steiden Stores chain of 31 stores in Kentucky in 1945 as well as Margaret Ann Stores, with 46 stores in Florida, in 1949. In 1952, Winn & Lovett became the first industrial corporation based in Florida to be listed on the New York Stock Exchange (NYSE). In April 1954, the company also acquired the Jitney Jungle stores around Anniston, Alabama.

Winn & Lovett continued to grow by acquiring other chains, including Penney Stores in Mississippi, and Ballentine Stores and Eden Stores in South Carolina were all acquired in 1955.

=== Renaming to Winn-Dixie ===
In October 1955, Winn & Lovett merged with the 116-store, Greenville, South Carolina-based Dixie-Home Stores chain, and changed its corporate name to Winn-Dixie Stores, Inc.. At the outset of the merger, the company's operations comprised the Table Supply and Margaret Ann chains in southwest Florida, the Kwik Chek chain in Florida, Georgia, and Alabama, the Dixie-Home chain in the Carolinas, and Steiden Stores in Kentucky and Indiana. The company numbered nearly 400 stores by this point.

In 1956, Winn-Dixie bought Ketner-Milner Stores in North Carolina, as well as King Stores in Georgia. The company entered into Louisiana and Mississippi the same year with the acquisition of H.G. Hill Stores. By late 1958, all of Winn-Dixie Stores' operations were consolidated into either the Winn-Dixie or Kwik-Chek nameplates.

Winn-Dixie moved into Virginia in October 1958 with the acquisition of the Martinsville-based George's Supermarkets (converting them two years later), and in Tennessee by way of Elizabethton-based Anderson's Super Markets in January 1959, amounting to 495 stores across eleven states by mid-1959.

After the company was barred by the Federal Trade Commission from acquiring stores in the United States without prior approval, the now over-700-store Winn-Dixie operation extended its reach to the Bahamas, acquiring the eleven-store City Meat Market chain from Sir Stafford Sands in May 1967. Winn-Dixie operated 12 stores (nine City Markets and three Winn-Dixie stores) through its domestic subsidiary, W-D (Bahamas) Limited, until it sold the chain to Bahamian investors in 2006.

In June 1975, the chain's five remaining Indiana locations would be closed and sold to Allied Grocers of Indiana. The chain would return to the area in the mid-1980s, but would close its last Indiana store in 2000.

The company expanded further westward in August 1976 with the purchase of Fort Worth-based Kimbell Inc., owners of the Buddies, Hagee, and Foodway chains in Texas, Oklahoma, and New Mexico. The Foodway stores in New Mexico would retain their names while the other chains were assimilated into the Winn-Dixie brand. By this time, it had set up division offices and distribution centers in Charlotte, Orlando and Fort Worth.

In 1981, Sam Walton joined the company's board of directors, serving until 1986. A. Dano Davis, son of J.E., became president in 1982, and R.D. Davis, son of A.D. Davis, became vice chairman of the board. Dano then assumed the role of chairman when J.E. stepped down the following year. In 1984, the company opened its first Winn-Dixie Marketplace, a 45,000-square-foot facility in Valdosta, Georgia.

Former chairman James E. Davis died at the age of 85 in March 1993. In April 1995, Winn-Dixie expanded into Ohio with the purchase of the Cincinnati-based Thriftway Food Drug. In June, A.D. Davis, the last of the four Davis brothers, died at the age of 89. In October 1995, 22 stores were fined by the state of Georgia for selling expired food.

=== Financial downturn and 2005 bankruptcy ===
In November 1999, Kroger announced its intention to purchase 74 Winn-Dixie locations in Texas and Oklahoma. However, the Federal Trade Commission (FTC) blocked the sale in June 2000 and the deal was cancelled.

Winn-Dixie underwent a major restructuring, announcing in April 2000 that it was cutting 11,000 jobs and closing 114 stores. A Tampa warehouse, factories in Jacksonville, and offices in Tampa, Atlanta, and Louisville were all closed. Ten company vice presidents were also given early retirement. By this point, Winn-Dixie was falling behind in the market and losing money. It faced significant competition from Wal-Mart, with many stores overlapping, and needed to make major investments in order to modernize.

In October 2000, it acquired Jitney Jungle, which had 106 grocery stores, gas stations, and liquor stores at the time. Winn-Dixie initially planned to buy 72 of its stores for $85 million, but the FTC interceded and limited the sale to 68 stores due to concerns over competition in certain areas of Florida, Mississippi, and Alabama.

In May 2002, Winn-Dixie announced it was closing all its stores in Texas and Oklahoma, and laying off 5,300 employees, citing increased competition from Wal-Mart. At the time, the company had 71 stores in Texas, five stores in Oklahoma, and a distribution center and a dairy plant in Fort Worth.

In April 2004, Winn-Dixie announced the closure of 156 stores, and the elimination of 10,000 jobs. Included were the 21 stores that had operated under the Thriftway name in and around Cincinnati. By July, Winn-Dixie agreed to sell several Thriftway locations to Kroger, Remke Markets, and Bigg's Supermarkets. Another 40 stores in the Atlanta area were converted to the Save Rite Grocery Warehouse brand, as an alternative to store closure. In October, the company sold 10 stores in North Carolina and Virginia to Salisbury-based Food Lion, with the stores in Clarksville, Danville, Martinsville, South Hill, Stanleytown, and Elizabethtown converting to the Food Lion name.

On February 22, 2005, Winn-Dixie filed for bankruptcy. Despite being a publicly traded company, the Davis family still held about 35 percent of Winn-Dixie stock. Starting in June, the company adjusted its store hours and stopped 24/7 service. On June 21, it announced the sale or closure of 326 stores and the elimination of 22,000 store positions and 500 corporate employees. In July, seven stores were sold in the Piedmont Triad.

As part of the restructuring, the company pulled out of the Carolinas, Tennessee, Texas, and Virginia. It also exited the Atlanta market. Once the restructuring was completed, Winn-Dixie's footprint was reduced to the Bahamas, and five of the Deep South states—almost all of Florida and Alabama, the southeastern half of Louisiana, the southeast corner of Mississippi, and the southwest and coastal corners of Georgia. With the closures, Winn-Dixie now had fewer stores than it had in the 1950s.

On February 28, 2006, it was announced that 35 more stores were to be sold or closed within the coming months, with the Central and South Florida areas being the most affected. On March 31, 2006, it was announced that the chain would sell its 12 Bahamian locations, which had been operated by a wholly owned subsidiary, W-D Limited, under the names City Market and Winn-Dixie.

=== BI-LO acquisition ===
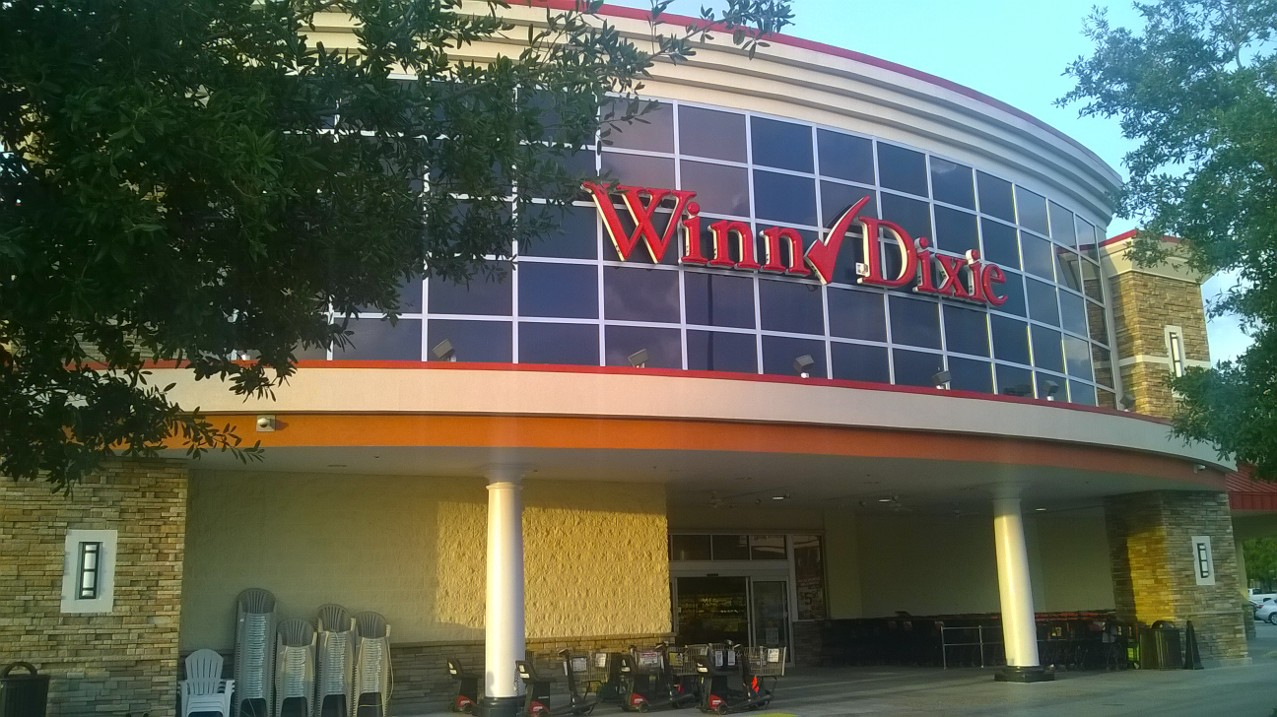
Store#736 in Port Charlotte, Florida, remodeled post-bankruptcy

On June 29, 2006, Winn-Dixie announced that it had filed a plan of reorganization with the U.S. Bankruptcy Court for the Middle District of Florida. The company emerged from Chapter 11 protection on November 21, 2006, in a much stronger financial position. In July 2010, Winn-Dixie closed 30 underperforming stores and cut 120 roles.

Winn-Dixie discontinued its use of the name SaveRite in 2011. December 19, 2011, Winn-Dixie agreed to be sold to BI-LO for $530 million. As part of the deal, Winn-Dixie became a subsidiary of BI-LO but its stores would continue to operate under the Winn-Dixie name.

The merger was completed in March 2012, making Winn-Dixie a subsidiary of Bi-Lo Holdings. The combined company operated 750 stores in seven southeastern states, employing approximately 63,000 team members. The merged company moved its headquarters from BI-LO's base in Mauldin, South Carolina to Winn-Dixie's former headquarters in Jacksonville.

On October 8, 2013, all remaining Sweetbay Supermarket locations were rebranded as Winn-Dixie following its purchase by Bi-Lo. In May 2015, Bi-Lo Holdings changed its name to Southeastern Grocers.

In May 2017, Southeastern Grocers announced the closing of eight Winn-Dixie stores as part of a corporate-wide closure of 23 locations along with the elimination of some department lead roles at stores. In July 2017, it was announced that Southeastern Grocers would debut the Harveys brand in the Central and West Florida markets with the conversion of seven Winn-Dixie stores. In October 2017, Southeastern announced that three more West Florida Winn-Dixie stores would be converted to the Harveys brand, and an additional five South Florida stores would become Fresco y Más locations in November 2017.

=== 2018 bankruptcy ===
In February 2018, Southeastern Grocers announced it was selling eight Winn-Dixie locations in south Louisiana to Texas-based, Brookshire Grocery Company as well as an additional three Mississippi and four New Orleans market locations to Baton Rouge-based, Shoppers Value Foods.

On March 15, 2018, Southeastern Grocers announced it would file a plan of reorganization under Chapter 11 by the end of March. According to the company, the restructuring would decrease overall debt levels by over $500 million. Under this plan, 35 Winn-Dixie stores would close, along with an additional 59 stores across the BI-LO, Harveys, and Fresco y Más brands.

On March 22, 2018, Southeastern announced that the Orange Beach, Alabama Winn-Dixie location would be sold to Rouses Markets. On March 28, Southeastern agreed to sell three Winn-Dixie stores in northeast Alabama to wholesaler Mitchell Grocery Corp on behalf of two of its current customers, Johnson's Giant Foods and The D'Alessandro Organization LLC, while the Winn-Dixie location in Atmore, Alabama, would be acquired by Ramey's. An additional three BI-LO locations in South Carolina along with three Harveys locations in Georgia would be sold to three independent Piggly Wiggly store owners. The deals are in conjunction with the restructuring support agreement revealed by Southeastern Grocers.

On March 31, 2018, Southeastern announced that the Andalusia, Alabama Winn-Dixie location's lease and equipment would be purchased by a Piggly Wiggly franchisee. On May 1, an independent Piggly Wiggly operator announced that they would re-open the Montgomery, Alabama Winn-Dixie location that closed as part of the original restructuring plan. The store was subsequently closed in 2020.

In May 2018, Southeastern Grocers' restructuring plan was confirmed by a U.S. Bankruptcy judge in Delaware. At the end of that month, Southeastern Grocers announced that it had completed its financial restructuring and was emerging from bankruptcy. As part of the restructuring, $522 million in debt was exchanged for equity in Southeastern Grocers, though it was not announced who was receiving the equity shares. Southeastern Grocers exited bankruptcy with 575 stores in seven states, down from 704 locations. They also announced a planned remodels of 100 stores in 2018.

In February 2019, Southeastern Grocers announced plans to close 22 locations in Florida, Georgia, North Carolina, and South Carolina. This round of closures included seven Winn-Dixie locations.

In 2020 Southeast Grocers began the Romay Davis Belonging, Inclusion and Diversity Grant with the goal of funding minority-supporting organizations.

=== Sale to Aldi ===
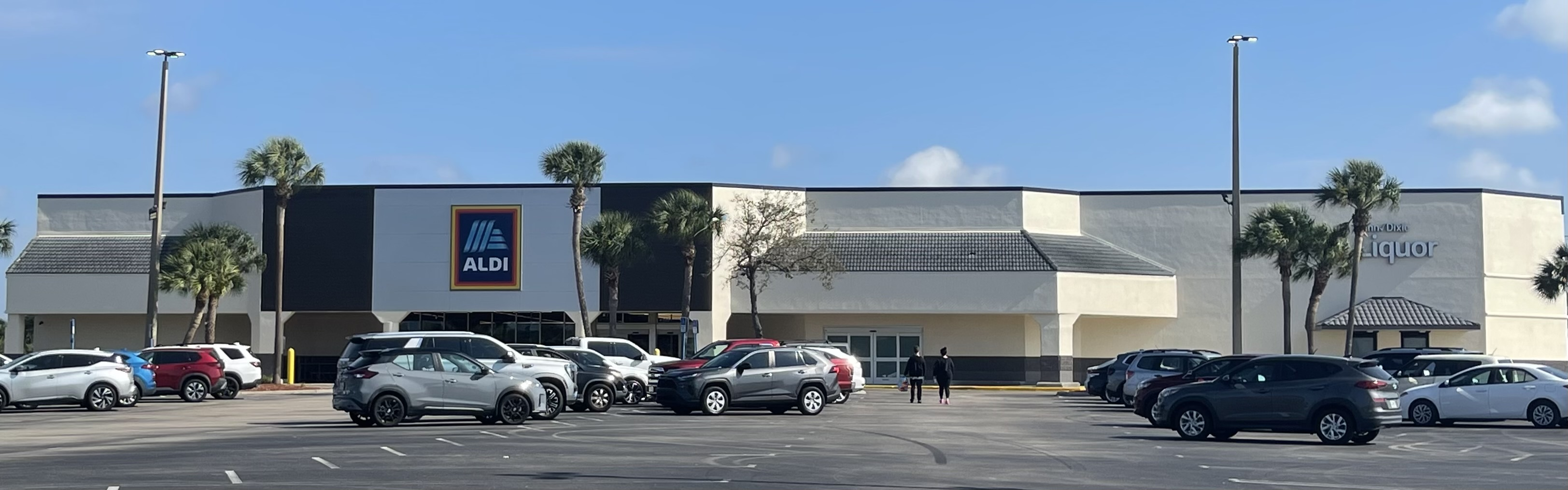
Former Winn-Dixie Supermarket in Englewood, Florida converted to Aldi, with attached Winn-Dixie Liquor store remaining.

On August 16, 2023, Southeastern Grocers entered into an agreement to sell 400 Winn-Dixie and Harvey's Supermarkets stores to German supermarket chain Aldi Süd. Stores will either remain open under the Winn Dixie or Harvey's brand or convert to the ALDI Süd format. The 28 Fresco y Mas stores and four stand-alone pharmacies were not part of the agreement with Aldi and will be operated by Fresco Retail Group, LLC.

In March 2024, it was reported that Aldi completed the purchase of Winn-Dixie's parent company. On February 7, 2025, Aldi sold the company with the inclusion of 170 Winn-Dixie stores of the approximately 400 stores and 170 of its liquor stores to a private consortium of investors that include C&S Wholesale Grocers. Winn-Dixie will continue to run the 220 stores from the sale to Aldi until each location is converted to the Aldi format with completion of all stores by 2027.

In 2025, Winn-Dixie announced the acquisition of former Hitchcock’s Markets in Williston, Keystone Heights and Alachua Florida. The Williston location was remodeled that year and opened in December 2025, with the three others expected to open late summer 2026.

=== The Winn-Dixie Company ===
In October 2025, it was announced that parent company Southeastern Grocers would change its name to The Winn-Dixie Company starting in early 2026. As part of the announcement, the company has stated intentions to exit markets outside of Florida and southern Georgia. The name change would occur on the morning of January 21, 2026, coinciding with a rebrand across Winn-Dixie's marketing and store designs, which were first teased at a November 2025 reopening.

== Other Davis involvements ==
The Davis brothers also became involved in Florida politics, supporting conservative causes. It is reported that their financial support helped George Smathers beat incumbent U.S. Senator Claude Pepper in 1950. Former U.S. Treasury Secretary Donald Regan is reported to have said of his financial guru, James E. Davis: "When J.E. calls, I listen." It is reported that after reading Booker T. Washington's Up From Slavery, James E. Davis began a program of Winn-Dixie supporting historically black colleges and universities.

The Davis brothers endowed the Stetson University School of Business Administration with a building, Davis Hall, which was dedicated in 1967. On the dedication plaque inside the building, below the names of the donors, was the inscription, "Learn management that you may produce or distribute goods and services to improve the living for the people and produce a good return on invested capital for investors."

In 1982, J.E. Davis spearheaded a $6 million corporate fund-raising drive and donated 140 acres of property to the Mayo Clinic in order to build a new facility in Jacksonville. The location opened in October 1986, and is still funded by the Davis family. The Davis family gave an additional 210 acres to the clinic in October 2022.

In 1984, the Davis family also donated $3 million to Jacksonville University. In 1998, another $10 million was given to finance the construction of the Davis College of Business & Technology building on its Arlington campus.

In the 1990s, Winn-Dixie gave a generous contribution to the Boy Scouts of America of the Central Florida Council, resulting in the renaming of Camp La-No-Che to Winn-Dixie Scout Reservation. Naming rights expired in 2007 and the name has since been changed.

The Davis family has also partnered with the PARC Group to develop the Nocatee planned community in Florida. The first residents arrived in 2006. Another community, called eTown, was announced in March 2019.

Winn-Dixie has been involved with sports sponsorships. It was the official supermarket of the Jacksonville Jaguars of the National Football League (NFL). The company also held the naming rights for the NASCAR O'Reilly Auto Parts Series race at Daytona International Speedway from 2003 to 2008 and since 2026, dubbing it the "Winn-Dixie 250".

== Locations ==
As of July 2026, Winn-Dixie has fully exited Alabama, Louisiana and Mississippi, with operations in Florida and Georgia.

== Brands ==
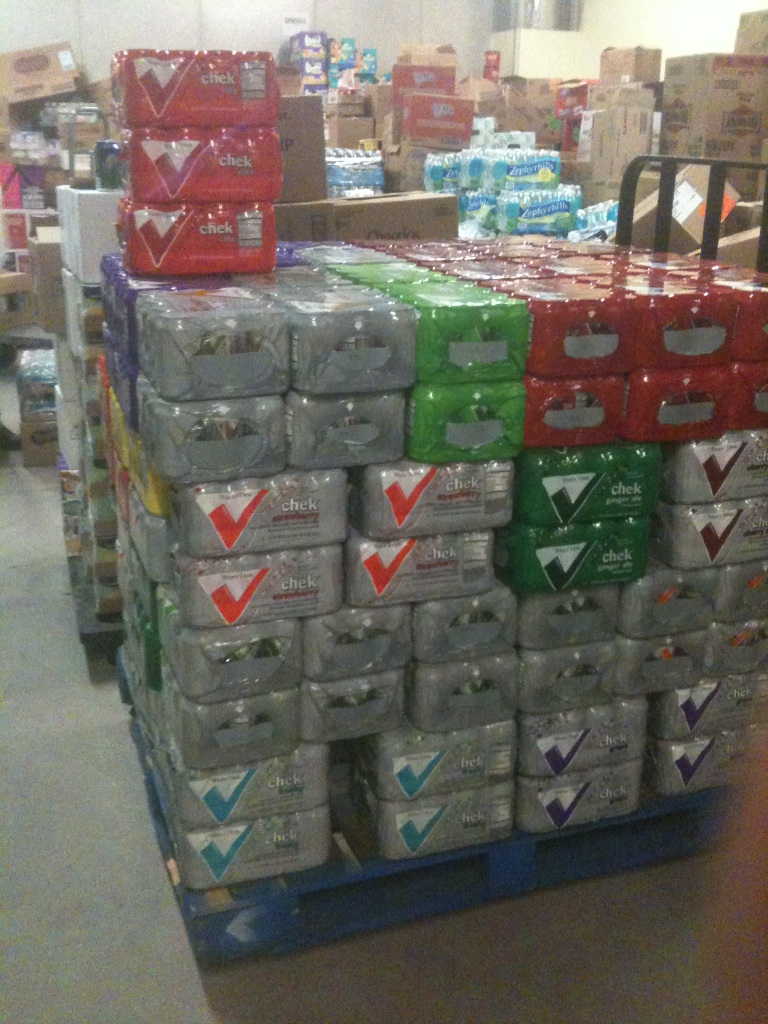
A pallet of Chek branded beverages

In 1956, Winn-Dixie introduced its first private label brand, Deep South. Since then, it has run over 60 brands, including Crackin' Good, Astor, Fisher, Superbrand, Thrifty Maid, Chek, and W-D Brand.

In 2003, the company cut the number down to a three-tier system of brands: the "Prestige" brand for upscale private label products, "Winn-Dixie" for its mainstream items, and "Thrifty Maid" for its value items. In 2007, all three brands received redesigned packaging with plans to replace the "Prestige" brand with "Winn & Lovett". In 2010, Winn-Dixie replaced its value-centered brand Thrifty Maid with Valu Time. Valu Time was replaced with Clear Value in 2012.

Beginning in 2016, SE Grocers began to transition to a unified private label brand under the "SE Grocers" brand, including SE Grocers Essentials for budget buys, SE Grocers for mid-market items, and SE Grocers Prestige for higher-end offerings. In July 2023, SE Grocers announced a new clean label called Know & Love. Other brands used by the company include TopCare, Fisherman's Wharf, Whiskers & Tails, Chek, Tippy Toes, Hickory Sweet, and WD Brand.
