= President's Council on Jobs and Competitiveness =

US presidential advisory body

The President's Council on Jobs and Competitiveness, originally the President's Economic Recovery Advisory Board (PERAB), was an ad hoc panel of non-governmental experts from business, labor, academia and elsewhere that President of the United States Barack Obama created on February 6, 2009. The board reported to Obama and his economic team on possible ways to improve the nation's economy. Obama announced this new board on November 26, 2008, and also announced that it would be chaired by former Federal Reserve chairman Paul Volcker with campaign economic adviser Austan Goolsbee as staff director and chief economist.

The council met a total of four times, with its final meeting on January 17, 2012. In 2013, the authorization for the council was not renewed, causing the council to be permanently shut down.

== Overview ==
The board followed the model of the President's Foreign Intelligence Advisory Board (PFIAB), which President Dwight Eisenhower established in 1956. Like the PFIAB, the advisory board was meant to pierce what Obama called the "insularity" of Washington decision-making processes. In announcing the board, Obama commented that "The walls of the echo chamber can sometimes keep out fresh voices and new ways of thinking – and those who serve in Washington don't always have a ground-level sense of which programs and policies are working."

The PERAB was intended to provide that ground-level sense, and Obama said that this mission was reflected in the board's diverse membership. Paul Krugman, a Nobel laureate in economics and noted progressive columnist, argued that, given the centrist makeup of Obama's economic inner circle, the new board could be used to "give progressive economists a voice." He mentioned James K. Galbraith, Larry Mishel of the Economic Policy Institute, Dean Baker, and Jared Bernstein as progressive economists who might be suitable for the board. Bernstein, however, was subsequently named to a full-time administration position as chief economist and economic policy adviser to Vice President Joe Biden.

According to an Obama transition press release, "The Board will be established initially for a two-year term, after which the President will make a determination on whether to continue its existence based on its continued necessity."

Austan Goolsbee, the board's chief economist, made an appearance on The Daily Show with Jon Stewart on August 19, 2009.

According to a March 25, 2009 press briefing by OMB Director Peter Orszag, the administration charged PERAB with proposing approaches to three budget related tasks: simplifying taxation, closing tax loopholes and reducing tax evasion, and reducing corporate welfare.

The board was renewed after its charter expired on February 6, 2011, with a new focus on economic competitiveness, with its name changing from The President's Economic Recovery Advisory Board to the President's Council on Jobs and Competitiveness. Volcker was replaced as head of the board by General Electric CEO Jeffrey Immelt – Volcker is not a part of the reconstituted board and was not consulted about its new makeup. In August 2011, Jeffrey Immelt announced that General Electric would create 11,000 onshore IT jobs.

== Council recommendations ==
The council released an interim report with a series of recommendations in October 2011. The report included five major initiatives to increase employment while improving competitiveness:

1. Measures to accelerate investment into job-rich projects in infrastructure and energy development;
2. A comprehensive drive to ignite entrepreneurship and accelerate the number and scale of young, small businesses and high-growth firms that produce an outsized share of America's new jobs;
3. A national investment initiative to boost jobs-creating inward investment in the United States, both from global firms headquartered elsewhere and from multinational corporations headquartered here;
4. Ideas to simplify regulatory review and streamline project approvals to accelerate jobs and growth; and,
5. Steps to ensure America has the talent in place to fill existing job openings as well as to boost future job creation.

== Criticism ==
Volcker was said to be disappointed in how the board was used as a public relations tool by the White House, saying that live broadcast of its meetings made honest discussion difficult. According to former U.S. Treasury deputy assistant secretary Joseph Engelhard, "They pretty much used him to look tough on regulation, and now they're done with him, they're saying goodbye."

== Members ==
The president and Volcker announced the board's membership on February 6, 2009. Members included:

- Jeff Immelt, council chair and General Electric CEO
- Ursula Burns, chairwoman and CEO of Xerox
- Steve Case, chairman and CEO of Revolution LLC and chairman of the Case Foundation
- Christopher Che, president and CEO, Hooven-Dayton Corporation
- Kenneth Chenault, chairman and CEO of American Express
- John Doerr, partner at Kleiner, Perkins, Caufield & Byers
- Roger W. Ferguson, Jr., president and CEO of the Teachers Insurance and Annuity Association – College Retirement Equities Fund (TIAA-CREF)
- Mark Gallogly, founder and managing partner at Centerbridge Partners L.P.
- Joseph Hansen, president of United Food and Commercial Workers International Union (UFCW)
- Lewis Hay, CEO of NextEra Energy
- Gary Kelly, chairman and CEO of Southwest Airlines
- Ellen Kullman, chairwoman and CEO, DuPont
- Eric Lander, founding director of the Broad Institute of MIT and Harvard
- Monica C. Lozano, director of Bank of America
- Jim McNerney, chairman and CEO of The Boeing Company
- Darlene Miller, owner and CEO of Permac Industries
- Paul Otellini, former president and CEO of Intel
- Richard Parsons, former chairman of Citigroup and the former chairman and CEO of Time Warner
- Penny Pritzker, chair and founder of Pritzker Realty Group and Classic Residence by Hyatt
- Brian L. Roberts, chairman and CEO of Comcast Corporation
- Matthew Rose, chairman and CEO of Burlington Northern Santa Fe Railway
- Sheryl Sandberg, COO of Facebook
- Richard L. Trumka, president of the AFL–CIO
- Laura D'Andrea Tyson, former chair of the Council of Economic Advisers during the Clinton Administration
- Robert Wolf, chairman and CEO of UBS Group Americas
