= Elderly care =

Care serving the needs of old people

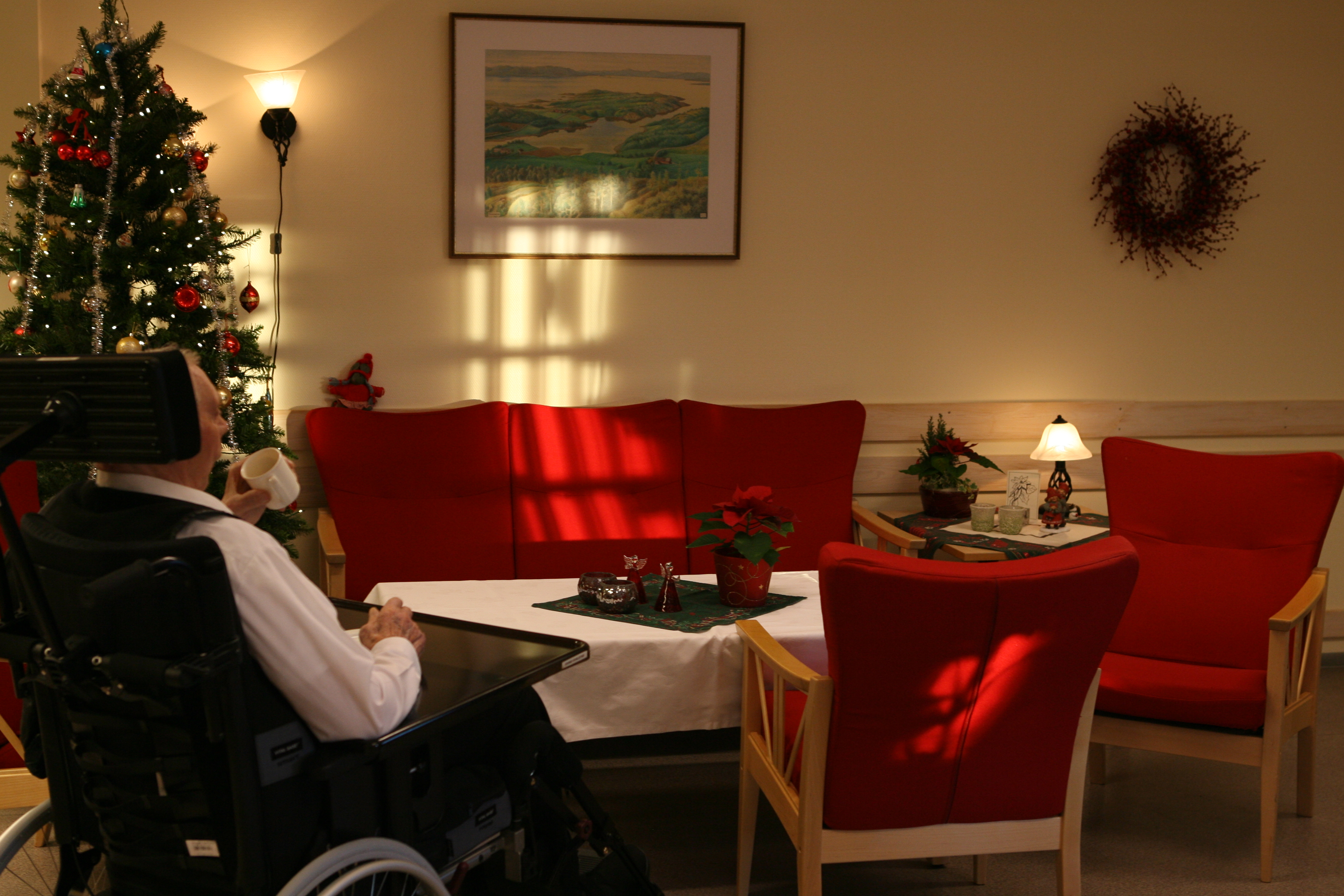
An old man at a nursing home in Norway

Elderly care, also known as eldercare or aged care, aims to serve the daily needs of old adults. It encompasses assisted living, adult daycare, long-term care, nursing homes (often called residential care), hospice care, and home care.

Elderly care emphasizes the social and personal requirements of senior citizens who wish to age with dignity while needing assistance with daily activities and healthcare. Elderly care can be unpaid such as by unpaid caregivers, or provided by businesses and organisations for a fee.

Eldercare includes a broad range of practices and institutions, as there is a wide variety of elderly care needs and cultural perspectives on the elderly throughout the world.

== Cultural and geographic differences ==
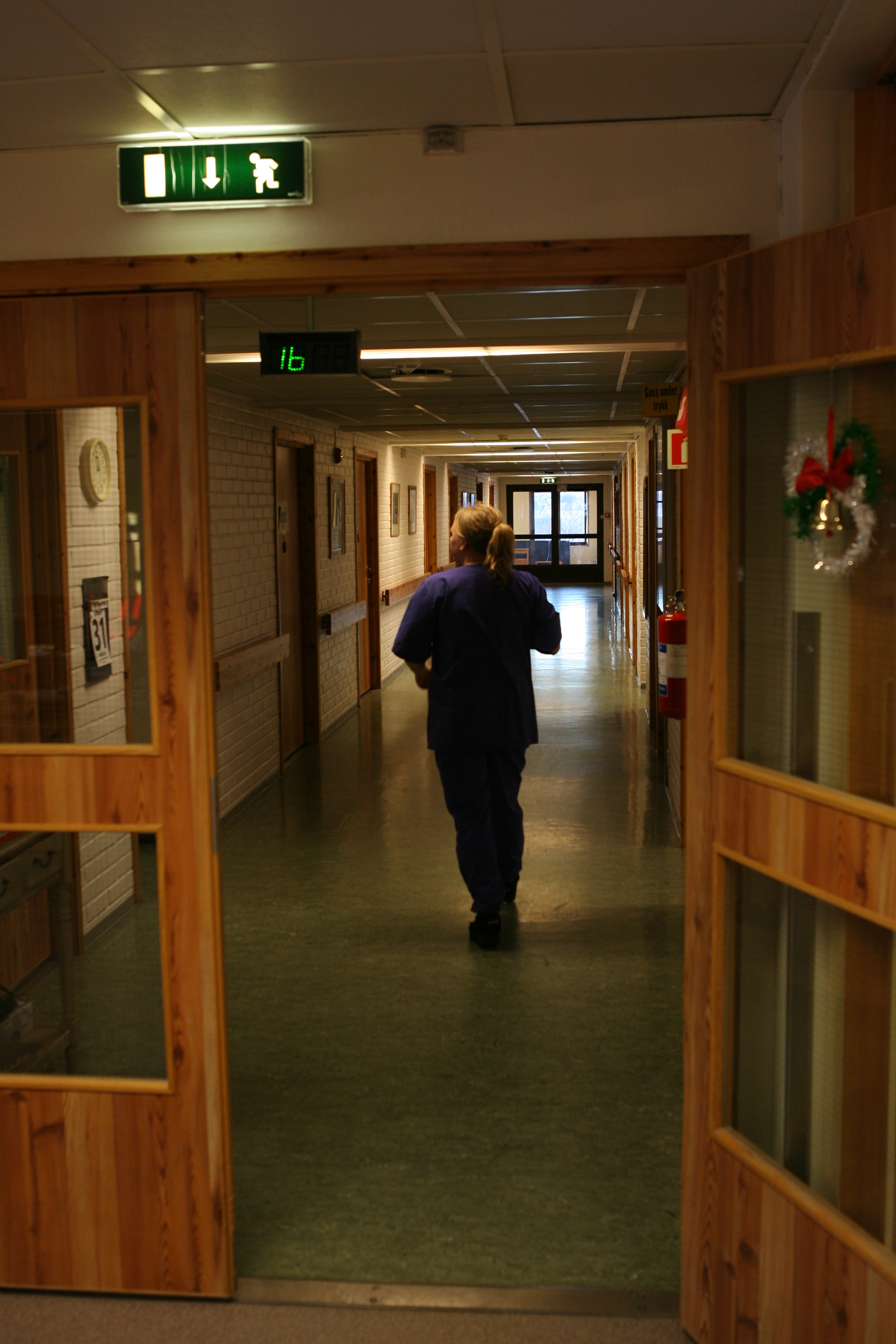
A nurse at a nursing home in Norway

The form of care provided for older adults varies greatly by country and even region, and is changing rapidly. Older people worldwide consume the most health spending of any age group. There is also an increasingly large proportion of older people worldwide, especially in developing nations with continued pressure to limit fertility and shrink families.

Traditionally, care for older adults has been the responsibility of family members and has been provided within the extended family home. In modern societies, care is increasingly provided by state or charitable institutions The reasons for this change include shrinking families, longer life expectancy and geographical dispersion of families. Although these changes have affected European and North American countries first, they are now increasingly affecting Asian countries.

In most western countries, care facilities for older adults are residential family care homes, freestanding assisted living facilities, nursing homes, and continuing care retirement communities (CCRCs). A family care home is a residential home with support and supervisory personnel by an agency, organization, or individual that provides room and board, personal care and habilitation services in a family environment for at least two and no more than six persons.

Due to the wide variety of elderly care needs and cultural perspectives on the elderly, there is a broad range of practices and institutions across different parts of the world. For example, in many Asian countries whereby younger generations often care for the elderly due to societal norms, government-run elderly care is seldom used in developing countries throughout Asia due to a lack of sufficient taxation necessary to provide an adequate standard of care, whilst privately-run elderly care in developing countries throughout Asia is relatively uncommon due to the stigma of exhibiting insufficient filial piety, having a relatively relaxed work–life interface and insufficient funding from family to pay for privately-run elderly care. However, institutional elderly care is increasingly adopted across various Asian societies, as the work–life interface becomes more constrained and people with increasing incomes being able to afford the cost of elderly care.

== Issues in elder care ==
There are major discrepancies within elder care. An important issue to acknowledge is who is taking care of the elderly primarily. In many households, this responsibility falls to family members. The issue that stems from the assumption that family will take care of the elderly is in many households the time spent with elder care can take away from time that would be spent providing for the family financially. This leads to larger disparities within socioeconomic class with the elderly.

=== Gender discrepancies in caregivers ===
An important issue here is also gender discrepancy amongst caregivers. There is a societal assumption often that leaves women in charge of caregiving primarily. Without access to other options for elder care, this leaves many women in a position that leads to higher rates of caregiver burnout. The issue lies in the fact that for many there is simply no other option for elder care than a member of the family stepping up. This can also lead to higher rates of neglect amongst elderly because families cannot afford adequate elderly care without external support.

According to Family Caregiver Alliance, the majority of family caregivers are women:

"Many studies have looked at the role of women as family caregivers. Although not all have addressed gender issues and caregiving specifically, the results are still generalizable [sic] to

- Estimates of the age of family or informal caregivers who are women range from 59% to 75%.
- The average caregiver is age 46, female, married and worked outside the home earning an annual income of $35,000.
- Although men also provide assistance, female caregivers may spend as much as 50% more time providing care than male caregivers."

=== Ageism ===
In hospitals, the elderly face the very real problem of ageism. For example, doctors and nurses often mistake symptoms of delirium for normal elderly behavior. Delirium is a condition that has hyperactive and hypoactive stages. In the hypoactive stages, elderly patients can just seem like they are sleeping or irritable. Hospital staff often overlook these symptoms which leads to decreased cognitive ability and PTSD from the hospital environment. The issue here is that the elderly often lack autonomy within the medical sphere as a result of delirium. Their behavior is often mistaken for hostility rather than a medical symptom. This level of prejudice only leads to worsening medical conditions for these individuals.

=== In developed nations ===
==== Australia ====
Total employment in residential care services in Australia (thousands of people) since 1984

Aged care in Australia is designed to make sure that every Australian can contribute as much as possible towards their cost of care, depending on their individual income and assets. That means that residents pay only what they can afford, and the Commonwealth government pays what the residents cannot pay. An Australian statutory authority, the Productivity Commission, conducted a review of aged care commencing in 2010 and reporting in 2011. The review concluded that approximately 80% of care for older Australians is informal care provided by family, friends and neighbours. Around a million people received government-subsidised aged care services, most of these received low-level community care support, with 160,000 people in permanent residential care. Expenditure on aged care by all governments in 2009-10 was approximately $11 billion.

The need to increase the level of care, and known weaknesses in the care system (such as skilled workforce shortages and rationing of available care places), led several reviews in the 2000s to conclude that Australia's aged care system needs reform. This culminated in the 2011 Productivity Commission report and subsequent reform proposals. In accordance with the Living Longer, Living Better amendments of 2013, assistance is provided in accordance with assessed care needs, with additional supplements available for people experiencing homelessness, dementia and veterans.

Australian Aged Care is often considered complicated due to various state and federal funding. Furthermore, there are many acronyms that customers need to be aware of, including ACAT, ACAR, NRCP, HACC, CACP, EACH, EACH-D and CDC (Consumer Directed Care) to name a few.

In 1944 Mildred Symons, a pioneer of elderly care in Australia, started the Church of England Parish Nursing Service and The Chesalon Nursing Home.

==== Canada ====
Private for-profit and not-for-profit facilities exist in Canada, but due to cost factors, some provinces operate or subsidize public facilities run by the provincial Ministry of Health. In public care homes, elderly Canadians may pay for their care on a sliding scale, based on annual income. The scale that they are charged on depends on whether they are considered for "Long Term Care" or "Assisted Living." For example, in January 2010, seniors living in British Columbia's government-subsidized "Long Term Care" (also called "Residential Care") started paying 80% of their after-tax income unless their after-tax income is less than $16,500. The "Assisted Living" tariff is calculated more simply as 70% of the after-tax income. As seen in Ontario, there are waiting lists for many long-term care homes, so families may need to resort to hiring home healthcare or paying to stay in a private retirement home.

==== United Kingdom ====
Care for the elderly in the UK has traditionally been funded by the state, but it is increasingly rationed, according to a joint report by the King's Fund and Nuffield Trust, as the cost of care to the nation rises. People who have minimal savings or other assets are provided with care either in their own home (from visiting carers) or by moving to a residential care home or nursing home. Larger numbers of old people need help because of an aging population and medical advances increasing life expectancy, but less is being paid out by the government to help them. A million people who need care get neither formal nor informal help.

A growing number of retirement communities, retirement villages or sheltered housing in the UK also offer an alternative to care homes but only for those with simple care needs. Extra Care housing provision can be suitable for older people with more complex needs. These models allow older people to live independently in a residential community or housing complex with other older people, helping to combat problems common amongst older people such as isolation. In these communities, residents may access shared services, amenities, and access care services if required.

Overall, retirement communities are privately owned and operated, representing a shift from a 'care as service' to 'care as business' model. Some commercially operated villages have come under scrutiny for a lack of transparency over exit fees or 'event fees'. It has been noted, however, that paying less now and more later may suit 'an equity-rich, yet cash-poor, generation of British pensioners.'

Although most retirement village operators are run for profit, there are some charitable organisations in the space: for example, the ExtraCare Charitable Trust, which operates 14 retirement villages mostly in the Midlands, is a registered charity. Charities may derive additional funding from sources such as statutory agencies, charity appeals, legacies, and income from charity shops. Surplus funds are used to support residents' housing, health and well-being programmes, and for the development of new villages to meet growing national demand.

There is also an increasing market in the UK for Home Care services, where a visiting carer attends an elderly person in their own home. Similarly, there are also introductory care agencies for people who want to hire a Live-in caregiver.

===== Extra Care =====
Extra Care housing usually involves provision of:

- Purpose-built, accessible housing design
- Safety and security e.g. controlled entry to the building
- Fully self-contained properties, where occupants have their own front doors, and legal status as tenants with security of tenure
- Tenants have the right to control who enters their home
- Office space for use by staff serving the scheme (and sometimes the wider community)
- Some communal spaces and facilities
- Access to care and support services 24 hours per day
- Community alarms and other assistive technologies.

==== United States ====
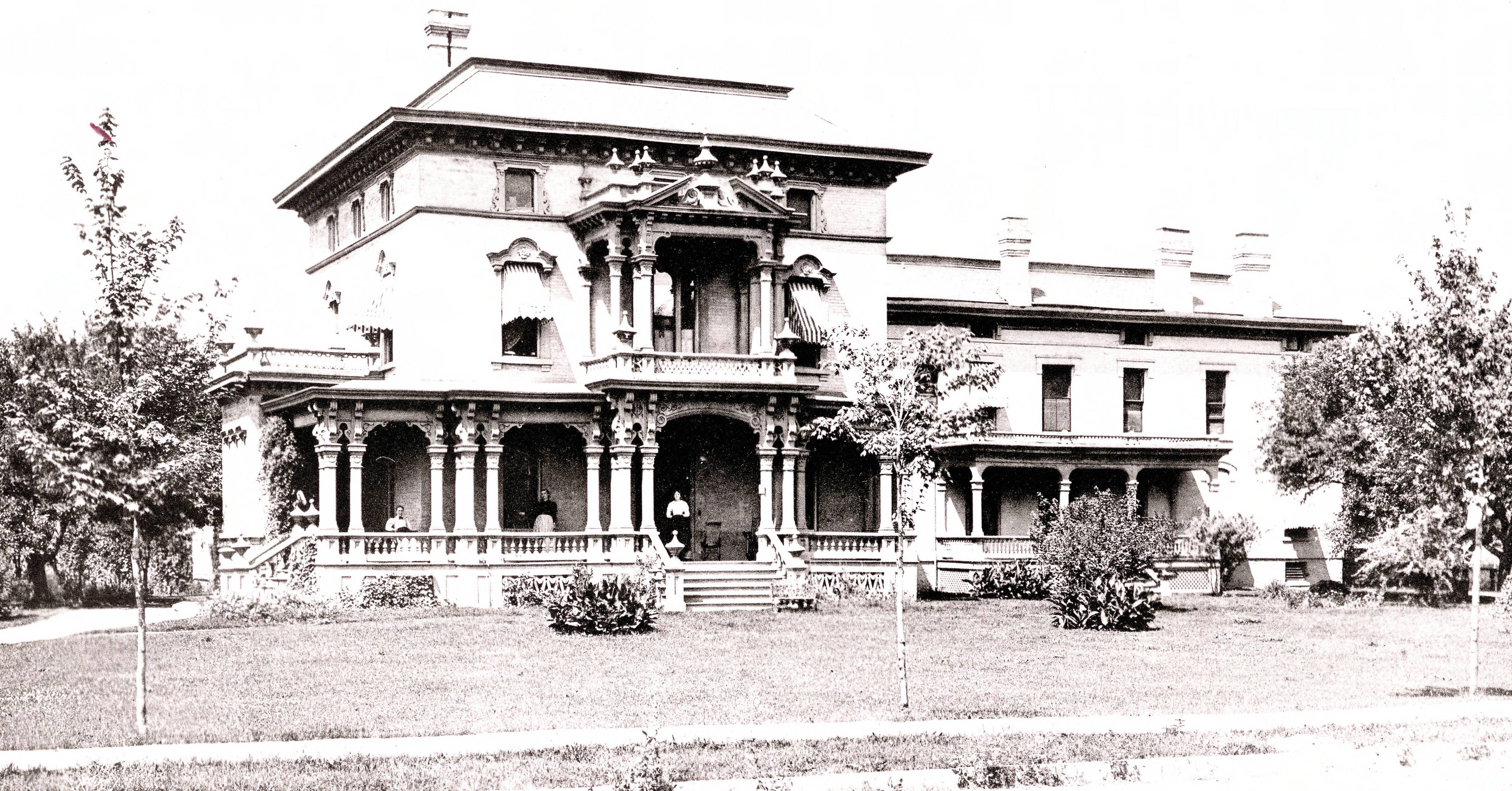
"Old Ladies Home" (sic) in Toledo, Ohio, 1895

According to the United States Department of Health and Human Services, the older population—persons 65 years or older—numbered 39.6 million in 2009. They represented 12.9% of the U.S. population, about one in every eight Americans. By 2030, there will be about 72.1 million older persons, more than twice their number in 2000. People aged over 65 years represented 12.4% of the population in the year 2000, but that is expected to grow to be 19% of the population by 2030. This means there will be more demand for elderly care facilities in the coming years. There were more than 36,000 assisted living facilities in the United States in 2009, according to the Assisted Living Federation of America. More than 1 million senior citizens are served by these assisted living facilities.

Last-year-of-life expenses represent 22% of all medical spending in the United States, 26% of all Medicare spending, 18% of all non-Medicare spending, and 25% of all Medicaid spending for the poor. A November 2020 study by the West Health Policy Center stated that more than 1.1 million senior citizens in the U.S. Medicare program are expected to die prematurely over the next decade because they will be unable to afford their prescription medications, requiring an additional $17.7 billion to be spent annually on avoidable medical costs due to health complications.

In the United States, most of the large multi-facility providers are publicly owned and managed as for-profit businesses. However, there are exceptions; the largest operator in the US is the Evangelical Lutheran Good Samaritan Society, a not-for-profit organization that manages 6,531 beds in 22 states, according to a study by the American Health Care Association in 1995.

Given the choice, most older adults would prefer to continue to live in their homes (aging in place). Many elderly people gradually lose functioning ability and require either additional assistance in the home or a move to an eldercare facility. Their adult children often find it challenging to help their elderly parents make the right choices. Assisted living is one option for the elderly who need assistance with everyday tasks. It costs less than nursing home care but is still considered expensive for most people. Home care services may allow seniors to live in their own home for a longer period of time. In the modern lifestyle, the concept of active ageing has gained a momentum among the elderly people.

The Program of All-Inclusive Care for the Elderly (PACE) is a health plan for older adults who require a nursing home level of care but prefer to continue living independently. Permanently recognized by Medicare and Medicaid in 1997, PACE is a comprehensive care model that covers Medicare and Medicaid benefits plus other services and supports, such as transportation to the local PACE center where participants receive primary care, therapy, meals, recreation, socialization, and personal care. PACE also provides home services such as personal care, equipment to improve safety, and nursing services.

One relatively new service in the United States that can help keep older people in their homes longer is respite care. This type of care allows caregivers the opportunity to go on a vacation or a business trip and to know that their family member has good quality temporary care. Also, without this help the elder might have to move permanently to an outside facility. Another unique type of care cropping in U.S. hospitals is called acute care of elder units, or ACE units, which provide "a homelike setting" within a medical center specifically for older adults.

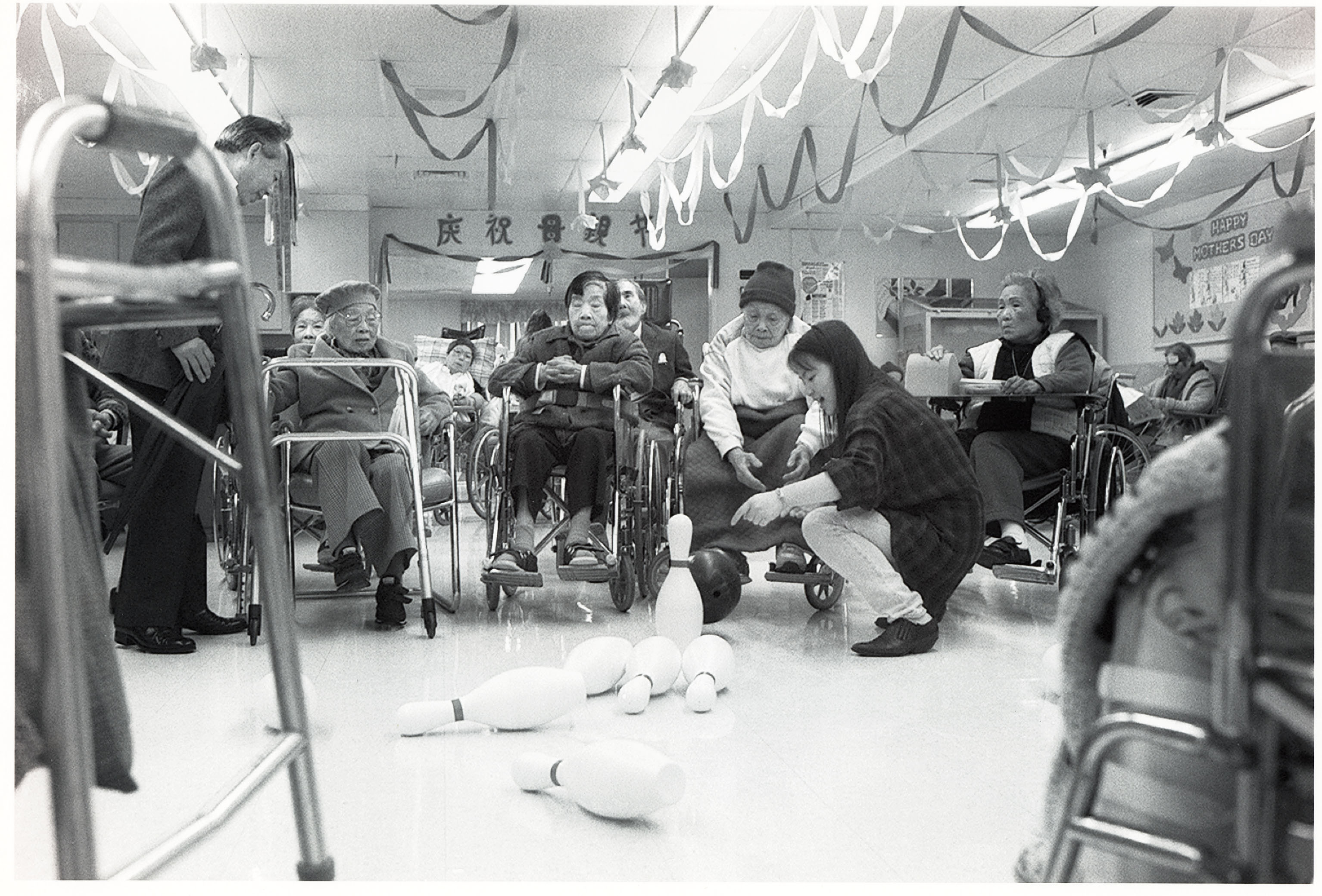
Staff at On Lok Senior Health Services interact with participants in their senior day care program in San Francisco's Chinatown, mid 1970s.

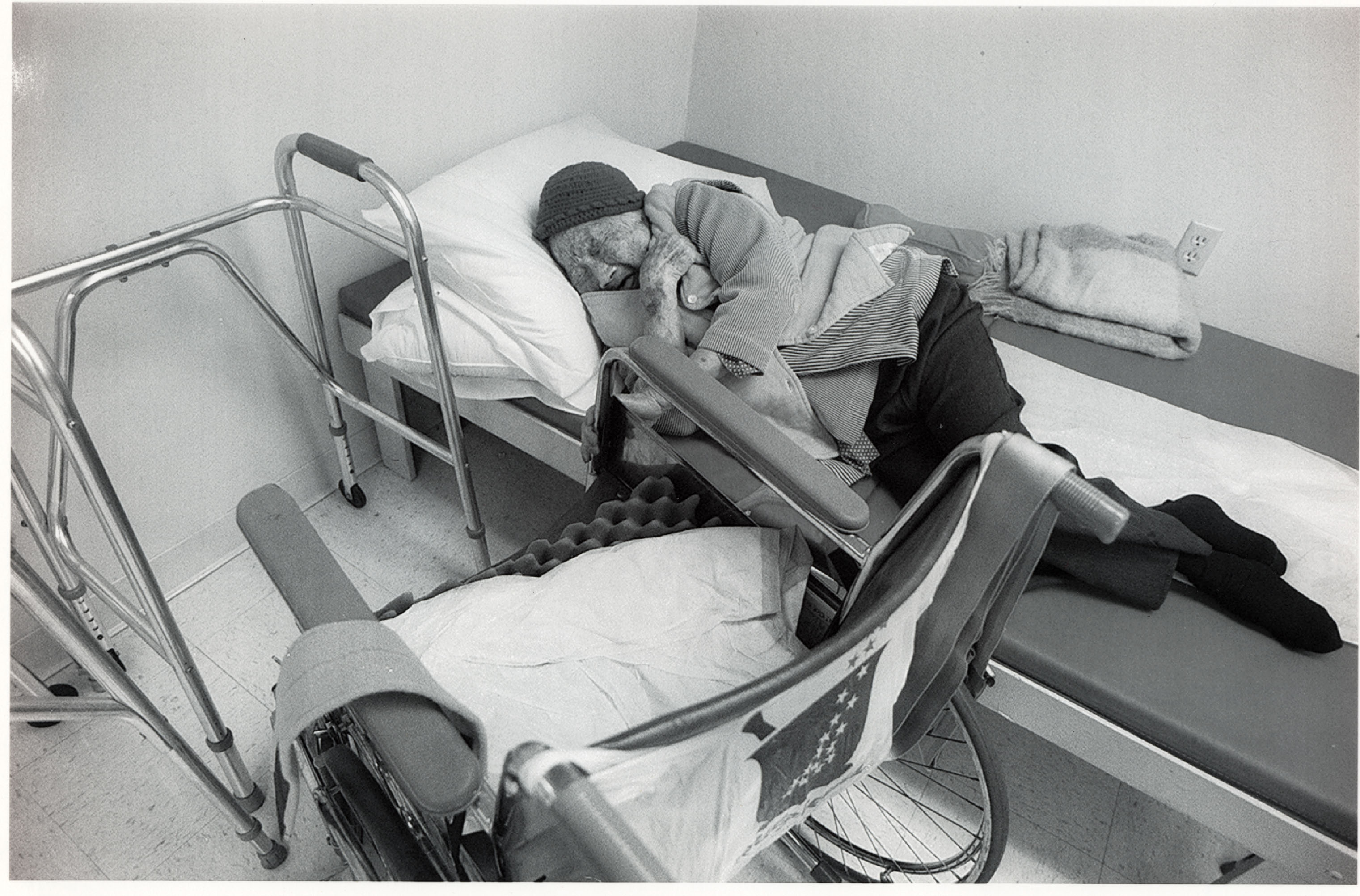
Senior at San Francisco's On Lok Senior Health Services at the Powell Street location takes a rest after social activities, mid 1970s.

Information about long-term care options in the United States can be found by contacting the local Area Agency on Aging, searching through ZIP code, or elder referral agencies such as Silver Living or A Place for Mom. Furthermore, the U.S. government recommends evaluation of health care facilities through websites using data collected from sources such as Medicare records.

=== In developing nations ===
==== China ====
Population ageing is a challenge across the world, and China is no exception. Due to the one-child policy, rural/urban migration and other social changes, the traditional long-term care for the elderly through direct family care is no longer sufficient. Both institutional and community-based services are expanding to meet the growing need. China needs to build these services and train staff.

==== India ====
In India, elderly citizens, especially men, are viewed in very high regard. Traditional values demand honor and respect for older, wiser people. Using data on health and living conditions from India's 60th National Sample Survey, a study found that almost a fourth of the elderly reported poor health. Reports of poor health were clustered among the poor, single, lower-educated, and economically inactive groups.

Under its eleventh Five-Year plan, the Indian government has made many strides. Article 41 of the Indian Constitution enjoins the State to make effective provisions for the elderly. One such provision is the Ayushman Bharat Yojana. Similarly, Court may make an order directing an individual to provide maintenance for elderly parents, in case of neglect or abandonment, under BNSS, 2023.

==== Malaysia ====
Malaysia is projected to become an ageing society around 2030, when Malaysians aged 60 and over are expected to make up about 15% of the population. Elderly care has traditionally been provided within the extended family, and there remains a strong cultural expectation that adult children support their ageing parents. Public provision for those without family support is delivered mainly through the Department of Social Welfare (Jabatan Kebajikan Masyarakat, JKM). JKM operates a small number of free residential welfare homes: eleven Rumah Seri Kenangan, in operation since 1950, house destitute older people who are able to care for themselves, while two Rumah Ehsan, at Kuala Kubu Bharu in Selangor and Dungun in Terengganu, provide free residential care for the destitute elderly who are bedridden or chronically ill. For older people who live at home, JKM also runs free Pusat Aktiviti Warga Emas (PAWE) day-activity centres for those aged 60 and above, numbering around 220 nationwide.

Most residential and nursing care, however, is provided by the private and non-governmental sector. Private care centres are registered with JKM under the Care Centres Act 1993, while private nursing homes offering medical care are licensed separately by the Ministry of Health under the Private Healthcare Facilities and Services Act 1998. Because fees at these facilities are met privately, access is shaped by income: the free welfare homes are means-tested and reserved for the destitute, leaving many middle-income families to rely on fee-charging private centres or on family caregiving.

==== Nepal ====
Due to health and economic benefits, the life expectancy in Nepal jumped from 27 years in 1951 to 65 in 2008. Most elderly Nepali citizens, roughly 85%, live in rural areas. Because of this, there is a significant lack of government sponsored programs or homes for the elderly. Traditionally, parents live with their children, and today, it is estimated that 90% of the elderly live in the homes of their families. This number is changing as more children leave home for work or school, leading to loneliness and mental problems in Nepali elderly.

The Ninth Five-Year Plan included policies in an attempt to care for the elderly left without children as caretakers. A Senior Health Facilities Fund has been established in each district. The Senior Citizens Health Facilities Program Implementation Guideline, 2061BS provides medical facilities to the elderly, free medicines as well as health care to people who are poverty stricken in all districts. In its yearly budget, the government has planned to fund free health care for all heart and kidney patients older than 75. Unfortunately, many of these plans are overly ambitious, which has been recognized by the Nepali government. Nepal is a developing nation and may not be able to fund all of these programs after the development of an Old Age Allowance (OAA). OAA provides a monthly stipend to all citizens over 70 years old and widows over 60 years old.

There are a handful of private daycare facilities for the elderly, but they are limited to the capital city. These day care services are very expensive and beyond the reach of the general public.

==== Thailand ====
Thailand has observed global patterns of an enlarging elderly class: as fertility control is encouraged and medical advances are being made, the birth rate has diminished and people live longer. The Thai government is noticing and concerned about this trend but tends to let families care for their elderly members rather than create extraneous policies for them. As of 2011, there are only 25 state-sponsored homes for the elderly, with no more than a few thousand members in each home. Such programs are largely run by volunteers and the services tend to be limited, considering there is not always a guarantee that care will be available. Private care is tough to follow, often based on assumptions. Because children are less likely to care for their parents, private caretakers are in demand. Volunteer NGOs are available but in very limited quantities.

While there are certainly programs available for use by the elderly in Thailand, questions of equity have risen since their introduction. The rich elderly in Thailand are much more likely to have access to care resources, while the poor elderly are more likely to use their acquired health care, as observed in a study by Bhumisuk Khananurak. However, over 96% of the nation has health insurance with varying degrees of care available.

== Elder abuse ==
The possibility of elder abuse is a continuing source of concern. The Adult Protective Services Agency, a component of the human service agency in most states, is typically responsible for investigating reports of domestic elder abuse and providing families with help and guidance. Other professionals who may be able to help include doctors or nurses, police officers, lawyers, and social workers.

== Shared-decision making ==
=== During primary care ===
There is currently limited evidence to form a robust conclusion that involving older patients with multiple health conditions in decision-making during primary care consultations has benefits. Examples of patient involvement in decision-making about their health care include patient workshops and coaching, individual patient coaching. Further research in this developing area is needed.

== Promoting independence ==
A survey by Price Market Research found that older adults are scared of losing their independence more than they fear death in America. Promoting independence in self-care can provide older adults with the capability to maintain independence longer and can leave them with a sense of achievement when they complete a task unaided. Older adults that require assistance with activities of daily living are at a greater risk of losing their independence with self-care tasks as dependent personal behaviours are often met with reinforcement from caregivers. It is important for caregivers to ensure that measures are put into place to preserve and promote function rather than contribute to a decline in status of an older adult that has physical limitations. Caregivers need to be conscious of actions and behaviors that cause older adults to become dependent on them and need to allow older patients to maintain as much independence as possible. Providing information to the older patient on why it is important to perform self-care may allow them to see the benefit in performing self-care independently. If the older adult is able to complete self-care activities on their own, or even if they need supervision, encourage them in their efforts as maintaining independence can provide them with a sense of accomplishment and the ability to maintain independence longer.

A study done by Langer and Rodin in 1976, investigated what the impacts could be if nursing home residents are given more responsibility in different daily activities, and more choices, compared if those responsibilities given to the nursing home staff. Residents in the nursing home were split into two different groups. One group of elderly residents was given more responsibility in their choices, and their day-to-day activities than the other group. This involved differences such as having the hospital administrator talked separately to the two groups. The group that was more responsibility induced was given a talk emphasizing their responsibility for themselves, while the talk given to the second group emphasized the responsibility of the nursing staff in taking care of the elderly residents. Another difference between the two groups is that both groups were given a plant. The group that was more responsibility induced was told they there were responsible for watering the plant each day while, the second group was told that the nursing staff was responsible for watering the plant. Results from this study indicated that the group that was more responsibility induced became more active, reported being happier, and increased alertness and they showed increased behavioral involvement in activities such as socializing, participation, and attendance in the nursing home activities such the nursing home's movie nights. They also showed higher health and mood which also declined more slowly than the previous group over time. It is also noted that these long-term benefits were most likely obtained because the treatment was not directed toward one single behavior or stimulus condition.

Elderly-friendly interior design plays a vital role in promoting independence among the elderly. The integration of Internet of Things (IoT) in smart homes provides a remote monitoring system to keep track of the daily activities of the elderly. Thus adults can live on their own confidently knowing that a feedback alarm will be sent to their caregivers immediately in case of an emergency. This not only allows the aging population to maintain their independence and confidence, but also brings peace of mind to their friends and family.

== Improving physical mobility ==
Impaired mobility is a major health concern for older adults, affecting 50% of people over 85 and at least a fourth of those over 75 years old. As adults lose the ability to walk, climb stairs, or rise from a chair, they become completely disabled. The problem cannot be ignored because people over 65 years old constitute the fastest growing segment of the population.

Therapy designed to improve mobility in elderly patients is usually built around diagnosing and treating specific impairments, such as reduced strength or poor balance. It is appropriate to compare older adults seeking to improve their mobility because athletes seeking to improve their split times. People in both groups perform best when they measure their progress and work toward specific goals related to strength, aerobic capacity, and other physical qualities. Someone attempting to improve an older adult's mobility must decide what impairments to focus on, and in many cases, there is little scientific evidence to justify any of the options. Today, many caregivers choose to focus on leg strength and balance. New research suggests that limb velocity and core strength may also be important factors in mobility. Assistive technology and advancements in the health care field are further giving elders greater freedom and mobility. Several platforms now use artificial intelligence to suggest assistive devices to the elder for a better match. Well planned exercise programs can reduce the rate of falls in older people if they involve multiple categories such as balance, functional and resistance exercise.

Family members are one of the most important caregivers to the elderly, often comprising the majority and most commonly being a daughter or a granddaughter. Family and friends can provide a home (i.e. host elderly relatives), help with money and meet social needs by visiting, taking them out on trips, etc.

One of the major causes of elderly falls is hyponatremia, an electrolyte disturbance in which the level of sodium in a person's serum drops below 135 mEq/L. Hyponatremia is the most common electrolyte disorder encountered in the elderly patient population. Studies have shown that older patients are more prone to hyponatremia as a result of multiple factors including physiologic changes associated with aging such as decreases in glomerular filtration rate, a tendency for defective sodium conservation, and increased vasopressin activity. Mild hyponatremia ups the risk of fracture in elderly patients because hyponatremia has been shown to cause subtle neurologic impairment that affects gait and attention, similar to that of moderate alcohol intake.

== Improving personal mobility ==
There are relatively few studies focusing on interventions to improve personal mobility of older adults living at home.

An elderly-friendly interior space can reduce mobility issues as well as other old-age issues. Staircase, lights, flooring etc can help elders combat mobility issues. Interior design can positively influence the physical and psychological wellness of the elderly, and if each area in house is designed for accommodation, it can let older adults live safely, comfortably and happily.

While navigating floors, climbing stairs is one of many challenges, and comes with a high risk of collapsing. A poorly designed staircase can negatively impact elders' psychology as they develop loss of confidence and fear of accidents. However, a staircase designed with the ergonomics and usage patterns of the elderly in mind, can make it easier for everyone. A stairlift can be a huge step to combat mobility issues.

Appropriate lighting in the interior space makes it easier for elders to move around in the house. An average 60-year-old person requires three times more illuminance than an average 20-year-old man. Windows, skylight and door openings can incorporate daylight into interior spaces. However, unplanned opening designs can lead to glare and increase the risk of falls and hinder their ability to perform daily tasks as the elderly are more sensitive to glare than young adults. Dual-layer curtains, drapes, window blinds, light shelves, low visual transmittance glazing or other shading systems can reduce glare. Illuminance can be increased by combining natural light with various kinds of artificial lights.

When a person slips due to mobility issues, the flooring material plays a major role in the level of impact the person experiences after falling. Choosing the right flooring material in homes depending on whether an individual uses a walker, a wheelchair, or a cane, can also resolve many of the mobility issues faced by adults due to decline in physical strength, loss of balance. For elders, tile flooring is the least preferred option. Carpet, cork, sheet vinyl flooring are some of the flooring options which can be used for bedrooms, kitchen and bathrooms used by elders. Tiles can be extremely slippery when they are wet which increases the risk of accidents. Also, they are very hard and cold on feet which makes it difficult to walk barefoot during winters.

=== Legal issues about incapacity ===
Legal incapacity is an invasive and sometimes, difficult legal procedure. It requires that a person file a petition with the local courts, stating that the elderly person lacks the capacity to carry out activities that include making medical decisions, voting, making gifts, seeking public benefits, marrying, managing property and financial affairs, choosing where to live and who they socialize with. Most states' laws require two doctors or other health professionals to provide reports as evidence of such incompetence and the person to be represented by an attorney. Only then can the individual's legal rights be removed, and legal supervision by a guardian or conservator be initiated. The legal guardian or conservator is the person to whom the court delegates the responsibility of acting on the incapacitated person's behalf and must report regularly his or her activities to the court.

A less restrictive alternative to legal incapacity is the use of "advance directives," powers of attorney, trusts, living wills and healthcare directives. The person who has such documents in place should have prepared them with their attorney when that person had capacity. Then, if the time comes that the person lacks capacity to carry out the tasks laid out in the documents, the person they named (their agent) can step in to make decisions on their behalf. The agent has a duty to act as that person would have done so and to act in their best interest.

== See also ==
- Food preferences in older adults and seniors
- Friendly caller program
- Gerontology
- Home automation for the elderly and disabled
- Social impact of the COVID-19 pandemic#Elderly care
- Transgenerational design
