= Fedele =

Fedele is both an Italian surname and a masculine Italian given name. Notable people with this name include:

== People with the surname ==
- Adriano Fedele (born 1947), Italian football player and manager
- Cassandra Fedele (died 1558), Italian scholar
- Ivan Fedele (born 1953), Italian composer
- Joe Fedele, American businessman
- Matteo Fedele (born 1992), Swiss footballer
- Michael Fedele (born 1955), American politician
- Pietro Fedele (1873–1943), Italian historian and politician

== People with the given name ==
- Fedele Fenaroli (1730–1818), Italian composer
- Fedele Fischetti (1732–1792), Italian painter
- Fedele de Giorgis (1887–1964), Italian general
