= Mark Gallogly =

American investor

Personal details
- Born: January 18, 1957 (age 69)
- Education: University of Notre Dame (BA); Columbia University (MBA)

Mark T. Gallogly (born 1957) is an American private equity investor, philanthropist, climate change advocate and major donor to Democratic candidates and causes. He co-founded and served as managing principal of the private investment firm Centerbridge Partners until his retirement in 2020. Under the Obama administration, he served on two presidential advisory councils.

== Early life and education ==
Gallogly was born on January 18, 1957, in Providence, Rhode Island, to Florence E. (Giblin) Gallogly and Edward P. Gallogly. Gallogly is the eighth of eleven children. His parents were each the children of Irish immigrants and were first-generation college graduates. Gallogly's father served as Lieutenant Governor of Rhode Island, United States Attorney for the District of Rhode Island and Chief Judge of the Rhode Island Family Court. Gallogly graduated with honors from the University of Notre Dame in 1979. As an undergraduate, he also studied at Sophia University in Tokyo. He received an MBA from Columbia Business School in 1986.

== Career ==
Gallogly spent his early career in the Acquisition Finance Group at Manufacturers Hanover Trust Company. He received his MBA at Columbia Business School through a professional development program offered by Manufacturers Hanover. He joined the Blackstone Group in 1989, where he rose to become head of private equity and served on the firm's management and investment committees.

In 2005, Gallogly co-founded Centerbridge Partners with Jeff Aronson. The name of the firm originated with the concept of bridging Gallogly's private equity expertise and Aronson's credit investing background. In 2007 he helped create the Centerbridge Foundation with a stated mission to increase access to educational and economic opportunities in the communities where Centerbridge Partners has offices.

In 2015 Gallogly and his wife, Lise Strickler, founded Three Cairns Group, a multi-strategy firm engaged in addressing the climate crisis through venture investing, philanthropy and public policy advocacy. Three Cairns Group's work also includes equitable access to education, mental health services, and careers.

== Public service ==
Under President Barack Obama, Gallogly served on the President's Economic Recovery Advisory Board, chaired by Paul Volcker, from 2008 to 2010, and the Council on Jobs and Competitiveness, chaired by Jeff Immelt, from 2010 to 2012. Gallogly was active on the regulatory reform working group of the Jobs Council. In 2021, he joined a climate team formed by U.S. Special Presidential Envoy for Climate John Kerry to engage the private sector in decarbonization efforts. He left after helping establish connections with major financial institutions.

=== Board seats and council memberships ===
- Vice-chair of the Board of Trustees of Columbia University
- Columbia Climate School Board of Advisors
- Member of the World Bank Private Sector Investment Lab
- Member of the Advisory Council for the Hamilton Project, an economic policy initiative of the Brookings Institution
- Member of the Council on Foreign Relations

== Personal life ==
Gallogly married Lise Strickler, a climate and environmental advocate, in September 1987. Gallogly and Strickler met in the MBA program at Columbia Business School. They have three children and reside in New York City. As of 2021, Gallogly and his wife had donated nearly $12 million to Democrats since 1992, including $5 million to Joe Biden and other Democrats in the 2020 United States elections. He has been a supporter of the Joe Biden 2024 presidential campaign, hosting a campaign fundraiser at his Central Park West home in 2023.
