= FreshDirect =

Online grocery delivery service in the US

Coordinates: 40°48′3″N 73°55′10″W

- Type: Private
- Industry: Online grocer
- Founded: 1999; 27 years ago
- Founders: Joe Fedele; Jason Ackerman
- Key people: Dave Bass; (Managing Director); Dickson Aladesanmi; (Chief Financial Officer)
- Revenue: ▲$600 million (2019)
- Number of employees: 3,000
- Parent: Getir (2023–present)
- Website: www.freshdirect.com

FreshDirect is an American online grocery company and among the first enterprises to sell and deliver perishable foods to consumers without maintaining a retail operation. It offers its services via a website and mobile app.

On December 15, 2023, it was announced that Getir had completed the acquisition of the company.

== Overview ==
Established in New York City, the firm serves the New York metropolitan region as well as parts of Central New Jersey, Southern Connecticut, and Eastern Long Island. As of 2022, FreshDirect serves about 21 counties in the New York tristate area.

FreshDirect custom-packages groceries and meals using just-in-time manufacturing, a practice that reduces waste, and improves quality and freshness. The company was an early proponent of the move towards food sustainability and rapidly grew in popularity by catering to an urban, socially-conscious consumer.

FreshDirect focuses on reducing the time it takes for food to move from its source to the end user by buying directly from farms, emphasizing organic food and locally grown items. It also stocks and delivers numerous kosher foods and is recognized by the Marine Stewardship Council as a certified sustainable seafood vendor.

== History ==
=== 1999–2012: Founding and initial growth ===
The company was founded in 1999 by former Fairway Market CEO Joe Fedele and Jason Ackerman, a former investment banker who specialized in the grocery industry. At the time, the concept of an online grocer had already been attempted, most notably by Webvan which "flamed out... having spent almost $1 billion" in their attempt to create a supply chain and distribution system that could scale.

Introduced to the New York market in 2002, FreshDirect's business grew popular for its convenience, fresh food and comparatively lower prices than many Manhattan supermarkets although about 20% more than supermarkets in the boroughs. Fedele initially served as CEO until his departure in 2004. Ackerman, who had been serving as CFO, took over day-to-day responsibilities along with Dean Furbush, the COO. At the time, the company was generating $2 million in weekly sales.

==== Richard Braddock ====
In 2005, Richard Braddock was named as chairman of FreshDirect. He had significant experience leading e-commerce companies, having led Priceline from 1998 to 2004. Braddock took on the role of CEO in March 2005. Some speculated that his hiring signaled a move towards an initial public offering.

FreshDirect experienced significant customer quality issues in its early years. Prior to 2008, 85 percent of its new customers only placed one or two orders before abandoning the service. In early 2008, FreshDirect fired its CEO, and gave that title to Braddock, who "served as chairman and CEO of Fresh Direct from March, 2008" through early 2011.

FreshDirect changed strategies, discontinuing solicitations of new customers for two years while it focused on improving customer service. The company also implemented real-time data reports in order to monitor and quickly correct customer service issues. The company's new strategy worked, and by 2010, a majority of its revenue was derived from 45,000 to 50,000 repeat customers. By 2013, the company had 250,000 customers and $400 million in annual sales, and was being described internationally as a "home delivery success story."

In a sudden move, Peter Ackerman, who held the majority of shares of the company, called Braddock in February 2011, complaining that the date of the board meeting had been changed without his notice. Two days later, the board fired Braddock, who did not receive severance and lost his $6.5 million investment in the business. Three weeks later, Ackerman installed his nephew, Jason Ackerman, as CEO. Braddock sued the company in July 2012. In legal filings, Peter Ackerman claims that the board had already agreed to seek a new CEO and that he was exercising his right as majority shareholder to dismiss directors.

==== Morrisons investment ====
In 2011, UK retailer Wm Morrison bought a 10% stake in the company in order to learn about online shopping and launch its long-awaited online shopping service in the UK. Using the investment to gain access to FreshDirect's operations, Morrisons reported in 2013 that it had "learned a lot about the economics of picking and delivery of food" as well as its reputation-building strategy. In March 2014, Morrisons announced that it would divest its stake in FreshDirect as part of a restructuring effort. In August 2016, Morrisons sold their 10% stake in FreshDirect for $58 million (£45 million).

==== Regional expansion of services ====
FreshDirect expanded its service area slowly. It began service in parts of Manhattan, Brooklyn, and Queens in 2002, but by 2010 it still had not covered the entire New York City area. The company began testing service in select parts of Connecticut and New Jersey in 2010. Although had it served some parts of the Bronx earlier, FreshDirect did not offer service to all of the borough until 2012.

As early as 2010, FreshDirect began looking to expand from the New York City metropolitan area into additional East Coast markets such as Boston, Philadelphia, or Washington, D.C. It also considered that suburbs, while being more distant and requiring paying tolls, would only need one driver, and with a greater percentage of families, would yield more positive results.

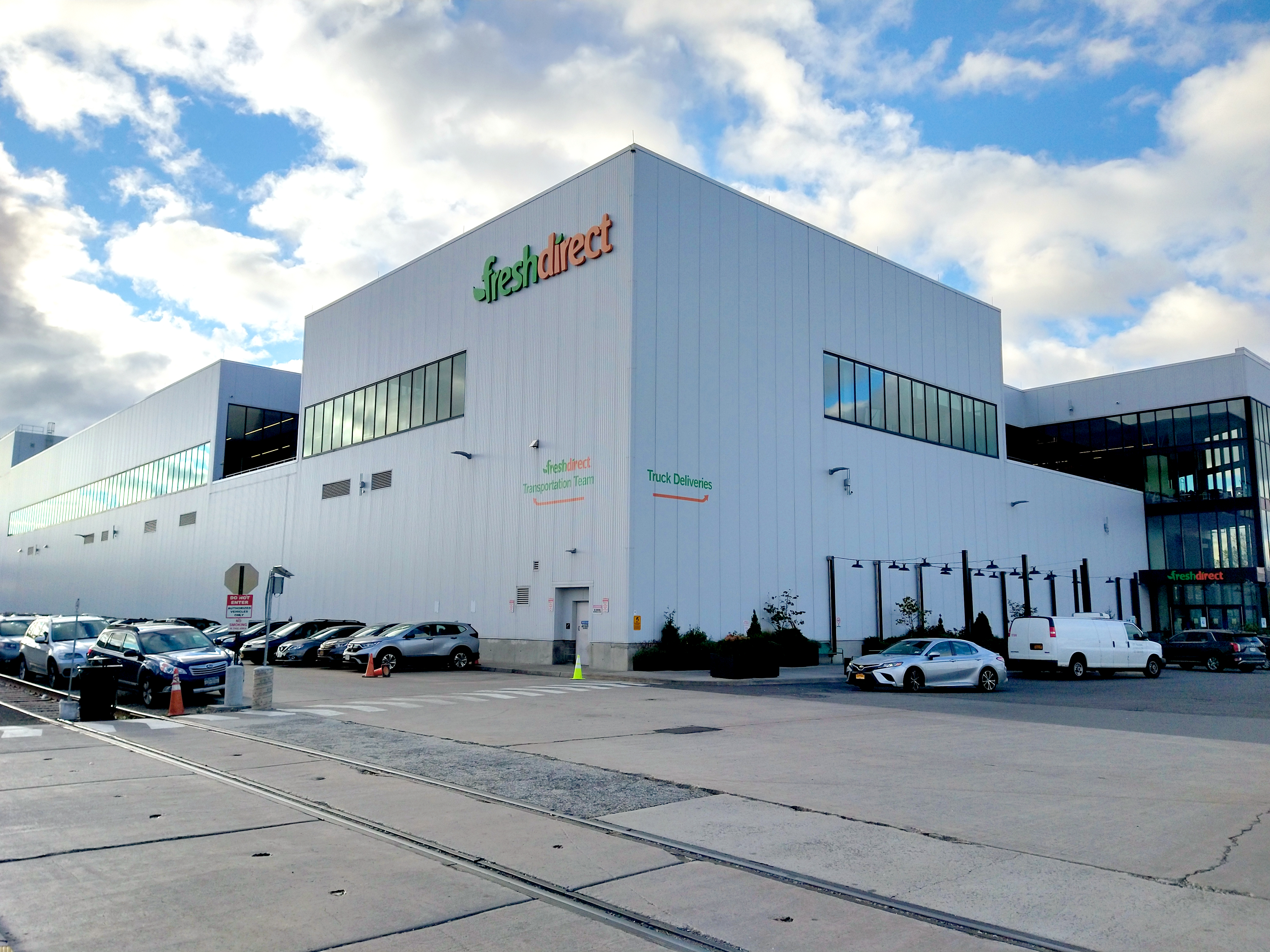
FreshDirect Bronx warehouse and headquarters

=== 2013–2020: Move to The Bronx, market expansion, acquisition ===
In January 2013, FreshDirect officially launched service in the greater Philadelphia metropolitan area. In September of the same year, the company expanded services to parts of Delaware.

In 2014, the company broke ground on a 500,000-square-foot (46,000 m^{2}) distribution hub and corporate headquarters at Harlem River Yards in the Bronx. The new facility was forecast to expand the company's operations capacity and create 1,000 additional jobs.

In 2016, the company secured $189 million in outside funding at a valuation of $600 million. At the time it was the biggest round of fundraising in the company's 17-year history. The investment was led by J.P. Morgan Asset Management, with W Capital and AARP Innovation Fund investing as well. In conjunction with the investment, two J.P. Morgan executives joined the company's board. That same year the company expanded through the launch of FoodKick, an on-demand grocery delivery service providing a selection of essential food items and alcohol within one hour.

Early in 2017, FreshDirect, along with Amazon and other online grocery companies, began a two-year pilot program with the US Department of Agriculture. The program was designed to extend online delivery to low-income customers by accepting payment through the Supplemental Nutrition Assistance Program (SNAP). As part of the program, customers could only use SNAP to pay for eligible items, not service or delivery fees.

The company expanded its geographical footprint in March 2017 to include delivery to Washington, DC; the surrounding towns of Arlington and McLean, Virginia; and Bethesda, Maryland. Prior to the expansion, FreshDirect had maintained a warehouse in Prince George's County, Maryland. At the time of the announcement, the company pledged to deliver food from its source directly to a customer's home in five days, which was roughly half the time of traditional supermarkets. As part of the expansion, the company began carrying a selection of regional foods including shellfish from the Chesapeake Bay, beef from Maryland, and chicken from the nearby Shenandoah Valley. About 50 additional employees were hired.

In July 2018, the company formally opened its administrative and warehouse center in the Bronx. The event was attended by local political leaders as well as New York Senator Senator Chuck Schumer. At the same time, FreshDirect experienced a number of reliability problems that damaged its reputation and cost the company market share. Many of these problems were traced back to issues within the Bronx warehouse. While what The New York Times called "Stages a Comeback" did not bring back 2017's 66% share of market, FreshDirect was still holding a 46% share, more than double that of the next largest competing firm.

Just months later, in September 2018, co-founder and CEO Jason Ackerman suddenly resigned. David McInerney was named as Ackerman's replacement and was added to the board of directors. McInerney was among the original co-founders of FreshDirect. He had previously served as FreshDirect's chief merchandising officer. He initially joined FreshDirect as a chef, creating the kitchen, bakery, and pastry operations in 2000. A graduate of the Culinary Institute of America at Hyde Park, McInerney had worked in the kitchens of noted chefs including Bernard Loiseau and David Bouley early in his career. Under McInerney's guidance, FreshDirect developed relationships with suppliers to move food quickly from its source to the customer. One such effort was the Montauk Dayboat Fishing Program, which launched in 2004 through a partnership with a fish market in Montauk, New York.

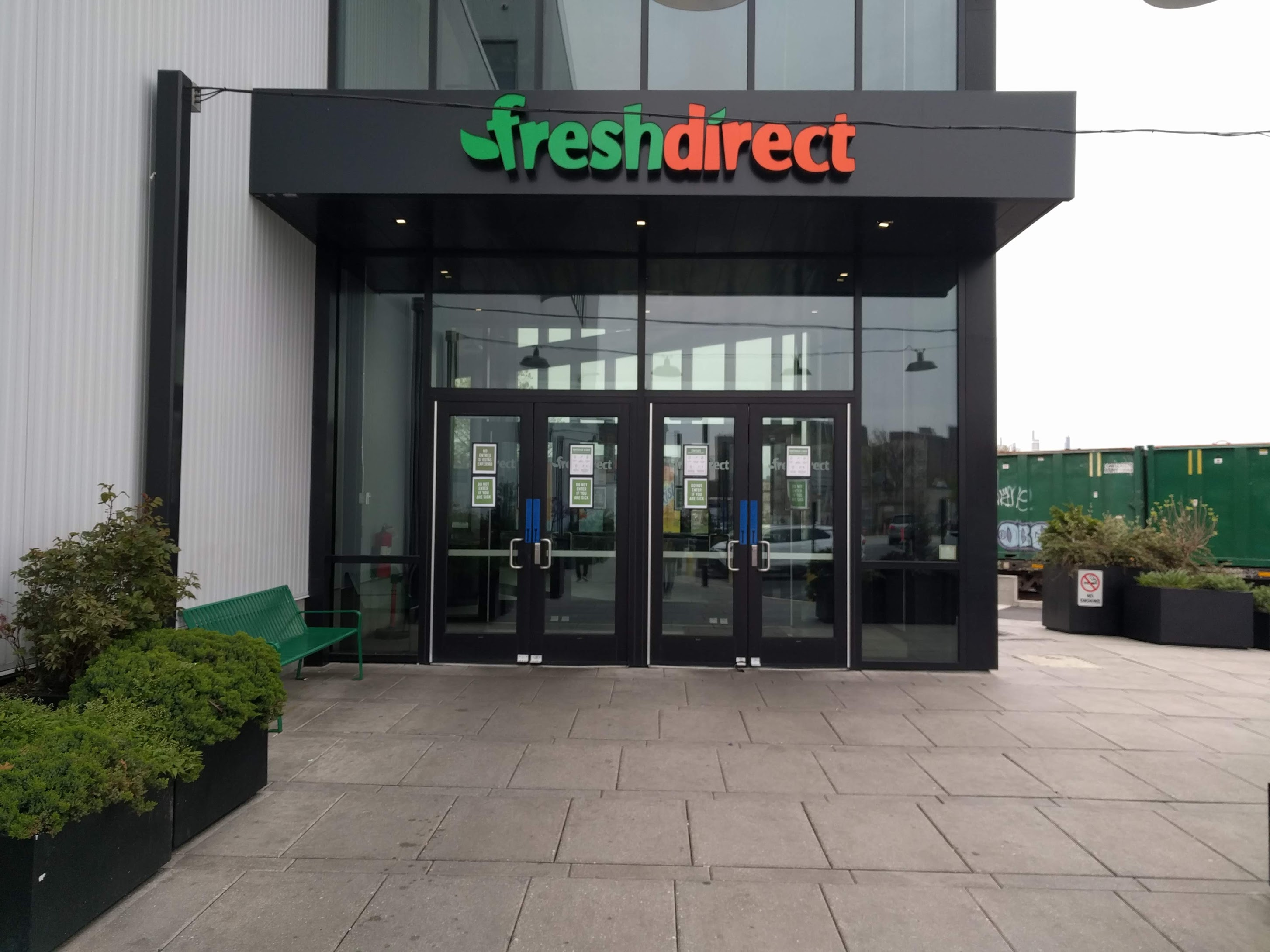
FreshDirect headquarters

As of 2019, FreshDirect held 68% of the online grocery delivery market share in New York City. Other competitors included Instacart (13%), Peapod (9%) and Amazon Fresh (9%).

==== Acquisition ====
In the fall of 2020, Netherlands-based food retailer Ahold Delhaize announced their intention to acquire a controlling interest in the company. Centerbridge Partners, a private equity firm, would hold 20% of FreshDirect, which would retain its brand identity and continue to operate its Bronx warehouse and headquarters.

Following the acquisition, Dave Bass was named managing director of FreshDirect, replacing McInerney. Bass was charged with overseeing all operations including budgeting and setting growth targets. Bass previously led merchandising for Peapod Digital Labs, a unit of Ahold Delhaize USA. He also had senior positions at Food Lion and Hannaford Bros.

In August 2022 the company ended service to Philadelphia and Washington, DC.

In November 2023, Getir acquired FreshDirect at an undisclosed price.

==== Seasonal Service ====
In 2021, FreshDirect launched a service to deliver alcohol to popular vacation destinations in the New York region during the summer months. The service, called the Rosé Express, guaranteed two-hour delivery of wine, beer, and spirits to customers in the Hamptons and Montauk communities as well as Bellport, Shelter Island, and the North Fork on Long Island. The service covers towns along the Jersey Shore as well as Long Beach Island.

== Operations and technology ==
=== Ordering, picking and packing ===
FreshDirect uses Manhtattan WMS to process thousands of orders placed on its 24/7 website every night. The site is configured to handle up to 18,000 simultaneous shopping sessions.

Originally, orders placed through the website were dispatched to the kitchen, bakery, and deli as well as fresh storage rooms, produce ripening rooms and production areas within the company's refrigerated facility. All order components were custom-cut, packaged, weighed and priced. In the case of dry goods or frozen foods, items were picked from storage before being placed inside bins that travel along conveyors to the sorting area. There, products in a customer's order were scanned and gathered in corrugated fiberboard boxes. The boxes were labeled, recorded and loaded into refrigerated delivery trucks. Other software optimized for how much was going where.

From 1999 through 2018, the company's base of operations was a 300,000-square-foot (28,000 m^{2}) warehouse and administrative building in Long Island City, New York. Though the website and plant processes were in development for several years before its public launch, the company made its first deliveries to Roosevelt Island on July 11, 2002.

=== Bronx warehouse ===
The company's move to the Bronx in 2018 allowed for the implementation of a number of system improvements to enhance the quality and efficiency of food deliveries. At 400,000 square feet, the Bronx distribution center is significantly larger than the prior facility, allowing for individually temperature-controlled areas for meat, seafood, produce, deli, bakery and prepared food items. The facility also houses 15 different temperature zones, including a specific freezer room for premium ice cream, and refrigerated rooms for bananas, tomatoes, and onions. Personal shoppers work daily with the same 20 to 30 fresh products. An internal quality-control app monitors, tracks and shares ratings of every fresh item. Beginning in 2018, the company eliminated use of cardboard boxes and transitioned to 100% recyclable woven bags for deliveries, saving more than 10 million cardboard boxes annually.

Conveyor belts in the warehouse run for almost nine miles (14 km) throughout the packaging area. A bin typically travels for 25 to 30 minutes on a conveyor belt during the picking and packing process. The Bronx distribution hub is equivalent in size to 50 grocery stores, allowing for greater efficiency when reallocating perishable items to local food relief partners including City Harvest and the Food Bank for New York City.

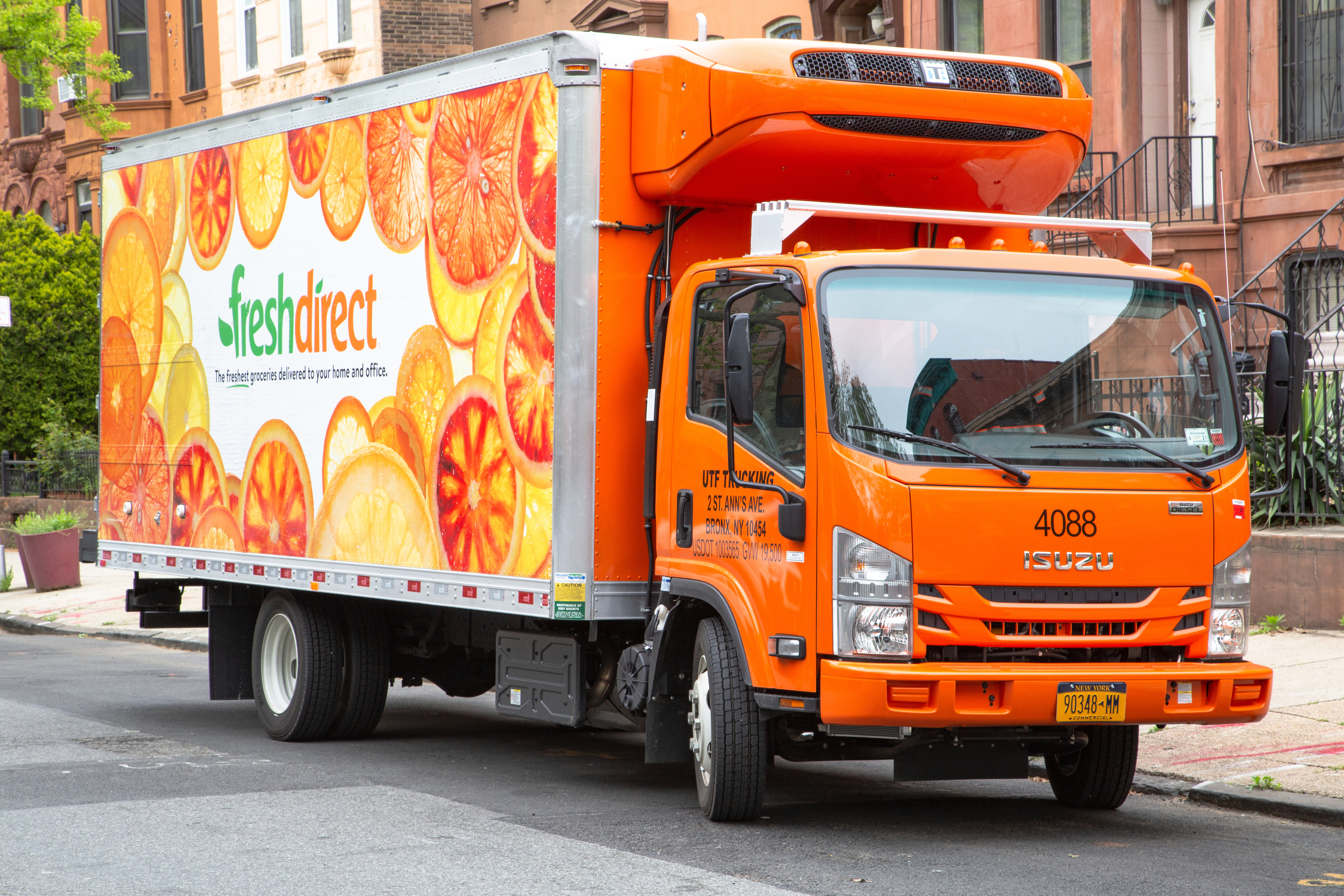
FreshDirect truck making deliveries in NYC

=== Truck fleet and deliveries ===
FreshDirect maintains a fleet of more than 300 vehicles ranging in size from box trucks to tractor trailers. Many are outfitted with custom features including frozen zones, special shelving for grocery orders and tri-fold rear doors with steps on the rear platforms. The company uses a system on its trucks that includes GPS, safety warnings, notifications and alerts. These systems monitor the way trucks are driven to ensure that drivers are operating safely and limiting product damage.

The fleet uses multiple forms of fuel, including electric, biodiesel, and CNG. In 2015, the company was cited by the US Environmental Protection Agency for its efforts to significantly reduce diesel emissions and promote clean transportation in the Northeast.

Groceries are delivered in reusable bags. About 150,000 reusable bags are used in the delivery process. For some time, the company would accept returns of the bags but ended that practice in 2020. Some customers have taken to repurposing the bags into clothing and art. In 2021, the company donated excess bags to local community organizations which used the bags to deliver books and food.

== Controversies ==
=== Unionization vote ===
Employees at FreshDirect have made several attempts to unionize. In 2004 and 2005, Teamster Locals ran two unsuccessful campaigns to organize FreshDirect's 500 delivery workers. Following these failed campaigns, Local 348S of the United Food and Commercial Workers ran a successful organizing drive in 2006 and subsequently negotiated a contract for FreshDirect's drivers. Although Anthony Fazio Jr., the UFCW local's secretary treasurer, said his union waged a tough fight to win recognition, some plant workers reported that company officials had openly encouraged workers to sign up with 348S.

In the summer of 2007, Local 805 of the International Brotherhood of Teamsters began signing up workers at FreshDirect's warehouse in Long Island City. UFCW Local 348S subsequently announced their intention to organize the warehouse workers. 348S later filed for an election, which was held on December 22 and 23, 2007. Approximately 530 of the warehouse's 900 employees voted in the election. Of those who participated, 426 workers voted against joining any union, 73 voted to join the Teamsters, and 31 voted to join UFCW 348S.

The election, however, was mired with controversy. Days before the election U. S. Immigration and Customs Enforcement (ICE) officials "announced plans to inspect the company’s I-9 employment eligibility records." FreshDirect asked its employees to verify their U.S. work eligibility. As a result, 200 to 300 employees were dismissed, were suspended, or quit just days before the vote was scheduled.

Union activists and some New York City elected officials claimed FreshDirect and I.C.E. intentionally created an atmosphere of fear and intimidation. FreshDirect publicly denied this, noting that some immigrant employees opposed unionization, and suggested that the union had called immigration authorities to drive off workers they had failed to win over.

=== Opposition to South Bronx move ===
FreshDirect announced plans in 2012 to move to Harlem River Yards, in the Bronx. The company planned to invest $112 million of its own capital with roughly $130 million in tax breaks and grants from the borough, city and state, claiming the project would create up to 1,000 permanent jobs, with targeted hiring for Bronx residents. It had recently expanded its delivery service to the borough and launched a pilot program that allowed some Bronx customers to pay with food stamps.

In response to the announced deal, some community members expressed concern about the use of public monies to subsidize a private enterprise and the potentially negative environmental impacts of the move on the Mott Haven area in the South Bronx. Opponents alleged that FreshDirect and city officials failed to conduct a sufficient environmental review. In addition, critics argued that FreshDirect's claim of future job creation was not backed by any legally binding agreement to create jobs. South Bronx Unite, a coalition of Bronx community organizations, businesses, and residents, attempted to stop the relocation by filing a lawsuit and launching a campaign to boycott the company.

Locally elected representatives, among them council members María del Carmen Arroyo and Melissa Mark-Viverito, New York State Senator José M. Serrano, US Congressman José E. Serrano, Comptroller John Liu and then-NYC Public Advocate Bill de Blasio, publicly came out against the proposed move. In an audit, then-comptroller Liu supported the group's claims by stating that EDC subsidized "empty job promises." Liu, who was campaigning for New York City mayor at the time, also told the press that FreshDirect was holding the city 'hostage' with the proposed move. In November 2012, Gristede's supermarket owner John Catsimatidis, the New York Association of Grocery Stores, the National Supermarket Association, and the Bodega Association announced that they were joining the opposition, claiming that FreshDirect was receiving unfair benefits from the city. Both during his primary campaign for NYC mayor, and after winning the candidacy of the Democratic party, then-NYC Public Advocate Bill de Blasio repeatedly criticized FreshDirect's proposed relocation to the South Bronx.

In June 2013, a New York Supreme Court judge threw out the lawsuit against FreshDirect's move, finding that the city's environmental review was "based on a thorough review of all areas of relevant concern." South Bronx Unite, joined by the Natural Resources Defense Council and Latino Pastoral Action Center, filed an appeal in late 2013, but their appeal was dismissed in March 2014. South Bronx Unite also organized protests against the move, including a demonstration at the Harlem River Yards on March 22, 2014, which resulted in the arrests of nine protesters. These legal challenges and protests ultimately failed to stop the move, with FreshDirect breaking ground for its new facility in December 2014.

The warehouse began operating in 2018. A study was held by researchers from Columbia University who confirmed increased traffic congestion in two neighborhoods due to the warehouse. This directly contradicts the environmental assessment submitted in 2014 which stated there would be "no significant adverse environmental impact". Traffic congestion increased significantly in both mixed-use zones in every part of the day except 9 a.m. to noon near the train yard. In Mott Haven, congestion increased significantly between midnight and 6 a.m., while on the highways, traffic increased between midnight and 6 a.m. and from 9 p.m. to midnight. Drilling down to the adjoining roads that were part of the environmental review, congestion increased for most of the day. Traffic also increased on three out of the four roads that weren't studied in the environmental assessment.

== Philanthropy and response to COVID-19 ==
In February 2020, FreshDirect announced a relationship with New York Common Pantry, a regional non-profit organization focused on reducing hunger. In the first few months of the relationship, FreshDirect customers donated more than $1 million to the organization. In September, the company announced that New York Common Pantry would also receive office space as part of the relationship.

In March, company CEO David McInerney announced a partnership with all five New York City borough presidents to launch a citywide initiative to deliver food to families impacted by the global pandemic.

In direct response to the COVID-19 outbreak, FreshDirect experienced a 50% increase in new customers. This sudden demand led the company to significantly increase the number of delivery timeslots, add capacity throughout the New York areas, and expand delivery to the Hamptons on Long Island and the New Jersey Shore. The company also re-launched FoodKick as FreshDirect Express, providing two-hour food delivery to Manhattan, Brooklyn, and parts of Queens.
