= Robert Wolf (businessman) =

American businessman (born 1962)

- Born: March 8, 1962 (age 64)
- Education: University of Pennsylvania (BS)
- Political party: Democratic

Robert Wolf (born March 8, 1962) is the former chairman and CEO of UBS Americas as well as the president and chief operating officer of UBS Investment Bank.

He is the founder of 32 Advisors, a holding company which includes the direct investing arm 32 Ventures, the bipartisan economic insights company Strategic Worldviews, and advisory services for corporate clients on financial matters, risk and governance. He was named chairman of the AI-driven messaging software platform Community in 2022.

Prior to forming 32 Advisors, Wolf spent 18 years at UBS, a global financial services firm. There he held several senior positions, including chairman and CEO of UBS Americas and president and chief operating officer of the Investment Bank. He joined UBS in 1994 after spending 10 years at Salomon Brothers. In 2016, Wolf joined Fox News/Fox Business as a contributor, where he can be seen multiple times per week on the network. More recently, he served as a member of NYC Mayor elect Eric Adams’ transition team with a focus on infrastructure, and on the board of EJF’s SPAC on the completed $8.5 billion transaction with fintech company Pagaya.

Wolf has held several Presidential appointments including one under President Biden as a member of the Pentagon’s Defense Business Board from 2022-2025 and three presidential appointments under President Obama; as a member of the Economic Recovery Advisory Board from 2009-2011, the Council on Jobs and Competitiveness from 2011-2013 and the Export Council from 2014-2016. In 2012 he was on the Homeland Security Advisory Council's Border Infrastructure Task Force. He served as an informal advisor for President Obama. In 2017, he was named to the board of directors for the Obama Foundation and chairs the foundation's audit and risk committee.

== Career ==
Wolf joined UBS AG in 1994 after ten years at Salomon Brothers working in Fixed Income. From 2002-2004, while at UBS, Wolf was global head of fixed income of the Investment Bank and previously, from 1998 to 2001, global head of credit trading, research & distribution. From 2004 to 2007, while at UBS, Wolf was chief operating officer of the Investment Bank and in 2007, he added the title of president of the Investment Bank. In 2007, he was also promoted to chairman and CEO of UBS Group Americas. He was a member of UBS's group executive board from 2008-2010. Wolf left UBS in 2012 to start 32 Advisors.

Wolf considered himself a close ally of Hillary Clinton’s 2016 Presidential Campaign calling himself “a non-surrogate surrogate” and “[…] someone that has the good fortune of being able to email Secretary Clinton, [Clinton campaign chairman] John Podesta and [senior policy adviser] Jake Sullivan directly on things I’m thinking and ideas […] I give them my best ideas, and I feel at times honored that they decide to listen to them."

In a 2016 profile in The Hill Wolf supported Hillary Clinton’s fiscally conservative plans and said conservatives should have voted for her: “My view is a lot of the business community will support the secretary because her business policies are better.” Asserting that most of the business world “lean left socially and lean right fiscally,” he said “I think when you look at leaning right fiscally, if you look at her plan versus Trump’s,” Clinton’s comes out on top. Wolf also defended Wall Street saying, “Wall Street are Americans just like everyone else. Please don’t stereotype us. We vote for a lot of different reasons, and I would actually say regulation is the least reason we vote because we know regulation is here.”

== Activities ==
Wolf serves on the board of directors of the Obama Foundation, on the Undergraduate Executive Board of the Wharton School and on the Economic Advisory Council for the Center for American Progress and on the board of the Partnership for NYC, and recently joined the Leadership Council of NYC’s Robin Hood Foundation. Wolf formerly served as Vice Chairman of the Robert F. Kennedy Center for Justice & Human Rights, on the board of trustees of the Children's Aid Society, on the Athletics Board of Overseers at the University of Pennsylvania and on the board of directors of the Financial Services Roundtable.

In 2012-2013 he hosted the show "Impact Players" on the Reuters Channel on YouTube TV. In December 2016, he joined Fox News/Fox Business as a TV contributor and was a member of the advisory board of the show “Wall Street Week”.

== Political contributions ==
During the 2004 US presidential election campaign, Wolf was a contributor to the Kerry campaign. During the 2008 United States Presidential election campaign, Wolf became a major contributor and a fundraiser for the Obama campaign:

After serving as a major contributor and fundraiser for the Obama 2008 US presidential campaign, Wolf held three Presidential appointments under President Obama; as a member of the Economic Recovery Advisory Board from 2009-2011, the Council on Jobs and Competitiveness from 2011-2013 and the Export Council from 2014-2016. In 2012 Wolf was on the Homeland Security Advisory Council's Border Infrastructure Task Force. and in June 2013, the White House appointed Wolf to the President's Export Council.

== Awards and titles ==
Wolf was honored with the Corporate Leadership Award at the 2007 Fall Gala. In 2011, he was the recipient of the Promise Award by the Children's Aid Society. He was named to Worth Magazine's 100 Most Powerful People in Finance multiple times, including most recently in 2018.

While at UPenn, he played on the varsity football team that won IVY League Championships in both the 1982 and 1983 seasons and was an honoree into the Ivy Football Association in 2013. In May 2014, Robert received the Distinguished Alumni Award from the Wharton School.

In May 2024, Wolf received an honorary Doctor of Commercial Science degree at the Suffolk University Sawyer Business School ceremony.

== Personal ==
Wolf is a graduate of the Wharton School at the University of Pennsylvania, receiving a B.S. in Economics. While at Penn, he played on the varsity football team that won IVY League Championships in both the 1982 and 1983 seasons and was an honoree into the Ivy Football Association in 2013. In May 2014, Robert received the Distinguished Alumni Award from the Wharton School.

He was born and raised in Marblehead, MA and is in the town's Athletics Hall of Fame. He currently resides in Purchase, NY with his wife, Carol, who is a Senior Director of Corporate Development at Sandy Hook Promise.
