= American Seniors Housing Association =

The American Seniors Housing Association (ASHA), created in 1991, is a business association for senior housing providers. It claims to be the "premier source for research, conferences and advocacy." ASHA's membership consists of around 400 companies that operate, develop, and finance various aspects of seniors housing. ASHA's membership owns and/or manages more than 600,000 units of senior apartments, independent living, assisted living, and continuing care retirement communities.

The ASHA sponsors a political action committee named the Seniors Housing PAC.

David S. Schless has been the president of the organization since its founding in 1991.
