= Silver Living =

Coordinates: 40.748257°N 73.984509°W

Silver Living, Inc.
- Industry: Consumer advocacy
- Founded: New York City, New York, USA
- Headquarters: New York City, New York, USA
- Area served: United States
- Services: Assisted living reviews, Senior living reviews

Silver Living is a privately held, expert reviewer of senior living communities based in New York City, New York. The company provides in-depth research on senior housing and elder care providers to seniors and their families. The company reviews assisted living communities, independent living communities, retirement communities, independent senior apartments, and continuing care retirement communities.

The company's experts gather extensive information on each community including:

- State inspection and complaint reports
- The company's own mystery shoppers
- Interviews with current residents at each community
- Transparent pricing for each room type, care level, medication level, and miscellaneous fees (move-in fees, cable fees, pet fees)

The company's photographers photograph each community "to offer a realistic portrayal of what accommodations and facilities looks like."

Silver Living has been credited with transforming the sales experience for senior living communities by increasing all-around transparency, as well as publishing detailed pricing for each senior living community.

== Related links ==
- Silver Living website
