= Centerbridge Partners =

Multi-strategy private investment firm

Centerbridge Partners, L.P.
- Type: Private
- Industry: Hedge fund, Private Equity
- Founded: 2005; 21 years ago
- Headquarters: Seagram Building; New York City, New York, United States
- Products: Leveraged buyouts, distressed securities
- AUM: $56 Billion
- Website: centerbridge.com

Centerbridge Partners, L.P. is a multi-strategy private investment firm focused on leveraged buyouts and distressed securities.

The firm manages over $56 billion of assets and is based in New York City, with an additional office in London. The firm invests in both control (private equity and public debt with a "loan-to-own" strategy) and non-control (public market debt, public market equities, and other publicly traded securities) opportunities.

The firm was founded in 2005 by Jeffrey Aronson and Mark Gallogly. Aronson had previously been the head of distressed securities and had founded the leveraged loan business at Angelo, Gordon & Co., which he had joined in 1989 from L.F. Rothschild & Co. Gallogly was formerly a senior managing director and head of private equity investments at the Blackstone Group from 2003 until his departure. At Blackstone, Gallogly was heavily involved in the firm's investments in New Skies Satellites and Sirius Satellite Radio among others and had joined the firm in 1989 from Manufacturers Hanover Trust Company, where he worked in acquisition finance.

In September 2006, the firm raised its debut fund with $3.2 billion of investor commitments to focus on control investments in distressed securities as well as leveraged buyout transactions. The firm also raised a $2 billion non-control, activist-oriented credit trading fund known as Centerbridge Special Credit Partners through 2009 and 2010. In 2010, the firm announced plans to begin marketing a second investment fund with a target of $3.75 billion of investor commitments. In 2011, the firm closed its second flagship fund, Centerbridge Partners II, on $4.4 billion, including a commitment from the GP. This was followed by a closing of its $2bn second Special Credit Partners fund in March 2012.

In 2010, Centerbridge won control of Extended Stay Hotels, a company that Gallogly had been involved with at Blackstone. That same year, Centerbridge acquired 'GMAC Commercial Finance', a subsidiary of Ally Financial as well as Rock Bottom Restaurants and Gordon Biersch Brewery Restaurant Group, merged to form CraftWorks Restaurants & Breweries. In 2012, Centerbridge acquired P. F. Chang's China Bistro, a chain of Chinese casual dining restaurants. Three years later announced its agreement to buy Senvion SE from Indian wind turbine manufacturer Suzlon and acquired Great Wolf Resorts, the world's largest chain of indoor water park resorts for $1.35 billion.

In August 2016, Centerbridge Partners, together with Canyon Capital Advisors, Värde Partners and seven other funds, participates in the rescue of Spanish giant Abengoa, injecting a combined €1.17 billion.

In January 2017, Centerbridge Partners sells Vela Energy to Sonnedix for €600 million. Sonnedix thus takes over a portfolio of 136MWp, corresponding to 43 solar PV plants in Spain, making it the second largest solar PV operator in Spain and one of the largest in the world, with close to 500MW worldwide.

During the 2020 Democratic Party presidential primaries, Pete Buttigieg received scrutiny for accepting donations from members of Centerbridge due to the firm's "reputation for its work buying up distressed debt in Puerto Rico." Centerbridge sat on the steering committee of the Ad Hoc group, a group of hedge funds that litigated against the Puerto Rican government for full repayment on constitutionally guaranteed general obligation bonds.

In the fall of 2020, Centerbridge took a minority stake in FreshDirect, an online grocer. The deal was part of a buyout of the company along with Dutch-based food retailer Ahold Delhaize.

As of March 2026, Centerbridge was believed to have held talks with investment company J.C. Flowers & Co. regarding a possible partnership to take over Irish retail bank Permanent TSB (PTSB).
