= Jeff Aronson =

American businessman (born 1958)

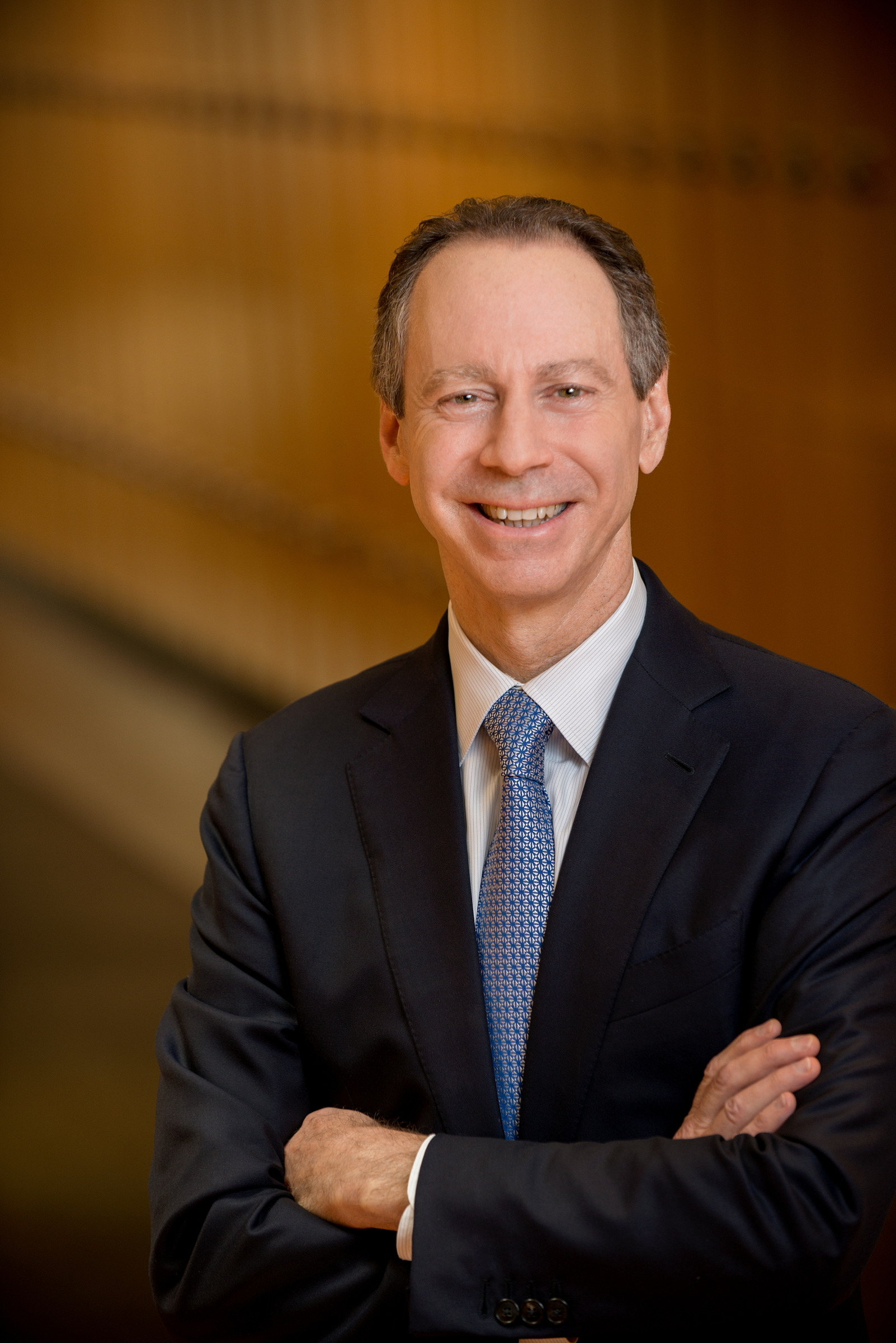
- Born: September 21, 1958 (age 67)
- Education: Johns Hopkins University; New York University School of Law
- Occupations: Co-Founder, Managing Principal, at Centerbridge Partners L.P.

Jeffrey Aronson (born September 21, 1958) is an American businessman and philanthropist. He co-founded the private investment firm Centerbridge Partners in 2005 with Mark T. Gallogly.

== Education ==
Aronson attended Johns Hopkins University and graduated with honors in 1980. As a student at Johns Hopkins University, he was involved in student government and fraternity affairs. Aronson received his J.D. from New York University School of Law in 1983.

== Career ==
Aronson began his career as a securities attorney with the law firm of Stroock & Stroock & Lavan. Later, he served as a Senior Corporate Counsel at L.F. Rothschild.

Aronson is a former partner at Angelo, Gordon & Co. and served as head of its distressed investments and leveraged loans business. Joining the firm in 1989, he was the portfolio manager for the distressed securities funds from 1992 until 2005. Aronson also founded Angelo, Gordon’s leveraged loan business in 1998 and served as a portfolio manager for the firm’s leveraged loan funds.

In 2005, Aronson and Mark Gallogly, founded Centerbridge Partners L.P. As of 2017, the investment firm had offices in New York City and London and managed approximately $30 billion in capital, focusing on private equity, distressed securities, and credit investments. As Managing Principal, Aronson has overseen and been responsible for the firm’s investing activities. He has sat on numerous creditor committees and has participated in U.S. and overseas restructurings.

== Philanthropy ==
In 2006, Aronson joined the Johns Hopkins University board of trustees and was elected chair of the board in 2013. Aronson also chairs the executive committee of the university’s board of trustees. He also serves on the board of trustees of Johns Hopkins Medicine and New York University School of Law.

Aronson and his wife, Shari Aronson, run the Jeffrey H. and Shari L. Aronson Family Foundation, focusing on education and Jewish causes. In 2015, the Foundation committed $10 million to create an international studies center at Johns Hopkins University called the Aronson Center for International Studies.

The Aronson Family Foundation has supported early education efforts through Teach for America, Breakthrough Collaborative, Harlem RBI, the Fund for Public Schools, Harlem Village Academies, and Bottom Line. The foundation has also supported numerous education institutions, including New York University, Lehigh University, the University of Pittsburgh, Bankstreet College of Education, and Williams College.

The Aronsons have funded Jewish organizations, including the Jewish Museum, the Birthright Israel Foundation, UJA Federation, and the Jewish Community Center of Mid-Westchester. In addition to education and Jewish causes, the Aronsons focus their philanthropy in health and environmental areas.

== Personal life ==
Aronson lives in New York City with his wife Shari. Together they have two daughters and a son.
