= Vi Senior Living =

Continuing care retirement communities in the U.S.

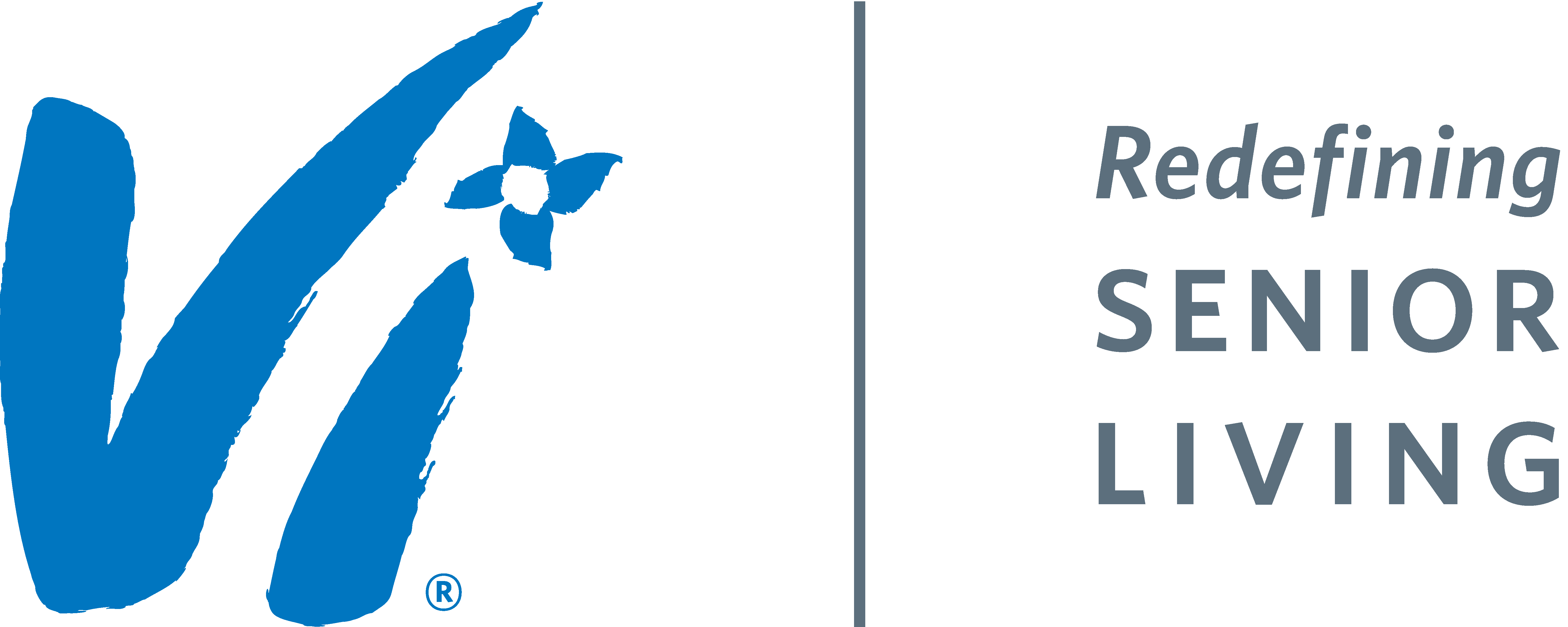
- Type: Private Corporation
- Industry: Senior Living
- Founded: 1987
- Founder: Penny Pritzker
- Headquarters: 233 South Wacker Drive, Suite 8400 Chicago, Illinois, 60606
- Number of locations: 10
- Key people: Gary Smith (President and CEO)
- Number of employees: 3,000 (May 2026)
- Website: viliving.com

Vi Senior Living (Vi) is a high-end retirement community developer, owner, and management group based out of Chicago, Illinois, United States. Vi maintains 10 continuing care retirement communities (CCRCs) in six states, including Arizona, California, Colorado, Florida, Illinois, and South Carolina. Founded in 1987 by Penny Pritzker, the privately held company houses over 5,000 residents and employs more than 3,000 workers as of May 2026.

Vi is owned by LCS as of May 2026. Based in Des Moines, Iowa, and established in 1971, LCS is a leading owner and operator of Life Plan (CCRC) and rental senior living communities. With the addition of Vi, LCS owns and/or manages more than 130 senior living communities across more than 29 states.

== History ==
Vi, formerly known as Classic Residence by Hyatt, was founded in 1987 by Penny Pritzker. The Pritzker family background in founding the Hyatt hotel chain and Marmon Group inspired Penny Pritzker's vision to bring high-end hospitality to senior living communities across the United States. The Chicago-based company acquired a few high-end independent living rental communities that contained assisted living units. In total, Classic Residence by Hyatt, since rebranded as Vi, developed six original communities and acquired another four communities, each of which required additional development. Before Classic Residence by Hyatt rebranded to Vi, the first Classic Residence rental communities were located in Monterey, California; Chevy Chase, Maryland; Teaneck, New Jersey; Dallas, Texas; Reno, Nevada; and Chicago, Illinois from 1989 to 1990.

== Growth and Development ==
As Classic Residence made efforts to expand under Vi, its first acquisition of Bentley Village, a continuing care retirement community in Naples, Florida, was completed in 1992. This location has since been renamed Vi at Bentley Village. In 1996, Vi purchased its first residential tower of La Jolla Village in San Diego, California. The same year, Vi at Lakeside Village in Lantana, Florida was acquired. The Lakeside Village community includes two restaurants and cafes, bar and ice cream shop, a beauty salon, fitness center, swimming pool, and hosts regular bus trips for residents. A big part of Classic Residence by Hyatt and Vi's lifestyle is the variety of amenities offered to residents, which resemble continuing education in the form of field trips, group discussions, and classes.

In the coming years, Vi continued the trend of developing and acquiring retirement communities. The company acquired TidePointe in Hilton Head Island, South Carolina out of bankruptcy in 1998. Vi at Grayhawk, one of two Vi communities in Scottsdale, Arizona, opened in 1999. In 2002, Vi at The Glen in Glenview, a suburb of Chicago's North Shore opened its 1,000-acre master-planned community. Between 2003 and 2010, the following communities opened: Vi at Aventura in Aventura, Florida (2003), Vi at Palo Alto in Silicon Valley, California (2005), Vi at Highlands Ranch in Highlands Ranch, Colorado (2008), and Vi at Silverstone in Scottsdale, Arizona (2010). Classic Residence officially rebranded as Vi in June 2010 (pronounced “vee”, derived from “vita”, the Latin word for “life”). The continuing care retirement communities were rebranded as Vi, while rental properties were renamed to “Classic Residence, a Vi Community.”

In January 2012, Pritzker announced her resignation as Vi Senior Living chairwoman. As a result, Kevin Poorman, vice chairman of the company, was appointed to fill her role.

In September 2025, Des Moines-based LCS announced that it would be adding Vi's 10 communities to its portfolio as part of a strategic merger agreement. The deal closed on May 1, 2026.

== Communities ==
Continuing Care Retirement Communities
- Vi at Bentley Village, Naples, Florida (1992)
- Vi at Lakeside Village, Lantana, Florida (1996)
- TidePointe, Hilton Head Island, South Carolina (1998)
- Vi at La Jolla Village, La Jolla, California (1998)
- Vi at Grayhawk, Scottsdale, Arizona (1999)
- Vi at The Glen, Glenview, Illinois (2002)
- Vi at Aventura, Aventura, Florida (2003)
- Vi at Palo Alto, Palo Alto, California (2005)
- Vi at Highlands Ranch, Highlands Ranch, Colorado (2008)
- Vi at Silverstone, Scottsdale, Arizona (2010)

== Leadership ==
- Chief Executive Officer: Gary Smith (2022–), Randy Richardson (2000–2022)

As of 2022, other executive leadership includes:

- Cary Maslow, EVP and Chief Operating Officer
- Tom Muszynski, EVP and Chief Financial Officer
- Tara Cope, EVP and Chief Legal Officer

== Ongoing Training ==
Through its Management Development Program, Vi employees can access more than 1,000 online courses. More than 600 employees have graduated from this program since its start in 2008.

== Litigation ==
Residents of Vi's La Jolla community filed a class action lawsuit against Vi in 2006. Accusations included fraud and deceit, elder abuse, breach of fiduciary duty, unfair business practices, and violation of part of the California health and safety code. Vi denied any wrongdoing, but reached a settlement with affected residents in 2008 that included:

- A lump sum payment to residents,
- A 3% annual ceiling on monthly fee increases through 2013 for residents who took part in the lawsuit, and a 4% ceiling for every subsequent year, and
- Certain changes to the Wellness Center operations.

In 2014, six residents at Vi's Palo Alto community filed a class action lawsuit against Vi, alleging refundable entrance fees were improperly being transferred out of state to its parent company without establishing a reserve fund as required by state law. In February 2019, the case was dismissed by a US District Court judge, who ruled that the plaintiffs (Vi residents) "lack standing in their civil claim" because they did not show that harm was done or was imminent. The residents appealed; and the California Continuing Care Residents Association together with the California Advocates for Nursing Home Reform filed a joint amicus brief in support of their appeal. The Appeals Court, in April 2020, found that “the statutory violation of failing to maintain a refund reserve harms Residents by putting them in the distressing position of choosing between vacating the Vi and potentially risking non-repayment, or continuing to live at the Vi in a state of perceived financial insecurity.” Subsequently, a proposed class action settlement was reached at the U.S. District Court for the Northern District of California, which will hold its final hearing in September 2022.

== Awards and recognition ==
- 2011: Vi was ranked 85th out of Training Magazine's Training Top 125 list.
- 2017: Chicago Tribune added Vi to its list of Top Workplaces.
- 2018: Vi was named one of the Top Companies to Work For by Arizona Central.
- 2018: All 10 Vi communities earned the Great Place to Work certification.
- 2018: Ranked #10 in Fortune's Best Workplaces for the Aging Services.
- 2019: CEO and President Randy Richardson ranked #19 in Glassdoor's Top CEOs Employees’ Choice.
- 2019: Ranked #5 in Fortune's Workplaces for Aging Services
- 2019: Vi was ranked 4th out of 57 global organizations for its corporate education program in Chief Learning Officer's LearningElite Awards.
- 2019: All 10 Vi communities earned the Great Place to Work certification.
- 2019: Recognized for "Best in Wellness" Culture in ICAA NuStep Beacon Awards.
- 2019: Mentioned in Glassdoor's Best Places to Work for the coming year 2020.
- 2020: Ranked #26 in Glassdoor's Best Places to Work.
- 2020: Ranked #42 in Training Magazine's Top 125 Organizations.
- 2020: Judy Whitcomb, SVP of HR, recognized as Crain's Chicago Business Notable Leader
- 2021: All 10 Vi communities earned the Great Place to Work certification.
- 2021: Ranked #9 in Fortune's Best Workplaces in Aging Services
- 2022: All 10 Vi communities earned the Great Place to Work certification.
- 2023: All 10 Vi communities earned the Great Place to Work certification.
