= Joe Fedele =

American businessman (born 1962)

Joseph Fedele (known as Joe Fedele, born C. 1962) is an entrepreneur who co-founded New York-based online specialty grocery FreshDirect in 1998 along with investment banker Jason Ackerman. Fedele was CEO and co-chairman from 1998 to 2004.

Prior to FreshDirect, Fedele was CEO and president of Fairway Market on West 132nd Street in Manhattan from 1993 to 1998. During that period, the company disintermediated its supply chain for perishable and specialty products and introduced just-in-time inventory stocking.

== Early life ==
Fedele was born in Brooklyn, New York and graduated from Hofstra University, acquiring a BBA in Accounting, Finance, Economics and Mathematics in 1980.

== Career ==
=== PFI ===
In 1982, he founded PFI, one of the largest protein and perishable trading companies in the US with customers such as Marubeni, Komatsu Gosho, Sumitomo, Price Club, Walmart, and others.

=== By Choice ===
By Choice was a Harlem fresh market opened by Fedele and his partners in February 1991 it was converted to Fairway "Like No Other Market."

The New York Times wrote that "Fedele got his perfect partners when the owners of the Fairway Market at Broadway and 74th Street signed on as partners."

=== Fairway market(s) ===
Fairway Market was founded in 1933. Fedele's involvement came when the founder's grandson Howard Glickberg's flagship store (Broadway/West 74th Street) helped restart the failed By Choice.

In 1991 Fedele had helped found the "Business Process" that later converted Fairway from its small format original single store on 74th and Broadway to the new Fairway ("Like No Other Market"). This independent store in Harlem was attracting more than 20,000 customers a week within two months of opening. A combination of variety, quality, and low prices in a marketplace atmosphere, attracted shoppers from all over the New York City area, from the Upper Manhattan to the then-inner-city neighborhood where it was located. Fairway achieved high quality products at low prices by cutting out all middle distributors. The store bought from "the guy who takes it from the land, takes it from the sea, puts it in a can or slaughters it. This way, it's four to five days fresher and 30% cheaper," said Fedele. Fedele, who calls himself a food technologist, believes that direct buying ensures quality. Perishables that go through layers of distribution experience temperature fluctuations and inevitably suffer from adulteration. Quality is also reinforced through selectivity. "Our expertise is to pick the best quality grades in meat, fish and produce," he said.

=== FreshDirect ===
In 1998, Fedele launched FreshDirect. He initially raised $120 million and leveraged a no-store concept to develop a better plan: start by dealing directly with farmers, fishermen, and slaughterhouses and build a single super-efficient manufacturing and distribution facility to hold down costs. That kept gross margins high enough to cover the added costs of reliable delivery, offered in densely packed neighborhoods. Kenneth Boyer, an associate professor at Michigan State University's business school who studies online grocers, says a visit to the company "really blew me away."

== Controversies ==
=== Harlem Fairway Certificate of Occupancy ===
At the reopened/retitled Fairway facility in Harlem, as of early 1996 they lacked a Certificate of Occupancy. Co-owner Dave Sneldon claimed to have "a temporary certificate of occupancy to operate a wholesale business." Fedele said "we don't charge retail prices." A NYC commissioner claimed that they didn't apply.

=== Fairway/FreshDirect: Fedele's role(s) ===
After selling his interest in Fairway (to Glickberg and his partners) to start FreshDirect in 1998, Fedele became embroiled in a series of disputes with Fairway's owners, who accused him of over-representing his role in the creation of Fairway's Harlem branch. In response, Fedele says that his description of himself as the branch's "co-founder" is an understatement. He was quoted saying, in response to Glickberg, "my former partners at Fairway did business in the traditional retail way for 30 years before we became partners, having multiple distributors between them and the products that they sold. I guess after I became their partner they had this epiphany of totally disintermediating of supply chain which resulted in the "highest value proposition possible to the consumer. Getting them better, fresher food at 30 percent savings and giving us a sustainable, competitive and differentiated advantage."

Fairway began hanging signs in its aisles attacking Fedele's credibility and the quality of FreshDirect's produce. New York Magazine wrote (May 17, 2004):

The FreshDirect posters blaring that the company was BROUGHT TO YOU BY A CO-FOUNDER OF FAIRWAY UPTOWN and featuring a photo of Fedele made [Fairway owner Howie] Glickberg furious. He posted signs inside the West 74th Street store reading FAIRWAY IS IN NO WAY AFFILIATED WITH FRESHDIRECT. FreshDirect jabbed back by sending staffers dressed as giant fruits and vegetables to pass out fliers in front of Fairway. Then the FreshDirect website added a lengthy description of Fedele's role in the uptown Fairway, headlined: HEY FAIRWAY, WHAT ARE YOU AFRAID OF? Fairway threatened to sue.

Fairway never sued, but the accusatory-claims and counter-claims continued.

== Awards ==
- Fedele and FreshDirect co-founder Ackerman won the Ernst & Young Entrepreneur of the Year award for 2003 for the Metropolitan New York Area, and Fedele was nominated for the national Ernst & Young Entrepreneur of the Year award in 2003, eventually won by John Mackey.
- Fedele and his partners at Fairway Market won the Ernst & Young Entrepreneur of the Year Award in New York City in 1996.

== See also ==
- FreshDirect
- Fairway Market
