= Continuing care retirement communities in the United States =

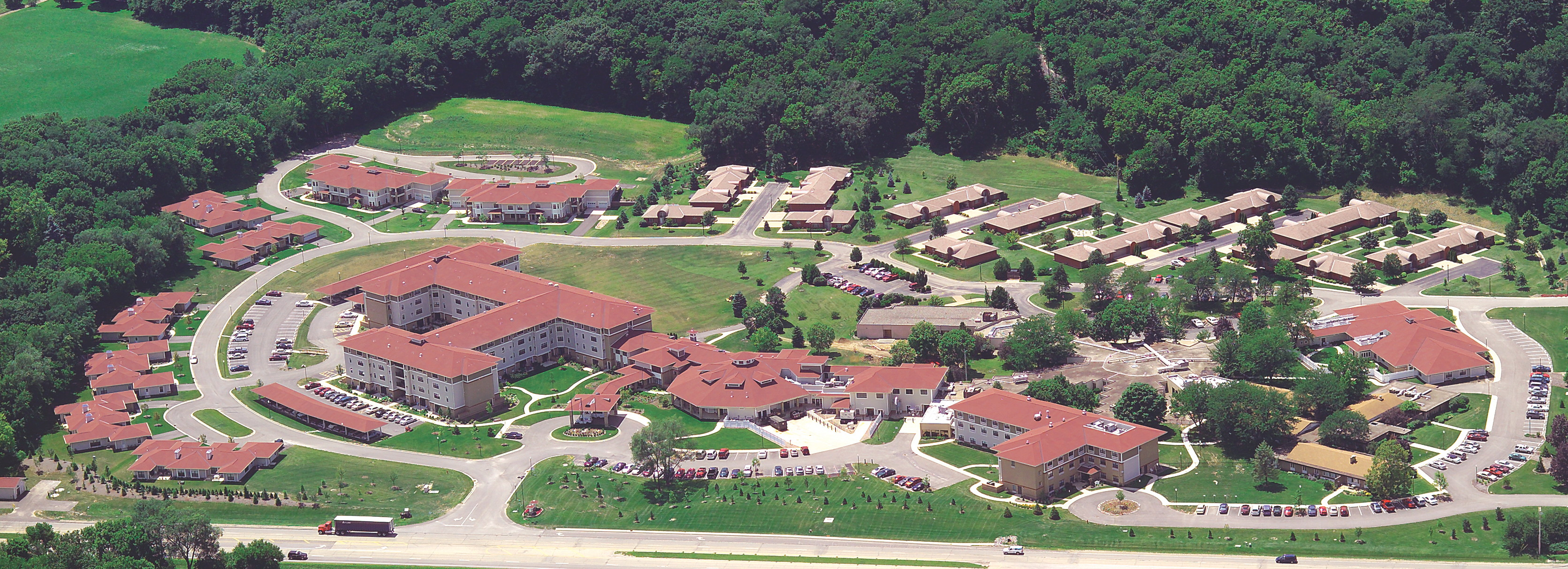
Lutheran Hillside Village (first building opened 1963) in Peoria, IL

A continuing care retirement community (CCRC), sometimes known as a life plan community, is a type of retirement community in the U.S. where a continuum of aging care needs—from independent living, assisted living, and skilled nursing care—can all be met within the community. These various levels of shelter and care may be housed on different floors or wings of a single high-rise building or in physically adjacent buildings, such as garden apartments, cottages, duplexes, mid- and low-rise buildings, or spread out in a campus setting. The emphasis of the CCRC model is to enable residents to avoid having to move, except to another level of care within the community, if their needs change.

== Description ==
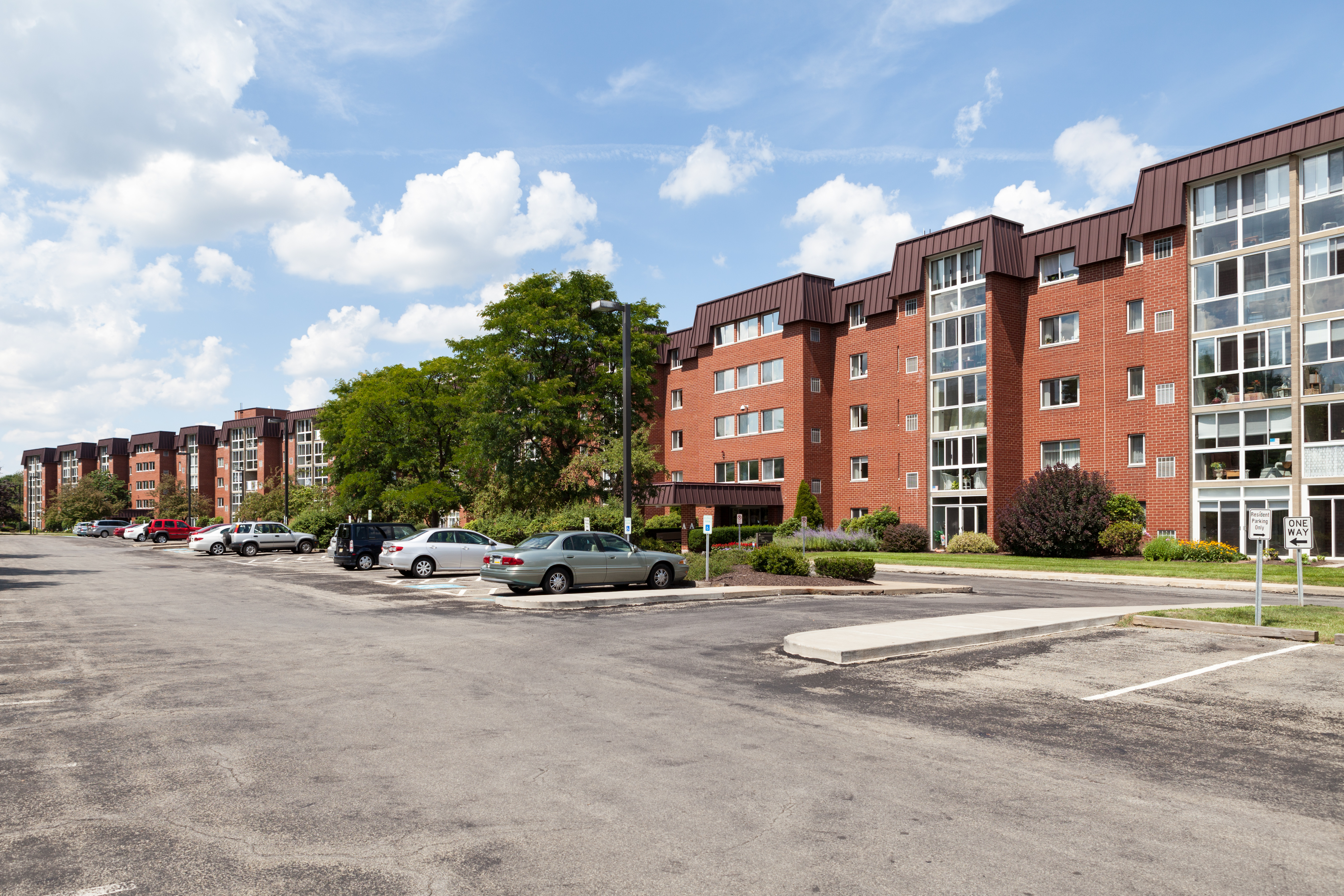
The Village at St. Barnabas (opened 1980) in Gibsonia, PA

Typically, all of the living options (independent living, assisted living, and skilled nursing) of a Continuing Care Retirement Community (CCRC) are on a single campus. The typical CCRC in the United States varies greatly in size, although the average is just over 330 units, made up of 231 independent or congregate living units, 34 assisted living beds, and 70 skilled nursing home beds. On average, an older resident in the United States might live in the independent living facility for 10–12 years, the assisted living facility for 1-2 year, and the skilled nursing facility for 1–2 years.

In 2010, there were approximately 1,900 CCRCs in the United States, located in 48 states and the District of Columbia; Alaska and Wyoming had none. The top ten states with the greatest number of CCRCs are Pennsylvania, Ohio, California, Illinois, Florida, Texas, Kansas, Indiana, Iowa, and North Carolina—in that order.

Typically, seniors move into a CCRC while still living independently, with few health risks or healthcare needs, and will remain there until end of life. Most CCRCs require both health and financial assurances for admission. As seniors progress in age, and medical needs change, the level of nursing care and service increases proportionally in response. In such a way, the needs of seniors are consistently monitored and catered to, particularly as those needs become more intensive. If greater illness or injury warrants hospitalization (not available in CCRCs), the senior may return to his or her CCRC residence after recovery, and should receive appropriate rehabilitative care.

Continuing-care retirement communities are attractive for seniors who find themselves living in increasing social isolation as they age, who would like to be immersed in a hospitable environment with other people of similar age and would like to plan for their long-term health care needs. Typically, a range of activities and amenities are provided for both recreation and resource. However, CCRCs are costly, and vary widely in entrance and recurring fees.

== Types of assistance and care ==
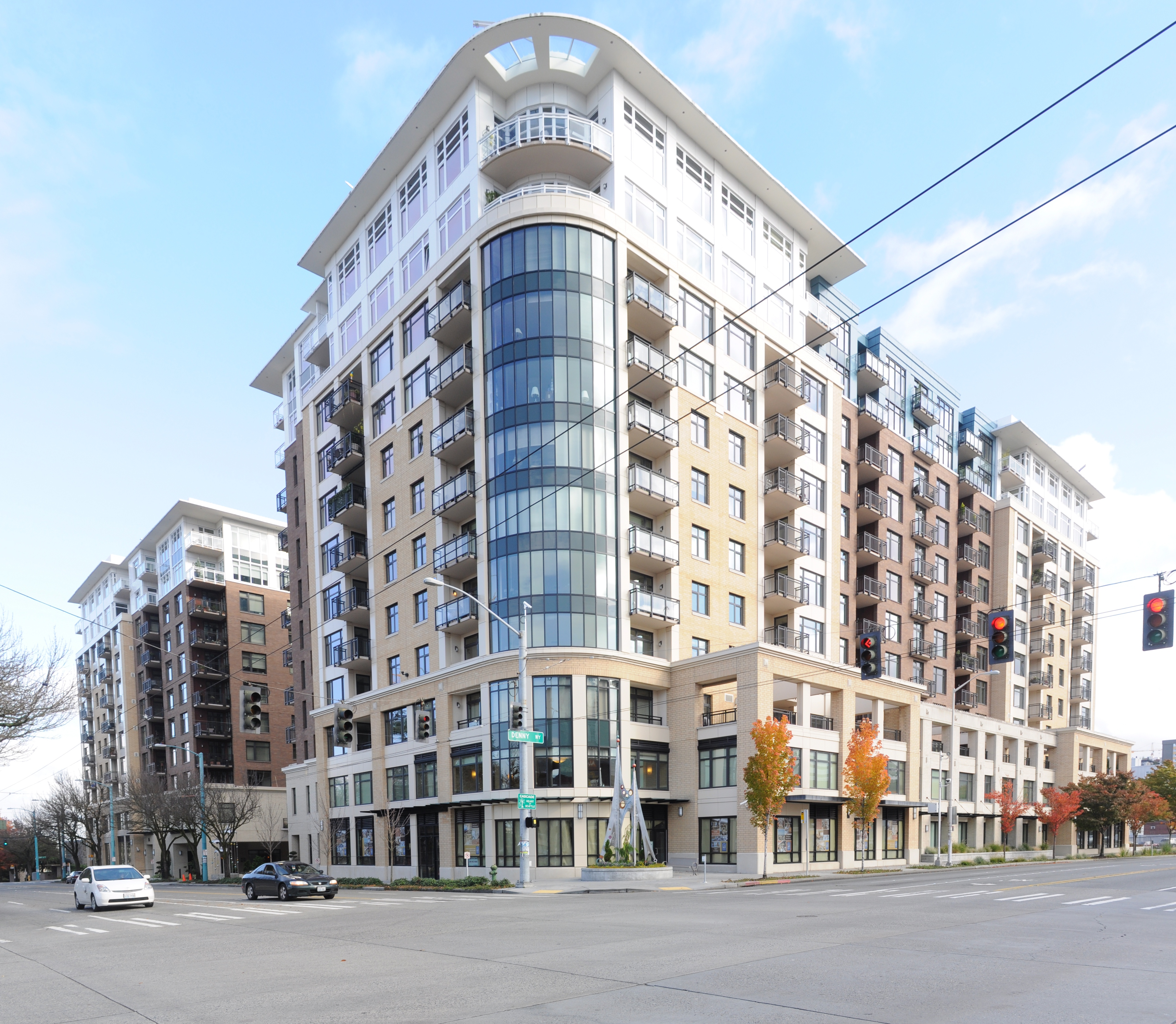
Mirabella (CCRC opened Dec 2008) in Seattle, WA

In most CCRCs there are three levels of care:

- independent living, in which residents care for themselves and enjoy housekeeping services and a wide array of other services and amenities in the community. Some CCRCs have special programs, e.g., in partnership with Masterpiece Living, to help residents with successful aging.
- assisted living, in which residents are given help as needed with daily tasks such as bathing and dressing in the residential unit or in a dedicated facility in the community.
- 24-hour nursing home care, usually in a dedicated skilled nursing facility.

In addition, many CCRCs have a fourth level of memory support care, in addition to assisted living and skilled nursing; some offer home- and community-based care, expanding their reach into the greater community; and a few provide the last level of end-of-life care.

== Types of contracts ==
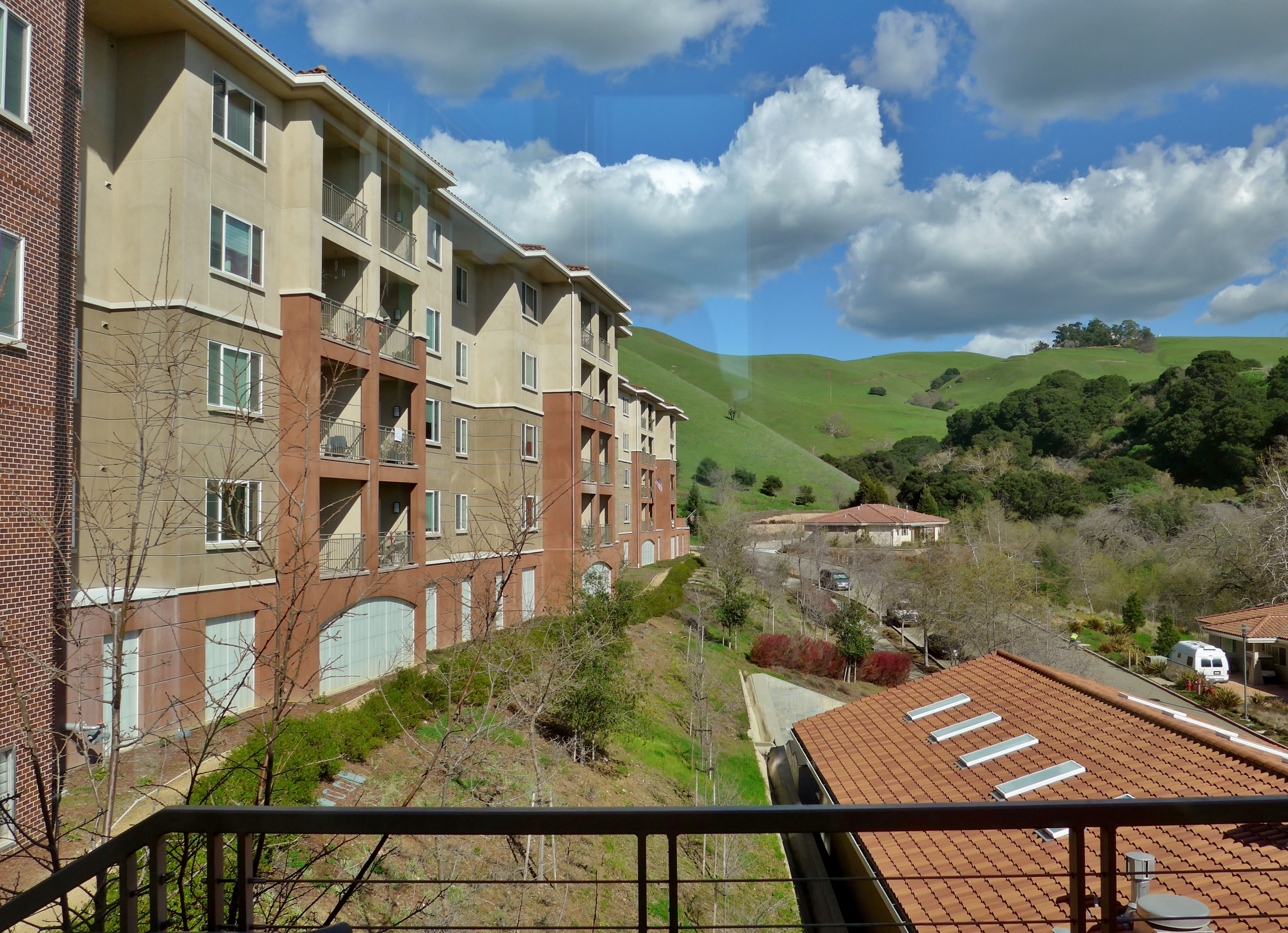
Acacia Creek (CCRC opened in 2010), Union City, CA

Often, a life-care contract is required, and the stipulations within such contracts can also vary in terms of service. Contracts typically specify the shelter arrangements, residential services, personal and health care, and nursing care that they are guaranteed during their stay in the CCRC. These agreements also specify the present costs to the residents of living in its community and using its resources, the conditions under which costs may be increased, and the conditions under which residents must transfer among its levels of care. These contracts are designed to protect the rights of the older residents, but they also give the owners of CCRCs considerable influence as to what long-term care benefits older residents receive.

The American Seniors Housing Association (ASHA) distinguishes three principal contract types: Type A or life care (also known as extensive or all-inclusive); Type B or modified; and Type C or fee-for-service (ASHA, 2002). These contracts reflect the differences in the way CCRCs charge for personal assistance and nursing care and the extent to which they guarantee the availability of this care without additional costs to residents. In practice, CCRCs will often offer residents contract arrangements that represent a blend of these three contract types.

- Type A or Life Care contracts – CCRCs offering Type A or life care contracts guarantee their residents shelter, residential services, and amenities along with personal assistance and nursing care for the rest of their lives in return for an initial entrance fee and a monthly payment schedule. CCRCs usually offer these contracts to seniors who initially occupy their congregate or independent living units. The entry fees may be nonrefundable or partially refundable depending on the length of the resident's stay. Under the life care contract, residents who move to the assisted living or nursing home accommodations of the CCRC continue to pay a monthly fee similar to what they had for their independent living accommodations. CCRCs agree to increase these fees only to compensate for normal operating costs increases. In this way, CCRCs absorb the risk of any increases in the cost of providing health and long-term care to residents with Type A contracts. CCRCs that offer Type A contracts can sometimes be called Life Care communities in contrast to the common Life Plan moniker.
- Type B or Modified contracts – often have lower monthly fees than Type A contracts, while including the same housing and residential amenities as Type A contracts. However, only some health care services are included in the initial monthly fee. Under the modified contract, when residents move to a higher level of care, the CCRC agrees to charge the independent living rate for only some specified time period, after which residents must pay either a full or a discounted per diem rate. For example, a resident may receive 30, 60, or 90 days of assisted living or nursing care without an increased charge. Thereafter, residents would pay the market daily rate or a discounted daily rate, as determined by the CCRC, for all assisted living or nursing care required and face the risk of having to pay higher costs for needed care.
- Type C or Fee-for-Service contracts – often require an entrance fee lower than Type A or B or none at all. Under the Fee-for-Service contract, residents receive priority or guaranteed admission to the CCRC's higher levels of care, but they are not entitled to any discounted health care or assisted living services. Rather, on entering a CCRC's assisted living facility or nursing home, they pay the regular and usually higher price per diem market rate. Older residents admitted directly into a CCRC's assisted living facility or nursing home would typically sign fee-for-service contracts. Under the Type C contract, the risk of high long-term care expenses rests with the resident.

Some CCRCs offer a fourth type of contract, Type D or rental agreements, which generally require no entrance fee, but a monthly fee for basic independent living amenities, with guaranteed access to CCRC services and health care. Type D contracts are essentially pay-as-you-go, and residents take on the risk of all expenses and their increases in exchange for little or no entrance fee.

Few CCRCs offer an equity model, in which the resident owns the residential unit that may be resold later.

Most CCRCs offer more than one type of contract with some options introduced in response to recent economic conditions. Consumer selection of contract types appears to favor the type of contract the CCRC has offered the longest, rather than any particular analysis. Even though a CCRC's entrance fees (in Type A, B, and sometimes C contracts) represent in part lump-sum long-term care insurance premiums (or prepayments of future costs) paid by all non-rental residents upon entry for health care that is used at any given time by only a small subgroup, the "sweet spot" for the entrance fees appears to be determined not actuarially but by whether it resembles locally affordable housing, viz., whether the entry fee is at or below the local market home values. Entrance fees are sometimes marketed as fees to "reserve your home". Most residents raise the money for entrance fees by selling their homes. Ziegler reports as of its March 2017 poll that Type A and C contracts are increasing in popularity and that entrance fees have and will increase.

A simple and rough way to compare contracts is to calculate the total expected combined entrance and monthly fees over a typical resident's expected lifetime in the community, i.e., the simple actuarial model.

== Regulations and risks ==
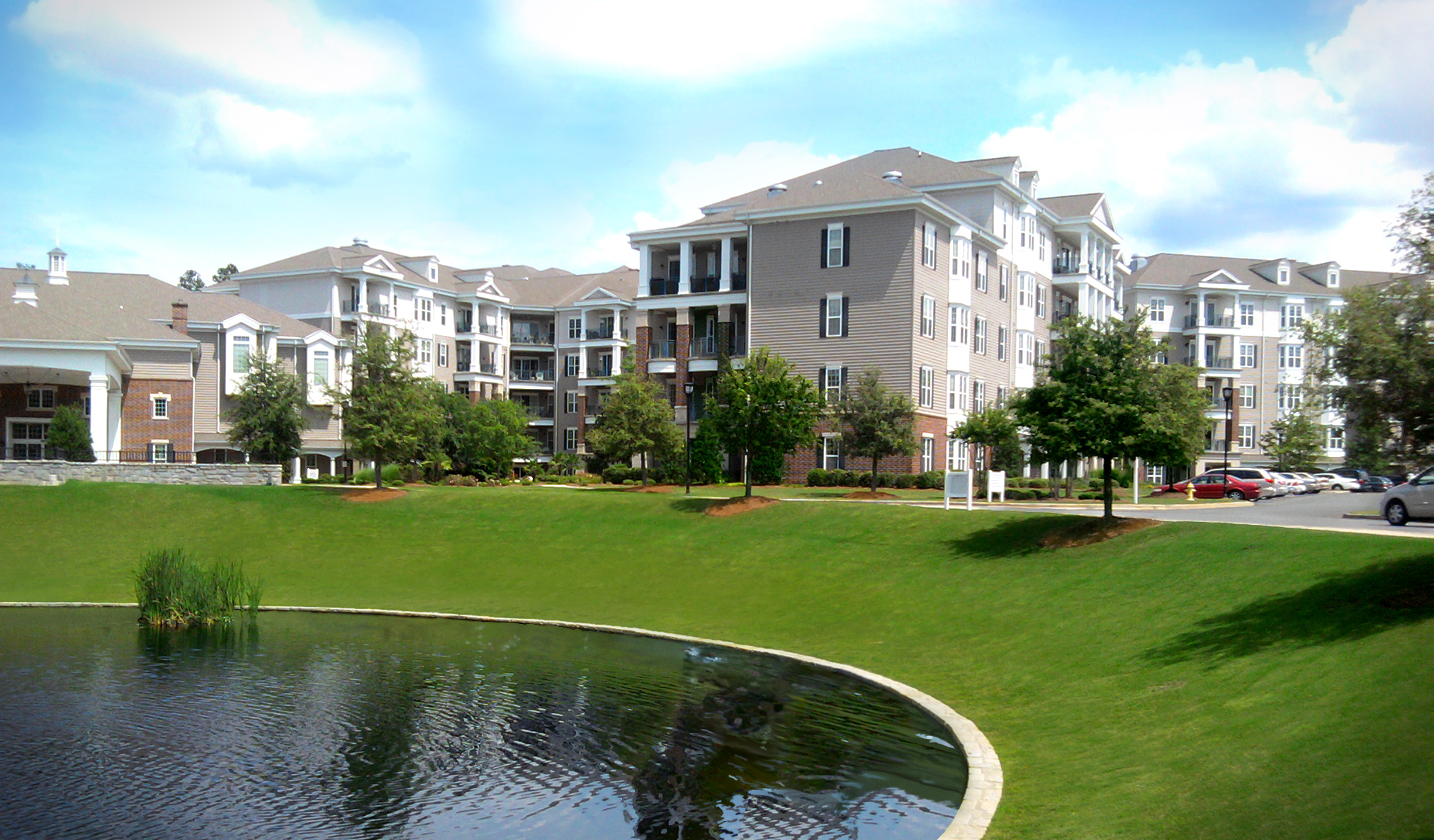
Spring Harbor at Green Island CCRC, Columbus, Georgia

In 2010, the US Government Accountability Office (GAO) reported to the US Senate's Special Committee on Aging that CCRCs can provide benefits to older Americans, but not without some risk. Specific risks vary by CCRC and by state. CCRCs are primarily regulated by states rather than by the federal government. States generally license CCRC providers, monitor and oversee their financial condition, and have regulatory provisions designed to inform and protect consumers. California, Florida, Illinois, New York, Pennsylvania, Texas, and Wisconsin all had the regulatory authority to financially examine CCRCs to assess financial condition or viability. The U.S. Department of Health and Human Services provides oversight of nursing facilities that are commonly part of CCRCs, but this oversight focuses on the quality of care and safety of residents in those facilities that receive payments under the Medicare and Medicaid programs. If the community participates in Medicare and/or Medicaid (as opposed to private pay only), then the skilled nursing unit will be rated by the U.S. government on the basis of health inspections, staffing, and resident assessments.

Potential residents, or their current caregivers, should inquire about licensing reports, prior inspections and verified complaints to help inform their opinion of a particular CCRC. It is also advisable for potential residents and their caregivers to have open discussions with current residents and receive their opinions on the CCRC in question. Given the complexity of CCRCs, a check list or worksheet is very useful.

A list of accredited CCRCs (about 300 out of 1,900) can be procured from the Commission on Accreditation of Rehabilitation Facilities, which also provides resources to help evaluate CCRC options.

It is important when considering CCRC contracts to have an elder law attorney review its terms and ensure legitimacy.

In its 2010 report, GAO identified some risks CCRC residents might face, including: losing their residence and familiar surroundings in the event of a CCRC closure; losing the refundable portion of their entrance fees — which may amount to hundreds of thousand of dollars or more — if a CCRC encountered financial difficulties; facing larger-than-expected increases in monthly and other fees that could erode their existing assets or make the CCRC unaffordable to them. The biggest risk to CCRC residents is that the CCRC might default and not deliver its promised and paid-for care.

CCRC residents should know that management's ability to fill a vacant unit directly affects the level of fees that they must pay and the CCRC's ability to operate on a sound sustainable financial basis. In evaluating financial stability, one can examine the net assets (difference between the assets and the liabilities) of a non-profit CCRC as declared in Form 990, filed with the IRS annually for their tax-exempt status, and may be accessed online. One way CCRC residents can develop trust for the information and decisions coming from their leadership is to have a resident representative on the CCRC governing board. States that require residents to be represented on governing boards of CCRCs include New Jersey, Maryland, District of Columbia, California, Ohio, and Oregon, although the resident-representatives in the latter three states have non-voting positions.

While rare, closures and bankruptcies of CCRCs do happen, as well as class action lawsuits. A 2014 class-action lawsuit, which alleged that the CCRC Vi at Palo Alto funneled the residents' refundable entrance fees to its parent company without establishing a reserve fund as required by state law, was dismissed by a US District Court judge who ruled that, while the CCRC might be in violation of state law by not maintaining a cash reserve, the plaintiffs (CCRC residents) "lack[ed] standing in their civil claim" because they did not show that harm was done or was imminent. The residents appealed and in April 2020 the Appeals Court found that "the statutory violation of failing to maintain a refund reserve harms Residents by putting them in the distressing position of choosing between vacating the Vi and potentially risking non-repayment, or continuing to live at the Vi in a state of perceived financial insecurity." Subsequently, a proposed class action settlement was reached and a final hearing is scheduled in September 2022.

== Resident demographics ==
The average age of CCRCs entrants has shown a steady increase over time, from 76 in the 1970s, to 78 in the 1980s, to 79 in the 1990s. In 2009 the average age of entrants was about 80; in 2015 it was slightly above 81, continuing the increasing trend over time. Also on average, Type C entrants were older than Type B, who were older than Type A. Given the increasing average age of entry, projections of future CCRC entrants and demands/contracts for CCRCs have to be re-evaluated.

At entry, the average life expectancy is 10 to 12 years, although individual life expectancy can vary with entry age, gender, health, etc. The average resident can expect to spend roughly 3/4 of their lifetime at a CCRC in the independent living, 1/8 in the assisted living, and 1/8 in the skilled nursing, which again can vary with entry age, gender, health, etc.

In 2015, the average annual income of new residents ranged from a low of about $20,000 to a high of about $264,000, with a median of about $66,000. The average net worth of new residents ranged from a low of about $223,000 to a high of about $5,900,000, with a median of about $1,120,000. Although these figures are from only 46 CCRCs, they are indicative that some CCRCs are attractive to affluent residents.

The average age of the CCRC residents have also increased over time, from about 80 in 1980s to above 85 in 2010s.

== See also ==
- Elderly care
- Elder law
- Geriatrics
- Home care
- Nursing home
- Old age
- Pensioner
- Retirement community
- Assisted living
- Independent living
