= Mildred Alexandra Symons =

Australian nurse

Sister Mildred Symmons
- Born: Mildred Alexandra Symmons; 1906; New South Wales, Australia
- Died: 10 July 1970 (aged 63–64); London
- Education: Royal Prince Alfred Hospital; The Women's Hospital, Sydney

Sister Mildred Symons was an Australian nurse. She was a pioneer in the aged care sector in New South Wales, and set up the Chesalon Aged Care homes in Sydney. She was also responsible for the establishment of the Parish Nursing Service.

== Life ==
After working for a number of years for the Sydney City Council, Symons left to train as a nurse at the Royal Prince Alfred Hospital in Sydney, followed by training in midwifery at The Women's Hospital in Crown Street, Sydney in 1933. She was an active member of the Australian Nurses' Christian Movement and after training worked at a private hospital where she became acting matron. Around 1937 she joined the nursing staff of the 'Bush Aid Society' and served in hospitals in Ceduna, Cook, Penong, and Tarcoola up until 1942. As the clergyman at Tarcoola left to work as a war chaplin she took on responsibility for the school and Sunday services. Around 1943 she returned to Sydney to care for her mother and father and it was this experience that led her to set up a nursing service for sick and elderly who had no one to care for them.

== Parish Nursing Service and The Chesalon Nursing Home ==
In 1944 she formed the Church of England Parish Nursing Service and The Chesalon Nursing Home to accomplish this goal. She was paid a salary of four pounds a week to travel on foot and by public transport to sponge, inject, and give treatments to people across Sydney parishes. She set up the first Chesalon Nursing home in Summer Hill, Sydney on 30 November 1952. By 1956 the service employed 24 nurses and made 13,600 visits to the homes of the aged and sick unable to afford normal nursing care. By the time of her death there was a Chesalon Nursing Home at Summer Hill, Harris Park, Eastwood, Beecroft, Chatswood, Woonona and Westmead. In 1963 Queen Elizabeth awarded her the Member of the Order of the British Empire. There is an Anglicare aged care facility named in her honour in Jannali, Sydney. Symons died in London on 10 July 1970 aged 64.
