= Lists of companies of the United States by state =

This is a list of companies in the United States by state where their headquarters is located:

== Hawaii ==
=== Current ===
- ABC Stores (Honolulu)
- Alexander & Baldwin (Honolulu)
- Aloha Petroleum (Honolulu)
- American Savings Bank (Honolulu)
- Aqua-Aston Hospitality (Honolulu)
- Bank of Hawaii (Honolulu)
- Central Pacific Bank (Honolulu)
- First Hawaiian Bank (Honolulu)
- Foodland Hawaii (Honolulu)
- Hawaii National Bank (Honolulu)
- Hawaiian Electric Industries (Honolulu)
- Hawaiian Telcom (Honolulu)
- Island Pacific Energy (Honolulu)
- Kamakura Corporation (Honolulu)
- Kauaʻi Island Utility Cooperative (Lihue)
- Matson, Inc. (Honolulu)
- Maui Land & Pineapple Company (Kapalua)
- Mauna Loa Macadamia Nut Corporation (Hilo)
- Mountain Apple Company (Honolulu)
- Outrigger Hotels & Resorts (Honolulu)
- Pacific LightNet (Honolulu)
- RevoluSun (Honolulu)
- Sullivan Family of Companies (Honolulu)
- Times Supermarkets (Honolulu)
- Tori Richard (Honolulu)
- Visionary Related Entertainment (Honolulu)

=== Former ===
- Blue Planet Software
- Code Rebel
- Phase2 International
- Shirokiya

== Indiana ==
=== Current ===
- 1st Source (South Bend)
- AES Indiana (Indianapolis)
- Allison Transmission (Indianapolis)
- AM General (South Bend)
- American Red Ball (Indianapolis)
- Angi (Indianapolis)
- Applied Instruments (Indianapolis)
- Arni's Restaurant (Lafayette)
- Atlas World Group (Evansville)
- Batesville Casket Company (Batesville)
- Berry Global (Evansville)
- Better World Books (Mishawaka)
- Calumet Specialty Products Partners (Indianapolis)
- Chicago South Shore and South Bend Railroad (Michigan City)
- CNO Financial Group (Carmel)
- Cummins (Columbus)
- DirectBuy (Merrillville)
- Do It Best (Fort Wayne)
- Elevance Health (Indianapolis)
- Eli Lilly and Company (Indianapolis)
- Elwood Staffing (Columbus)
- Emmis Corporation (Indianapolis)
- Finish Line, Inc. (Indianapolis)
- First Internet Bancorp (Indianapolis)
- First Merchants Corporation (Muncie)
- The Ford Meter Box Company (Wabash)
- Guidant (Indianapolis)
- Gurney's Seed and Nursery Company (Greendale)
- Haynes International (Kokomo)
- Herff Jones (Indianapolis)
- Hulman & Company (Terre Haute)
- Indiana Bell (Indianapolis)
- ITT Technical Institute (Carmel)
- JayC Food Stores (Seymour)
- Jayco (Middlebury)
- Kimball International (Jasper)
- Klipsch Audio Technologies (Indianapolis)
- Matthews Aurora Funeral Solutions (Aurora)
- MCL Cafeterias (Indianapolis)
- Midcontinent Independent System Operator (Carmel)
- Monarch Beverage, Inc. (Indianapolis)
- NiSource (Merrillville)
- Noble Roman's (Indianapolis)
- North American Van Lines (Fort Wayne)
- Old National Bank (Evansville)
- Paige's Music (Indianapolis)
- Republic Airways Holdings (Indianapolis)
- Salesforce Marketing Cloud (Indianapolis)
- Schurz Communications (South Bend)
- Shindigz (Fort Wayne)
- Shoe Carnival (Evansville)
- Simon Property Group (Indianapolis)
- Steak 'n Shake (Indianapolis)
- Steel Dynamics (Fort Wayne)
- Sweetwater Sound (Fort Wayne)
- Thermwood Corporation (Dale)
- Thor Industries (Elkhart)
- Three Floyds Brewing (Munster)
- Upland Brewing Company (Bloomington)
- Vera Bradley (Fort Wayne)
- Wabash National (Lafayette)
- Weaver Popcorn Company (Van Buren)
- Wheaton World Wide Moving (Indianapolis)
- Zimmer Biomet (Warsaw)

=== Former ===
- Biomet
- BrightPoint
- Buehler Foods
- Celadon Group
- Copient Technologies
- Golden Rule Insurance Company
- Harlan
- Marsh Supermarkets
- Ohio Falls Iron Works
- Owen's Market
- Scott's Food & Pharmacy
- Vectren

== Iowa ==
=== Current ===
- Casey's (Ankeny)
- Dubuque Bank and Trust (Dubuque)
- Fareway (Boone)
- Happy Joe's (Bettendorf)
- Hartig Drug (Dubuque)
- HNI Corporation (Muscatine)
- Hy-Vee (West Des Moines)
- Kum & Go (Des Moines)
- Lee Enterprises (Davenport)
- Maid-Rite (Urbandale)
- MidAmerican Energy Company (Des Moines)
- Musco Lighting (Oskaloosa)
- Norby's Farm Fleet (Dubuque)
- Pancheros Mexican Grill (Coralville)
- Pioneer Hi Bred International (Johnston)
- Pizza Ranch (Orange City)
- Principal Financial Group (Des Moines)
- Radio Dubuque (Dubuque)
- Right Stuf (Grimes)
- Vermeer Corporation (Pella)
- Von Maur (Davenport)
- West Liberty Foods (West Liberty)

=== Former ===
- Agriprocessors
- iWireless
- McLeodUSA
- Meredith Corporation
- Rockwell Collins

== Louisiana ==
=== Current ===
- Audiosocket (New Orleans)
- Copeland's (New Orleans)
- Entergy (New Orleans)
- Hornbeck Offshore Services (Covington)
- Lamar Advertising Company (Baton Rouge)
- LaPorte CPAs and Business Advisors (Metairie)
- Lumen Technologies (Monroe)
- McIlhenny Company (Avery Island)
- Porter Lyons (New Orleans)
- Raising Cane's Chicken Fingers (Baton Rouge)
- Taylor Energy (New Orleans)

=== Former ===
- Hibernia National Bank

== Maine ==
=== Current ===
- Casco Bay Lines (Portland)
- L.L.Bean (Freeport)
- Pioneer Telephone (Portland)
- Renys (Newcastle)
- Smokey's Greater Shows (Fryeburg)

=== Former ===
- The Freaky Bean Coffee Company
- TD Banknorth

== Maryland ==
=== Current ===
- Balducci's (Germantown)
- Black+Decker (Towson)
- Centrus Energy (Bethesda)
- Choice Hotels (Rockville)
- Constellation Energy (Baltimore)
- First Friday's Group (Baltimore)
- GEICO (Chevy Chase)
- Giant Food (Landover)
- GlobalStem (Gaithersburg)
- Goodwill Industries (Derwood)
- Herman Born & Sons (Baltimore)
- Host Hotels & Resorts (Bethesda)
- Jerry's Subs & Pizza (Gaithersburg)
- Ledo Pizza (Annapolis)
- Lockheed Martin (Bethesda)
- Marriott International (Bethesda)
- McCormick & Company (Hunt Valley)
- Perdue Farms (Salisbury)
- Piedmont Airlines (Salisbury)
- PRS Guitars (Stevensville)
- Roy Rogers Restaurants (Frederick)
- Shoppers Food & Pharmacy (Bowie)
- STX (Baltimore)
- Sylvan Learning (Baltimore)
- T. Rowe Price (Baltimore)
- Transamerica Corporation (Baltimore)
- Trophogen (Rockville)
- Under Armour (Baltimore)
- Urban One (Silver Spring)
- W. R. Grace and Company (Columbia)
- Westat (Rockville)
- Xometry (North Bethesda)
- ZeniMax Media (Rockville)

=== Former ===
- BlueHippo Funding
- Coventry Health Care
- Legg Mason
- Mars (supermarket)
- MedImmune

== Mississippi ==
=== Current ===
- Ablitech, Inc. (Hattiesburg)
- Ballet Magnificat! (Jackson)
- Bumpers Drive-In (Brookhaven)
- Cadence Bank (Tupelo)
- Cal-Maine Foods (Ridgeland)
- Cooperative Energy (Hattiesburg)
- CSpire (Ridgeland)
- Emmerich Newspapers (Jackson)
- Ergon, Inc. (Flowood)
- Fat Possum Records (Oxford)
- Hancock Whitney (Gulfport)
- Ingalls Shipbuilding (Pascagoula)
- Jr. Food Mart (Flowood)
- Keesler Federal Credit Union (Biloxi)
- Lazy Magnolia Brewing Company (Kiln)
- Loeb's (Meridian)
- Malaco Records (Jackson)
- Meucci Cues (Byhalia)
- Mississippi Power (Gulfport)
- Mossy Oak (West Point)
- Newk's (Jackson)
- Peavey Electronics (Meridian)
- Peoples Bank (Mendenhall)
- Renasant Bank (Tupelo)
- Sanderson Farms (Laurel)
- Sunbelt Federal Credit Union (Hattiesburg)
- Sycamore Bank (Senatobia)
- Triton Systems (Long Beach)
- Trustmark (Jackson)
- Tupelo Hardware (Tupelo)
- Viking Range (Greenwood)
- Ward's (Hattiesburg)
- Wicks n' More (Tupelo)

=== Former ===
- Fred's
- GreenTech Automotive
- MidSouth Rail Corporation

== Missouri ==
=== Current ===
- Ameren (St. Louis)
- Andy's Frozen Custard (Springfield)
- Anheuser-Busch (St. Louis)
- Arch Resources (St. Louis)
- B&B Theatres (Liberty)
- Baron Aviation Services (Vichy)
- Bass Pro Shops (Springfield)
- Caleres (Clayton)
- Centene Corporation (St. Louis)
- Columbia Insurance Group (Columbia)
- Commerce Bancshares (Kansas City)
- Dierbergs Markets (Chesterfield)
- Drury Hotels (Creve Coeur)
- Edward Jones Investments (St. Louis)
- Emerson Electric (Ferguson)
- Energizer (Town and Country)
- Enterprise Rent-A-Car (Clayton)
- Express Scripts (St. Louis County)
- Ferrellgas (Liberty)
- GoJet Airlines (Bridgeton)
- Graybar (Clayton)
- H&R Block (Kansas City)
- Hallmark Cards (Kansas City)
- Helzberg Diamonds (North Kansas City)
- Kansas City Life Insurance Company (Kansas City)
- Leggett & Platt (Carthage)
- Mayflower Transit (Fenton)
- Metropark Communications (St. Louis)
- MFA Oil (Columbia)
- Missouri Employers Mutual (Columbia)
- Olin Corporation (Clayton)
- Oracle Cerner (Kansas City)
- O'Reilly Auto Parts (Springfield)
- Orscheln Farm & Home (Moberly)
- Panera Bread (Fenton)
- Peabody Energy (St. Louis)
- Populous (Kansas City)
- Rawlings (St. Louis)
- Russell Stover Candies (Kansas City)
- Save-A-Lot (St. Ann)
- Schnucks (St. Louis)
- Shelter Insurance (Columbia)
- United Van Lines (Fenton)
- Winstead's (Kansas City)

=== Former ===
- A. G. Edwards
- Adam's Mark
- Aquila, Inc.
- Farmland Industries
- Great Plains Energy
- International Hat Company
- Interstate Bakeries
- Kansas City Southern
- McCabe-Powers Body Company
- Monsanto
- Ralston Purina
- Shop 'n Save
- Smithfield Hog Production Division
- Solutia
- Suddenlink Communications
- Trans States Airlines
- Wehrenberg Theatres

== Montana ==
=== Current ===
- Big Sky Brewing Company (Missoula)
- Bridger Aerospace (Belgrade)
- Conlin's Furniture (Billings)
- Corporate Air (Billings)
- First Interstate BancSystem (Billings)
- KOA (Billings)
- Merlin Airways (Billings)
- RightNow Technologies (Bozeman)
- Shiloh Rifle Manufacturing Company (Big Timber)
- Town Pump (Butte)

=== Former ===
- Big Sky Airlines
- Semitool

== Nebraska ==
=== Current ===
- Berkshire Hathaway (Omaha)
- Buckle (Kearney)
- Cabela's (Sidney)
- First National Bank of Omaha (Omaha)
- Fort Western Stores (Nebraska City)
- Godfather's Pizza (Omaha)
- Gorat's (Omaha)
- HobbyTown USA (Lincoln)
- Intrado (Omaha)
- Kiewit Corporation (Omaha)
- Mutual of Omaha (Omaha)
- Nelnet (Lincoln)
- Omaha Star (Omaha)
- Omaha Steaks (Omaha)
- Union Pacific Railroad (Omaha)
- Werner Enterprises (Omaha)

=== Former ===
- Affiliated Foods Midwest
- Douglas Theatre Company
- Gordmans
- Mister C's

== Nevada ==
- Allegiant Air (Summerlin)
- Bally Technologies (Enterprise)
- Boyd Gaming (Las Vegas)
- Bushmaster Firearms International (Carson City)
- Caesars Entertainment (Reno)
- Diamond Resorts (Las Vegas)
- Everi Holdings (Spring Valley)
- Grand Canyon Scenic Airlines (Paradise)
- Las Vegas Sands (Paradise)
- MGM Resorts International (Paradise)
- NV Energy (Las Vegas)
- Port of Subs (Reno)
- Primaris Airlines (Enterprise)
- Scolari's Food and Drug (Sparks)
- Shelby American (Enterprise)
- Sierra Nevada Corporation (Sparks)
- Southwest Gas (Las Vegas)
- Station Casinos (Summerlin South)
- Terrible Herbst (Paradise)
- Wynn Resorts (Paradise)
- Zappos (Las Vegas)

=== Former ===
- Nevada Power Company

== New Hampshire ==
=== Current ===
- Brookstone (Merrimack)
- C&S Wholesale Grocers (Keene)
- Cole Haan (Greenland)
- DEKA (Manchester)
- PC Connection (Merrimack)
- State Line Tack (Plaistow)
- Timberland (Stratham)
- Wiggins Airways (Manchester)

=== Former ===
- Boston-Maine Airways
- Vantix Diagnostics

== New Jersey ==
- Acsis
- American Standard Companies
- Automatic Data Processing
- Avaya
- Avis Budget Group
- B&G Foods
- Becton Dickinson
- Bed Bath & Beyond
- Benjamin Moore & Co.
- Bradco Supply
- Burlington Coat Factory
- Campbell's
- Catalent
- Ce De Candy, Inc.
- Celgene
- Century 21 Real Estate
- The Children's Place
- Chubb Corp.
- Church and Dwight
- Coach USA
- Commerce Bancorp
- Comodo Group
- Cooper Chemical Company
- Curtiss-Wright
- Cytec Industries
- DRS Technologies
- Emerson Radio
- Foodtown
- Foster Wheeler Corporation
- The Great Atlantic and Pacific Tea Company (Farmer Jack, Food Basics USA, The Food Emporium, Sav-A-Center, Super Fresh, Waldbaum's)
- H. H. Gregg
- Hartz Mountain Industries
- Hovnanian Enterprises
- Hudson City Bancorp
- IDT Corp.
- Ingersoll Rand - operational headquarters
- Jackson Hewitt
- Jersey Mike's Subs
- Johnson & Johnson
- Kenvue
- Liberty Travel
- Linens 'n Things
- Louis Berger Group
- Maidenform
- Medarex
- Medco Health Solutions
- Merck
- MTBC
- New England Motor Freight
- New Jersey Resources
- Pathmark Stores
- Peterson's
- Pinnacle Foods
- PNY Technologies
- Prince Sports
- Prudential Financial
- Public Service Electric and Gas Company
- R. R. Bowker
- RCI
- Reckitt Benckiser North America
- Schering-Plough
- Sixth Avenue Electronics
- Spencer's Gifts
- TD Bank
- Toys "R" Us
- Unigene Laboratories
- Valley National Bank
- VoicePulse
- Vonage
- Wakefern Food Corporation/ShopRite (Inserra Supermarkets)
- Weeks Marine
- Wyeth
- Wyndham Worldwide

== New Mexico ==
=== Current ===
- Blake's Lotaburger (Albuquerque)
- Deep Web Technologies (Santa Fe)
- Laguna Development Corporation (Albuquerque)
- PNM Resources (Albuquerque)
- Summit Electric Supply (Albuquerque)

=== Former ===
- Eclipse Aviation
- New Mexico Airlines
- Prediction Company
- Thornburg Mortgage

== North Carolina ==
- 3C Institute
- ACN Inc.
- Advance Auto Parts
- Albemarle Corporation
- Alex Lee Inc.
- AM Racing
- American Spirit Media
- American Tire Distributors
- Atrium Health
- Baen Books
- Bahakel Communications
- Bandwidth
- Bank of America
- Belk
- Bernhardt Design
- The Biltmore Company
- Biltmore Farms
- BioCryst Pharmaceuticals
- Biscuitville
- Bojangles' Famous Chicken 'n Biscuits
- BonWorth
- Boone Drug
- Brighthouse Financial
- Burt's Bees
- Butterball
- Capitol Broadcasting Company
- CaptiveAire Systems
- Carolina Academic Press
- Carolina Biological Supply Company
- Carolina Foods
- Carquest
- Carr Amplifiers
- Cary Audio Design
- Cato Corporation
- Cedar Fair (executive offices)
- CenterEdge Software
- Champion
- ChannelAdvisor
- Charles & Colvard
- Coastal Studios
- Coca-Cola Bottling Co. Consolidated
- Collins Aerospace
- Columbia Forest Products
- CommScope
- Consonus
- Cook Out
- Crescent Communities
- Crowder Construction Company
- Curtis Media Group
- Curtiss-Wright
- D.H. Griffin Companies
- Deere-Hitachi Construction Machinery
- Deltec Homes
- Dentsply Sirona
- Dole plc (US headquarters)
- Duke Energy
- Earth Fare
- Enpro Industries
- Environmental Performance Vehicles
- Epic Games
- ESPNU
- Extended Stay America
- Family Dollar
- Firefly Balloons
- First Bancorp
- First Citizens BancShares
- Food Lion
- The Fresh Market
- Front Row Motorsports
- Furnitureland South
- Fusion3
- Fuzzy Logix
- G1 Therapeutics
- Geoff Bodine Racing
- Ginn Racing
- Glen Raven, Inc.
- Golden Corral
- Graco
- Growler Manufacturing and Engineering
- Haas F1 Team
- Haas Factory Team
- Hanesbrands
- Harris Teeter
- HDG International Group
- Hendrick Motorsports
- HomeTrust Bancshares
- Honda Aero
- Honda Aircraft Company
- Honeywell
- HSM
- Hwy 55 Burgers Shakes & Fries
- Hyak Motorsports
- The Iconfactory
- Ingersoll Rand
- Ingles
- IntelliScanner Corporation
- ITG Brands
- Jaggaer
- Jeld-Wen
- Jennifer Jo Cobb Racing
- Jerry's Artarama
- Jimmy Means Racing
- Joe Gibbs Racing
- JR Motorsports
- K&W Cafeterias
- Kayser-Roth
- Kidde
- Kontoor Brands
- Koury Corporation
- Krispy Kreme
- LabCorp
- Lance Inc.
- LendingTree
- Lichty Guitars
- Liggett Group
- Limited Run Games
- Little Diversified Architectural Consulting
- Live Oak Bank
- Lenovo (operational headquarters)
- Locus Biosciences
- Lolly Wolly Doodle
- Lord Corporation
- Lowe's
- Lowes Foods
- Ludwig Drums
- MAACO
- Mack Trucks
- Martin Marietta Materials
- McFarland & Company
- McKinney
- Mechanics and Farmers Bank
- Meineke Car Care Centers
- Melon Bicycles
- Merge Records
- Microsoft (East Coast headquarters)
- Microtech Knives
- Mistral Group
- Moog Music
- MotorAve
- Mt. Olive Pickle Company
- Mountain Air Cargo
- Nantahala Outdoor Center
- NASCAR
- Nascent Republic Records
- National Gypsum
- Nautilus Productions
- nCino
- NEMCO Motorsports
- North Carolina Mutual Life Insurance Company
- Novant Health
- Nucor
- Odell Associates
- Old Dominion Freight Line
- Pamlico Capital
- The Pantry (Cary)
- Petty GMS Motorsports
- Piedmont Natural Gas
- Plant Delights Nursery
- PrecisionHawk
- PredictifyMe
- Premier, Inc.
- Progress Energy Inc
- Purolator Filters
- Putt-Putt Fun Center
- Qorvo
- Rack Room Shoes
- Red Hat
- Red Oak Brewery
- Red Storm Entertainment
- Redeye Distribution
- Reeds Jewelers
- Replacements, Ltd.
- Reynolds American
- RFK Racing
- Rick Ware Racing
- Richard Childress Racing
- Roses Stores
- RSC Brands
- Saint Benedict Press
- Salsarita's Fresh Mexican Grill
- SAS Institute
- Sealed Air
- Sealy Corporation
- Shearline Boatworks
- Shoe Show
- Showmars
- Shurtape Technologies
- Smithfield's Chicken 'N Bar-B-Q
- Snyder's-Lance
- Social Blade
- Sonic Automotive
- Southern Bank
- Southern Express
- Speed
- Speedball
- Speedway Motorsports
- Spire Sports + Entertainment
- SplendidCRM
- Spoonflower
- SPX Corporation
- SS-Green Light Racing
- Syneos Health
- Tanger Factory Outlet Centers
- Team Penske
- Tengion
- Thomas Built Buses
- Thorlo Inc.
- TigerSwan
- Tommy Baldwin Racing
- Triad Racing Technologies
- Truist Financial
- TW Garner Food Company
- US Legend Cars
- Valencell
- Virtual Heroes
- Vontier
- Wells Fargo (Wells Fargo Securities)
- Wheatstone Corporation
- Wolfspeed
- Wood Brothers Racing
- WORX (North American headquarters)
- Wyndham Capital Mortgage
- Yep Roc Records
- Zaloni

== Ohio ==
- Abercrombie & Fitch
- ABX Air
- Acme Fresh Market
- Aeronca Aircraft
- AirNet Express
- Airstream
- AK Steel
- Aleris International
- Alien Workshop
- American Electric Power
- American Financial Group
- American Greetings
- AmTrust Bank
- Applied Industrial Technologies
- Argus
- Armored Trunk Manufacturing Company
- Babcock & Wilcox
- Bath & Body Works
- Battelle Memorial Institute
- Big Lots
- bigg's
- Bob Evans Restaurants
- Caliber System
- Cardinal Health
- CareSource
- Castle Aviation
- Cedar Fair
- Charley's Grilled Subs
- Charter One Bank
- Chiquita Brands International
- Cincinnati Financial
- Cintas
- Cleveland-Cliffs
- Commerce National Bank
- Convergys
- Cooper Tire & Rubber Company
- Cor-Bon/Glaser
- Crown Equipment Corporation
- Dana Holding Corporation
- Diebold
- Donatos Pizza
- Dorothy Lane Market
- DPL
- E.W. Scripps Company
- Eaton Corporation
- Elder-Beerman
- ERC
- Esther Price Candies
- Euclid-Hitachi Heavy Equipment
- Evenflo Company
- Federated Department Stores
- Ferro Corporation
- Fifth Third Bank
- FirstEnergy
- Forest City Enterprises
- GE Aerospace
- Gojo Industries
- Gold Star Chili
- Goodyear
- Grand Aire Express
- Grismer
- Heinen's Fine Foods
- Hexion Specialty Chemicals
- Hi-Point Firearms/Beemiller
- Hitachi Medical Systems America
- Hobart Corporation
- Hollister Co.
- Holtkamp Organ Company
- Huffy
- Huntington Bancshares
- Industramark
- Invacare
- The J.M. Smucker Co.
- Jo Ann Stores
- Kettering Health Network
- Key Bank
- Kroger
- Lane Bryant
- LensCrafters
- LexisNexis
- Limited Brands
- Lincoln Electric
- Lubrizol
- Malley's Chocolates
- Manor Care
- Marathon Petroleum Company
- Marc's
- Matco Tools
- Mayfran International
- Max & Erma's
- Medical Mutual of Ohio
- Mike-sell's
- Moen
- Motoman
- NACCO Industries
- National City Corporation
- Nationwide Insurance
- Nestlé USA - Prepared Foods Division
- NewPage Corporation
- Owens Corning
- Owens-Illinois
- Park National Bank (FBOP)
- Park National Bank (Ohio)
- Parker Hannifin
- Pearle Opticians
- PolyOne Corporation
- Premier Health Partners
- Procter & Gamble
- Progressive Corporation
- PSA Airlines
- Rax Restaurants
- Retail Ventures, operates DSW, Inc. and Value City
- The Reynolds and Reynolds Company
- RIDGID Tool Company
- RPM International
- Scailex Corporation
- Scotts Miracle-Gro Company
- Sherwin-Williams Company
- Skybus Airlines
- Skyline Chili
- Speedway SuperAmerica
- Steak Escape
- Sunglass Hut International
- Sunny Delight Beverages
- Teradata
- Thor Industries
- Timken Company
- Trans States Airlines, operates as AmericanConnection
- TransDigm Group
- TravelCenters of America
- Tween Brands
- United States Playing Card Company
- Vertiv
- Victoria's Secret
- Vitacode
- The Wendy's Company
- Western & Southern Financial Group
- Westfield Insurance
- White Castle
- Worthington Industries
- Yellow Corporation

== Oklahoma ==
- Beaujon Aircraft (Ardmore)
- Groendyke Transport (Enid)
- Homeland (Oklahoma City)
- LegalShield (Ada)
- Reasor's (Tulsa)
- Zivko Aeronautics (Guthrie)

== Pennsylvania ==
- Airgas (Allentown)
- Alcoa
- Allen Organ Company (Macungie)
- Armstrong World Industries (Lancaster)
- Associated Wholesalers (Robesonia)
- Blair Corporation (Warren)
- The Bon-Ton Stores (York)
- Boscov's (Reading)
- Bruster's Ice Cream (Bridgewater)
- Burpee Seeds (Warminster)
- Cephalon (Frazer)
- Charming Shoppes (Bensalem)
- Conestoga Wood Specialties (East Earl)
- Crayola LLC (Easton), also makers of Silly Putty
- David's Bridal (Conshohocken)
- Dentsply International (York)
- Dick's Sporting Goods (Coraopolis)
- Eat'n Park (Homestead)
- Eclat Chocolate
- Equitable Resources
- Erie Insurance Group
- FMC Corp.
- Frankford Candy & Chocolate Company
- GE Transportation Systems
- General Nutrition Centers
- Genesis HealthCare
- Giant Food of Carlisle, Pennsylvania
- Gilson Snow
- H. J. Heinz Company
- Harsco Corporation
- Hatfield Quality Meats
- Hershey Foods Corporation
- Ikon Office Solutions
- JLG Industries
- Jones Apparel Group
- Just Born
- Kenexa Corporation
- Kennametal
- Knoll
- Lincoln National Corporation
- Loud Brothers
- MAACO
- Mack Trucks
- Majestic Athletic
- Meadows Frozen Custard
- Mellon Financial
- Natrona Bottling Company
- NCO Group
- New Era Tickets
- New Penn (trucking)
- Penn National Gaming
- Pep Boys Manny Moe & Jack (auto)
- PNC Financial Services
- PPG Industries
- PPL
- QVC
- Respironics, Inc.
- Rite Aid Corporation
- Rodale, Inc.
- Rohm and Haas
- Select Medical Corporation
- Sovereign Bank
- Spring Garden National Bank, dissolved 1891
- STV Group
- SunGard
- Sunoco
- Teleflex, Inc.
- Toll Brothers
- TransDigm Group
- Triumph Group
- UGI Corporation, holding company of AmeriGas Partners, L.P.
- Unisys
- Universal Health Services
- Urban Outfitters
- U.S. Steel
- USA 3000 Airlines
- USF Glen Moore
- USX
- The Vanguard Group
- ViroPharma
- Vishay Intertechnology
- VWR International
- Weis Markets
- WESCO International
- Wilbur Chocolate Company
- Woolrich
- Zippo

== South Carolina ==
- AgFirst (Columbia)
- Denny's (Spartanburg)
- Park Seed Company (Greenwood)
- Sonoco (Hartsville)
- Struthers-Dunn (Timmonsville)

== South Dakota ==
=== Current ===
- Avera Health (Sioux Falls)
- Black Hills Ammunition (Rapid City)
- Black Hills Corporation (Rapid City)
- Black Hills Institute of Geological Research (Hill City)
- Dakota Style (Clark)
- Daktronics (Brookings)
- First National Bank South Dakota (Yankton)
- First Premier Bank (Sioux Falls)
- The HomeSlice Group (Sturgis)
- Lewis Drug (Sioux Falls)
- Midco (Sioux Falls)
- NorthWestern Energy (Sioux Falls)
- Pathward (Sioux Falls)
- Pheasant Restaurant and Lounge (Brookings)
- Pizza Cheeks (Sioux Falls)
- POET (Sioux Falls)
- Rainbow Play Systems (Brookings)
- Raven Industries (Sioux Falls)
- Sonifi Solutions (Sioux Falls)
- Wall Drug (Wall)
- Western Surety Company (Sioux Falls)

=== Former ===
- Amiga, Inc.
- Great Western Bank
- Home Federal Bank
- Iowa, Chicago and Eastern Railroad
- VeraSun Energy

== Tennessee ==
=== Current ===
- AC Entertainment (Knoxville)
- American Residential Services (Memphis), also known as ARS/Rescue Rooter
- AutoZone (Memphis)
- Averitt Express (Cookeville)
- Boss Hoss Cycles (Dyersburg)
- Bush Brothers and Company (Knoxville)
- Centriworks (Knoxville)
- Chattem (Chattanooga)
- Community Health Systems (Franklin)
- Covenant Logistics (Chattanooga)
- Cracker Barrel (Lebanon)
- CTSI-Global (Memphis)
- Dollar General (Goodlettsville)
- Double Cola Company (Chattanooga)
- Eastman Chemical Company (Kingsport)
- EdFinancial Services (Knoxville)
- Elvis Presley Enterprises (Memphis)
- FedEx (Memphis)
- First Horizon Bank (Memphis)
- Hardee's (Franklin)
- IdleAir (Knoxville)
- International Paper (Memphis)
- Jack Daniel's Distillery (Lynchburg)
- Jiffy Steamer (Union City)
- King Pharmaceuticals (Bristol)
- Lennys Grill & Subs (Memphis)
- Lodge (South Pittsburg)
- Malco Theatres (Memphis)
- Malibu Boats (Loudon)
- MasterCraft (Vonore)
- McKee Foods (Collegedale)
- Memphis Light, Gas and Water (Memphis)
- Nissan USA (Smyrna)
- Old Time Pottery (Murfreesboro)
- Oreck Corporation (Cookeville)
- Pal's (Kingsport)
- Petro's Chili & Chips (Knoxville)
- Pilot Flying J (Knoxville)
- PooPrints (Knoxville)
- Regal Cinemas (Knoxville)
- Ruby Tuesday (Maryville)
- Servpro (Gallatin)
- Singer Corporation (La Vergne)
- STR, Inc (Hendersonville)
- Tennessee Valley Authority (Knoxville)
- Tractor Supply Company (Brentwood)
- Unum (Chattanooga)
- Varsity Brands (Memphis)
- Weigel's (Powell)

=== Former ===
* Fred's - ceased operation in 2019
- Memphis Furniture - ceased operation in 1983
- Olan Mills - acquired by Lifetouch in 2011

== Vermont ==
=== Current ===
- Ben & Jerry's (South Burlington)
- Bruegger's (Burlington)
- Burton Snowboards (Burlington)
- National Life Group (Montpelier)
- Orvis (Sunderland)
- Tuttle Publishing (North Clarendon)

=== Former ===
- AirNow

== Virginia ==
=== Current ===
- American Woodmark (Winchester)
- Amerigroup (Virginia Beach)
- Boeing Defense, Space & Security (Arlington County)
- Bowlero Corporation (Mechanicsville)
- Brink's (Richmond)
- CACI (Reston)
- Capital One (McLean)
- CarMax (Richmond)
- Dollar Tree (Chesapeake)
- Dominion Energy (Richmond)
- Estes Express Lines (Richmond)
- Ferguson Enterprises (Newport News)
- Five Guys (Alexandria)
- Food City (Abingdon)
- Freddie Mac (Tysons)
- Gannett (Tysons)
- GE Automation & Controls (Charlottesville)
- General Dynamics (Reston)
- Genworth Financial (Richmond)
- Interstate Van Lines (Springfield)
- L-3 Flight International Aviation (Newport News)
- Landmark Media Enterprises (Norfolk)
- Liberty Tax
- Markel Group (Richmond)
- Mars Inc. (McLean)
- Medeco (Roanoke County)
- NVR, Inc. (Reston)
- Owens & Minor (Mechanicsville)
- Rolls-Royce North America (Reston)
- RTX Corporation (Arlington County)
- Smithfield Foods (Smithfield)
- Southern Exposure Seed Exchange (Mineral)
- Touchstone Energy (Arlington County)
- Trailways Transportation System (Fairfax)
- Ukrop's Food Group (Richmond)
- Universal Corporation (Richmond)
- Velocity Micro (Richmond)

=== Former ===
- Circuit City - defunct in 2009
- Colgan Air - ceased operations in 2012
- Compass Airlines
- DynCorp - defunct in 2021
- Farm Fresh Food & Pharmacy
- LandAmerica Financial Group
- Massey Energy - acquired by Alpha Natural Resources
- MAXjet Airways - filed for Chapter 11 Bankruptcy and ceased operations
- MeadWestvaco - combined with RockTenn to form WestRock
- Nextel
- NII Holdings - defunct in 2020
- Reynolds Group Holdings - defunct in 2020
- SCG International Risk

== West Virginia ==
=== Current ===
- Champion Industries (Huntington)
- Country Club Bakery (Fairmont)
- Gabe's (Morgantown)
- Gino's Pizza and Spaghetti (Huntington)
- GoMart (Gassaway)
- HD Media (Huntington)
- International Coal Group (Teays Valley)
- Jackson Kelly (Charleston)
- The Library Corporation (Inwood)
- Marquee Cinemas (Beckley)
- Ogden Newspapers (Wheeling)
- Service Pump & Supply (Huntington)
- Tudor's Biscuit World (Huntington)
- West Virginia MetroNews (Charleston)
- Woodcraft Supply (Parkersburg)

=== Former ===
- Diamond Alkali
- West Virginia Media Holdings
- Wheeling-Pittsburgh Steel - acquired then liquidated

== Wisconsin ==
=== Current ===
- A. O. Smith (Milwaukee)
- ABC Supply (Beloit)
- ABS Global (DeForest)
- Acuity Insurance (Sheboygan)
- Air Wisconsin (Appleton)
- Allen Edmonds (Port Washington)
- Alliance Laundry Systems (Ripon)
- Alliant Energy (Madison)
- American Family Insurance (Madison)
- Amsoil (Superior)
- Ariens (Brillion)
- Ashley Furniture Industries (Arcadia)
- Associated Banc-Corp (Green Bay)
- Astronautics Corporation of America (Oak Creek)
- Bay Shipbuilding Company (Sturgeon Bay)
- Ben Franklin (Mount Pleasant)
- Blain's Farm & Fleet (Janesville)
- Brady Corporation (Milwaukee)
- Briggs & Stratton (Wauwatosa)
- Broaster Company (Beloit)
- Carmex (Franklin)
- Case IH (Racine)
- Colony Brands (Monroe)
- Cousins Subs (Menomonee Falls)
- Culver's (Prairie du Sac)
- Dairyland Power Cooperative (La Crosse)
- Duluth Trading Company (Mount Horeb)
- Electronic Theatre Controls (Middleton)
- Enerpac Tool Group (Menomonee Falls)
- Epic Systems (Verona)
- Exact Sciences Corporation (Madison)
- Experimental Aircraft Association (Oshkosh)
- Fairbanks Morse Defense (Beloit)
- Festival Foods (Onalaska)
- Fiserv (Milwaukee)
- Fleet Farm (Appleton)
- Fraser Shipyards (Superior)
- Freight Runners Express (Milwaukee)
- Gehl Company (West Bend)
- Generac (Waukesha)
- Good Karma Brands (Milwaukee)
- Green Bay Packaging (Green Bay)
- Gundersen Health System (La Crosse)
- Harken (Pewaukee)
- Harley-Davidson (Milwaukee)
- Hendricks Holding Company (Beloit)
- Jockey International (Kenosha)
- Johnson Outdoors (Racine)
- Johnsonville Foods (Sheboygan Falls)
- Kohler Co. (Kohler)
- Kohl's (Menomonee Falls)
- Kopp's Frozen Custard (Greenfield)
- Koss Corporation (Milwaukee)
- Kwik Trip (La Crosse)
- La Crosse Technology (La Crosse)
- Lake Express (Milwaukee)
- Lands' End (Dodgeville)
- ManpowerGroup (Milwaukee)
- Marcus Corporation (Milwaukee)
- Marine Credit Union (La Crosse)
- Fincantieri Marinette Marine (Marinette)
- Mars Cheese Castle (Kenosha)
- Marten Transport (Mondovi)
- Master Lock (Oak Creek)
- Menards (Eau Claire)
- Mercury Marine (Fond du Lac)
- MGE Energy (Madison)
- MGIC Investment Corporation (Milwaukee)
- Michels Corporation (Brownsville)
- Milio's Sandwiches (Fitchburg)
- Miller Electric (Appleton)
- Milwaukee Tool (Milwaukee)
- Miron Construction (Neenah)
- Modine Manufacturing (Racine)
- Montgomery Ward (Monroe)
- National Presto Industries (Eau Claire)
- Neenah Foundry (Neenah)
- Northwestern Mutual (Milwaukee)
- Omanhene Cocoa Bean Company (Milwaukee)
- Organic Valley (La Farge)
- Oshkosh Corporation (Oshkosh)
- Pacific Cycle (Madison)
- Penzeys Spices (Wauwatosa)
- PlayMonster (Beloit)
- Promega (Madison)
- Quad (Sussex)
- Quest CE (Milwaukee)
- Regal Rexnord (Milwaukee)
- Renaissance Learning (Wisconsin Rapids)
- Rite-Hite (Milwaukee)
- Rockwell Automation (Milwaukee)
- Rocky Rococo (Oconomowoc)
- Roehl Transport (Marshfield)
- Roundy's (Milwaukee)
- S. C. Johnson & Son (Racine)
- Schneider National (Green Bay)
- Schreiber Foods (Green Bay)
- Sentry Foods (Milwaukee)
- Sentry Insurance (Stevens Point)
- Skyward (Stevens Point)
- Snap-on (Kenosha)
- Spancrete (Waukesha)
- Spectrum Brands (Middleton)
- Spot Filmworks (Madison)
- Sprecher Brewery (Glendale)
- Sub-Zero (Madison)
- The Manitowoc Company (Milwaukee)
- Trek Bicycle Corporation (Waterloo)
- Twin Disc (Milwaukee)
- Uline (Pleasant Prairie)
- Wausau Homes (Wausau)
- WEC Energy Group (Milwaukee)
- Western States Envelope & Label (Butler)
- Wisconsin and Southern Railroad (Madison)
- Wisconsin Bell (Milwaukee)
- Wisconsin Great Northern Railroad (Trego)
- Wisconsin Public Service Corporation (Green Bay)
- Woodman's Markets (Janesville)

=== Former ===
- Beloit Corporation — filed for bankruptcy in 2000
- Bemis Company — acquired by Amcor
- Bucyrus-Erie — acquired by Caterpillar Inc.
- Case Corporation — merged into CNH Global
- Evinrude Outboard Motors — discontinued in 2020
- Firstar Corporation — merged into U.S. Bancorp
- G. Heileman Brewing Company — acquired
- Johnson Controls — now based in Cork, Ireland
- Journal Media Group — defunct
- Joy Global — acquired by Komatsu Limited
- LaCrosse Footwear — moved to Portland, Oregon
- Marshall & Ilsley — acquired by Bank of Montreal
- Metavante — acquired by FIS
- Midwest Airlines — merged with Frontier Airlines
- Oscar Mayer — former Madison headquarters closed by Kraft Heinz
- Shopko — defunct
- Skyway Airlines — ceased operations in 2008
- Trane — now part of Trane Technologies
- TSR, Inc. — acquired by Wizards of the Coast
- West Bend Company — acquired
- Western Publishing — defunct

== See also ==
- List of construction companies in the United States by state
