= Park National Bank =

Park National Bank may refer to:

- Park National Bank (Ohio), a division of Park National Corp.
- Park National Bank (FBOP), an FBOP division, based in Chicago, Illinois
