= Vantix Diagnostics =

- Industry: Biotechnology
- Founded: 2010, Cambridge
- Founder: Richard Wardle
- Defunct: 2019
- Headquarters: Pelham, United States
- Website: www.vantixdx.com

Vantix Diagnostics (formerly Universal Sensors) was a biotechnology company based in Cambridge, that developed and marketed in vitro diagnostics. Vantix had worked to develop a hand held device for detecting illicit drugs. The company was known for its biosensors. The company was founded in 2010 and went out of business in 2019.
