= Peoples Bank (Mendenhall, Mississippi) =

American community bank

- Type: Private company
- Industry: Financial services
- Founded: 1908; 118 years ago
- Founders: Colonel Sidney McLaurin and Dewitt Enoch
- Headquarters: Mendenhall, Mississippi, United States
- Area served: Central Mississippi
- Products: Banking services
- Website: www.peoplesbank-ms.com

Peoples Bank is an American community bank based in Mendenhall, Mississippi. Brick and mortar branches are located in Mississippi towns of Collins, Magee, Mendenhall and Richland in addition to ITM/ATM services in Puckett and New Hebron. Peoples Bank operates under a parent company Peoples Bancshares, Inc. and is affiliated with Peoples Bank Mortgage, based in North Charleston, South Carolina and Main Street Realty, based in Magee, Mississippi.

Peoples Bank is a community development financial institution (CDFI). This means that the financial institution provides credit and financial services to underbanked markets and populations.

Peoples Bank offers all types of lending and is a designated Preferred Lender with the U. S. Small Business Administration (SBA).

== History ==
Peoples Bank was founded in 1908. It was established by Colonel Sidney McLaurin and Dewitt Enoch in downtown Mendenhall, Mississippi. It is currently run by a fourth-generation CEO.
