= Trophogen =

Biotechnology company based in Rockville, Maryland, US

Trophogen, Inc.
- Company type: Private
- Industry: Biotechnology
- Founded: 2001
- Headquarters: Rockville, Maryland, 39 05' 48 N and 77 07'47 W
- Key people: Bruce Weintraub, COO & CSO; Mariusz Szkudlinski, VP Research and Development
- Number of employees: 7 (2013)
- Website: www.trophogen.com

Trophogen, Inc. is a biotechnology company based in Rockville, Maryland.

The company was founded in 2001 with Series A funding from Toucan Capital, focusing on the development of human and bovine high affinity glycoprotein hormone and related growth factor superagonist analogs for human infertility and animal superovulation, as well as targeted therapy and imaging of thyroid, ovarian, breast, prostate and testicular cancers.

== Technology ==
Trophogen's claims that it produces long acting superagonist effects by engineering new analogs to increase their affinity to the receptor. This is achieved by substituting certain amino acids in the receptor binding domain, increasing affinity up to 100 fold. The addition of neoglycosylation sites extends the half-life of those analogs without extensions or subunit linkers, improving treatment convenience by reducing the number of injections. Trophogen's technology represents the first successful design of super active analogs of glycoprotein hormones that shows major increases in bioactivity and exceeds results shown for other protein ligands

== Lead product candidates ==
1. Recombinant, long acting, high potency human FSH superagonist analog for infertility and elective egg banking.
2. Recombinant, long acting, high potency human TSH superagonist analog for imaging and treatment of thyroid cancer.
3. Recombinant, long acting, high potency bovine FSH superagonist analog for superovulation and embryo transfer in beef and dairy cows.
4. Recombinant, long acting, high potency equine CG superagonist analog for superovulation and embryo transfer in pigs.
5. Recombinant, long acting, high potency human VEGF superagonist for imaging and therapy of thyroid and multiple other cancers.
6. Recombinant, long acting, high potency human LH superagonist for infertility therapy.
7. Recombinant, long acting, high potency bovine LH superagonist analog for maintenance of pregnancy in beef and dairy cows.
8. Recombinant, long acting, high potency VEGF superagonist for imaging and therapy of thyroid and other cancers in dogs and other animals.
