= Norby's Farm Fleet =

Norbys Farm Fleet
- Company type: Family owned
- Industry: Retail
- Founded: 1962
- Founders: Loren and Connie Norby
- Headquarters: Dubuque, Iowa, USA
- Number of locations: 12 (2023)
- Products: Hunting and fishing equipment, appliances, houseware, automotive goods, apparel, hardware, lawn and garden supplies, paint, pet supplies, sporting goods, and tools.
- Website: www.norbysfarmfleet.com

Norbys Farm Fleet is a retail chain of farm supply stores. The stores sell hunting and fishing equipment, appliances, housewares, automotive goods, apparel, hardware, lawn and garden supplies, paint, pet supplies, sporting goods, and tools and a mix of products lines in animal health, livestock feed, workwear, fashion clothing, candy & snacks, and toys.

The company headquarters is located in Dubuque, and warehouse located in Independence, Iowa. Stores are located throughout Northeast Iowa and Central Kentucky.

Iowa Locations: Manchester, Oelwein, Independence, Iowa, West Union, Elkader, Decorah, Waverly, Grundy Center, Sumner, and Eldora.

Kentucky Locations: Lebanon and Harrodsburg.

== History ==
Loren and Connie Norby started Norbys Farm Fleet in Manchester, Iowa in 1962. Since that time Norbys Farm Fleet has added 9 more stores to the following Northeast Iowa communities; Oelwein in 1966, Independence in 1968, West Union in 1970, Elkader in 1974, Decorah in 1987, Waverly in 1995, Grundy Center in 2003, Sumner in April 2005, Eldora in 2019 and in Lebanon, KY in December 2008 . Since this time Norbys built a new Manchester store. After the store was completed Connie Norby donated the previous Manchester store to Camp Courageous. The new Manchester location opened in the Winter of 2018. From 2018 into 2019 Norbys expanded the Oelwein location into a vacant building. The new Oelwein location opened early spring of 2019. Since this expansion Norbys added a brand new location in Eldora, Iowa and Harrodsburg, Kentucky. The company is still a family business with the third generation managing day-to-day operations.
