= CareCloud =

American healthcare company

CareCloud, Inc.
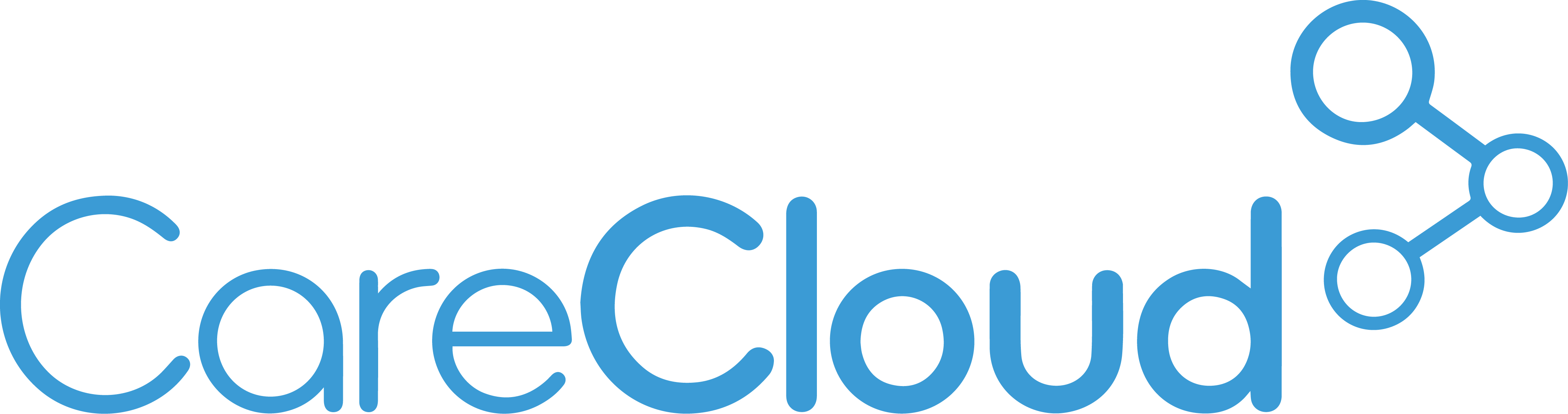
- Type: Public
- Traded as: Nasdaq: CCLD; Russell Microcap Index component
- Industry: Healthcare IT
- Founded: as MTBC 1999; 27 years ago
- Founder: Mahmud Haq
- Headquarters: New Jersey, U.S.
- Key people: Mahmud Haq (Executive Chairman); Stephan Snyder (CEO); A. Hadi Chaudhry (CSO)
- Products: Electronic Health Records; Practice Management; Medical Billing; Mobile Applications; Patient Engagement; Telehealth; Mobile Applications; Business intelligence
- Revenue: ▲US$120 million (2025)
- Net income: ▲US$10.8 million (2025)
- Number of employees: 3,600+
- Website: https://www.carecloud.com/

CareCloud, Inc. (formerly MTBC) is a publicly traded American healthcare information technology company that provides services, to healthcare providers and hospitals. The Company maintains its headquarters in Somerset, New Jersey, and employs approximately 4,000 workers worldwide.

CareCloud’s common stock trades on the Nasdaq Global Market under the ticker symbol “CCLD,” and its Series A (11%), and Series B (8.75%) Preferred Stocks trade on the Nasdaq Global Market under the ticker symbols “MTBCP” and “MTBCO.”

== History ==
CareCloud was founded as Medical Transcription Billing Corporation (MTBC) in 1999 by American entrepreneur Mahmud Haq. The earliest days of the company were focused on providing transcription and manual medical billing to healthcare providers primarily located in New Jersey.

In 2004, the company developed a fully integrated suite of services that includes a proprietary practice management platform, ONC-ACB, meaningful use stage 2 certified complete electronic health records software and a revenue cycle management service.

On June 6, 2013, former ambassador to Pakistan Cameron Munter joined MTBC's Board of Directors.

On July 23, 2014, the company went public on NASDAQ Capital Market under the ticker symbol "MTBC." The preferred stock trades under “MTBCP.”

In 2017, the company launched talkEHR, the industry’s first voice-enabled electronic health record.

In 2019, they changed the corporation name from Medical Transcription Billing Corp. to MTBC, Inc.

In 2021, MTBC changed its name to CareCloud, Inc., adopting the name of the company it had acquired the previous year.

The company also has operations in Pakistan and Sri Lanka.

== Acquisitions ==
Post-IPO, the company (as MTBC) made 16 acquisitions including revenue cycle management and healthcare IT companies in the United States. Some of the key acquisitions include Gulf Coast Billing (2016), Renaissance Physician Services (2016), MediGain (2016), Orion (2018).

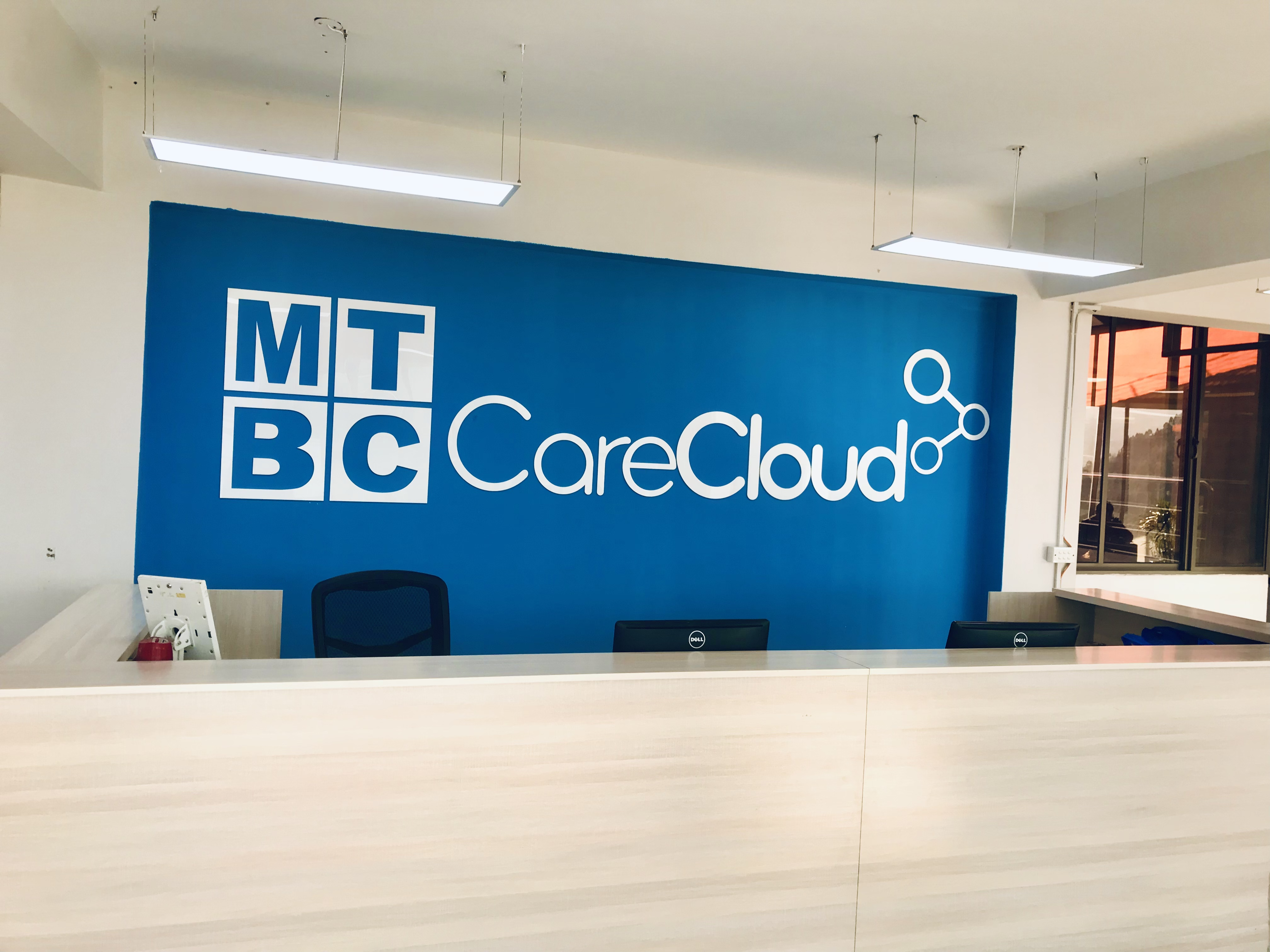
CareCloud's office in Bagh, Azad Jammu Kashmir

In 2020, MTBC made two major acquisitions of healthcare technology companies: CareCloud Corporation, a Miami-based company founded by Albert Santalo in 2009, and Meridian Medical Management, for reportedly up to $40M and $24.8M, respectively. In 2021, MTBC renamed itself CareCloud, Inc., taking the acquired company's name.

== Products and services ==
CareCloud offers Software-as-a-Service (or SaaS) platform that includes revenue cycle management (RCM), business intelligence, telehealth, practice management (PM) electronic health record (EHR), patient experience management (PXM), Robotic Process Automation (RPA), and solutions for high-performance medical groups.
