= Ablitech, Inc. =

- Industry: Biotechnology
- Founded: 2006
- Founder: Dr. Lisa Kemp; Dr. Nick Hammond; Dr. Kenneth Malone
- Headquarters: Baltimore, Maryland

Ablitech, Inc. is a biotechnology company founded in Hattiesburg, Mississippi, that specializes in the development and commercialization of platform technologies that heal and protect the human body. The corporation relocated to Baltimore, Maryland in early 2012 and is located at the University of Maryland BioPark.

== History ==
Ablitech was co-founded in 2006 by Dr. Lisa Kemp, Dr. Nick Hammond and Dr. Kenneth Malone on technology licensed from The University of Southern Mississippi.

The formation of Ablitech was a direct result of the National Science Foundation program IGERT – an “interdisciplinary training program, educating U.S. Ph.D. scientists and engineers by building on the foundations of their disciplinary knowledge with interdisciplinary training.”

In 2007, Ablitech received a SBIR Phase I for the development of a bio-transformable drug-eluting coronary stent. Then in 2008 they received another SBIR Phase I for the development of a cancer therapy.

Ablitech received the Mississippi Seed Fund Research and Development investment in 2009 and in 2010. Managed by the Mississippi Technology Alliance, the Mississippi Seed Fund provides high-tech, start-up companies with access to pre-seed financing, early stage risk capital, and product development capital to stimulate and accelerate the development of high-performance, technology-based business ventures in Mississippi.

In 2011, Ablitech received a $2 million grant from the Department of Defense to develop a siRNA based therapy for heterotopic ossification.

== Research ==
Ablitech's signature product, VersadelTM, is a nucleic acid platform delivery technology that “provides a non-toxic, biocompatible method for the systemic and local delivery of antisense DNA and siRNA in the body.”

== Awards ==
- Invent Your Future, 2006
- National FedEx Technology Business Plan Competition, 2006.
