= Centriworks =

American company

Centriworks (formerly Thermocopy)
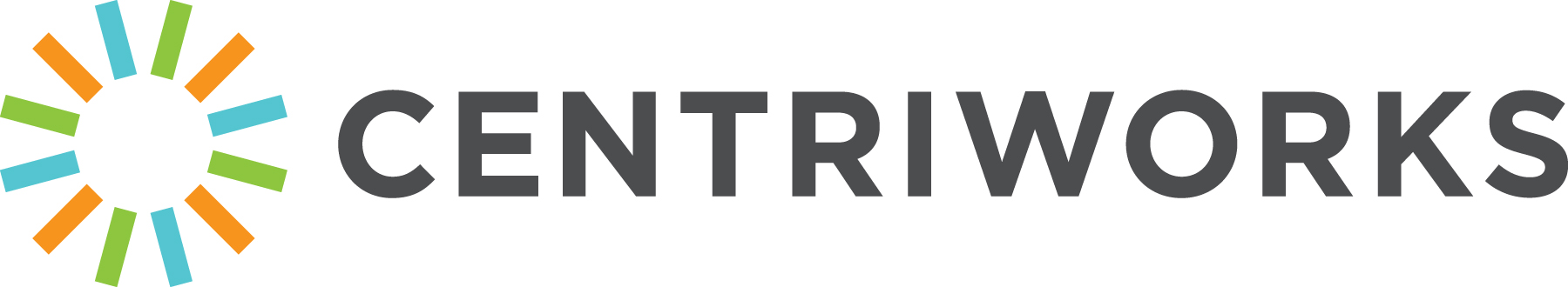

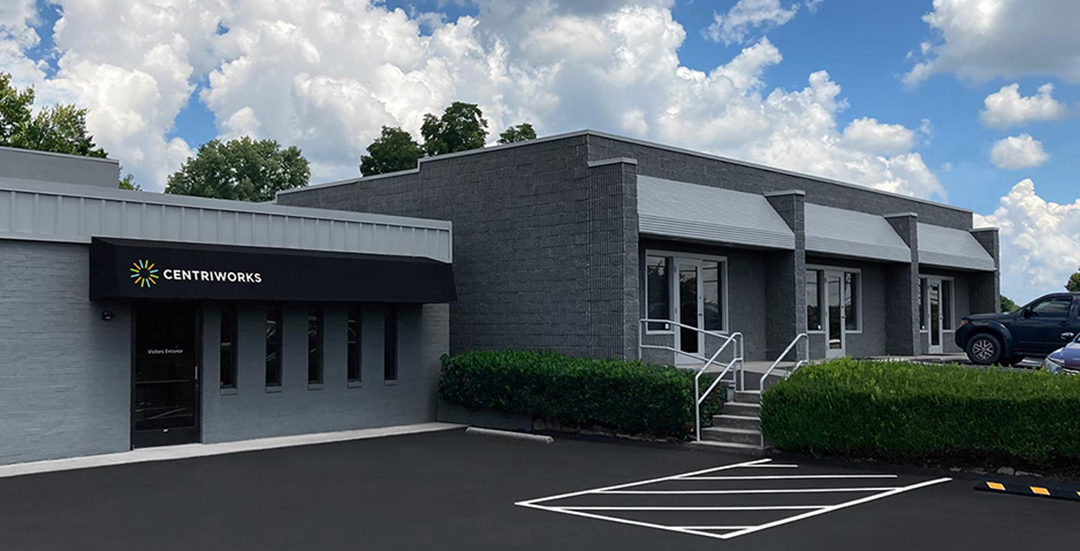
- Headquarters in Knoxville, Tennessee
- Type: Private
- Industry: Business Technology
- Founded: Knoxville, Tennessee, United States (April 1, 1964)
- Number of locations: 2 Locations 3505 Sutherland Avenue; Knoxville, TN 37919 4718 Lake Park Drive, Suite 5 Johnson City, TN 37615
- Area served: East Tennessee and Southwest Virginia
- Key people: Steve Sumner (President); J. Mark DeNicola (CFO, VP of Sales & Marketing)
- Products: IT Services; Cybersecurity; Office Equipment and Supplies; Data Backup Software and Hardware
- Services: Managed Print Services; Document Management Services; Office Equipment Service and Support; Professional Services; Cloud Computing Services; Print Auditing Services; Information Technology Auditing Services
- Number of employees: 70
- Website: Centriworks

CENTRIWORKS (Formerly known as Thermocopy) is the oldest and largest business technology company located in East Tennessee. The Knoxville, Tennessee-based company was founded in the early 1960s as an office equipment dealer, later supplying information technology support, document management consultation, and printer fleet management services.

Centriworks is the only locally based East Tennessee technology company that has earned the CompTIA Security Trustmark+ Certification and the only area provider with a Certified Information Systems Security Professional (CISSP) on their team. The company is one of the major providers of Managed IT Services and cybersecurity for businesses and organizations in East Tennessee across industries.

The company's core office products are multi-functional copiers, printers and fax machines made by Ricoh, and Kyocera. The company supports sustainable business practices, and helped to establish GoGreenET.com, the annual Business In The Green contest, and other environmental initiatives in the community.

ImageSource Magazine named Centriworks its 2006 Dealer of the Year with its national Perfect Image Award.

In March 2010 was designated a Kyocera Certified Managed Print Services Dealer. Centriworks is a vendor neutral managed service provider, with technicians trained to service equipment from many manufacturers.

ENXMagazine has recognized Centriworks as an Elite Dealer since 2016. Elite Dealer awards recognize the office imaging dealer community. Elite Dealers are selected based upon their growth initiatives, innovative marketing programs, outstanding client service, community involvement, vibrant and nurturing workplace culture, and adaptability to ever-changing markets.

== History ==
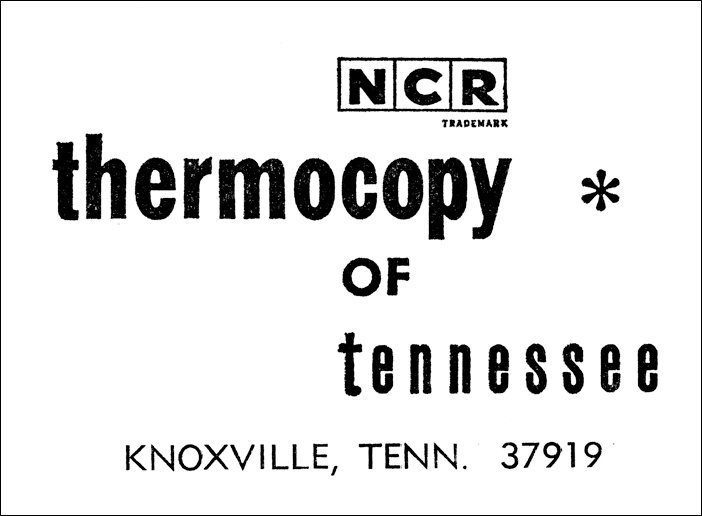
The company's first logo, designed in 1964.

On April 1, 1964, Randall Sumner, with two partners, formed a company to sell office paper with an initial investment of US$150 and a $3,000 note for operating capital. The company began as a dealer for NCR "ThermoCopy" paper. Later that year, they began selling NCR adding machines.

They shifted their focus from paper sales to office equipment as copier use expanded. By the end of the 1970s, the company was the leading local dealer for color copiers, fax machines, and overhead projectors. The company changed locations within the Bearden area of Knoxville several times throughout the 1960s, until moving to their current location at 3505 Sutherland Avenue in 1971.

Centriworks (then Thermocopy) experienced steady growth over the next several decades. In 1995 Steve Sumner purchased the company from its founder, Randall Sumner. In the mid-1990s the company increased its market share, and expanded its operations in 1998 with an office in Johnson City, Tennessee. Thermocopy's Mountain Empire Branch serves the Tri-Cities region of Northeast Tennessee and Southwestern Virginia.

In 2014, Centriworks (then Thermocopy) marked five decades in business with its 50th anniversary celebrations.

In 2019, the company began a rebranding campaign centered around its name change from Thermocopy to Centriworks. The decision to rebrand was deemed necessary in order to have a name that was more forward-looking and better represented the services and products the company had developed over the previous years. The new emphasis on Managed IT Services and Cybersecurity was a major factor in the name change.

In 2024, the company celebrated its 60th anniversary.

== Community involvement ==
Over their many decades in business, Centriworks has supported over 100 civic and non-profit organizations including the Friends of the Smokies, Ronald McDonald House, Friends of ETHRA, The Historic Tennessee Theatre, Boys and Girls Clubs of the Tennessee Valley, CASA of Northeast Tennessee, Wreaths Across America, the Dollywood Foundation, McNabb Center and Covenant Health's Buddy's Race for the Cure. Centriworks is a supporter of the Knoxville-Oak Ridge Innovation Valley.

Centriworks donates a percentage of their total profits directly to their local community. The company also encourages and enables employees to volunteer their extra time and talents to charities and other organizations that need help, further enriching and benefiting those in need. The company has a strong belief in the impact of charity, and how it can affect future generations for the better.

== Environment ==
In 2008 Centriworks was one of ten local businesses certified by the Knoxville Area Chamber Partnership's Green Recognition Program in its inaugural year. The company tracks and publicly reports the results of its environmental initiatives on its Greenworks website. Centriworks is one of the founding partners of GoGreenET.com and co-sponsors the Greater Knoxville Business Journal’s annual Business In The Green contest. Centriworks supports the conservation work of the Fort Loudon Lake Association.

Keep Knoxville Beautiful awarded the "2008 Environmental Achievement Award for Outstanding Achievement By A Large Business" to Centriworks for the company's internal efforts and community involvement. The next year Centriworks received a "Keep Tennessee Beautiful" (the state chapter of Keep America Beautiful) and Tennessee Department of Transportation Award of Excellence for Business.

Centriworks has been named a Platinum Level Recycle Champion by Knox County, Tennessee.

== Training center ==
Centriworks employs an onsite, manufacturer-certified trainer. Ricoh Corporation has consistently recognized Centriworks’ technicians with Ricoh “Prestige” certification and the company's service department with the Ricoh Service Excellence Award. The designation demonstrates knowledge and skill that ranks Centriworks among the top companies in its industry in the United States.
