= Acsis =

American software company

Acsis, Inc.
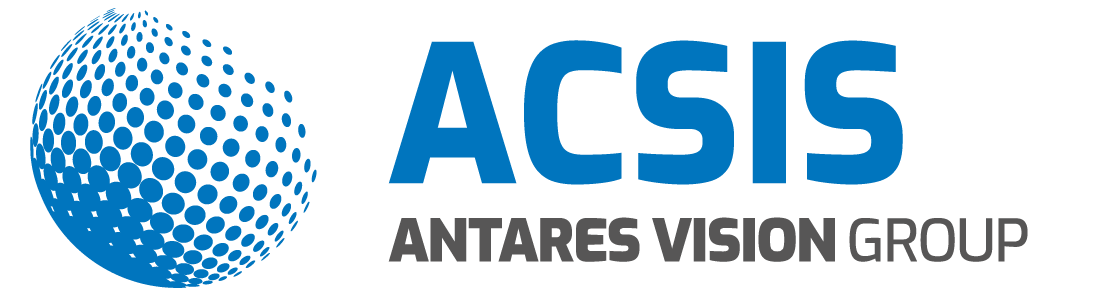
- Type: Private
- Industry: Software
- Founded: 1996
- Headquarters: Marlton, New Jersey, United States
- Area served: Americas, EMEA, Asia-Pacific
- Key people: Marc Friend, Chairman; Jeremy Coote, CEO; John DiPalo, CSO
- Products: Enterprise Software, including: Enterprise Asset Management, Supply Chain Management, Supply Chain Traceability, Supply Chain Visibility
- Owner: Antares Vision Group
- Number of employees: 100 (approximate)
- Website: https://acsisinc.com/

Acsis, Inc. is an American software company that specializes in enterprise software providing end-to-end supply chain traceability. In February 2022 ACSIS was acquired by the Italian company, Antares Vision Group.

== Company overview ==
Headquartered in Marlton, New Jersey, Acsis is a privately held company whose primary shareholder is the private equity firm Saints Capital.

== Company history ==
The company founded in 1996 as a spin-off of ARMS, was created to focus on the market trend in barcode and data collection solutions. Acquired in 2005 by Safeguard Scientifics, Inc., a publicly traded company located in Wayne, Pennsylvania. In 2008, Acsis, Inc. was acquired by Saints Capital.

In February 2022 Acsis was acquired by the Italian company Antares Vision.
