= Meucci Cues =

Meucci Cues is an American manufacturer of pool cues for cue sports, founded in 1975 by Bob Meucci. The company is headquartered in Byhalia, Mississippi and known for its craftmanship in cue manufacturing.

== History ==
Bob Meucci, born in Glenview, Illinois, the son of an industrial engineer, began making cues at age 19 in his father's tool-and-die shop in the Chicago metropolitan area during the early to mid-1960s. At a later stage in his career, Meucci formed a partnership with Horelco Corporation and co-founded BoJim with a colleague named Jim. After the partnership ended, he established Bob Meucci Customs (BMC) in his father’s workshop.

In the mid-1960s, Meucci established his first cue-making company, Bob Meucci Customs (BMC), in Chicago.

On March 24, 1975, Meucci founded his cue company, Meucci Originals, which became the foundation of the company that continues today.

In 1990, the company founded by Bob Meucci as Meucci Originals began using a script “Meucci” logo, marking the transition to the name Meucci Cues.

In 2006, company founder Bob Meucci was honored with induction into the International Cue-makers Hall of Fame for his contribution to cue making and the game of pool.

In 2022, Meucci Cues announced new ownership, with Bob Meucci retiring but staying on as ambassador and designer.

== Role in Billiards ==
According to billiards-industry publications and archival records, various players across different periods of cue sports have been documented in connection with Meucci-manufactured cues. Industry sources identify individuals such as Tyler Styer, LoreeJon Ogonowski-Brown, Mike Massey, and Corey Deuel as being associated with the brand, and earlier records link Jim Rempe, Mike Sigel, Earl Strickland, Buddy Hall, Skyler Woodward, Jayson Shaw, and David Howard to Meucci equipment during stages of their careers.
