= Semitool =

Defunct semiconductor manufacturing company

- Type: Business Unit of Applied Materials (Nasdaq: AMAT)
- Industry: Semiconductor
- Founded: Kalispell, Montana (1979)
- Headquarters: Kalispell, Montana
- Number of employees: 1157 (2007)
- Website: www.semitool.com

Semitool was a semiconductor manufacturing/capital equipment company based in Kalispell, Montana. Raymon Thompson founded the company in California in 1978 and moved it to Montana, where it was officially incorporated in 1979. The company was sold to Applied Materials in December 2009.

== History ==
Semitool was founded in Santa Ana, California, in 1978. Founder Raymon Thompson moved the company to Kipsell, Montana, in 1979, where it was officially incorporated.

The company designed, developed, manufactured high performance and precision chemical processing equipment. Products included electrochemical deposition systems for electroplating copper, gold, solder and other metals; surface preparation systems for cleaning, stripping and etching silicon wafers; and wafer transport container cleaning systems.

In 2009, Semitool was acquired by Applied Materials.
