= Eclat Chocolate =

American artisanal chocolate company

Éclat Chocolate is an artisanal chocolate company founded in West Chester, Pennsylvania in 2005 by Christopher Curtin. They are acknowledged most for their liquid caramels, Peruvian Pure Nacional Truffles and the "Good & Evil" collaboration bar with Anthony Bourdain and Eric Ripert.

== Products ==
The company is most widely known for the "Good & Evil" Bar with Anthony Bourdain and Eric Ripert launched in 2012 after their trip to Peru with Bourdain on CNN’s “Parts Unknown.”

Éclat Chocolate currently offers five different flavors of their liquid caramels truffles: Milk Chocolate with Sea Salt, Dark Chocolate with Sea Salt, Ginger, Pear, and Calvados.

In addition to the more classic flavors, Éclat Chocolate offers flavor combinations such as Green Tea & Roasted Rice and Porcini & Thyme in their Parallel Bars product line. The Parallel bars have been featured in the New York Times and Bon Appetit for their use of dual flavors and chocolates that run parallel to each other within the bar.
