= Wicks n' More =

- Type: Family
- Industry: Candle manufacturing
- Founded: 1998
- Headquarters: 129 Hwy 178 W Tupelo, Mississippi; United States
- Key people: Highland Group Ventures
- Products: Candles
- Website: http://www.wicksnmore.com/

Wicks n' More is a candle manufacturer based in Tupelo, Mississippi, United States. Its specialty is hand-poured pillar candles. Founded in 1998, Wicks n More quickly grew to selling their products in over 3,000 stores in the United States by 2007. The company also sells container candles, gift sets, simmer scents and votive candles.

== History ==
The company was founded in 1998 by Beckey Neal and her daughter, Kim. In 1999, a retail store was opened in Tupelo, Mississippi. The company continues to provide the highest quality handmade pillar candles, wax melts and votive candles. Products are available at retail shops across the country as well as on their company website, www.wicksnmore.com. The factory and outlet store is currently located in Tupelo, Mississippi.

== Unexpected publicity ==
In July 2008, media commentator Rush Limbaugh announced in frustration that he could not find large enough gardenia-scented candles to effectively scent his home. In response, Wicks n' More sent Limbaugh a shipment of large gardenia-scented candles. After Limbaugh mentioned the generosity of Wicks n' More, their internet traffic increased by a factor of ten, and its sales figures increased fivefold.
