= Nascent Republic Records =

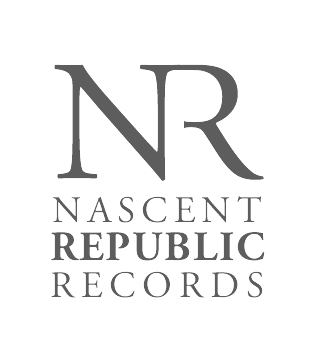
- Founded: 2008
- Founder: Josh Seawell
- Genre: Various
- Country of origin: U.S.
- Official website: www.nascentrepublic.com

Nascent Republic Records is an independent record label founded in 2008 by Josh Seawell, owner of Seawell Studios near Greensboro, North Carolina. The label was formed to give recording freedom to the artists without the pressure of someone telling them they had to sound a certain way. There are four artists on the roster: Joey Barnes (formerly of Daughtry, 2006–2010), Patrick Rock, Stephen von Heyking, and Courtney Smith. Former artist J Timber was signed to the label from 2010 to 2011.

== Discography ==
- Always by Joey Barnes - March 2009
- When All Else Fails... by Patrick Rock- March 2009
- Last Request by Joey Barnes - June 2009
- Change by Joey Barnes - November 2009
- Self-Titled by J Timber- May 2010
- Lips that Taste of Tears by Courtney Smith- November 2010
- Last Christmas by Joey Barnes - December 2010

== Music videos ==
Year	Video	Artist	Director
2010	"My Love"	Courtney Smith	Matt Blair
2010	"Something To Say"	J Timber	Ernie Gilbert
