= The Freaky Bean Coffee Company =

American coffee business

- Company type: Privately held company
- Industry: Restaurants; Retail Coffee and Tea; Retail Beverages; Entertainment
- Founded: October 2005 by Andrew Kessler and Jonathan Stratton
- Defunct: March 2009
- Headquarters: Westbrook, Maine, U.S.
- Area served: Southern Maine
- Key people: Jonathan Stratton, President; Andrew Kessler, V.P. Marketing & E-commerce; Gary Woodworth, V.P. Logistics
- Products: Whole Bean Coffee; Boxed Tea; Made-to-order beverages Bottled beverages Baked Goods; Merchandise
- Website: Freakybean.com

The Freaky Bean Coffee Company was an independent, Maine-based specialty coffee house and roaster. The company was founded in 2005. It had retail locations, a roasting division, and wholesale accounts. It has six locations but faced closures and finally became defunct in March 2009.

== History ==
Andrew Kessler and Jon Stratton, a former member of the US Navy founded the company. They started the company in 2005 using microfinancing from Accion USA. The first Freaky Bean shop opened in June 2006 in Scarborough.

The company experienced rapid growth in 2007 and 2008, followed by store closures. In March 2007, The Freaky Bean was one of 30 companies honored as "outstanding role models of entrepreneurship," by The Maine Small Business Development Center. In July 2007, The Freaky Bean opened its second retail location, as well as its headquarters, roasting operations hub and distribution center on Main Street in Westbrook. In addition to being a coffee roastery and distribution center, this location included a public coffee cupping room. In December 2007, the company announced its agreement to purchase Maine Roasters Coffee Company. This purchase included coffee shops in Yarmouth and Falmouth and Maine Roasters' wholesale business.

In May 2008, The Freaky Bean opened its fifth retail location at the Scarborough Gateway shopping complex. That same month, the company was selected as the Official Coffee of The American Pavilion of the Cannes Film Festival in Cannes, France. As a result of this selection, Freaky Bean would be the only coffee available at the Pavilion. In July 2008, the company opened its sixth retail location on Broadway in South Portland. In November 2008, the former owners of Maine Roasters Coffee took possession of the Maine Roasters assets, including the Yarmouth and Falmouth coffee shops as partial settlement for loan defaults, reducing the number of Freaky Bean locations from six to four. As of December 2008, the members of the board of directors were Jonathan Stratton, Gary Woodworth, Jon Ricci, Jim Walsh, Jim Talbot, Jim Mclaughlin, and Einar Seadler.

In February 2009, the company was forced into filing involuntary Chapter 7 bankruptcy by its three major creditors. Behind the scenes, this process began the forced liquidation of its assets and shutdown of its retail and wholesale operations. In March 2009, the Scarborough Gateway location and the flagship store in Westbrook were abruptly closed amid reports that the company was having trouble paying its vendors and its employees. Some of those vendors took the company to court in an attempt to recover the money owed to them. Later that same month, the remaining two locations — South Portland and Scarborough/Route 1 — were abruptly closed.

== Logo ==
The Freaky Bean's round logo is based on a statue found at the Mayan temples in Central America. Designed by Arielle Walrath, a local Maine designer and illustrator, the stone statue's design was illustrated to show the Mayan character juggling a coffee cup, a coffee bean, and a muffin. A second logo was created for use in smaller spaces: it consists of the company's name, with a coffee cup in the middle with steam emanating from it. Both logos were used interchangeably within the company's stores, literature, and branding.

== Products ==
The Freaky Bean served a variety of coffee-based drinks as well as hot chocolate and organic teas, along with their version of a blended iced coffee drink, the Freakazoid.
