= CTSI-Global =

Memphis-based supply chain management firm

- Formerly: CTSI; Continental Traffic Service, Inc.
- Type: Privately held company
- Industry: Supply Chain Management
- Founded: 1957
- Headquarters: Memphis
- Number of locations: Atlanta, Austin, India, Ireland, Singapore
- Area served: Worldwide
- Key people: J. Kenneth Hazen; President & CEO
- Products: Logistics Management; TMS; Freight Audit and Payment; Business intelligence Consulting
- Website: ctsi-global.com

CTSI-Global is a Memphis-based firm that provides freight-invoice processing and related supply chain management technology and consulting services. CEO J. Kenneth Hazen acquired the company in 1982. Since that time, the firm has evolved from a manual freight bill audit and payment operation into a provider of logistics-focused business intelligence services.

Founded over 60 years ago, the company is a global supply chain services provider with offices in Singapore, Ireland, and India. Its client base includes multinational corporations such as Facebook, Intel, IBM, Horizon Lines and BMW.

== Core Services ==
- Freight payment processing
- Business intelligence
- Transportation Management System (TMS)
- Consulting
- Audit and analysis
- Contract management and cost allocation

== Awards ==
- Top 100 Logistics IT Provider. Inbound Logistics, multiple years
- Top 100 3PL Provider. Inbound Logistics, multiple years
- World's Greatest Logistics IT. How2Media, 2013
- Social Madness national competition. American City Business Journals: Memphis medium business winner, 2012
- Company of the Year. Memphis Business Journal: large business award, 2006; small business award, 1985
- Inc. 500. Inc., 1988

== See also ==
- Electronic Data Interchange
