= Thorlo Inc. =

Family business

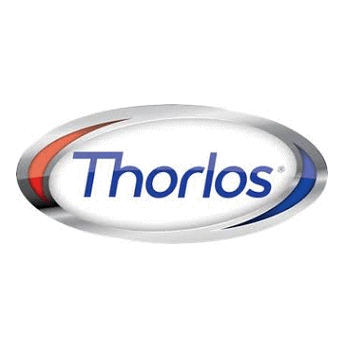
- Company type: Private
- Industry: Knitwear
- Founded: 1980; 45 years ago in Statesville, North Carolina, United States
- Founder: Jim Throneburg
- Products: Padded-socks
- Brands: Thorlos, Experia, Health Padds, Smiles, Medds
- Website: www.thorlo.com

Thorlo Inc. is a family-owned padded-sock manufacturing company based in Statesville, North Carolina. The socks produced by the company commands about 1.1% of the total market of the United States.

== Overview ==
The technology of engineered padded socks was invented by Jim Throneburg in 1953 and he founded Thorlo Inc. in 1980. During the early years of the company they manufactured socks specially for runners. They later started manufacturing socks with cushy heel padding and low-friction fibers for other activities. Since then, the company expanded its production to 32 different types of socks, specifically designed for sports like basketball, tennis and golf; and other activities like the military training and Western boots. The company also has a production line of casual socks, and lighter-weight socks for performance athletes. The company claims to reduce foot pain by 51% based on peer-reviewed clinical research compared to regular cotton socks, that limits both the number and size of sports-related blisters.
