= Herman Born & Sons =

Business located in Baltimore, Maryland that repairs and paints trucks

Herman Born & Sons is an American business located in Baltimore, Maryland, that repairs and paints trucks. Founded on September 20, 1852, the business was identified in 2013 as the ninth-oldest family-owned business in the Baltimore area. In 1999, Herman Born & Sons donated its services to Baltimore County by doing body repair work and painting the outside of a school bus that the county retooled to be a mobile information vehicle for homebound parents.
