= Ohio Falls Iron Works =

Former industrial complex in Indiana

Coordinates: 38.2799°N 85.8268°W

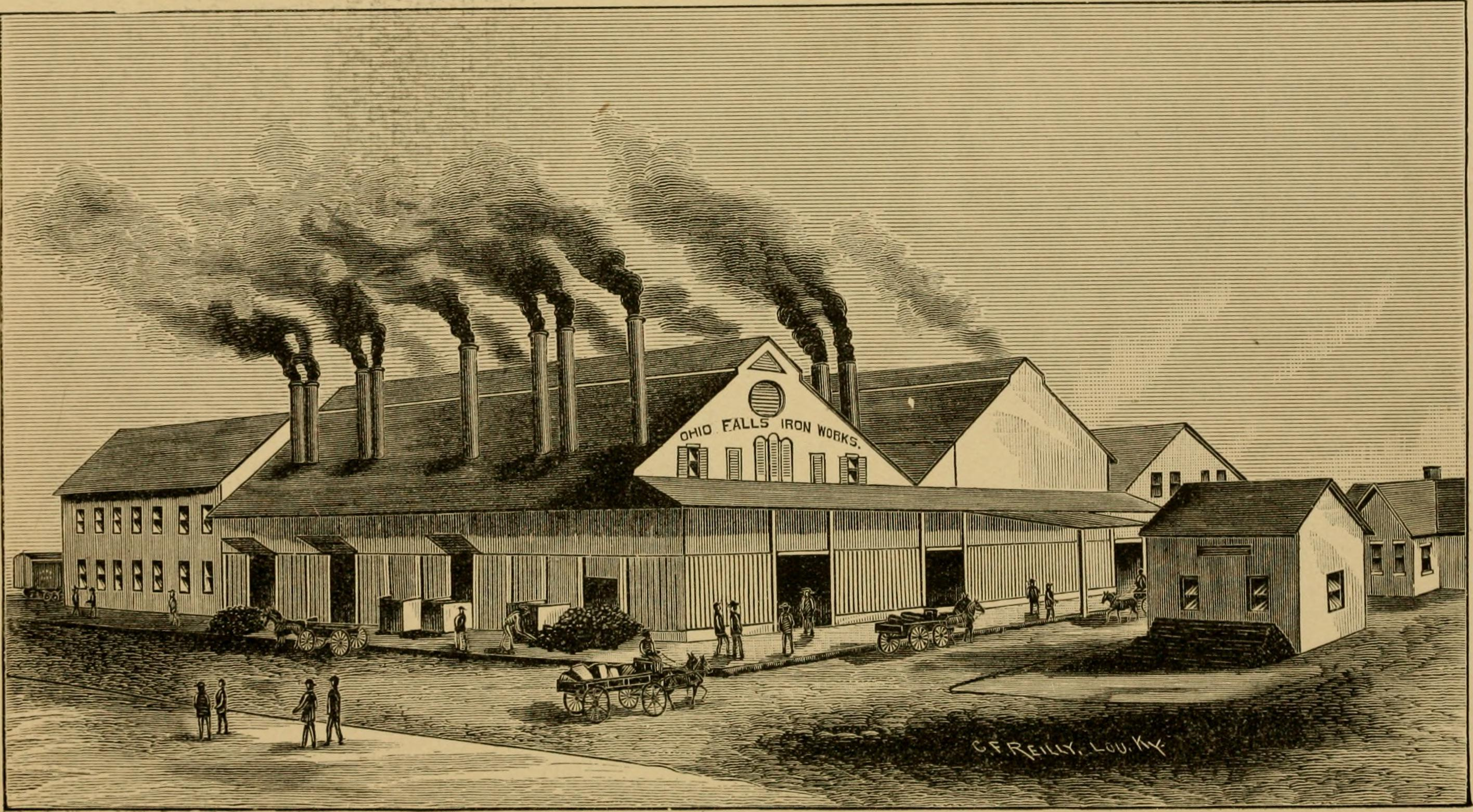
The Ohio Falls Iron Works, 1886

The Ohio Falls Iron Works was an industrial complex on Water Street in New Albany, Indiana. The company manufactured iron bar and bridge iron, locomotives, cars, wagons, plows and other dimension irons.

== History ==
Ohio Falls was founded in 1867 by W. C. DePauw, President; Peter R. Stoy, Vice-President and Treasurer and John McCullough. DePauw had founded the American Plate Glass Works. Stoy operated a hardware house in new Albany. McCullough was a farmer and entrepreneur.

Ohio Falls started with a paid-up capital of $200,000. The works were among the largest in the region, covering 260 x 400 feet of ground, the buildings equipped with steam power and a full complement of machinery. The capacity was 8,000 to 10,000 tons per year of finished goods. About 225 skilled iron-workers and laborers were employed, the payrolls ranging from $1,800 to $2,000 per week.

Ohio Falls sold its products all over North America. In a circular to the trade the company say:

"Established in 1867, we have gone on from year to year adding facility to facility, enabling us to more fully meet the wants of our customers, and now think we can as promptly and satisfactorily fill your valued orders as any iron manufactory in the country." We carry at all seasons from 600 to 1,000 tons manufactured iron, from which to draw in filling hurried orders. Referring you to the past as a guarantee for the future, we respectfully ask a continuance of your patronage."
