= Consonus =

Consonus Technologies, Inc.
- Company type: Private
- Industry: Information technology
- Headquarters: Cary, North Carolina
- Products: Data centers, managed services, IT consulting, and infrastructure

Consonus Technologies, Inc, now called StraTech, provides Information Technology services (data centers, managed services, IT consulting and IT infrastructure services) to businesses in the United States. Consonus' services allow for data back-up and disaster recovery, regulatory compliance, data protection, and virtualization. Consonus also provides hosting, maintenance, technical support and consulting services.

== History ==
Consonus was formed by the merger of Strategic Technologies, Inc. (STI) of Cary, North Carolina, and Consonus of Salt Lake City, Utah, on January 23, 2007.

Strategic Technologies was founded in 1988 as CAD Systems of the Carolinas, a Computer Aided Design and Computer Aided Manufacturing company. It quickly diversified into engineering automation, general system infrastructure design and implementation. In 1991, the company was renamed Strategic Technologies, Inc. and increased its portfolio to include services like training and skills transfer, document and imaging management, system support, network and systems management solutions, and business systems.

Consonus, headquartered in Salt Lake City, was founded by Questar Corporation in 1996 to store, protect and manage business information and systems. In 2005, it was sold to Knox Lawrence International (a private equity firm).

== See also ==
- Colocation centre
- Data center
