= McCabe-Powers Body Company =

Defunct American motor vehicle manufacturer

The McCabe-Powers Body Company was originally founded in St. Louis, Missouri in 1877 by James H. McCabe and Thomas O'Farrell as "James H. McCabe and Thomas O'Farell, Carriage Builders". This eventually became the McCabe-Bierman Wagon Company, and, from 1906 (after Edward J. Powers, Sr. had become a partner), the McCabe-Powers Carriage Company.

First producing horse-drawn wagons, the company later made motor-driven cars, specializing in hearses, passenger limos, delivery vehicles, utility vehicles, and producing military vehicles during World War II. They also produced and serviced hydraulic equipment for utility trucks, such as lift ladders, derricks and diggers, as well as other tools. A service and repair facility in Portland, Oregon maintained the equipment after purchase and the company became the authorized dealer for products of Fairmont Hydraulics, a division of Fairmont Railway Motors, in 1971.

A wagon produced by McCabe-Bierman was used in the 1904 World's Fair, winning a silver medal for design. This wagonette is now on display at the Missouri History Museum in Forest Park, St. Louis.

The company remained in the hands of the Powers family until it was sold in 1983 and no longer produced truck bodies.
