= Struthers-Dunn =

Struthers-Dunn Inc
- Type: Private
- Industry: Industrial Controls
- Founded: 1923
- Headquarters: Timmonsville, SC
- Key people: Eric Steinback, CEO; David Moore, President
- Products: Industrial Relays & Controls
- Number of employees: 36
- Website: http://www.struthers-dunn.com/

Struthers-Dunn Inc, formally known as Struthers-Dunn or Dunco, is a manufacturer of industrial controls since 1923.

Struthers-Dunn was founded by John Struthers-Dunn in 1923 outside Philadelphia, Pennsylvania. They were one of the earliest relay manufacturers in the United States and became the first manufacturer of Military Relays for US Government during World War II. Their first military product, the 101 Series contactor was a 100A rated SPST switch for use on Naval Ships in 1938. Subsequent development led to the beginning of the QPL (Qualified Product List) of products for the US Military, commonly known as MIL-SPEC Products today.

On the Commercial Products side, their other notable design was the 219 Series of Industrial Relays. Originally designed as a socket-compatible, high-reliability relay for use in Nuclear Energy Facilities, it is still used today for critical controls. The 219 packaged family of products, and the 219NE (Nuclear Energy) family, encompassed in addition to the standard electro-mechanical versions - the 236/237/238 family of industrial time-delay relays, the later 246/247/248 family of advanced time-delay relays, the 255 Series of latching relays, the 311 Series of Sequence/stepper relays, the 349 Series Voltage Sensors and the RSX Series of custom packages controls.

== Company history ==
- 1912 - John Struthers Dunn receives his bachelor's degree in mechanical engineering from the University of Pennsylvania and begins working for Westinghouse Electric
- 1923 - Company is founded by John Struthers-Dunn in Philadelphia, PA.
- 1924 - Struthers-Dunn applies for patent US1646888A for SPDT, self-adjusting relay - the first use of many standard features still used in the design of electro-mechanical relays today.
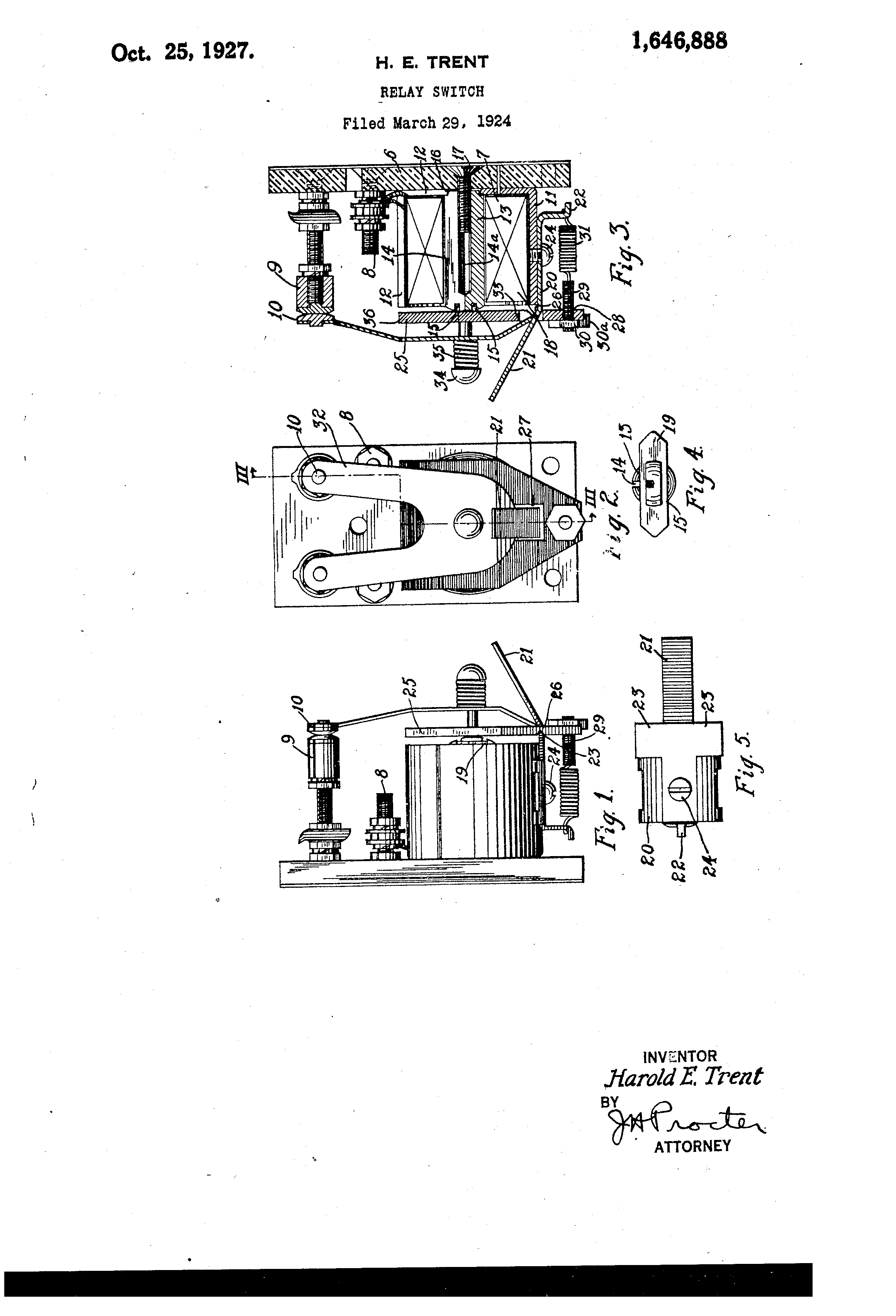
  RELAY SWITCH Filed March 29. 1924 by Struthers-Dunn Inc
- 1925 - Applied for patent US1741409A for Double-Pole Single-throw Normally-Open (DPST-NO) self adjusting relay, the "Grandfather" to the current 450 Series
- 1938 - Introduces the first relay approved for US Military Applications - the 101 Series, used on Naval Vessels.
- 1945 - Charles Packard, Chief Engineer and Struthers-Dunn publishes the 1st Edition of - "Relay engineering: a reference book to guide engineers and others in the selection and use of electromagnetic relays".
- 1947 - Becomes a founding members of NARM, The National Association of Relay Manufacturers.
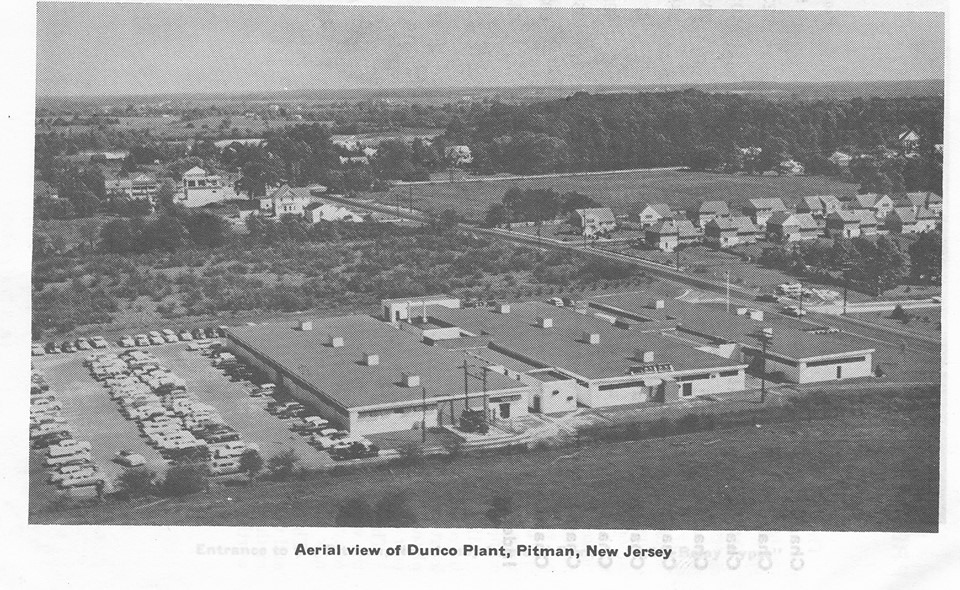
- Struthers-Dunn Plant - Pitman NJ
  1954 - Company moves to new headquarters in Pitman, NJ.
- 1958 - Introduces the 219 and 219NE Series approved for use by the AEC (Atomic Energy Commission) in Nuclear Power Plants.
- 1970 - Introduces the VIP-512 at the Machine Tool Show, one of first Industrial Automation PLCs (Programmable Logic Controller)
- 1972 - Received patent US3660692A - An electronic interval timer employing integrated circuits and providing a high degree of accuracy in timing
- 1986 - Nytronics Corporation purchases Struthers-Dunn and moves commercial lines to South Carolina.
- 1990 - Magnecraft Electric Company (Chicago, IL) purchases the Struthers-Dunn Commercial Product Lines from the Nytronics Corporation, forming MSD Inc
- 1995 - MSD Inc purchases the Military Product Line (MIL-SPEC QPL Products) from the Nytronics Corporation.
- 2003 - MSD sells the Military Product Line to Tyco Electronics for key commercial products in traffic, rail & hazardous environments.
- 2005 - MSD dissolves, selling the Magnecraft Commercial Product Lines to Schneider Electric. and Struthers-Dunn commercial products are sold to Eric Steinback, former Director of Sales of MSD.

On January 1, 2005, Struthers-Dunn returned to its family-run origins as one of a few privately owned relay companies left in the United States.
