= Service Pump & Supply =

- Company type: Private
- Industry: Manufacturing
- Founded: 1980
- Headquarters: Huntington, West Virginia, U.S.
- Area served: Eastern US
- Key people: Patrick J. Farrell (Owner & President)
- Website: www.servicepump.com

Service Pump & Supply is a privately held regional American industrial distributor, enabling customers to transport and efficiently move water. The company provides products and services for the mining, manufacturing, and oil & gas industries, municipal & wastewater authorities, and electrical power generation plants.

== History ==
Service Pump & Supply (SPS) was established January 31, 1980, by Danny and Barbara Vance. In a rented 2500 square ft. building in Barboursville, WV and with a ½ ton pick-up for sales calls and deliveries, the company's objective was to sell Stanco MSHA pumps and service other brands to the coal mines of southern West Virginia and Eastern Kentucky.

In 1986, the company switched from carrying the Stanco brand to carrying Flygt pumps and eventually would grow to be Flygt's largest dewatering distributor worldwide.

In 2008, the company began manufacturing rockdusters that reduce the risk of fire in underground coal mines.

In 2012, amid the economic downturn in the coal market, the company considered moving out of West Virginia. However, the local county development authority, along with then-Governor and current U.S. Senator Joe Manchin, convinced Vance to stay in the Huntington area. Vance, at the time said, "I'd almost made the decision and (the Wayne County Economic Development Authority) made me an offer I couldn't refuse".

Upon his retirement in 2014, Vance sold the business to West Virginia native and United States Air Force veteran Patrick Farrell of Huntington, WV. Farrell is the owner of Savage Grant, a social impact investing firm.

SPS currently has branch locations in West Virginia and Pennsylvania, with its headquarters in Huntington, WV are located in one of the city's three Opportunity Zones. The company's headquarters are in the former American Container Corp building. Built during WW2, the building housed manufacturing operations producing rubber containers used to hold batteries for vehicles, trains, aircraft and submarines, among other things. The company's footprint covers the Appalachian Basin, Illinois Basin and Ohio River Basin.
