= Spring Garden National Bank =

Financial institution in Philadelphia, Pennsylvania, USA

The Spring Garden National Bank was a Philadelphia, Pennsylvania, financial institution that became insolvent on May 7, 1891.

== History ==
On August 26, 1885, the Spring Garden National Bank experienced a bank run precipitated by rumors that it was nearly insolvent. However, the First National Bank paid all the checks drawn on it for presentation at a clearing house (finance).

In 1891, the bank became insolvent. The business was connected to the Keystone Bank which preceded it to failure. The bank's closing coincided with the closure of the Penn Trust and Safe Deposit Company, which was shut down by the national bank examiner, William P. Drew, on the orders of the Comptroller of the Currency. Spring Garden National Bank had $750,000 capital and a $127,500 surplus at the time of its demise, which occurred when it was unable to meet its debt at the clearing house. The following September, the bank president and his brother, F.W. Kennedy and H.H. Kennedy, were sentenced to ten-year prison terms for bank wrecking.
