= Grismer =

Grismer Tire Company
- Industry: Automotive Repair, Tire Sales
- Founded: 1932 (Dayton, Ohio)
- Headquarters: Dayton, Ohio
- Key people: Charles Marshall, John Marshall, Rusty Marshall, Jerry McCormick
- Website: GrimserTire.com

The Grismer Tire Company is a medium-sized automotive repair company. It has six locations in the Columbus, Ohio area, one just north of Cincinnati, Ohio in Fairfield, and the remaining 19 in Dayton. Grismer Tire has been selling Firestone tires since its founding in 1932. It is currently the main dealer of Nokian Tires in the Greater Dayton Area.

== History ==
The Grismer Tire Company was founded by Charles Marshall during the Great Depression in 1932. Marshall was a salesman for Firestone and was interested in forming his own tire sales company. He persuaded a local banker from Indiana to loan him $13,000 in order to buy a small tire business in Dayton, Ohio from a man named Adam Grismer. Later, Marshall was able to convince Firestone to let him pay for the tires after he sold him - during a time when most transactions were cash only.
