= Fort Western Stores =

American company

The Fort
- Type: Private
- Industry: Retail
- Founded: 1972
- Founder: Carl & Shirley Wohlfarth
- Headquarters: Nebraska City, Nebraska, United States
- Number of locations: 5
- Website: www.fortbrands.com

The Fort is a Nebraska-based multi-channel marketer specializing in western lifestyle merchandise including jeans, shirts, cowboy boots, hats, saddles and tack, old west clothing, work wear and home décor.

== History ==
Fort Brands & The Fort Inc is a family-owned, privately held company, established in 1972 by Carl and Shirley Wohlfarth, The enterprise began with their children’s love for horses. When the tack shop the Wohlfarths frequented for years closed, it ignited the idea for them to start their own shop.

The first store opened as a one-room horse tack shop on 48th and Old Cheney Rd. in Lincoln, Nebraska. Carl and Shirley worked part-time in the store while working full-time to support the family, Shirley as a nurse and Carl as a lieutenant in the Lincoln Fire Department. As the business grew, they added jeans and boots to their product offering.

In 1987, Fort Western relocated its Lincoln store from 48th and Old Cheney Rd. to the Alamo center at 56th and Hwy 2 where the tack shop grew from a one-room display to the largest in the Midwest. The Lincoln store now occupies over 40,000 square feet (3,700 m^{2}) of retail space and the product mix has expanded to include western jewelry, outerwear, belts, suits, home décor, collectibles and even furniture… all reflecting the western lifestyle.

The Lincoln store’s two-story floor plan includes an Old West Shop with authentic reproductions of 19th-century historic cowboy clothing and accessories. The lower level houses other specialized areas including a cowboy shop and workwear department. The store’s large selection of merchandise and decor attracts general shoppers as well as western lifestyle enthusiasts. Customers fly in from all over the country to visit the store. In addition, country music legend Garth Brooks has shopped the Fort’s aisles.

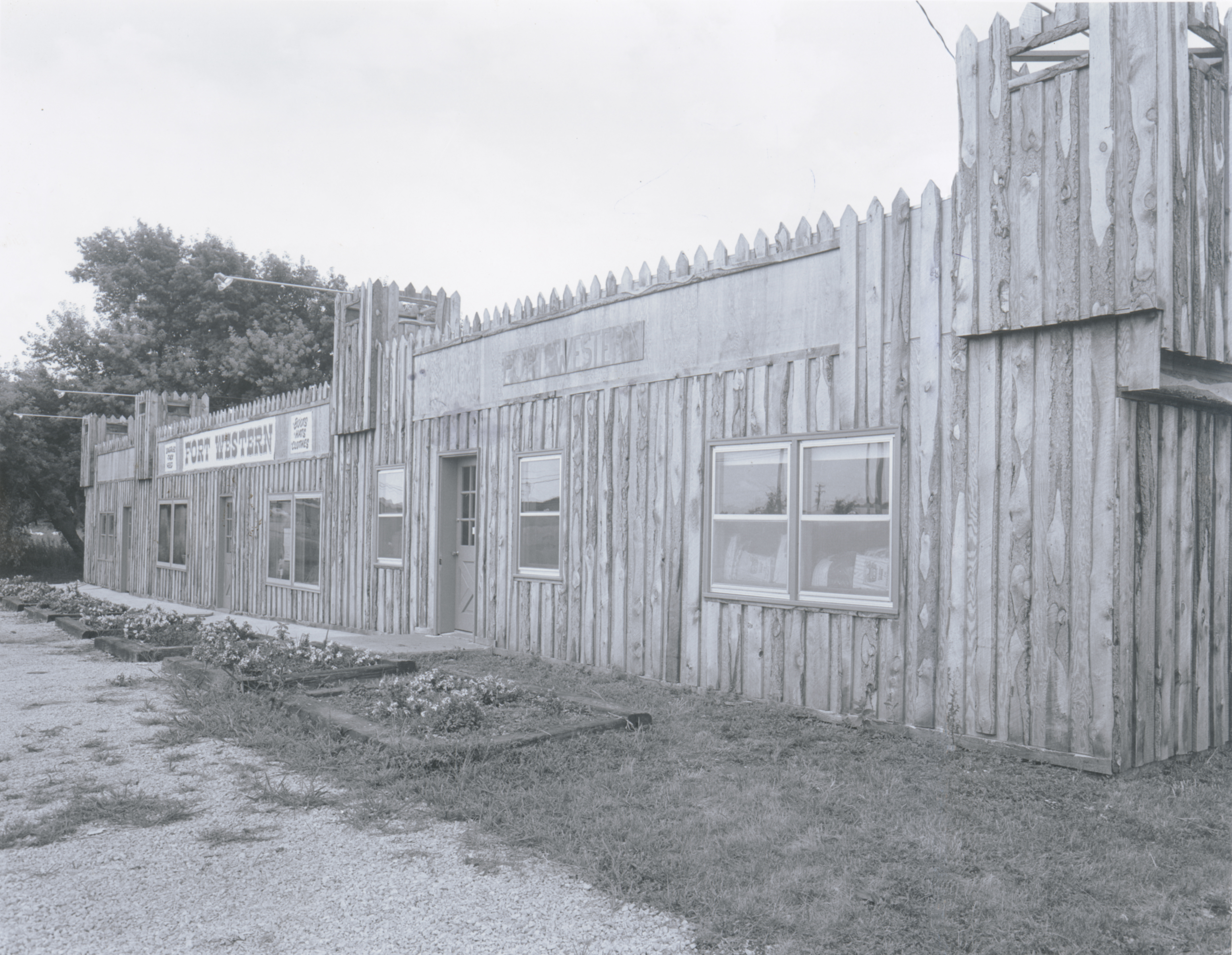
The Original Fort Western Store in Lincoln, NE, 1972-1987

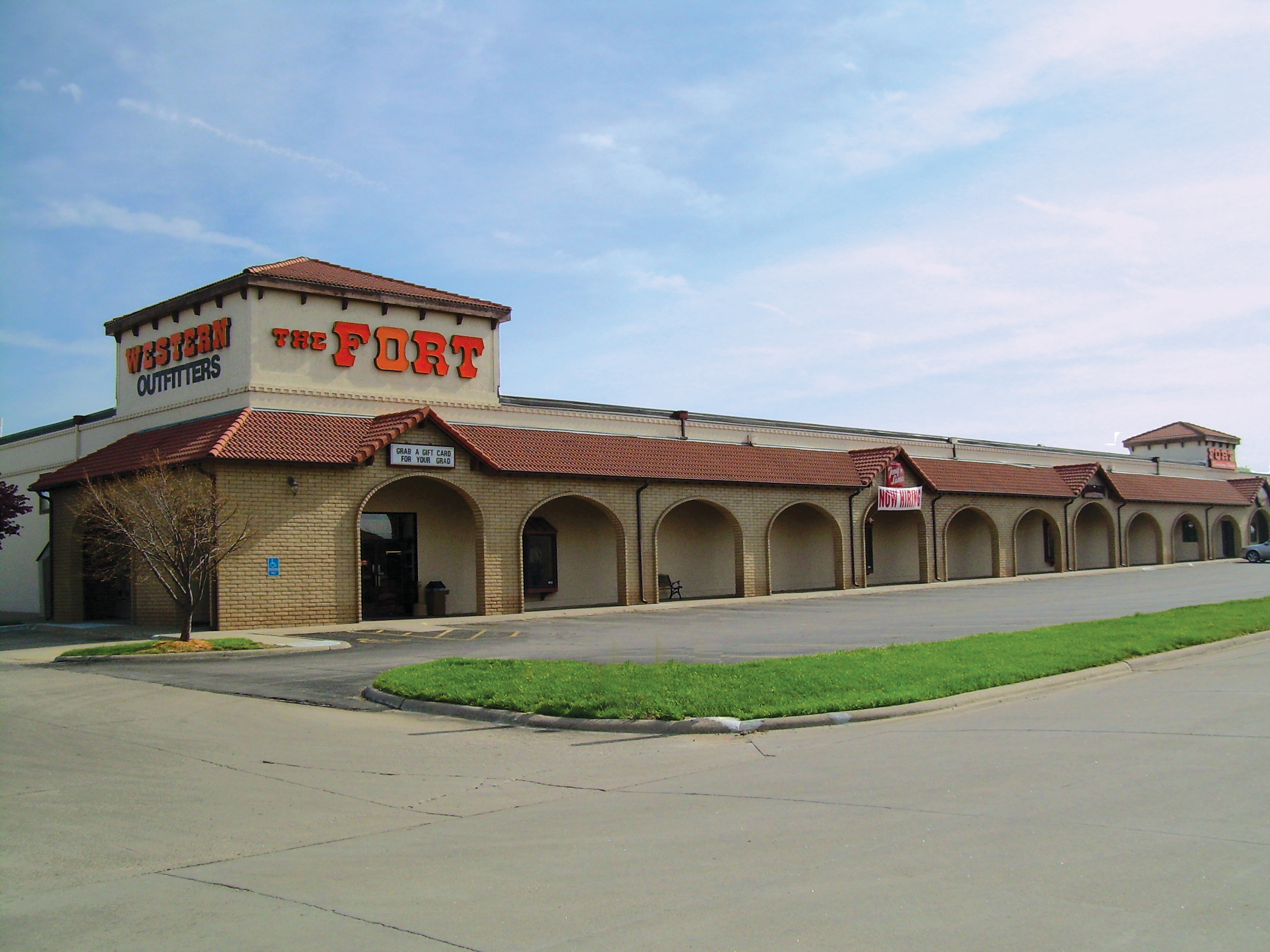
Fort Western Outfitters Store in Lincoln, NE

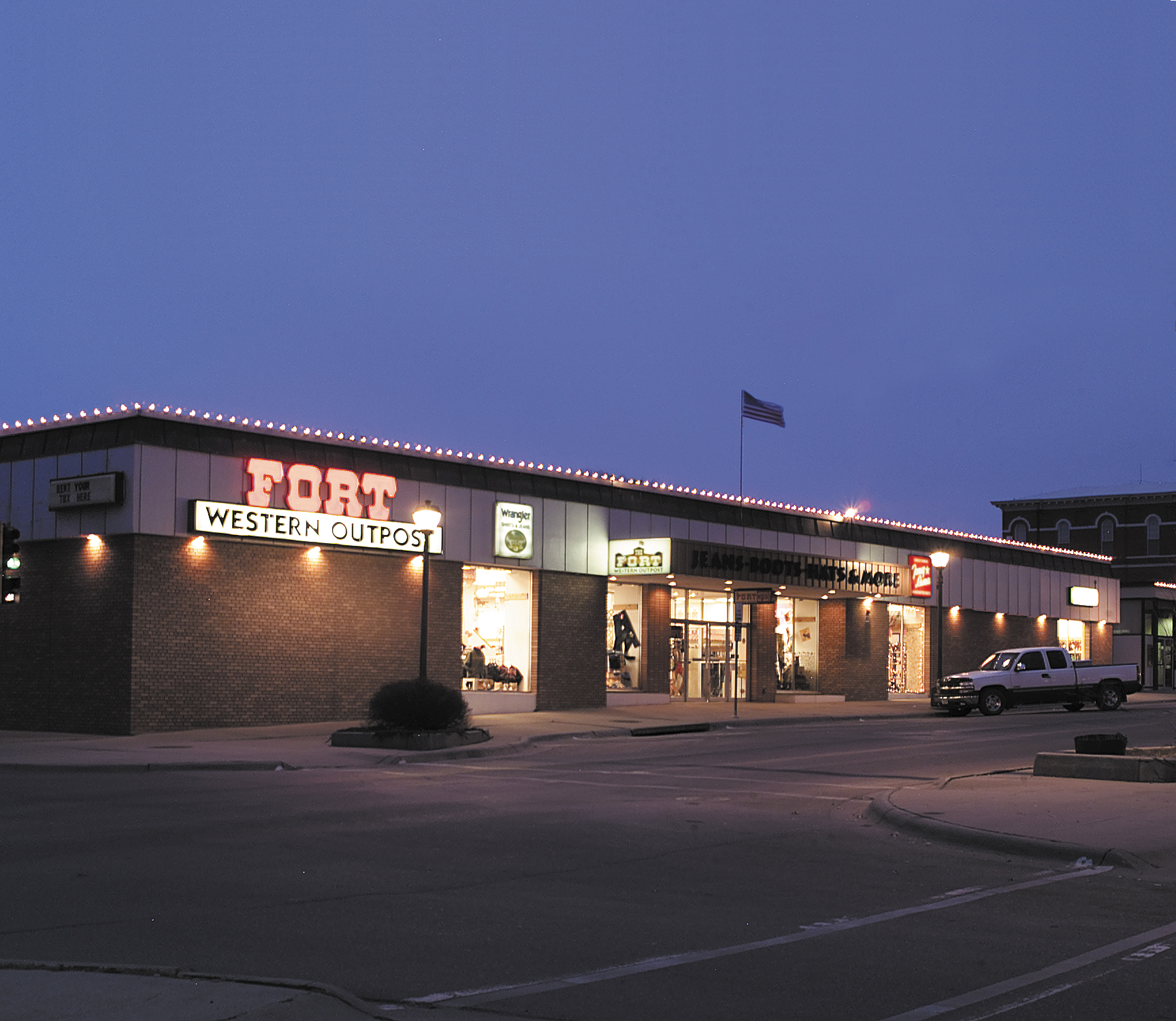
Fort Western Outpost in Nebraska City, NE

Fort Western's “Fort Frontier” brand is attached to shooter and range boots, commonly used in cowboy action shooting, sold in their Old West Shop. The Fort Western used a similar process to design one-of-a-kind custom Nebraska Cornhuskers boots that were custom made and signed by Nebraska Husker coaches. The Husker boots were auctioned off at the 2009 Cattlemen's Ball to raise money for cancer research.

In 1993, Fort Western added a second retail store in Nebraska City, Nebraska. With 16,000 square feet (1,500 m^{2}), the store is the second largest western-style outfitter in Nebraska. Nebraska City is the headquarters for the Fort Western catalog. The catalog publishes several times throughout the year and is distributed to all American states and 12 countries. In 2000, Fort Western took their store online, adding eCommerce to their existing retail and catalog marketing channels. Today the Fort Western is one of the largest western wear outfitters in the Midwest and continues to grow with plans to expand its retail store locations. In July 2012, Fort Western launched a mobile optimized version of their Website. The third Fort Western retail store opened in Columbus, Nebraska in November 2012. At 11,000 square feet (1,022m²) this store is a sizable addition to the Fort Western family.
