= State Line Tack =

American equine pet supplies and tack store

- Type: Division
- Founded: 1980; 46 years ago in Plaistow, New Hampshire
- Parent: Sporting Dog Specialties; PetSmart, Inc. (1996–2007); Pets United (from 2007)
- Website: Official website

State Line Tack, a division of TABcom, LLC, is an equine products and supplies retailer. Beginning as a single outlet in Plaistow, New Hampshire in 1980, on the state line between New Hampshire and Massachusetts, State Line Tack converted an old barn into a 4 story retail tack store, with saddles sold on the 4th floor, grooming supplies, bridles, blankets on the 3rd story, clothing and boots on the first story, and clearance and stable supplies in the basement. At that time, it offered the largest selection of horse supplies in a single location nationwide, and offered more reasonably priced lines of inventory than most of its competitors. State line also ean a small kennel. It grew into a direct mail catalog retailer within a few years after being purchased by mail order pet supply giant Sporting Dog Specialties. In 1996, PetSmart, Inc. acquired Sporting Dog Specialties and its subsidiary State Line Tack for $45 million mostly paid in company stock, and opened more than 160 full-size (about 3,000 square feet) equine departments inside PetSmart stores. The Plaistow store moved to Salem, New Hampshire, expanding to over 10,000 square feet (930 m^{2}).

In 2007, PetSmart sold State Line Tack, including the brand name, inventory, customer lists, and other assets, to Pets United (now known as TABCom, LLC) for an undisclosed amount. PetSmart closed all stores and the Fulfillment Center in Brockport, New York. Under TABcom, State Line Tack continues to operate as an online retailer.
