= Applied Instruments =

Applied Instruments, Inc.
- Applied Instruments logo
- Company type: Private
- Industry: Telecommunications
- Founded: 1986
- Headquarters: Indianapolis, Indiana
- Products: Broadband Noise Generators, Noise Power Ratio Test Sets, Satellite Signal Level Meters, RF Carrier Generators, and RF Switches
- Revenue: <$10 Million USD (2011)
- Number of employees: <500 (2011)
- Website: www.appliedin.com

Applied Instruments, Inc. is a manufacturer of RF test and measurement equipment for the telecommunications industry. The company is headquartered in Indianapolis, Indiana. It was founded in 1986.

Applied Instruments, Inc. began operations in 1986 to meet the requirements of cable television operators who needed specific equipment to ensure the integrity of their new or existing systems.

Products include:

- Satellite Signal Level Meters
- Broadband Noise Generators
- Multi-Carrier RF Signal Generators
- RF Signal Monitors and Switch Controllers
- Return Band Alignment System
- Noise Power Ratio Test Sets
- Calibrators

== Industry Associations ==
- SCTE - Society of Cable Telecommunications Engineers
- SBCA - Satellite Broadcasting and Communications Association
- NTCA - National Telecommunications Cooperative Association
