= Shearline Boatworks =

Boat manufacturer based in Morehead City, North Carolina

Shearline Boatworks is a Morehead City, North Carolina–based boat manufacturer. The computer designed boats are built around a wooden core using epoxy and cloth. The custom center-console boats are computer design and made by hand. The company is owned by Mason Cox III and Chip King. The boats style is referred to as Carolina.
