= PooPrints =

American DNA profiling company

- Company type: Distributorship
- Industry: DNA Identification of dog waste; Environmental
- Founded: 2008; 18 years ago in Knoxville, Tennessee, USA
- Founder: Tom Boyd
- Headquarters: Locations across the USA
- Number of locations: 30
- Area served: United States, Canada, UK, Israel
- Key people: Tom Boyd, Meg Retinger, Win Chandler,
- Products: Pet Waste Station, Bag Refills, Individual Resident Scoop Bag dispensers,
- Services: DNA World Pet Registry Database, Dog DNA Waste Matching, Proof of Parentage
- Owner: Tom Boyd
- Website: www.pooprints.com

PooPrints is a commercial service that uses DNA profiling of feces to assist with pet waste management. DNA is first collected by a cheek swab, and registered online at the DNA World Pet Registry.

According to a 2012 report from Minnesota station WCCO-TV, it is "a first of its kind company". It is a division of BioPet Laboratories, located in Knoxville, Tennessee. It was started in 2008.
