= Pizza Cheeks =

Pizzeria in Sioux Falls, South Dakota

- Interactive map of Pizza Cheeks

Restaurant information
- Established: December 2020; 5 years ago
- Owners: Jordan Paul Taylor; Barry Putzke
- Food type: Pizza
- Location: 120 S Phillips Ave, Sioux Falls, South Dakota, 57104, United States
- Coordinates: 43.546529989100584°N 96.72632265644036°W
- Website: www.mypizzacheeks.com

Pizza Cheeks is a family-friendly pizzeria located in Sioux Falls and is owned by Jordan Paul Taylor and Barry Putzke.

== History ==
Pizza Cheeks opened for business in late November 2020 as a pizzeria operating inside The Hello Hi Bar in downtown Sioux Falls. The pizzeria makes pizza to order, letting the dough ferment for 2 days, as well as selling individual slices of "mainstays" such as veggie and pepperoni.

In 2025, the business expanded and opened a standalone full-service location on South Minnesota Avenue.

Pizza Cheeks primarily serves made-to-order pizzas, available as whole pies or by the slice. The menu also includes additional Italian-influenced dishes such as pasta, sandwiches, and salads, which were introduced with the opening of the standalone location in 2025.
