= Porter Lyons =

American jewelry and lifestyle brand

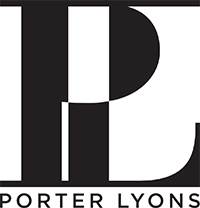
- Founded: March 2012
- Founder: Ashley Porter
- Headquarters: 623 Royal Street, New Orleans, Louisiana 70130, New Orleans, United States
- Services: Fine Jewelry, Luxury Piercings, and Lifestyle Products
- Website: www.porterlyons.com

Porter Lyons is a jewelry and lifestyle brand created by Ashley Porter. The line debuted in November 2012 in New Orleans, Louisiana. The line has been worn by many celebrities, such as Taylor Swift, Jessica Alba, Jennifer Lawrence and Cameron Diaz and has been featured in Elle and W Magazine.

== Background ==
Porter Lyons is an American luxury jewelry and lifestyle brand founded by Ashley Ann Lyons Porter in 2012. Drawing inspiration from the family's origins in New Orleans dating back to 1860, when they had a pharmacy, IL Lyons.

Initially, Lyons derived her signature style from Native American belief of using every part of an animal and began to experiment with casting alligator teeth and bones in brass, resulting in Backbone, the brand's first jewelry collection. By 2016, the brand expanded to become a global fine jewelry and lifestyle company. In 2022, Porter Lyons relocated their design house and flagship store to the iconic Royal Street in New Orleans.

== Inspiration ==
Porter Lyons draws inspiration from the founder's family history, as well as New Orleans culture and traditions. Each collection focuses on a subculture and uses materials that reference the concept through locally sourced materials. Porter has said that her mission is to "preserve culture through design."

== Philanthropy ==
In the Backbone collection, Porter Lyons focused its efforts on Louisiana by donating 5% of all profits to the Coalition to Restore Coastal Louisiana.

Porter Lyons' campaign, "Light Up for Literacy", donates 50% of custom earring sales to Louisiana Endowment for Humanities. The campaign launched in September 2014.

With the launch of "Deco Bohemia" in October 2015, Porter Lyons partnered with the George Rodrigue Foundation of the Arts to support children's art programs around Louisiana.

"I plan to turn Porter Lyons into a lifestyle brand", said Porter on MarthaStewart.com, "staying true to my mission of aiding different relief efforts based on which culture the item is inspired by."
