= First Friday's Group =

American entertainment and ed-tech company

First Friday's Group (1FG) is an American entertainment and ed-tech company headquartered in Baltimore, Maryland.

The company provides free educational courses in the arts (DJing, Photography, Videography) to residents and youth from underprivileged backgrounds in urban areas in the United States. The company then organizes festivals and live events at which individuals trained by the company's educational platform are invited to perform. First Friday's Group's educational platform received investments from The Johns Hopkins University and Red Bull.

The company was founded in 2018 by American entrepreneurs Kristofer Madu and Sindhu Banerjee while they were students at Johns Hopkins. As of 2023, the company operates subsidiaries in Nashville, Tennessee and Boston, Massachusetts.
