= Reeds Jewelers =

Retail jewelry company

Reeds Jewelers, Inc.
- Company type: Private
- Industry: Retailing; Jewelers
- Founded: 1946 (Wilmington, North Carolina)
- Headquarters: Wilmington, North Carolina
- Key people: Alan M. Zimmer, President; Bill Reinger, CFO; Judy Fisher, SVP of Merchandising
- Products: Diamonds; Jewelry; Watches; Swarovski Crystal; Gifts and Accessories
- Website: www.reeds.com

Reeds Jewelers is a U.S. retail jewelry company founded in 1946 by Bill and Roberta Zimmer in Wilmington, North Carolina. Reeds Jewelers sells diamonds and precious gems, fine jewelry, brand-name watches, Pandora charms, Swarovski crystal, and jewelry accessories in its chain of retail stores primarily located in shopping malls and its online store Reeds.com. In May 2008, "National Jeweler" magazine listed Reeds Jewelers as the ninth largest North American Retail Jewelry chain.

== History ==
The company started in 1946 when Bill Zimmer and his wife, Roberta, bought a small downtown jewelry store in Wilmington, North Carolina and changed the name to Reeds Jewelers. Later, Reeds opened a store in Whiteville, Jacksonville, and other cities in both North and South Carolina. Bill Zimmer built Reeds' business on the foundation of customer service and respect, which he deemed the Reeds Promise. He would often tell his associates: "The most important thing I've learned is that you never argue with a customer. You've just got to do right by people." He carried that philosophy into his treatment of employees, vendors and customers alike, stating that his priorities were to "treat all my people like I'd want to be treated, I respect them and I let them know they were loved and appreciated." By 1979, Reeds Jewelers maintained two dozen retail outlets. Alan Zimmer joined Reeds Jewelers as executive vice president in 1981 and took charge of merchandising. He officially became president and CEO in 1985.

In December 1986 Reeds Jewelers held its initial public offering on The NASDAQ Stock Market, trading under the symbol REEDS. Over the next decade Reeds acquired Dreifus Jewelry Company of Memphis, a nineteen store chain in the Southeast and Midwest, and Gray's Jewelers, Inc., a five store chain based in Tulsa, Oklahoma. In 1995 Reeds Jewelers purchased Melart Jewelers, a mid-Atlantic based jeweler operating stores in Maryland, DC, and Pennsylvania. In 1998 Reeds Jewelers moved to the American Stock Exchange and traded using the symbol RJI.

In February 2004 the company returned to private ownership by the Zimmer family, making it one of the largest family owned jeweler in America. In 2014, Reeds announced the acceptance of Bitcoin, a digital currency, in-store and online at reeds.com. Reeds Jewelers is the first fine jeweler to accept bitcoin.

== Products ==
Reeds provides a wide variety of both gold and non-gold jewelry. Popular brands and designers include: David Yurman, John Hardy, Roberto Coin, Gucci, EFFY, Le Vian, Forevermark, MIKIMOTO, Montblanc, Pandora, and Swarovski. REEDS also carries an extensive collection of designer watches including: Rolex, Breitling, Omega, Tudor, Grand Seiko, Tag Heuer, Tissot, Movado, Montblanc, NORQAIN, Oris, Citizen Eco-Drive, and Bulova to name a few.

In August 2015, REEDS collaborated with LG Electronics to design and introduce the first luxury Android smartwatch, the LG Watch Urbane Luxe. Features include a body made of 23-karat gold heavy plate, a handmade Alligator wrist strap with deployment clasp, and a piano-gloss watch case.

== Store Locations ==
Reeds Jewelers store

As of July 2014, Reeds Jewelers operates 64 retail stores in shopping malls and life-style shopping centers in 13 states: Alabama, Florida, Georgia, Kentucky, Maryland, Mississippi, North Carolina, Pennsylvania, South Carolina, Tennessee, Texas, Virginia, and West Virginia. (An unrelated Reeds Jewelers also has several locations in New York state, as of May 2017. )
