= MTI-GlobalStem =

Company in Rockville, Maryland, US

Coordinates: 39.141400°N 77.210007°W

- Company type: Private
- Industry: Biotechnology
- Founded: 2006; 20 years ago
- Headquarters: Gaithersburg, Maryland, U.S.
- Key people: Jonathan Auerbach
- Number of employees: 6 (2006)

MTI-GlobalStem (formerly known as GlobalStem), Inc. is a biotechnology company based in Rockville, Maryland.

GlobalStem is a provider of laboratory products and services for the stem cell research community. The company is based in Rockville, Maryland and serves an international base of academic, private industry and government customers. The company was founded in 2006 by a team of stem cell researchers who desired to bring to market better quality and more standardized research tools.

Globalstem, Inc. was acquired by Molecular Transfer, Inc. in 2009. In 2015, the newly organized company was rebranded as MTI-GlobalStem.

MTI-GlobalStem was subsequently acquired by Thermo Fisher Scientific in late 2016.

== Products ==
1. Fully characterized Stem cells
2. ES-qualified Mouse Feeder Cells and Human Feeder Cells
3. Proprietary growth media for ES culture
4. ES-qualified Fetal Bovine Serum and Medium Supplements
5. iPSC- human induced pluripotent stem cells and culture reagents
6. Transfection and Protein production Tools
7. Characterization services
