= Triton Systems =

ATM manufacturer

Triton Systems LLC is a manufacturer of automated teller machines (ATMs). Triton ATMs are built in Long Beach, Mississippi. Triton has been in business since 1979, and has nearly 200,000 installations in over 24 countries.

== History ==
Founded in 1979 by Ernest L. Burdette, Frank J. Wilem, Jr., and Robert E. Sandoz, Triton Systems developed ATMjr, the world's first battery-powered and completely portable device for training bank customers to use what was, at the time, a fairly new banking service, the ATM. Triton followed this product with the development of a Card Activation System that allowed financial institutions to instantly issue ATM cards with customized (often customer chosen) personal identification numbers (PINs).

In the early 1990s, Triton pioneered in-store cash withdrawals with the introduction of the Scrip terminal, a machine that allows a store's customers to use an ATM card to generate a voucher, redeemable for cash at the register.

In 2000 Triton was acquired by Dover Corporation (NYSE-traded DOV), a manufacturer of components for industrial and commercial use. In 2004, Fujitsu and Triton entered into a strategic licensing agreement to provide Fujitsu's Windows-based Prism software on Triton ATMs. Later that same year, Triton launched the RT2000, a smaller, low-cost through-the-wall ATM. 120,000 ATMs were shipped to 17 countries around the world.

In 2005 Hurricane Katrina provided a major challenge for Triton. Its headquarters and manufacturing plant on the Mississippi Gulf coast was shut down, and the entire coastal area evacuated. Triton's Long Beach, Mississippi administrative, manufacturing and production facilities were back on-line within two weeks.

Triton opened a Memphis manufacturing and service facility in July 2006. In 2008 Triton launched the RL2000, a stand-alone ATM. Also that year, Triton's subsidiary, Calypso, began operations in Australia. On April 14, 2008, Calypso conducted the largest migration of ATMs to be completed in a single day — 2,808 ATMs.

In March 2009, Triton introduced the RL1600, a new off-premises ATM. Also in March 2009, Triton made the decision to sell its Calypso processing operation in order to focus on ATM manufacturing, software development and support.

In September 2009, the company launched ATMGurus. ATMGurus provides parts, repair and training support for ATMs.

In July 2008, Nautilus Hyosung offered to acquire Triton from its parent company Dover Corporation for $63 million U.S. Dollars. However, in May 2009, citing anti-trust scrutiny from regulators, the acquisition was cancelled. Subsequently, in March 2010, Dover completed the sale of Triton to a group of private investors. The company is currently privately held.

== ATMGurus ==
ATMGurus is a division of Triton Systems of Delaware Inc. and provides parts, repair, and training for a variety of retail ATM brands.

== Memberships ==
Triton has active membership in the following industry associations:

- ATM Industry Association (ATMIA)
- NAAIO (National Association of ATM ISOs and Operators)
- FSPA (Financial and Security Products Association)
- ICBA (Independent Community Banking Association)
