= Mistral Group =

The Mistral Group is an informal group of independent separate companies, Mistral Inc., Mistral Security Inc., Mistral Detection Ltd., Karil International Marketing Ltd., and Karil Protective Systems Ltd., with units covering industrial and defense; security, law enforcement and public safety; and international marketing. The "Group" cooperates in the marketing of Defense and Law Enforcement products globally. In June 2007, it received widespread media attention for a pilot program to introduce aerosol drug testing into public schools, beginning in Rockingham County, North Carolina.

== Aerosol drug testing ==
The tests marketed by the company are based on chemical reactions with specialized reagents and have been used for years for field testing by law enforcement. Some of the tests have been modified to increase reagent stability (i.e. shelf life), reduce false positives, or to eliminate hydrochloric acid; thus they are marketed as non-toxic and non-carcinogenic. Tests are made by spraying directly on surfaces or by swabbing surfaces and spraying the swabs, and take thirty seconds or less to read. The tests are marketed as sensitive to less than ten micrograms of the target drug.

The tests available are:

Test	Reagent	Detects
Cannabispray	Fast Blue BB (salt)	marijuana/hashish
Coca-Test	Cobalt Thiocyanate (Scott)	cocaine/crack
Herosol		heroin and some designer heroin-related drugs
Meth-Test	Simon	methamphetamine and related drugs.
Barbitu-Sol		

A combination of tests for cannabis, opiates, and amphetamines is sold as Detect4Drugs, which turns one of four colors depending on which substance is present. Some media reports have ascribed somewhat greater sensitivity to the tests, claiming detection of morphine, codeine, and MDMA, and a detection threshold of one microgram.

== Aerosol testing in schools ==
The school testing program was funded by the National Institute of Justice (NIJ) under a directive from Congress to find a safe test to detect trace amounts of illegal drugs in and beyond school environments. [Senate Report 106-404, p. 61, September 8, 2000] The program is described as emphasizing non-intrusive environmental applications of the technology, such as daily testing of doorknobs to determine what drugs are most prevalent. However, a local news report emphasized that the testing can be done on students' personal items, such as like book bags, pencils, door handles, keys or cell phones, and that when evidence of criminal activity is found the school is legally required to inform police. Nonetheless, initial positive results are not taken seriously, because false positives can result from chemical cross-reactivity, second-hand contact such as a handshake with someone who has handled a drug, or lingering environmental contamination. The threshold for action may involve third or fourth positive test results or positive tests following prior negative tests, as well as the quantity of drug detected.
