= Paige's Music =

American musical instrument retailer

W. H. Paige and Company
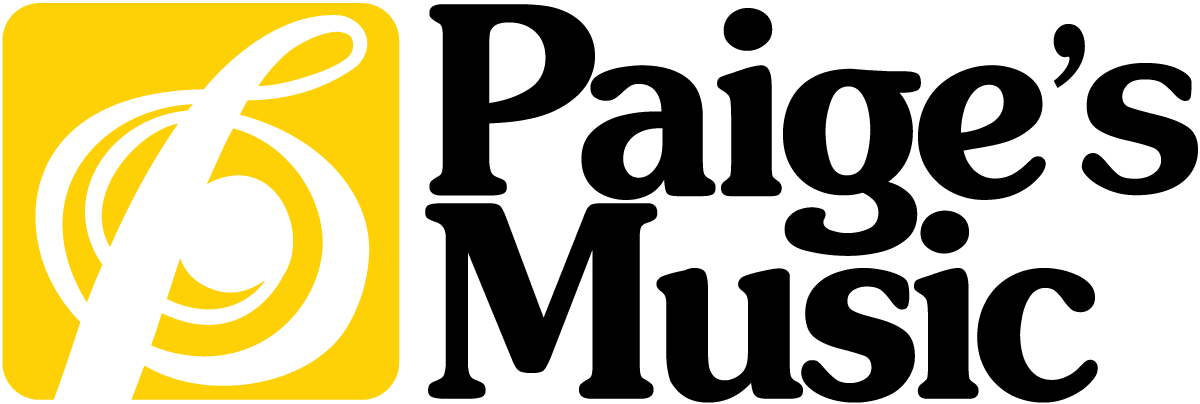
- Type: Private
- Industry: Retailing
- Founded: 1871; 155 years ago in Terre Haute, Indiana, U.S.
- Headquarters: Fishers, Indiana, U.S.
- Number of locations: 2 (2026)
- Products: String instrument, woodwind instrument, brass instrument, percussion instrument, marching instrument, music accessories
- Website: www.paigesmusic.com

W. H. Paige and Company is a music instrument retailer based in Indianapolis, Indiana. The company was founded in 1871 in Terre Haute, Indiana, by William H. Paige, a vocal music teacher, and W. B. Warton, a real estate agent. The company sold a variety of musical instruments, books, and phonographs. William Paige died in 1901, and the company was then operated by his sons Warner and Frederick.

By 1977, the company was run by Warner Paige III, who opened a second location in Indianapolis. The Terre Haute location was later closed, as was a satellite store in Kokomo, Indiana. In 1999, Mark Goff, who had joined the company in 1985, purchased the company.

The company now focuses primarily on band and orchestra instruments for schools. The company is listed in the "Top 200 Music Stores Ranked by Sales" by The Music Trades.
