= BlueHippo Funding =

Defunct American installment credit company

BlueHippo Funding, LLC
- The BlueHippo logo, a cartoon hippopotamus
- Industry: Financial services
- Founder: Joseph Rensin
- Products: Personal computers; Flat-screen televisions; Electronics
- Services: Installment credit

BlueHippo Funding, LLC was an installment credit company operating in the United States founded by Joseph Rensin that claimed to offer personal computers, flat-screen televisions and other high-tech items for sale to customers with poor credit. In an article published November 25, 2009 titled BlueHippo files for bankruptcy: Company blames its bank; was accused of violating settlement with FTC, Eileen Ambrose reported that the company "was forced to file for protection under Chapter 11." On Wednesday December 9, 2009, the company filed for Chapter 7 bankruptcy after having its funds frozen by their payment processor. A petition to a Delaware bankruptcy judge to release the funds was denied. The company's advertised toll-free phone number and website are no longer functioning.

The company encountered several complaints with the Better Business Bureau; the Greater Maryland Better Business Bureau issued a consumer alert against the company within eight months of its founding. BlueHippo's main product was a personal computer system. Its radio commercials stated that a customer must build a "short credit history" to qualify. The payment was made through an installment plan.

The company had been investigated several times for consumer fraud. In April 2008, BlueHippo settled with the Federal Trade Commission to reimburse defrauded customers up to $5 million. However, on November 12, 2009, the FTC filed a memorandum in federal court reporting that despite collecting more than $15 million from customers since the April 2008 settlement, BlueHippo shipped "at most a single computer" before the FTC resumed legal action in April 2009. Blue Hippo was repeatedly fined by the court for failure to file the FTC reports it had agreed to file as part of the agency's oversight. On November 13, 2009, Ars Technica reported, "The FTC has had it, and today went back to court asking a federal judge for a contempt order against BlueHippo."

== Criticisms and investigations ==
The Federal Trade Commission (FTC) received 8,000 pages of complaints and launched an investigation of the company. In February 2008 the FTC settled its grievances with BlueHippo and required the company to pay up to $5,000,000 to settle the FTC's charges. In April 2009, a federal court found BlueHippo in contempt for not issuing reports to the FTC as required by the settlement.

The Maryland Attorney General reached a settlement with Blue Hippo in 2007. Under the terms of the settlement, the company agreed to pay restitution to consumers who overpaid or did not receive their goods.

Bill McCollum, Florida Attorney General said, "We think that overall, this is a very deceptive trade practice."

The Tennessee Attorney General filed a civil lawsuit for alleged deceptive practices against BlueHippo companies, as well as proposing an injunction requiring greater disclosures in advertising and prior to obtaining further payments, as well as the freezing of $2.5 million in cash. West Virginia also sued BlueHippo.

A class action lawsuit was filed against BlueHippo in the District Court of Ottawa County State of Oklahoma on January 23, 2007. This case was transferred to the United States District Court Northern District of Oklahoma on March 7, 2007.

As of August 25, 2009 the Better Business Bureau has received over 3950 grievances from all over the United States. "Due to this pattern of complaints and BlueHippo’s failure to correct the underlying causes for the complaints, the company is rated 'unsatisfactory'."

BlueHippo changed its business practices to include a refund policy in mid-2006. However, the BBB reports: "In November and December 2006, however, the volume of complaints rose again and the BBB has renewed concerns about the effectiveness of the company's efforts to reduce the volume and pattern of complaints. Current complaints allege the company is slow to provide promised refunds and there continue to be delays in delivery of the merchandise." As of January 1, 2007, BlueHippo offers a full refund if customers cancel during the first 7 days. However, any order canceled after the grace period will receive "store credit" only. This store credit will only allow customers to buy items on the company website.

BlueHippo, which applied for Chapter 7 bankruptcy in 2009 after it was no longer willing to cover its bills, subsequently committed to a 2008 deal to reimburse $5 million and changed its procedures to address claims that it had been operating a fraudulent electronic finance scheme. In 2016, the firm was forced to pay $13.4 million in restitution to defrauded customers.
