= Dubuque Bank and Trust =

American bank headquartered in Dubuque, Iowa

Dubuque Bank & Trust, a division of UMB Bank
- Traded as: Nasdaq: UMBF
- Industry: Banking
- Founded: July 3, 1935; 91 years ago
- Headquarters: Dubuque, Iowa, United States
- Total assets: $1.443 billion (2017)
- Total equity: $0.148 billion (2017)
- Parent: UMB Financial Corp.
- Website: www.dubuquebank.com

Dubuque Bank & Trust, a division of UMB Bank is a bank headquartered in Dubuque, Iowa. It is a division of UMB Financial Corporation, a bank holding company. The bank has 8 branches, all of which are in Iowa. It is the 7th largest bank headquartered in Iowa.

== History ==
The bank was established on July 3, 1935.

In 1988, the bank acquired Fireside Credit after it filed for bankruptcy protection.

In 1989, the bank acquired Key City Bank.

In 1991, the bank acquired Farley State Bank.

In 2004, Douglas J. Horstmann was named president and chief executive officer of the bank. Horstmann retired in 2017.

In 2012, the bank acquired 3 branches from Liberty Bank, FSB.
