= VoicePulse =

American communication company

VoicePulse, Inc.
- Company type: Private
- Industry: Telecommunications, VoIP
- Founded: North Brunswick, New Jersey, U.S. (2003)
- Founder: Ravi Sakaria and Ketan Patel
- Headquarters: North Brunswick, New Jersey, U.S.
- Website: www.voicepulse.com

VoicePulse was an American communications company that used its VoIP network to deliver phone service to residential and business consumers.

VoicePulse was founded and was based in North Brunswick, New Jersey, in April 2003 by Ravi Sakaria and Ketan Patel. It launched its VoicePulse FIVE telephony platform in November 2014.

In October 2022, VoicePulse users were sent communications informing them that the service would be closed by the end of that month.
