= Matthews Aurora Funeral Solutions =

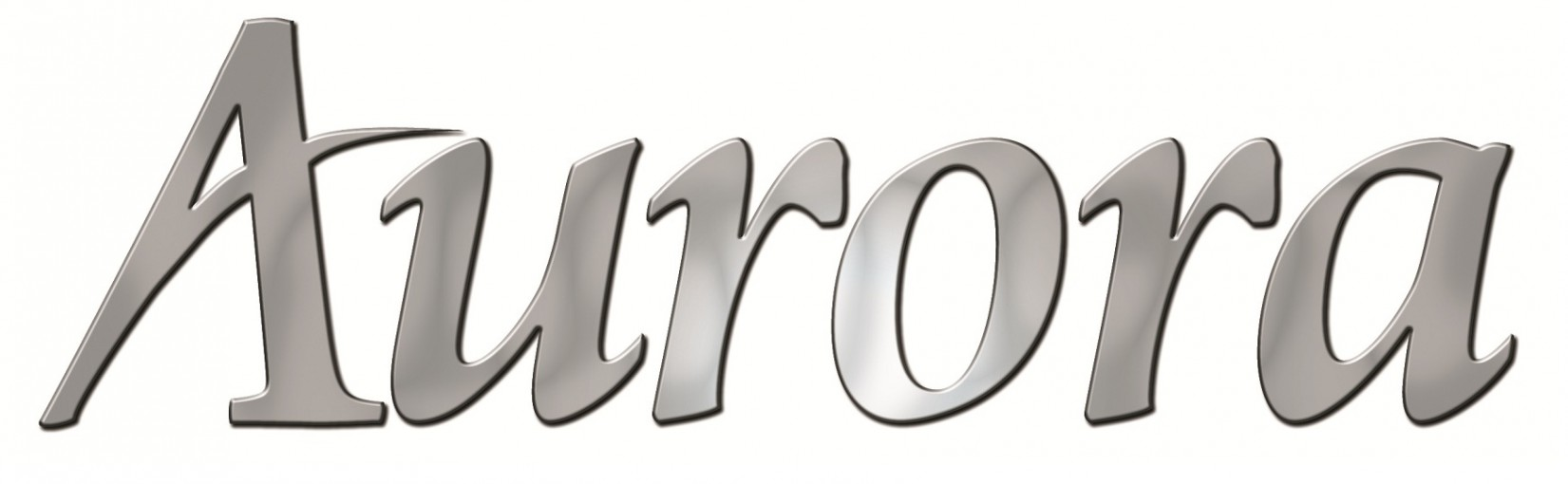
- Founded: 1890
- Founder: John Backman
- Headquarters: Aurora, Indiana, United States
- Key people: William Barrott III (CEO); William Backman III (Exec. V.P.)
- Products: Caskets, furnerary urns, and other funeral supplies
- Revenue: $142 million (2014)
- Owner: Matthews International
- Number of employees: 850 (2014)
- Website: matthewsaurora.com

Matthews Aurora Funeral Solutions (formerly the Aurora Casket Company) is one of the largest manufacturers of caskets and funerary urns in the United States, selling over 38% of the country's caskets as of 2005. The Aurora, Indiana–based company is a subsidiary of Pittsburgh-based Matthews International. The company makes both wooden and metal caskets and urns for holding cremated remains. It also provides supplies and consulting services for funeral homes.

== History ==
The company traces its roots back to 1890, when John Backman began making wooden caskets by hand. At the time, the Aurora Casket Company employed 20 people. In the 1920s, John's son William Backman and his son-in-law William Barrott joined the company. For decades, the company was controlled by the Backman and Barrott families.

In 2012, the Aurora Casket Company was acquired by private equity firm Kohlberg & Co. By 2014, the company had about 850 employees and was one of the Cincinnati metropolitan area's largest private companies. In June 2015, it was acquired by Matthews International and renamed Matthews Aurora Funeral Solutions.
