= Sycamore Bank =

Sycamore Bank, based in Senatobia, Mississippi, United States is a regional bank with assets exceeding $170 million and locations across North Mississippi.

Branches in Senatobia, Southaven, Coldwater, Hernando, and Independence serve customers in these communities as well as residents of the broader Memphis, Tennessee area.

== History ==
In 1900 a group of 35 local businessmen and farmers established Senatobia Bank.

Early photo of Sycamore Bank (then called Senatobia Bank) in Senatobia, Mississippi

As the bank grew beyond Senatobia, it was renamed Sycamore Bank as a reference to its Senatobia roots (the town's name is derived from the Native American Senatohoba, which means White Sycamore, a symbol of rest for the weary).
