= Memphis Furniture =

Memphis Furniture Manufacturing Company was the largest component of what was once the largest furniture manufacturing operation in the United States. It was founded in 1896 by Robertson Morrow and, despite a major fire in 1904, quickly grew to include Little Rock Furniture, New Orleans Furniture, and Oklahoma City Furniture.

Memphis Furniture itself employed over 1,000 people at its peak. By the late 1970s, it faced growing competition from Carolina furniture manufacturers and unionization of its workforce. The multi-story urban manufacturing facility that was so efficient in the 1920s was not competitive with the large, single story rural manufacturing facilities. It ceased operation and went into liquidation in 1983.
