= PredictifyMe =

- Company type: Private
- Industry: Predictive Analytics
- Founded: 2014
- Founder: Zeeshan-ul-hassan Usmani, Rob Burns
- Headquarters: Raleigh, United States
- Key people: Robert Burns, CEO; Zeeshan-ul-Hassan Usmani, CTO; Marcy Bucci, President; Jeff Frazier, Advisor
- Website: predictify.me

PredictifyMe is a predictive analytics company with headquarters in Research Triangle Park, North Carolina. The company uses advanced algorithms and data sets to predict outcomes of social and commercial problems. It works primarily in the fields of security, retail, education, insurance and healthcare.

== History ==
PredictifyMe was founded in 2012 by Rob Burns, Garrett Perdue and Marcy Bucci. Rob met Dr. Usmani during Eisenhower Fellows. Usmani had completed his Ph.D. at Florida Institute of Technology where his thesis involved a predictive model of suicide bombings that is used for forensic investigations and prevention tool. Burns received his M.B.A. from George Washington University and spent 15 years studying how kids' lives are impacted based on the location where they are born. Burns and Usmani worked together for two years, adapting Usmani's predictive model to predict social and commercial impacts for various regions of the world.

PredictifyMe started with seed round funding of approximately $250,000. The company tried to raise $1 million, but stopped asking for funding due to the number of clients it signed up minimized the need for extra capital. The final amount of funding totaled $305,263 according to its Form D filing. PredictifyMe was officially launched in 2014.

== Products and services ==
PredictifyMe's initial products included Hourglass and its various versions for different verticals.

The company ventured into the healthcare market in 2015, developing its Hourglass software. The software predicts potential medical outcomes such as the anticipated number of pregnancies in a particular area. It also assists in optimizing healthcare spending, predicting healthcare demands based on preemptive healthcare. Hourglass Retail is part of the software that measures impact of marketing dollars in the retail industry.

== Partnership with the United Nations ==
On March 18, 2015, UN special envoy for global education and former British Prime Minister Gordon Brown announced Partnership of United Nations with PredictifyMe. The sole purpose of Partnership was to involve the technical abilities of PredictifyMe to counter terrorist attacks on educational institutes all over the world. Mr. Brown pledged to fight terrorism and related causes that hinders the basic right of education to children.
