= Shindigz =

American party supplies retailer

- Company type: Corporation
- Industry: Ecommerce Party Supplies
- Founded: 1926
- Defunct: 2021
- Headquarters: Fort Wayne, Indiana
- Key people: Shep Moyle (owner and CEO), Chairman; Wendy Moyle (owner),
- Products: Party supplies, costumes, novelties.
- Number of employees: 350
- Website: www.shindigz.com

Shindigz was an American retailer of party supplies.

== History ==
In 1926 Hubert Stump founded Stump Printing, Inc. (the original name of the company) in South Whitley, Indiana. The original Stumps was started primarily as a local newspaper publisher and commercial printer. In 1990, Shep and Wendy Moyle purchased Stumps. In 2006, the company changed its name to Shindigz. In 2019, Shindigz moved its corporate headquarters to downtown Fort Wayne.

On Dec. 15, 2021, Shindigz told employees and customers that it was temporarily suspending operations “due to the impact of Covid on (its) business and an unforeseen financing issue with (its) bank." According to the Better Business Bureau, the Shindigz company is out of business.

== Awards ==
- Web Site of the Month, Giftware Business, November, 1999
- Party Retailer of the Year, Greetings Etc., Feb 13, 2009
- Business of the Month Award, Whitley County Chamber of Commerce Ambassadors, January 2011
