= Park National Bank (FBOP) =

Park National Bank FBOP
- Type: Subsidiary
- Industry: Banking

Park National Bank was a Chicago-based bank owned by FBOP Corporation, with branches in Chicago and several nearby suburbs. On October 30, 2009, it was closed by the Office of the Comptroller of the Currency, with the Federal Deposit Insurance Corporation named receiver, and its deposits and branches were transferred to U.S. Bank.
