= List of Wisconsin companies =

Wisconsin companies

This is a list of companies in Wisconsin, which is a state in the Upper Midwest and Great Lakes regions of the United States. In 2025, Wisconsin's current-dollar gross state product was $473.0 billion. Manufacturing, agriculture, and tourism have historically been major sectors of the state's economy. The Wisconsin Economic Development Corporation identifies several key industries in the state, including biohealth, water technology, advanced manufacturing, forest products, energy, power and controls, and food and beverage.

== Notable firms ==
This list includes notable companies with primary headquarters located in the state. The industry and sector follow the Industry Classification Benchmark taxonomy. Organizations which have ceased operations, relocated, or were acquired are included and noted.

Notable companies Status: P=Private, S=State; A=Active, D=Defunct
Name	Industry	Sector	Headquarters	Founded	Notes	Status	
A. O. Smith	Consumer goods	Durable household products	Milwaukee	1874	Water heaters, boilers, and water treatment products	P	A
ABC Supply	Industrials	Building materials	Beloit	1982	Roofing, siding, and building-products distributor	P	A
Acuity Insurance	Financials	Property and casualty insurance	Sheboygan	1925	Insurance	P	A
Air Wisconsin	Industrials	Airlines	Appleton	1965	Regional airline	P	A
Alliance Laundry Systems	Consumer goods	Durable household products	Ripon	1908	Commercial laundry equipment	P	A
Alliant Energy	Utilities	Conventional electricity	Madison	1917	Electric and gas utility holding company	P	A
American Family Insurance	Financials	Full line insurance	Madison	1927	Insurance	P	A
American Girl	Consumer goods	Recreational products	Middleton	1986	Dolls, books, and children's products; acquired by Mattel	P	A
Amsoil	Basic materials	Specialty chemicals	Superior	1972	Synthetic lubricants	P	A
Ariens	Consumer goods	Recreational products	Brillion	1933	Outdoor power equipment	P	A
Ashley Furniture Industries	Consumer goods	Furnishings	Arcadia	1945	Furniture manufacturer and retailer	P	A
Associated Banc-Corp	Financials	Banks	Green Bay	1861	Regional bank holding company	P	A
Astronautics Corporation of America	Industrials	Aerospace and defense	Oak Creek	1959	Avionics and aerospace systems	P	A
Bay Shipbuilding Company	Industrials	Marine transportation	Sturgeon Bay	1918	Shipbuilding and repair	P	A
Bemis Company	Basic materials	Containers and packaging	Neenah	1858	Packaging company acquired by Amcor	P	D
Bemis Manufacturing Company	Consumer goods	Durable household products	Sheboygan Falls	1901	Toilet seats, health care products, and molded plastic products	P	A
Ben Franklin	Consumer services	Specialty retailers	Mount Pleasant	1927	Variety store and craft retail chain	P	A
Blain's Farm & Fleet	Consumer services	Specialty retailers	Janesville	1955	Farm, home, and automotive retailer	P	A
Brady Corporation	Industrials	Electronic equipment	Milwaukee	1914	Identification, safety, and labeling products	P	A
Briggs & Stratton	Industrials	Machinery	Wauwatosa	1908	Small engines and outdoor power equipment	P	A
Case IH	Industrials	Commercial vehicles and trucks	Racine	1985	Agricultural equipment brand	P	A
Colony Brands	Consumer services	Broadline retailers	Monroe	1926	Mail-order and online retail company	P	A
Consolidated Papers, Inc.	Basic materials	Paper	Wisconsin Rapids	1894	Paper manufacturer acquired by Stora Enso in 2000	P	D
Cousins Subs	Consumer services	Restaurants and bars	Menomonee Falls	1972	Sandwich restaurant chain	P	A
Culver's	Consumer services	Restaurants and bars	Prairie du Sac	1984	Fast casual restaurant chain	P	A
Dairyland Power Cooperative	Utilities	Conventional electricity	La Crosse	1941	Electric generation and transmission cooperative	P	A
Dremel	Industrials	Machinery	Racine	1932	Power tool brand founded in Wisconsin; acquired by Bosch	P	A
Duluth Trading Company	Consumer services	Apparel retailers	Mount Horeb	1989	Workwear and casual clothing retailer	P	A
Electronic Theatre Controls	Industrials	Electronic equipment	Middleton	1975	Lighting, rigging, and control equipment	P	A
Enerpac Tool Group	Industrials	Machinery	Milwaukee	1910	Industrial tools and high-pressure hydraulic equipment	P	A
Epic Systems	Technology	Software	Verona	1979	Health care software	P	A
Evinrude Outboard Motors	Consumer goods	Recreational products	Sturtevant	1907	Outboard motor brand; production discontinued	P	D
Exact Sciences Corporation	Health care	Biotechnology	Madison	1995	Molecular diagnostics and cancer screening tests	P	A
Festival Foods	Consumer services	Food retailers and wholesalers	Onalaska	1946	Grocery stores	P	A
Fiserv	Technology	Software	Milwaukee	1984	Financial technology and payment processing	P	A
Fleet Farm	Consumer services	Specialty retailers	Appleton	1955	Farm, home, and automotive retailer	P	A
Fraser Shipyards	Industrials	Marine transportation	Superior	1888	Shipbuilding and repair	P	A
Freight Runners Express	Industrials	Delivery services	Milwaukee	1983	Cargo airline	P	A
Generac	Industrials	Electrical components and equipment	Waukesha	1959	Generators and power equipment	P	A
Green Bay Packaging	Basic materials	Containers and packaging	Green Bay	1933	Paperboard and packaging	P	A
Gundersen Health System	Health care	Health care providers	La Crosse	1891	Health care system	P	A
Harken	Consumer goods	Recreational products	Pewaukee	1967	Sailing hardware and equipment	P	A
Harley-Davidson	Consumer goods	Automobiles	Milwaukee	1903	Motorcycle manufacturer	P	A
InSinkErator	Consumer goods	Durable household products	Racine	1938	Garbage disposals and instant hot water dispensers	P	A
Jockey International	Consumer goods	Clothing and accessories	Kenosha	1876	Apparel manufacturer	P	A
Johnson Controls	Industrials	Building systems	Milwaukee	1885	Building technology company; later based in Cork, Ireland	P	A
Johnsonville Foods	Consumer goods	Food products	Sheboygan Falls	1945	Sausage and meat products	P	A
Journal Media Group	Consumer services	Publishing	Milwaukee	2015	Newspaper publishing company acquired by Gannett	P	D
Joy Global	Industrials	Machinery	Milwaukee	1884	Mining equipment company acquired by Komatsu Limited	P	D
Kohler Co.	Consumer goods	Durable household products	Kohler	1873	Plumbing products, furniture, engines, and hospitality	P	A
Kohl's	Consumer services	Broadline retailers	Menomonee Falls	1962	Department store chain	P	A
Kopp's Frozen Custard	Consumer services	Restaurants and bars	Greenfield	1950	Frozen custard restaurant chain	P	A
Koss Corporation	Consumer goods	Consumer electronics	Milwaukee	1953	Headphones and audio equipment	P	A
Kwik Trip	Consumer services	Specialty retailers	La Crosse	1965	Convenience store and gas station chain	P	A
La Crosse Technology	Consumer goods	Consumer electronics	La Crosse	1983	Weather stations, clocks, and consumer electronics	P	A
LaCrosse Footwear	Consumer goods	Footwear	La Crosse	1897	Footwear company later moved to Portland, Oregon	P	D
Lake Express	Industrials	Marine transportation	Milwaukee	2004	High-speed ferry service across Lake Michigan	P	A
Lands' End	Consumer services	Apparel retailers	Dodgeville	1963	Apparel and home goods retailer	P	A
ManpowerGroup	Industrials	Support services	Milwaukee	1948	Staffing and workforce services	P	A
Marcus Corporation	Consumer services	Recreational services	Milwaukee	1935	Movie theaters and hotels	P	A
The Manitowoc Company	Industrials	Machinery	Milwaukee	1902	Cranes and lifting equipment	P	A
Marine Credit Union	Financials	Banks	La Crosse	1949	Credit union and financial services	P	A
Marinette Marine	Industrials	Marine transportation	Marinette	1942	Shipbuilding	P	A
Mars Cheese Castle	Consumer services	Food retailers and wholesalers	Kenosha	1947	Cheese shop and tourist attraction	P	A
Marshall & Ilsley	Financials	Banks	Milwaukee	1847	Bank holding company acquired by Bank of Montreal	P	D
Marten Transport	Industrials	Trucking	Mondovi	1946	Truckload carrier	P	A
Master Lock	Consumer goods	Durable household products	Oak Creek	1921	Locks and security products	P	A
Menards	Consumer services	Home improvement retailers	Eau Claire	1960	Home improvement retailer	P	A
Mercury Marine	Consumer goods	Recreational products	Fond du Lac	1939	Marine engines	P	A
MGE Energy	Utilities	Conventional electricity	Madison	1855	Electric and gas utility holding company	P	A
Michels Corporation	Industrials	Heavy construction	Brownsville	1959	Construction and infrastructure contractor	P	A
Midwest Airlines	Industrials	Airlines	Oak Creek	1984	Airline merged with Frontier Airlines	P	D
Milio's Sandwiches	Consumer services	Restaurants and bars	Fitchburg	1989	Sandwich restaurant chain	P	A
Miller Electric	Industrials	Electrical components and equipment	Appleton	1929	Welding equipment	P	A
Milwaukee Electric Tool	Industrials	Machinery	Milwaukee	1924	Power tools	P	A
Miron Construction	Industrials	Heavy construction	Neenah	1918	Construction company	P	A
Modine Manufacturing	Industrials	Machinery	Racine	1916	Thermal management systems and heat exchangers	P	A
Montgomery Ward	Consumer services	Broadline retailers	Monroe	1872	Catalog and online retail brand	P	A
National Presto Industries	Consumer goods	Durable household products	Eau Claire	1905	Housewares, defense products, and absorbent products	P	A
Neenah Foundry	Industrials	Building materials	Neenah	1872	Cast iron infrastructure components	P	A
Northwestern Mutual	Financials	Life insurance	Milwaukee	1857	Life insurance and financial services	P	A
Omanhene Cocoa Bean Company	Consumer goods	Food products	Milwaukee	1991	Chocolate manufacturer	P	A
Organic Valley	Consumer goods	Food products	La Farge	1988	Organic dairy and food cooperative	P	A
Oshkosh Corporation	Industrials	Commercial vehicles and trucks	Oshkosh	1917	Specialty vehicles and defense vehicles	P	A
Pacific Cycle	Consumer goods	Recreational products	Madison	1977	Bicycles and cycling products	P	A
Promega	Health care	Biotechnology	Madison	1978	Biotechnology and molecular biology products	P	A
Quad	Industrials	Support services	Sussex	1971	Print, marketing, packaging, and media services	P	A
Quest CE	Consumer services	Specialized consumer services	Milwaukee	1986	Continuing education and compliance training	P	A
Regal Rexnord	Industrials	Machinery	Milwaukee	1955	Electric motors and power transmission components	P	A
Renaissance Learning	Technology	Software	Wisconsin Rapids	1986	Educational software	P	A
REV Group	Industrials	Commercial vehicles and trucks	Brookfield	2010	Specialty vehicles, including ambulances, buses, fire apparatus, and recreational vehicles	P	A
Rice Lake Weighing Systems	Industrials	Weighing and measuring instruments	Rice Lake	1945	Weighing systems	P	A
Rockwell Automation	Industrials	Electronic equipment	Milwaukee	1903	Industrial automation and information technology	P	A
Rocky Rococo	Consumer services	Restaurants and bars	Oconomowoc	1974	Pizza restaurant chain	P	A
Roehl Transport	Industrials	Trucking	Marshfield	1962	Truckload carrier	P	A
Roundy's	Consumer services	Food retailers and wholesalers	Milwaukee	1872	Grocery store operator	P	A
S. C. Johnson & Son	Consumer goods	Nondurable household products	Racine	1886	Household cleaning and consumer products	P	A
Sargento	Consumer goods	Food products	Plymouth	1953	Cheese and packaged food products	P	A
Schneider National	Industrials	Trucking	Green Bay	1935	Trucking and intermodal freight transport	P	A
Schreiber Foods	Consumer goods	Food products	Green Bay	1945	Dairy products	P	A
Sentry Foods	Consumer services	Food retailers and wholesalers	Milwaukee	1950	Grocery stores	P	A
Sentry Insurance	Financials	Property and casualty insurance	Stevens Point	1904	Insurance	P	A
Skyward	Technology	Software	Stevens Point	1980	School administration software	P	A
Skyway Airlines	Industrials	Airlines	Oak Creek	1989	Regional airline that ceased operations in 2008	P	D
Snap-on	Industrials	Machinery	Kenosha	1920	Tools and equipment	P	A
Spancrete	Industrials	Building materials	Waukesha	1946	Precast concrete products	P	A
Spectrum Brands	Consumer goods	Durable household products	Middleton	1906	Consumer products, home appliances, lawn and garden, and pet supplies	P	A
Spot Filmworks	Consumer services	Media	Madison	1997	Film and media production	P	A
Sprecher Brewery	Consumer goods	Brewers	Glendale	1985	Brewery and craft soda producer	P	A
Sub-Zero	Consumer goods	Durable household products	Madison	1945	Refrigerators, freezers, and kitchen appliances	P	A
Thilmany Papers	Basic materials	Paper	Kaukauna	1883	Specialty paper manufacturer; later incorporated into Ahlstrom-Munksjö	P	D
Trane	Industrials	Building systems	La Crosse	1913	Heating, ventilation, and air conditioning systems, acquired by Ingersoll Rand, spun off as Trane Technologies.	P	D
Trek Bicycle Corporation	Consumer goods	Recreational products	Waterloo	1976	Bicycle manufacturer	P	A
Twin Disc	Industrials	Machinery	Milwaukee	1918	Power transmission equipment	P	A
Uline	Industrials	Support services	Pleasant Prairie	1980	Shipping, packaging, and industrial supplies	P	A
The Vollrath Company	Industrials	Machinery	Sheboygan	1874	Commercial foodservice equipment and supplies	P	A
Wausau Homes	Consumer goods	Home construction	Wausau	1960	Modular and custom homebuilder	P	A
Wausau Paper	Basic materials	Paper	Mosinee	1899	Paper manufacturer acquired by SCA in 2016	P	A
WEC Energy Group	Utilities	Conventional electricity	Milwaukee	1896	Electric and gas utility holding company	P	A
Western States Envelope & Label	Industrials	Containers and packaging	Butler	1908	Envelopes and labels	P	A
Wisconsin and Southern Railroad	Industrials	Railroads	Madison	1980	Regional railroad	P	A
Wisconsin Bell	Telecommunications	Fixed line telecommunications	Milwaukee	1883	Telecommunications company	P	A
Wisconsin Great Northern Railroad	Industrials	Railroads	Trego	1997	Heritage railroad	P	A
Wisconsin Public Service Corporation	Utilities	Conventional electricity	Green Bay	1883	Electric and gas utility	P	A
Woodman's Markets	Consumer services	Food retailers and wholesalers	Janesville	1919	Grocery stores	P	A

== See also ==
- Agriculture in Wisconsin
- Bus transportation services in Wisconsin
- Economy of Wisconsin
- List of companies of the United States by state
- List of companies in Madison
- List of companies in Milwaukee
- List of manufacturing companies based in Wisconsin
- List of Wisconsin railroads
- Lists of occupations
- List of shopping malls in Wisconsin
