= WZEZ (FM) =

- Balsam Lake, Wisconsin; United States
- Broadcast area: Rice Lake, Wisconsin/Northwest Wisconsin
- Frequency: 104.9 MHz
- RDS: PI: 972D; PS: ARTIST TITLE 104.9 THE CABIN AN OBERG FAMILY STATION
- Branding: 104.9 The Cabin

Programming
- Format: Classic hits

Ownership
- Owner: Zoe Communications, Inc.
- Sister stations: WXCX, WGMO, WPLT, WXNK, WJBL

History
- First air date: February 14, 1997 (s WWLC) (as WWLC)
- Former call signs: WWLC (1996–2000); WLMX-FM (2000–2018)
- Call sign meaning: W Z EZ 104.9 (calls used for previous format)

Technical information
- Licensing authority: FCC
- Facility ID: 66824
- Class: C3
- ERP: 22,000 watts
- HAAT: 106 meters (348 ft)
- Transmitter coordinates: 45°29′27″N 92°11′34″W

Links
- Public license information: Public file; LMS
- Webcast: Listen Live

WZEZ (104.9 MHz, "104.9 The Cabin") is an FM radio station broadcasting a classic hits format. Licensed to Balsam Lake, Wisconsin, United States, it serves the Turtle Lake, Wisconsin area. Established in 1997 as WWLC, the station is owned by Zoe Communications, Inc. and features local programming.

WZEZ currently features a 1980s-centered Classic Hits format that spans from the 1970s to the early-2000's. Outside of the syndicated Murphy, Sam & Jodi morning show, the station runs jockless with minimal commercials and interruptions.

== History ==
The station first signed on as WWLC with a country music format called "Lake Country 104.9" in early 1997. WWLC was owned by Red Cedar Broadcasting, which also owned WAQE and WAQE-FM in Rice Lake. However, WWLC was sold off when then owner of WJMC and WJMC-FM in Rice Lake purchased WAQE AM-FM in 1998.

Casey Communications, owned by Marigen and Charlie Anderson of Luck, Wisconsin (80%) and Scot O'Malley of Hudson, Wisconsin (20%), purchased WWLC and took the station off the air in August 1998. During the silent period, the new owners constructed a studio on Main Street in Milltown and reached an agreement for Pine City Broadcasting, owner of WCMP and WCMP-FM in Pine City, Minnesota, to run the station.

WWLC returned to the air in early 1999 with an adult contemporary format as "StarStation 104.9," carrying ABC's StarStation format outside of local morning and afternoon shows. The station carried local newscasts and high school sports, and later added newscasts from the Wisconsin Radio Network. It also carried Green Bay Packers football in the 1999-2000 season.

In September 2000, the agreement with Pine City Broadcasting was severed, and Casey Communications took over day-to-day operations of WWLC and sister station WXCX, which had signed on earlier that year. Casey Communications changed WWLC's callsign to WLMX-FM and the slogan to "Mix 105," but other programming remained unchanged.

Quarnstrom Media purchased WLMX-FM and WXCX in late 2002 and began operating the stations through a local marketing agreement on October 1, 2002. The new owners switched WLMX-FM to a hot adult contemporary format in early 2003, dropping local news and the Wisconsin Radio Network. The station later added Minnesota Vikings football.

In early 2006, WLMX-FM and WXCX moved their studios to Luck. Later in 2006, Quarnstrom Media agreed to sell WLMX-FM and WXCX, along with seven other stations in Wisconsin and Minnesota, to Red Rock Radio for $7.5 million. WLMX-FM reverted its format to adult contemporary on August 16, 2006.

On March 5, 2008, WLMX-FM switched to a classic country format.

Logo as "Mix 105"

On July 7, 2008 WLMX-FM changed their format back to adult contemporary, branded as "Mix 105".

On July 20, 2016, Red Rock Radio announced that it would sell WLMX-FM to Zoe Communications as part of a five station deal; the sale was completed on September 30, 2016. On November 7, 2016, WLMX-FM flipped to classic hits branded as "Max 104.9", however, WLMX-FM would soon revert to its previous adult hits format while keeping the same branding.

In January 2019, WLMX flipped to soft adult contemporary branded as "E-Z 104.9." To reflect this change, the call sign would be changed from WLMX-FM to WZEZ on December 31, 2018.

In 2022, WZEZ was granted the ability by the FCC to transmit an HD Radio signal; however the station has yet to activate it.

On March 25, 2023, WZEZ flipped to a classic hits format, branded as "104.9 The Cabin".
