= WJBL =

- Ladysmith, Wisconsin; United States
- Frequency: 93.1 MHz
- RDS: PS/RT: THE CABIN AN OBERG FAMILY STATION
- Branding: 93.1 The Cabin

Programming
- Format: Classic hits
- Affiliations: Westwood One; Salem Radio Network (WeatherTime LLC)

Ownership
- Owner: Michael Oberg and George Manus; (Zoe Communications Co., Inc.)
- Sister stations: WLDY, WXNK, WGMO, WPLT, WHSM-FM, WZEZ, WXCX

History
- First air date: 1984 (as WLDY-FM)
- Former call signs: WLDY-FM (1983–1993)

Technical information
- Licensing authority: FCC
- Facility ID: 21697
- Class: A
- ERP: 4,900 watts
- HAAT: 109 meters
- Transmitter coordinates: 45°27′59.00″N 91°7′23.00″W

Links
- Public license information: Public file; LMS

WJBL (93.1 FM; "93.1 The Cabin") is a radio station broadcasting a classic hits format. Licensed to Ladysmith, Wisconsin, United States, the station is owned by Michael Oberg and George Manus, through licensee Zoe Communications Co., Inc. It features programming from Westwood One and Salem Radio Network.

== History ==
WJBL traces its history to WLDY-FM, the FM companion to WLDY in Ladysmith. In 1985, trade publication Broadcasting reported that WLDY-FM was seeking a modification of its construction permit for 92.7 MHz to operate with 1.69 kW ERP and a height above average terrain of 376 feet; the application was reported granted the following month.

By 1990, FMedia! listed WLDY-FM on 92.7 MHz and described the station as monophonic, quoting the station as saying, "We have not formulated plans to add stereo." In 1991, the FCC changed the Ladysmith FM assignment from channel 224A, 92.7 MHz, to channel 226A, 93.1 MHz, and conditionally modified WLDY-FM's license accordingly. Contemporary trade listings also reported WLDY-FM's move to 93.1 MHz from 92.7 MHz.

The 93.1 MHz facilities were implemented by 1993, when FMedia! reported WLDY-FM's facility change to 4.9 kW horizontal and vertical ERP at 109 meters HAAT. Later in 1993, the station became WJBL; FMedia! listed "WJBL (WLDY-FM)" at Ladysmith, and The M Street Journal reported that WJBL had changed format from WLDY-FM's adult contemporary format to Jones Satellite Network oldies.

In 1997, Radio Business Report reported a $450,000 transaction involving WLDY-AM and WJBL-FM as a 100-percent stock sale of Flambeau Broadcasting Co. from Gary R. Johnson and Bernice C. Beyer to Randy Hudzinski. The report said the price consisted of $270,000 for the stock and $90,000 to each seller for non-compete agreements, and that the sale did not include the sellers' application for a construction permit for a new FM station at Cornell, Wisconsin.

By 2012, WJBL was licensed to Roth Broadcasting, Inc.; an FCC public notice listed Roth's renewal application for WJBL, facility ID 21697, on 93.1 MHz at Ladysmith. In March 2013, the FCC granted an involuntary transfer of control of WJBL from David and Sandra Roth to Randy Hudzinski as receiver for Roth Broadcasting, Inc.

In 2020, trade reports identified Flambeau Broadcasting Co., Inc. as the owner of WJBL and WLDY. The Wisconsin Broadcasters Association reported that the two Ladysmith stations were being sold to Zoe Communications and that Zoe was already operating them under a local marketing agreement. NorthPine reported that the deal included classic-hits WJBL, operating as a Class A signal with 4.9 kW at 109 meters HAAT, and that the FCC application showed a $100,000 purchase price for WJBL and WLDY. The FCC granted assignment of WJBL's license from Flambeau Broadcasting to Zoe Communications on December 9, 2020.

After Zoe began operating the station, WJBL retained its classic hits format and changed its branding to "93.1 The Cabin" in October 2020. In 2024, NorthPine described WJBL as one of Zoe's stations using "The Cabin" branding. Current station-data listings identify WJBL as a licensed Class A FM facility on 93.1 MHz, facility ID 21697, licensed to Zoe Communications Inc. with 4.9 kW ERP and 109 meters HAAT.
