= WAQE =

WAQE may refer to:

- WAQE (AM), a radio station (1090 AM) licensed to Rice Lake, Wisconsin
- WAQE-FM, a radio station (97.7 FM) licensed to Barron, Wisconsin
- WKFX, a radio station (99.1 FM) licensed to Rice Lake, Wisconsin, which held the call sign WAQE from 1980 to 1999
- WLIF, a radio station (101.9 FM) licensed to Baltimore, Maryland, which held the call sign WAQE from 1960 to 1967
