= WJMC =

WJMC may refer to:

- WJMC (AM), a radio station (1240 AM) licensed to Rice Lake, Wisconsin, United States
- WJMC-FM, a radio station (96.1 FM) licensed to Rice Lake, Wisconsin
