= Jason Rae =

American politician (born 1986)

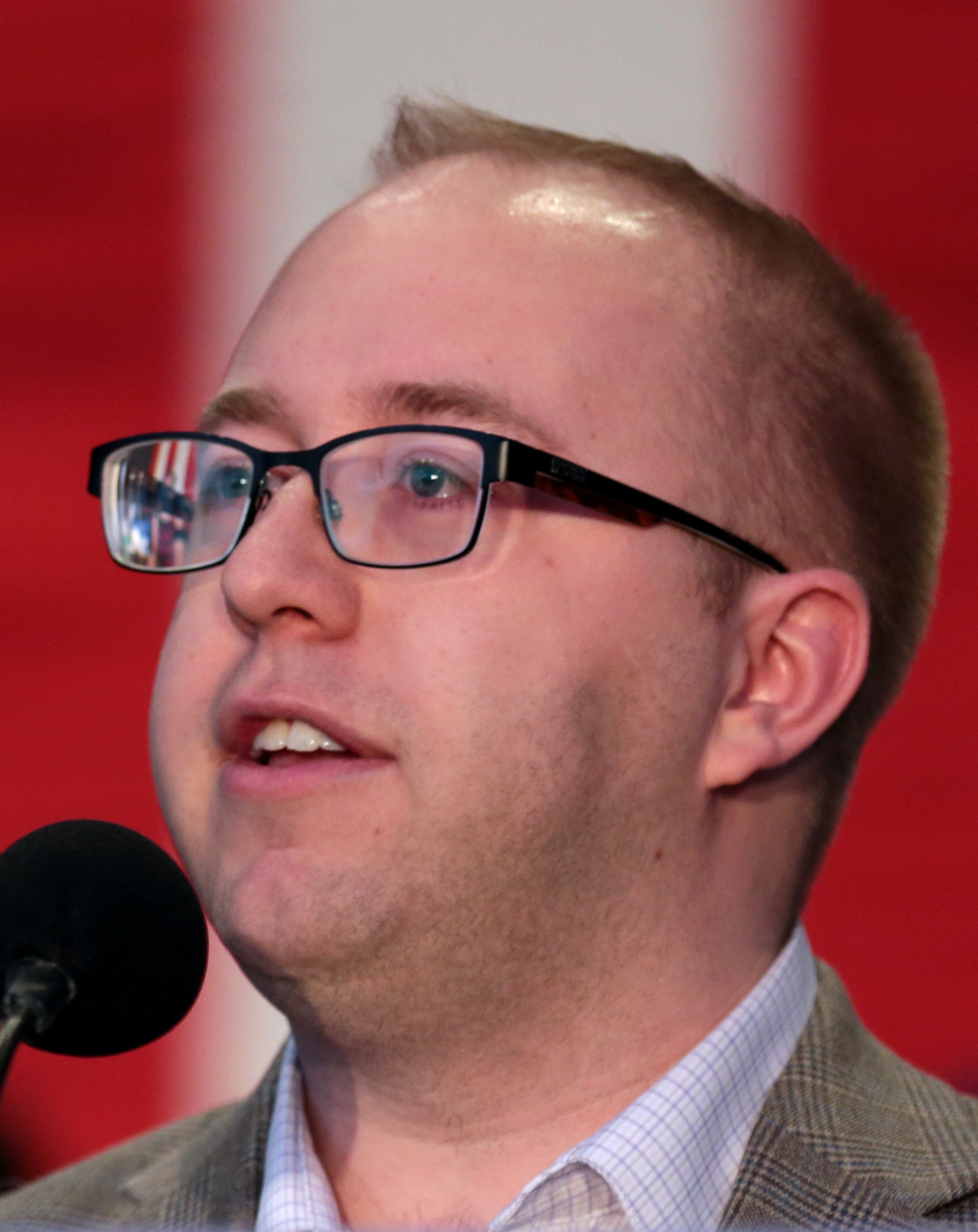

Secretary of the Democratic National Committee
- Incumbent
- Assumed office February 25, 2017
- Chair: Tom Perez; Jaime Harrison; Ken Martin
- Preceded by: Stephanie Rawlings-Blake

Personal details
- Born: November 25, 1986 (age 39) Rice Lake, Wisconsin, U.S.
- Party: Democratic
- Spouse: Phillip Bailey
- Education: Marquette University (BA)

Jason Rae (born November 25, 1986) is an American activist and Democratic National Committee (DNC) member from Wisconsin. He was the youngest person ever elected to the DNC in 2004. On February 25, 2017, Rae was elected to serve as secretary of the DNC and was re-elected to the position in 2021 and 2025.

He is also the founder, president, and CEO of the Wisconsin LGBT Chamber of Commerce.

== Early life and education ==
Rae was born in Rice Lake, Wisconsin, to John and Lori Rae. He attended Marquette University, graduating with a BA in history and political science. He is a partner at Nation Consulting in Milwaukee.

== College activism ==
Rae was the chair of the Marquette University chapter of College Democrats and was elected Chair of the College Democrats of Wisconsin in 2008. Within Marquette University Student Government (MUSG), he was Legislative Vice President, in which he formed of the Ad Hoc Committee on Funding of Student Activities. He previously served in the MUSG Senate as Senator, student representative to the Faculty Academic Senate, College of Arts & Sciences Committee chair, and Parliamentarian. Rae was the author of a bill passed by the Marquette University Student Government to provide domestic partner benefits to faculty.

Rae is a member of the Southeast Wisconsin Professional Baseball Park District Board, VISIT Milwaukee, and the United Way Campaign Cabinet. He has previously served on the Board of Directors for the Rice Lake Boys and Girls Club.

== Political involvement ==
In 2004, Rae was vice chair of the Barron County Democratic Party and was appointed to Senator Russ Feingold's re-election steering committee.

Rae was elected to the Democratic National Committee (DNC) in June 2004. At the time of his election to his leadership role within the party, he was 17, making him the youngest person ever elected to the DNC. Rae defeated a state legislator and the president of the state's firefighters' union to win his position.

During summer 2006, Rae interned at the Gay and Lesbian Victory Fund. He came out as gay to members of the DNC in February 2007. In spring 2007, Governor Jim Doyle (D-WI) appointed Rae as the youth representative to the Governor's Commission on the United Nations.

Rae worked on the Allen Thomell campaign for the Georgia State House and the Herb Kohl for United States Senate campaign. He has also interned at People for the American Way.

Rae served as the board president of Fair Wisconsin, a statewide LGBT advocacy organization.He has also served as the chair of the Milwaukee County Human Rights Commission and vice chair of the Marquette University Gender & Sexuality Resource Center Advisory Board.

In 2017, Rae was elected as the DNC Secretary and was renominated for the position in 2021 with the support of US President Joe Biden. He was re-elected again in 2025 and has been serving as the DNC Secretary since. In the 2025 elections, Rae received 338.5 votes against Marilyn Davis's 68.5 votes.

During the 2020 Democratic National Convention, Rae called for the roll of the states in a revised nomination process, which was held virtually amid the pandemic of COVID-19. He was selected again to call the roll for the Democratic National Convention in 2024.

In 2012, Rae established the Wisconsin LGBT Chamber of Commerce, an organization with over 600 business members. Since then, he has been serving as its CEO and president. Rae is also a partner at Nation Consulting, a public affairs firm based in Milwaukee.
