= Acute =

Acute may refer to:

== Language ==
- Acute accent, a diacritic used in many modern written languages
- Acute (phonetic), a perceptual classification

== Science and mathematics ==
- Acute angle
  - Acute triangle
  - Acute, a leaf shape in the glossary of leaf morphology
- Acute (medicine), a disease that it is of short duration and of recent onset
  - Acute toxicity, the adverse effects of a substance from a single exposure or in a short period of time

== See also ==
- Acutance, in photography, subjective perception of sharpness related to the edge contrast of an image
- Acuity (disambiguation)
