= WXCX =

Radio station in Siren, Wisconsin

- Siren, Wisconsin; United States
- Broadcast area: Northwestern Wisconsin/Northeastern Minnesota
- Frequency: 105.7 MHz
- Branding: Willie 105-7

Programming
- Format: Classic country

Ownership
- Owner: Zoe Communications, Inc.
- Sister stations: WGMO, WXNK, WZEZ, WPLT

History
- First air date: February 7, 2000
- Former call signs: WBEP (1998–1999, CP)

Technical information
- Licensing authority: FCC
- Facility ID: 85876
- Class: A
- ERP: 6,000 watts
- HAAT: 100 meters (330 ft)
- Transmitter coordinates: 45.829°N 92.478°W
- Translator: 93.5 W228BQ (Rice Lake)
- Repeater: 95.3 WGMO-HD3 (Spooner)

Links
- Public license information: Public file; LMS
- Webcast: Listen Live
- Website: WXCX's Facebook page

WXCX (105.7 FM) is a radio station licensed to Siren, Wisconsin. WXCX transmits with 6 kW at 100 meters (class A) from a tower in central Burnett County. The station broadcasts a classic country format. It is owned by Zoe Communications, Inc. and has studios in Shell Lake, Wisconsin.

== History ==
105.7 was originally assigned the call letters WBEP, which were never used on the air. Casey Communications began test broadcasts of WXCX on December 28, 1999, simulcasting sister station WWLC in Balsam Lake, Wisconsin (now WZEZ). At the time, Pine City Broadcasting, owner of WCMP and WCMP-FM in Pine City, Minnesota, operated WWLC and WXCX through a local marketing agreement. WWLC and WXCX shared studios on Main Street in Milltown.

WXCX began its own format of 1960s' and '70s' oldies music on February 7, 2000, using programming from ABC's Oldies Radio format. In addition to local news updates and high school sports broadcasts, the station carried newscasts from the Wisconsin Radio Network and Green Bay Packers football beginning in fall 2000.

In September 2000, the agreement with Pine City Broadcasting was severed, and Casey Communications took over day-to-day operations of WWLC and WXCX, changing WWLC's callsign to WLMX-FM. WXCX later added agricultural news from the Brownfield Network.

Quarnstrom Media purchased WLMX-FM and WXCX in late 2002 and began operating the stations through a local marketing agreement on October 1, 2002. The new owners switched WXCX to Jones Radio Networks' Oldies format in early 2003, and then to JRN's Classic Hits format in early 2004. WXCX dropped programming from WRN and Brownfield, but continued to carry Packers football.

In early 2006, WLMX-FM and WXCX moved their studios to their present location in Luck.

Later in 2006, Quarnstrom Media agreed to sell WLMX-FM and WXCX, along with seven other stations in Wisconsin and Minnesota, to Red Rock Radio for $7.5 million. The FCC approved the sale in July 2006. Red Rock Radio later agreed to purchase WCMP-AM-FM in Pine City, restoring the link between WCMP and WXCX.

On November 2, 2011, WXCX changed their format from classic hits to adult hits, branded as "Sam 105.7".

On August 5, 2015, WXCX changed its format from adult hits to sports, branded as "105.7 The Fan". Most of WXCX's programming was supplied by the FAN Radio Network, based out of KFXN-FM in Minneapolis, with NBC Sports Radio programming airing at night and on weekends. WXCX was the FAN Radio Network's first affiliate in Wisconsin; however, despite carrying Minneapolis-based sports talk shows, the station continued to broadcast Green Bay Packers games.

On July 20, 2016, Red Rock Radio announced that it would sell WXCX to Zoe Communications as part of a five station deal; the sale was completed on September 30, 2016. On October 10, 2016, WXCX changed their format to classic country, branded as "WILLIE 105.7".
