= Wired Wisconsin =

Wired Wisconsin is a non-profit coalition of individuals, businesses and organizations involved in implementing technology and technological advances in Wisconsin. The coalition works to support an environment for innovative technology, high-tech job creation and economic growth. Wired Wisconsin educates consumers, policy makers and businesses about technology related legislative and regulatory issues that impact the lives of Wisconsin residents and businesses, and advocates for approaches that spur innovation and grow the state's economy. Wired Wisconsin is based in Milwaukee, Wisconsin.

In addition, the organization helps disseminate information related to broadband access.

The coalition is part of Midwest Consumers for Choice and Competition, a broader non-profit organization of state chapters and individual consumers interested in technology, broadband and telecommunication issues in the Midwest region. This regional non-profit organization promotes and supports access and broadband deployment, as well as technological and economic job growth in the Midwest. The organization is managed by executive director Thad Nation as part of Nation Consulting.

== Activities ==
In 2011, Wired Wisconsin hosted a series of broadband forums throughout Wisconsin in various communities.
