= WGMO =

- Spooner, Wisconsin; United States
- Broadcast area: Rice Lake, Wisconsin / Hayward, Wisconsin
- Frequency: 95.3 MHz (HD Radio)
- RDS: PS/RT: ARTIST TITLE 95-GMO AN OBERG FAMILY STATION
- Branding: 95 GMO

Programming
- Format: Classic rock
- Subchannels: HD2: Classic hits "Rice Lake's 94.7 The River"; HD3: Classic country "Willie 105.7" (WXCX simulcast)

Ownership
- Owner: Zoe Communications, Inc.
- Sister stations: WXNK, WZEZ, WPLT, WXCX

History
- First air date: 1975 (as WKCF)
- Call sign meaning: WKCF (1975-1977)

Technical information
- Licensing authority: FCC
- Facility ID: 10529
- Class: C3
- ERP: 7,100 watts
- HAAT: 156 meters (512 ft)
- Transmitter coordinates: 45°40′28.00″N 91°58′52.00″W
- Translators: HD2: 94.7 W234BG (Chetek); HD3: 93.5 W228BQ (Rice Lake)

Links
- Public license information: Public file; LMS
- Webcast: Listen live
- Website: 95gmo.com

WGMO (95.3 FM; "95 GMO") is a radio station broadcasting a classic rock format. Licensed to Spooner, Wisconsin, United States, the station serves the Rice Lake area with the broadcast studios in Shell Lake. The station is owned by Zoe Communications, Inc.

WGMO features a classic rock format that was patterned after KQRS-FM in the Twin Cities prior to their 2025 transition to mainstream rock, and also features imaging voiced by former KQRS morning show host Tom Barnard.

Chris Nelson currently hosts weekday afternoons from 2 pm until 7 pm on WGMO. Former 93X/KQRS Twin Cities radio veteran Mike Dousette returns to rock radio, hosts mornings from 5 am - 10 am weekdays on 95GMO.

== History ==
WGMO began broadcasting in 1975 at its current frequency of 95.3 MHz licensed to Shell Lake, Wisconsin under the callsign WKCF and owned by Erwin Gladdenbegk. In 1976, Gladdenbegk would sell WKCF to Charles R. Lutz for $60,000. In 1977, now under Lutz's ownership, WKCF would change its callsign to WGMO.

WGMO was listed in the 1989 Directory of Religious Broadcasting as featuring a contemporary Christian music format.

Sometime in the mid to late 1990s, WGMO upgraded its facility from 2.4kW at 508ft. to 7.1kW at 512ft.

In 1998, the M Street Journal reported that WGMO had changed its format from Christian programming to ABCs syndicated adult standards service, Stardust.

In 1999, Mike Oberg and George Manus of Zoe Communications, Inc. began operating WGMO, and sister station WCSW (now WXNK), under an LMA-to-buy agreement with Lutz. Under Zoe's leadership, WGMO would flip to its current classic rock format. The two stations would sell for $800,000.

In 2007, in a coordinated city-of-license move, WGMO would change its city-of-license from Shell Lake to Spooner, while sister station WPLT would change its city-of-license from Spooner to Sarona. The reason for these changes stemmed from WPLTs re-location (which required a city of license change) from a facility just southwest of the city of Spooner to WGMOs facility just southwest of the city of Shell Lake. Spooner, unlike Shell Lake (who already has the then-WCSW), did not have any other broadcast licenses assigned to it aside from WPLT, meaning that WPLTs move could not be completed unless another station could be assigned or re-assigned to Spooner.

== HD Radio ==
WGMO broadcasts in HD Radio (digital). Its HD2 subchannel carries a classic hits format known as "Rice Lake's 94.7 The River". WGMO-HD3 formerly broadcast an oldies format. However, in 2017, WGMO-HD3 and translator station W228BQ 93.5 FM began simulcasting WXCX in Siren.
