= Acuity =

Acuity may refer to:

== Biology and medicine ==
- Visual acuity, the behavioral ability to resolve fine image detail
- Tactile acuity, resolving fine spatial details with the sense of touch
- Care acuity (also referred to as patient acuity), a measure of the intensity and complexity of healthcare services required by an individual
- Acute Catheterization and Urgent Intervention Triage Strategy (ACUITY)

== Businesses ==
- Acuity Brands, an American lighting and building management firm
- Acuity Insurance, an American insurer

== Ships ==
- MV Acuity (or Tedship), a British tanker coaster
