= WLDY =

- Ladysmith, Wisconsin; United States
- Frequency: 1340 kHz
- Branding: Willie 1340

Programming
- Format: Classic country
- Affiliations: Westwood One

Ownership
- Owner: Michael Oberg and George Manus; (Zoe Communications Inc)
- Sister stations: WJBL

History
- First air date: September 1948

Technical information
- Licensing authority: FCC
- Facility ID: 21696
- Class: C
- Power: 1,000 watts unlimited
- Transmitter coordinates: 45°27′59.00″N 91°7′23.00″W

Links
- Public license information: Public file; LMS

WLDY (1340 AM, "Willie 1340") is a radio station broadcasting a classic country format. Licensed to Ladysmith, Wisconsin, United States, the station is currently owned by Michael Oberg and George Manus, through licensee Zoe Communications Inc.

== History ==
WLDY was under development by 1947. In September of that year, Broadcasting reported that the FCC had granted WLDY, then under construction at Ladysmith, a modification of its construction permit approving its antenna, transmitter and studio locations. The 1948 Radio Annual listed WLDY as a construction permit on 1340 kHz with 100 watts, owned and operated by O. J. Falge, with a business address on Highway 8. The same listing named Loren F. Bridges as general, commercial and promotion manager and program director, and Darrell H. Holbrook as chief engineer. By September 20, 1948, Broadcasting reported that Frederic W. Ziv Co. had contracted six transcribed programs for WLDY, including Favorite Story, Barry Wood, Wayne King, Sincerely Kenny Baker, Korn Kobblers and Boston Blackie.

In 1949, Broadcasting reported an application to assign WLDY's license from Falge to Flambeau Broadcasting Co. The new company was led by Falge, who held 65 percent of the firm and served as president. Other shareholders included Mark Bell, publisher of the Ladysmith News; WLDY chief engineer Darrell W. Holbrook; B. J. Nestelle; and theater-chain owner George E. Miner. The same item listed WLDY as operating on 1340 kHz with 250 watts.

WLDY also served as a local-service station in its early years. In 1952, Broadcasting reported that the station raised $2,800 for the polio fund through a marathon auction of 269 merchant-donated items. The broadcast included staffer Jeff Evans speaking for five and a half hours during the fundraiser.

The FCC granted a transfer of control of Flambeau Broadcasting in December 1953 to M & N Broadcasting Co., owner of WIGM in Medford and WPFP in Park Falls, through a $50,000 sale of all stock. The principals of M & N were Charles H. Nelson, Lucie Spence Murphy, Harold R. Murphy and Harvey J. Kitz. In 1955, the FCC granted another transfer in which Harold R. Murphy acquired Nelson's stock in M & N, while Nelson relinquished his M & N interest and became sole owner of WLDY through Flambeau Broadcasting.

WLDY's owners pursued FM service for Ladysmith during the 1960s. In 1966, Flambeau Broadcasting, identified as licensee of WLDY, petitioned the FCC to assign Channel 225 to Ladysmith. The filing argued that Ladysmith, the Rusk County seat, was too distant from larger radio markets such as Eau Claire and Duluth-Superior and needed a higher-powered FM assignment to serve smaller outlying communities. In 1967, Flambeau applied for a new FM station on 92.9 MHz with 33,000 watts and an antenna height of 131 feet above average terrain; the application listed Charles H. Nelson as 99 percent owner and Ottmar J. Falge as 1 percent owner. The FCC granted that application in 1968.

A later FM grant was issued to Flambeau Broadcasting in 1982 for a station on 92.7 MHz with 3,000 watts and an antenna height of 300 feet above average terrain. The principal listed was Ruth Nelson, who was also identified as owner of WLDY. By the late 1990s, WLDY operated as part of an AM-FM combination with WJBL-FM. In 1997, Radio Business Report reported a $450,000 stock sale of Flambeau Broadcasting Co., owner of WLDY-AM and WJBL-FM, from Gary R. Johnson and Bernice C. Beyer to Randy Hudzinski. The deal included $270,000 for the stock and separate non-compete payments to the sellers.

By 2012, FCC records listed Roth Broadcasting, Inc. as the licensee of WLDY in a license-renewal application. In 2013, the FCC granted an involuntary transfer of control of Roth Broadcasting from David and Sandra Roth to Randy Hudzinski, acting as receiver for Roth Broadcasting. The same FCC action also covered WJBL.

In 2020, Zoe Communications agreed to purchase WLDY and WJBL from Flambeau Broadcasting for $100,000. At the time of the deal, NorthPine reported that WLDY was a 1,000-watt CBS Sports Radio affiliate and that Zoe was already operating the stations under a local marketing agreement. The FCC granted the assignment of WLDY's license from Flambeau Broadcasting Co., Inc. to Zoe Communications Inc. on December 9, 2020.

In February 2021, NorthPine reported that WLDY had changed from CBS Sports Radio to classic country as "Willie" following the sale to Zoe Communications. The "Willie" format was also used on other Zoe-owned stations in northwestern Wisconsin. FCC-derived station data identifies WLDY as a Class C AM station on 1340 kHz, operating with 1,000 watts unlimited and licensed to Zoe Communications Inc.
