= Rice Lake station (Wisconsin) =

- Chicago, St. Paul, Minneapolis and Omaha Railroad Passenger Station
- U.S. National Register of Historic Places
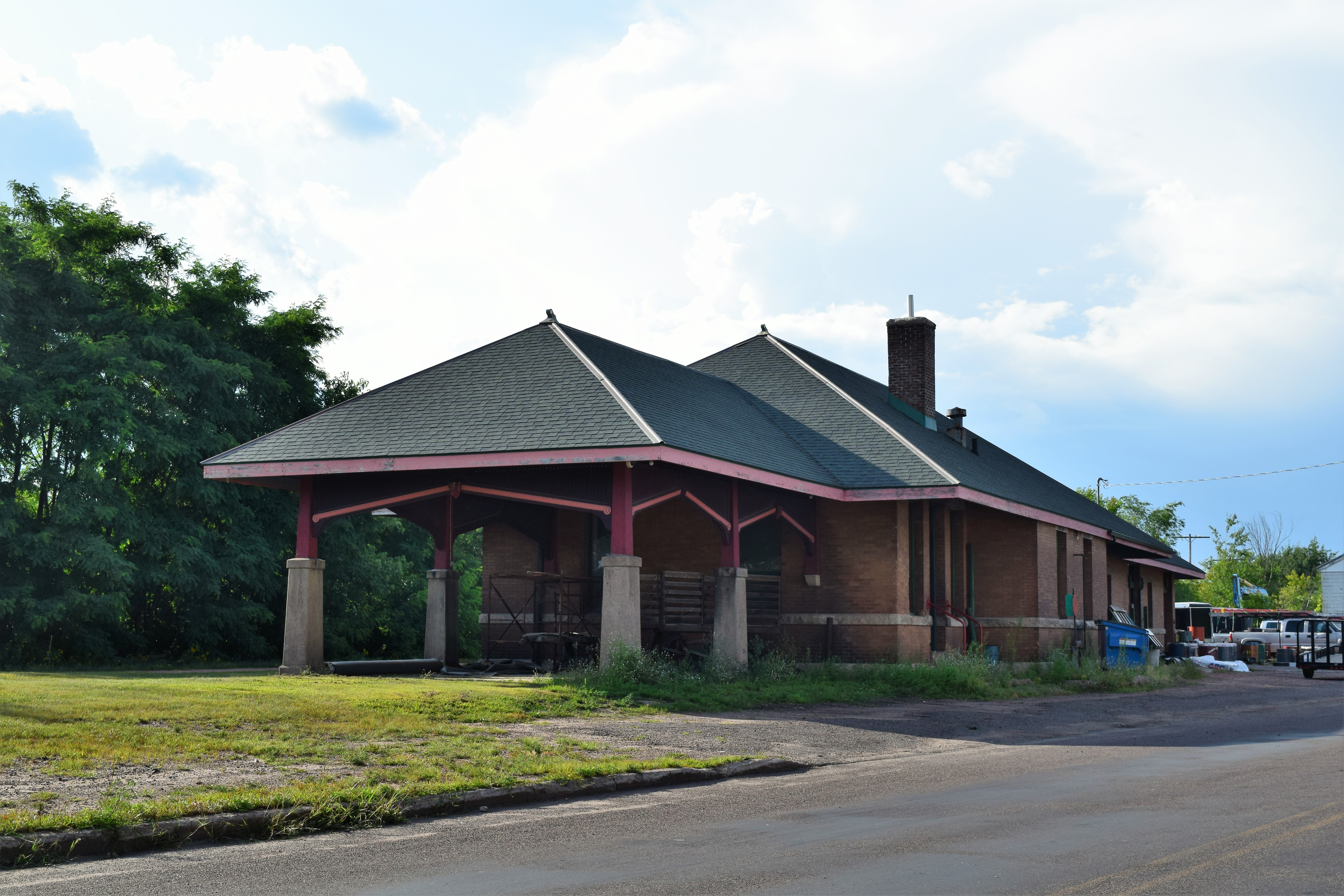

- Location within Wisconsin Location within the United States
- Location: 426 Tainter Ave., Rice Lake, Wisconsin
- Coordinates: 45°30′21″N 91°44′19″W
- Area: less than one acre
- Built: 1909
- Architect: Padley, Horace P.
- Architectural style: Prairie School
- NRHP reference No.: 07000588
- Added to NRHP: June 21, 2007

The Chicago, St. Paul, Minneapolis and Omaha Railroad Passenger Station is a former train station located in Rice Lake, Wisconsin. It was added to the National Register of Historic Places in 2007.

== History ==
The Chicago, St. Paul, Minneapolis and Omaha Railroad Passenger Station was built in 1909, replacing and an earlier station. It was operated by The Omaha Road until 1957, when the line was leased by the Chicago and North Western Transportation Company. The station closed in 1979.

Preceding station	Chicago and North Western Railway	Following station
Tuscobia toward Spooner	Eau Claire-Spooner	Cameron toward Eau Claire
