= Northwood Technical College =

Public two-year college in Wisconsin, U.S.

Coordinates: 45°28′53″N 91°44′49″W

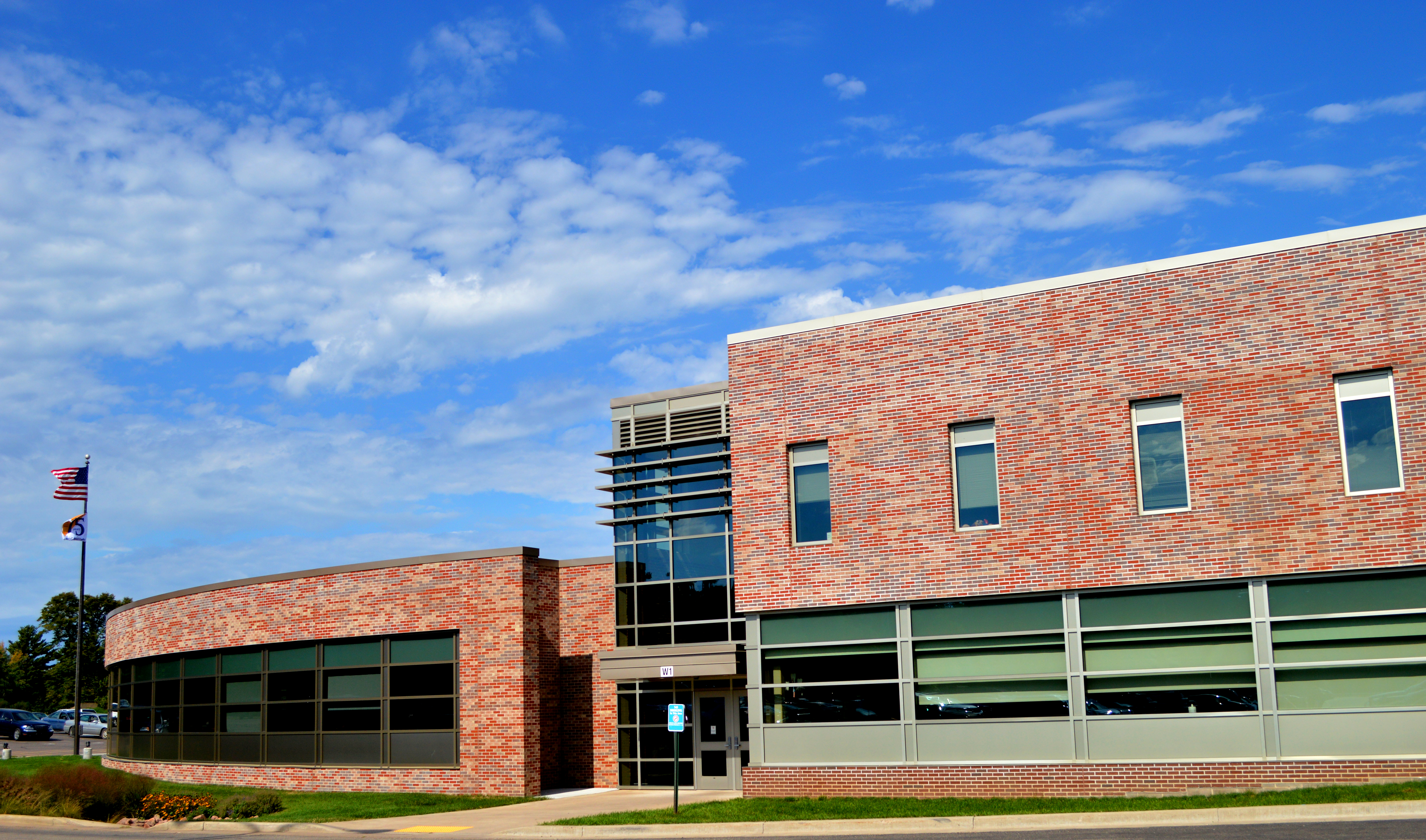
Rice Lake campus

Northwood Technical College (formerly known as Wisconsin Indianhead Technical College or WITC) is a public technical college with campuses in Ashland, New Richmond, Rice Lake and Superior, Wisconsin. There are also outreach centers in Balsam Lake, Hayward and Ladysmith and Shell Lake.

The college offers more than 100 degrees, diplomas and certificates.
