= Warren D. Leary =

American politician and newspaper editor

Warren D. Leary, Sr. (December 3, 1891 – May 19, 1959) was an American politician and newspaper editor.

Born in Elmira, New York, Leary served in the United States Army during World War I and World War II and was the inspector general of the 32nd Division. He received his bachelor's degree from Columbia University School of Journalism, where he was a member of Sigma Chi, and also attended the University of Grenoble. Leary worked for the New York Herald and the New York Tribune. He was also editor of Le Digesteur in Quebec and the Chippewa Falls Gazette. He was part owner, publisher, and manager of the Rice Lake Chronotype in Rice Lake, Wisconsin. In 1933, Leary served in the Wisconsin State Assembly and was a Democrat. He died in Rice Lake, Wisconsin in 1959.
