= Kapp Rasmussen =

American politician

Kapp Erasmus Rasmussen (October 17, 1860 – September 22, 1927) was an American lawyer and politician.

Rasmussen was born in Denmark and emigrated to the United States in 1867. He eventually settled in Rice Lake, Wisconsin. He studied law and was admitted to the Wisconsin bar in 1884. He served as the Rice Lake City Attorney. Rasmussen served in the Wisconsin Assembly from 1899 to 1903 and was a Republican. Rasmussen died from heart problems in Rice Lake, Wisconsin.
