= WPLT (FM) =

Country music radio station in Sarona, Wisconsin

- Sarona, Wisconsin; United States
- Broadcast area: Rice Lake, Wisconsin
- Frequency: 106.3 MHz
- RDS: PS: KING
- Branding: King Country 106-3

Programming
- Format: Country

Ownership
- Owner: Zoe Communications,, Inc.
- Sister stations: WXNK, WGMO, WZEZ, WXCX

History
- First air date: 2003
- Call sign meaning: PLaneT (former branding)

Technical information
- Licensing authority: FCC
- Facility ID: 5039
- Class: A
- ERP: 3,400 watts
- HAAT: 134 meters (440 ft)
- Transmitter coordinates: 45°40′28.00″N 91°58′52.00″W

Links
- Public license information: Public file; LMS
- Webcast: Listen Live
- Website: king1063.com

WPLT (106.3 MHz; "King Country") is an FM radio station broadcasting a country music format. Licensed to Sarona, Wisconsin, United States. The station is owned by Zoe Communications.

== History ==
The station’s journey began on August 10, 2000, when it received its original construction permit from the Federal Communications Commission. The WPLT call sign was officially assigned on June 15, 2001, and the station signed on the air in late 2003 after receiving its license to cover on November 12. Early in its history, the station utilized a branding of "106.3 The Planet" (playing on its call letters) positioning itself as "Today's Best Mix", before eventually transitioning to a country music format.

WPLT is owned and operated by Zoe Communications, Inc., which is based in Shell Lake, Wisconsin. The station currently broadcasts a country music format branded as "King Country 106.3." Unlike several of its sister stations in the Zoe cluster that were sold to Civic Media in recent years, WPLT remains under the ownership of Zoe Communications, led by Mike Oberg.

WPLT uses a directional antenna to prevent interference to short spaced WEVR-FM.

WPLT is a former call sign of what is now WDVD 96.3 FM in Detroit, Michigan.
