= Quest CE =

- Formerly: Newport Financial Consultants
- Company type: Private
- Industry: Software
- Founded: 1986; 40 years ago
- Founder: Alan Krenke; Linda Mieth-Krenke
- Headquarters: Milwaukee
- Area served: United States
- Revenue: US$ 4.5 million (2010)
- Divisions: Continuing Education, Compliance Training and Tracking
- Website: www.questce.com

Quest CE is a privately held company in the United States that specializes in providing compliance training and continuing education to the financial services industry.

== History ==
Quest CE was founded in 1986 in Newport Beach, California and was formerly known as Newport Financial Consultants, LLC (NFC Consulting Group). In 1994 Talbot Financial purchased NFC Consulting Group and relocated the company to Wacker Drive in Chicago, Illinois, enhancing Talbot Financial's product development capabilities.

In 2004 NFC Consulting Group was sold to the Academy of Financial Services, LLC of Milwaukee, Wisconsin. In July 2005 the company was sold to Alan Krenke formerly of Strong Financial Corp and Linda Krenke.

== Industry achievements ==
- Quest CE was selected by Great Places to Work and Fortune as one of the 100 Best Workplaces for Women, ranking #20 overall.
- Quest CE’s Branch Audit Management Platform was honored with a GRC Innovation Award in the User Interface and Experience Category by GRC analyst firm GRC 20/20.
- In 2015, the company was named one of Milwaukee’s Best and Brightest Companies to Work For.
- Quest CE was selected as one of the country’s best employers in 2015, ranking #1 on the Great Rated! People’s Picks: 20 Great Workplaces in Financial Services in the Small/Medium Business category.
- Honored as one of the Fastest Growing Firms in the Southeastern Wisconsin region by the Milwaukee Business Journal in 2014.
- Named a Metropolitan Milwaukee Association of Commerce (MMAC) 2011, 2013 and 2014 "Future 50" award winner.
- Received "Best Workplace in Milwaukee" award from The Business Journal of Milwaukee in 2010.
- Honored by Governor Scott Walker earning the Silver Award Level in the Governor's Worksite Wellness Award
