= Nation Consulting =

Nation Consulting is a consulting firm based in Milwaukee, Wisconsin, United States, that offers services to business, non-profit and political clients. The firm's services include strategic consulting and planning, media relations and governmental relations.

== History ==
Nation Consulting was founded in 2003 by Thad Nation, now a senior partner in the firm.

== Clients ==
Nation Consulting is also involved in regional and statewide economic issues, including consultation work with the New North, an economic development group promoting the 18 counties in northeastern Wisconsin. The firm also provides business consulting, non-profit development and management, and is involved in select advocacy issues, including voter rights and technology access.

The firm's client list includes Wisconsin Energy Corporation, HJ Martin and Son, Pabst Farms and others. The firm also has provided campaign management to a variety of political campaigns, primarily Wisconsin based. Nation Consulting also manages non-profit entities, including Wired Wisconsin, a non-profit coalition of individuals, businesses and organizations that aims to promote technological industries in Wisconsin.
