= WXNK =

- Shell Lake, Wisconsin; United States
- Broadcast area: Rice Lake, Wisconsin
- Frequency: 940 kHz
- Branding: Ink 92.7 (main); The Ink (secondary)

Programming
- Format: Active rock

Ownership
- Owner: Zoe Communications, Inc.
- Sister stations: WGMO, WPLT, WZEZ (FM)

History
- First air date: December 30, 1967 (as WCSW)
- Former call signs: WCSW (1967–2018)
- Call sign meaning: INK

Technical information
- Licensing authority: FCC
- Facility ID: 10532
- Class: D
- Power: 1,000 watts day
- Transmitter coordinates: 45°41′36.00″N 91°57′57.00″W
- Translator: 92.7 W224DN (Shell Lake)

Links
- Public license information: Public file; LMS
- Webcast: Listen live
- Website: ink927.com

WXNK (940 AM) is a radio station broadcasting an active rock format. Licensed to Shell Lake, Wisconsin, United States, the station is currently owned by Zoe Communications, Inc.

== History ==
WXNK traces its history to WCSW, an AM station authorized for Shell Lake in the late 1960s. Broadcasting reported in December 1967 that the WCSW call letters had been granted to Charles Lutz and Erwin Gladdenbegk of Shell Lake. A January 1968 FCC-actions notice in Broadcasting still listed WCSW as a construction-permit-only station when it received presunrise service authority for 940 kHz at 500 watts.

Lutz became sole owner in 1970, when the FCC granted assignment of Gladdenbegk's 50-percent interest in WCSW to Lutz for $56,000. By 1971, Lutz was identified as the licensee of WCSW, operating on 940 kHz with 1,000 watts daytime from Shell Lake. Lutz later expanded his Shell Lake broadcast holdings; in 1976, Broadcasting reported that Gladdenbegk sought to assign WKCF(FM) on 95.3 MHz in Shell Lake to Lutz for $60,000, noting that Lutz owned WCSW and had other local business interests.

By the late 1990s, WCSW's programming was shifting. The M Street Journal listed WCSW as a soft adult contemporary station in March 1997. In September 1999, NorthPine reported that sister station WGMO had dropped ABC's "Stardust" nostalgia format for classic rock, while the nostalgia format moved to WCSW, replacing ABC's Real Country service. The M Street Journal similarly reported that WCSW moved from ABC Real Country to ABC standards and talk, and that WCSW and WGMO had entered a local marketing agreement with Zoe Communications. Radio Business Report later reported the sale of WCSW and WGMO from Charles R. Lutz to Zoe Communications, headed by George Manus and Michael Oberg, for $800,000; the report stated that Zoe had operated the stations under an LMA since September 1, 1999.

WCSW continued moving toward talk programming after the Zoe sale. In January 2000, NorthPine reported that WCSW had added Dr. Laura and had become "mostly Talk" the previous month, with a lineup including Dr. Laura, Rush Limbaugh, Paul Harvey, local news, and some locally originated nostalgia programming. The same report noted that WCSW was a daytime-only station.

The station was relaunched in 2018 around an FM translator. The FCC listed a June 1, 2018 call-sign change from WCSW to WXNK. NorthPine reported that new translator W224DN on 92.7 MHz had signed on from Shell Lake with a hard rock format branded "Ink 92.7", originating from WXNK. The report described WXNK as the former conservative talk WCSW and said W224DN had been granted to Zoe Communications through the FCC's AM Revitalization translator filing windows.

In 2020, Zoe expanded the "Ink" format to WXCE in Amery and its translator W297CU, while NorthPine noted that the format had originally launched about two years earlier on WXNK and W224DN. WXNK also faced a prolonged technical reduction after a 2019 brush-clearing accident by a utility company damaged its tower and facilities. In 2022, NorthPine reported that Zoe had requested an extension of special temporary authority for WXNK to operate at 50 watts, rather than its licensed 1,000-watt daytime power, while preparing a modification application.

As of Nielsen Audio's Spring 2026 station profile, WXNK was listed as "INK" on 940 AM, licensed to Shell Lake in Washburn County, with an active rock format and independent network status.
