= Spancrete =

Manufacturer of concrete products

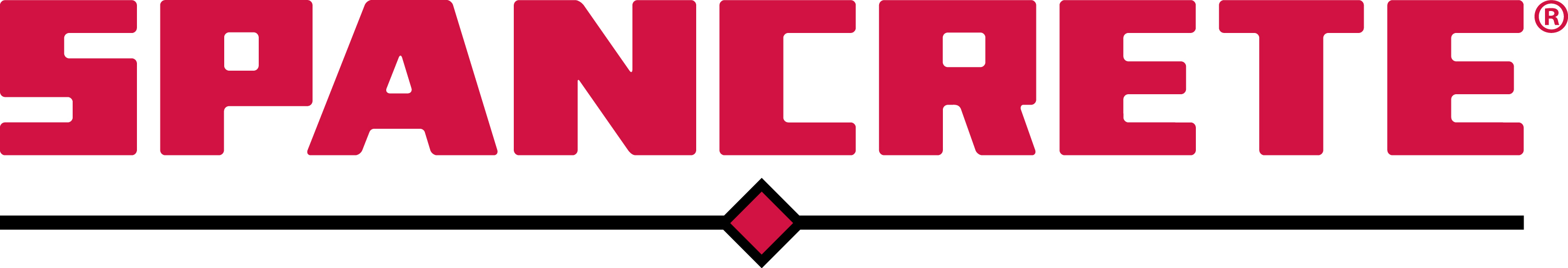
- Company type: Private
- Industry: Concrete
- Founded: 1946
- Founder: Henry Nagy
- Headquarters: Waukesha, Wisconsin, United States
- Key people: John Nagy (CEO)
- Website: www.spancrete.com

Spancrete is an American manufacturer of precast concrete products and machinery. Spancrete produces precast, prestressed concrete products that are used in commercial, industrial, institutional, residential and multifamily construction projects in the Midwest and Southeast. The company also manufactures and sells hollowcore extrusion machines that are used to produce precast concrete internationally.

== History ==
=== West Allis Concrete Products ===
In 1946, Henry Nagy and his brother-in-law, Arthur Hintz, founded the West Allis Concrete Products company in West Allis, Wisconsin. The concrete block manufacturer thrived in the rapidly growing post-World War II economy, manufacturing as many as 1,000 concrete blocks each day.

By 1951, West Allis Concrete Products was receiving high-quantity orders to supply concrete block for Milwaukee County Stadium, Wisconsin State Fair Park, and Kohl's Department Stores, as well as new risers for Comiskey Park. The company had grown so large that it required expansion, and it did so by purchasing Genesee Sand and Gravel Company and the Farchione Block Company.

In 1953, Nagy traveled to Germany to examine a unique precast concrete manufacturing machine called a Hollowcore extruder. Though damaged by a World War II bomb, Nagy purchased the extruder and its patents and brought them back to the United States.

When the extruder was brought back to the U.S., Nagy repaired the machine and began making prestressed, precast hollowcore concrete slabs. Nagy referred to the slabs as, "Spancrete."

== Corporate Structure ==
=== Divisions ===
==== Spancrete Precast Products ====
Spancrete manufactures a variety of architectural and structural precast products, including hollowcore plank, wall panels, beams, columns, double tees, risers, balconies and landings, bridge girders, sound walls, and stairs.

==== Spancrete Global Services ====
Spancrete Global Services is the division of Spancrete responsible for the manufacture and sales of Spancrete machines. Until January 2012, the machinery division was its own corporation known as Spancrete Machinery Corporation. Spancrete Global Services sells and services Spancrete machinery customers in the United States and abroad. Internationally, Spancrete machines are used in Russia, Spain, Japan, Egypt, Korea, China, Australia, Turkey, Mexico, Israel, Trinidad, Denmark, Germany, and Switzerland.

=== Subsidiaries ===
==== Florida Precast Industries, Inc. ====
In March 2007, Spancrete purchased Florida Precast Industries, Inc. The company, based in Sebring, Florida, produces precast concrete products for residential, multifamily, commercial, industrial, and institutional applications.

==== Spancrete Manufacturers Association ====
The Spancrete Manufacturers Association is an alliance of corporations that own Spancrete machines and produce precast, prestressed concrete. The group was formed in 1960 to promote the use of precast, prestressed concrete products and building systems worldwide.

== Examples ==
Spancrete precast products have been used in the construction of the following, well-known structures and infrastructures:

- Miller Park
- Bradley Center
- Froedtert Hospital
- Marquette Interchange
- University of Wisconsin-Madison
- U.S. 41
