= Spot Filmworks =

Spot Filmworks is a privately owned production company headquartered in Madison, Wisconsin that specializes in producing broadcast, interactive, and branded content work.

The production company's client list includes work for Miller Brewing Company, Canon Asia, AstraZeneca, Jimmy John's Gourmet Sandwiches, Dow AgroSciences, Trek Bicycle Corporation, Johnson & Johnson Healthcare, Wisconsin Tourism, Dremel, Mayo Health System, Alzheimer's Association, and Harley-Davidson.

Their work has been featured in Communication Arts, Shoot, Screen Magazine and InCamera.

Spot Filmworks currently represents three directors – Michael Graf, Jay Torres, and Chris Neil – who reside in the Midwest and West Coast and work throughout the United States. The three directors are known for their directorial style in artful storytelling, healthcare, comedy, effects, and children.

== History ==
Spot Filmworks was incorporated in 1994. In 2000 they became the first production company in Wisconsin to become a member of the Association of Independent Commercial Producers (AICP).

== Awards ==
Spot Filmworks has won numerous awards for their work in commercial production and scriptwriting, including:

- Emmy Award for Best Public Service Announcement
- AdCritic.com Top 10 list of best commercials worldwide
- Graf was named Director Of The Year by Screen magazine
- American Advertising Federation Mosaic Award for Diversity in Advertising
- International Summit Creative Awards Best of Show
- Silver WorldMedal at New York Festivals
- CINE Golden Eagle Award
- Mobius Award
- Worldfest-Houston International Film Festival Gold Award
- Over 30 National Telly Awards
