= Rice Lake Weighing Systems =

Rice Lake Weighing Systems is an American multinational industrial scale manufacturer headquartered in Rice Lake, Wisconsin. An ISO 9001 certified company, Rice Lake Weighing Systems manufactures industrial scale and process-control equipment for a variety of industries including agriculture, food and beverage processing, forestry, pharmaceuticals, retail, transportation, logistics and waste.

== History ==
In 1945, Donald B. Johnson and Warren Thomas founded Thomas & Johnson Scale Service in St. Paul, Minnesota. In 1946, they moved to Rice Lake, WI; an area with a high demand for scale service due to the dairies, creameries and railroads. Thomas & Johnson Scale Service became Rice Lake Bearing Inc. in 1971, as the company began to offer refurbishing services for pivots and bearings. In 1981, Donald B. and his son Mark became sole owners of the company. In 1986, the company changed its name to Rice Lake Weighing Systems. Today, Rice Lake Weighing Systems is the largest employer in the city of Rice Lake, WI with over 600 employees

== Locations ==
The Rice Lake Weighing Systems corporate headquarters, primary manufacturing facility and NVLAP accredited metrology lab are located in Rice Lake, Wisconsin.

=== Jasper, Alabama ===
Rice Lake Weighing Systems acquired Powell Scale in 2005. The facility in Jasper is used for an expansion of the manufacturing of truck scales and other heavy-capacity products.

=== Fernley, Nevada ===
The Fernley facility was established in 2011 as a west coast manufacturing facility for truck scales and other heavy-capacity products.

=== Kent, Washington ===
Rice Lake Weighing Systems acquired Measurement Systems International in 2012. The Seattle facility manufactures industrial electronic scales, crane scales, tension dynamometers and other load monitoring instrumentation.

=== Monterrey, Mexico ===
Rice Lake de Mexico provides sales, service and training support to Latin America.

=== Heteren, Netherlands ===
Rice Lake Weighing Systems acquired the Dutch belt-scale manufacturer Master Engineering in 2013. Rice Lake Weighing Systems Europe B.V. provides distribution and support of Rice Lake products for their European customer base.

=== Chennai, India ===
Rice Lake Weighing Systems India Ltd. Is a joint venture between Rice Lake Weighing Systems and Strategic Weighing Systems Limited. Products include electronic weighing systems, material handling systems and batching and blending solutions.

=== Sao Paulo, Brazil ===
Rice Lake Weighing systems and Fefa Sensores have developed a distribution agreement to deliver product and customer service to the Brazilian marketplace through local service, warehousing and support in São Paulo, Brazil.

=== Other Divisions ===
Other divisions of Rice Lake Weighing Systems include Mattson Spray Equipment, Rice Lake Custom Machining and Intruder.

== Training Programs ==
=== Welding Program ===
Rice Lake Weighing Systems was awarded a $78,795 grant from the Department of Workforce Development to develop a multi-level welding skills program . This program provides training and skill enhancement to 53 incumbent workers and 38 new hires at the company.

=== Intern Program ===
Rice Lake Weighing Systems has the largest Summer Internship program in the region, hosting 40 to 60 high school and college students each year. Interns work in a variety of fields from maintenance to marketing and HR.
