= Western States Envelope & Label =

Western States - Envelopes, Labels & Packaging
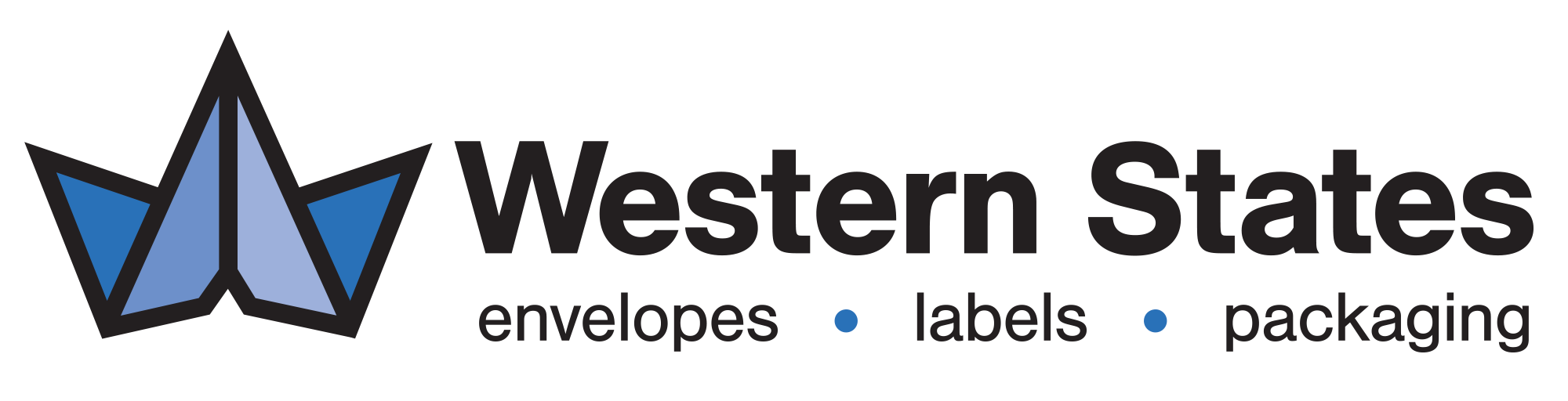
- Company type: Private
- Founded: 1908
- Headquarters: Butler, Wisconsin
- Products: Envelopes, Envelope converting, Labels, Packaging, Business Products and Services for printers, mailers, distributors and office suppliers
- Number of employees: 565 (2018)
- Website: https://www.wsel.com/

Western States Envelope & Label is a wholesale envelope and label manufacturer for the printing, distributing, mailing, and office supply trades. Western States has five full-service manufacturing facilities in the United States, with the corporate headquarters in Butler, WI.

== History ==
=== Beginning ===
Western States opened its doors in 1908, after visionary George French Moss discovered the need for a reliable envelope supplier for printers in the Milwaukee area. Moss founded the company and first opened it in downtown Milwaukee, Wisconsin.

=== Expansion ===
In the years that followed, Western States grew substantially. The company developed several different patents for its machinery and techniques, along with being a pioneer in the process of printing envelopes before they were folded, which is still widely used today. In 1965, the company moved to a new location in Butler, Wisconsin, which is still its corporate headquarters today. To meet growing demand, the company purchased two new manufacturing facilities in Erlanger, Kentucky and Walbridge, Ohio in 1978-1979. It expanded the Butler facility in 1995. In 1999, Western States purchased another two manufacturing facilities, an envelope company in Vadnais Heights, Minnesota and a label company in Madison, Wisconsin.

=== Recent years ===
The company's success has led them to the rank of the 4th largest envelope manufacturer in the U.S. in 2002, by producing more than 14 million envelopes daily. The company also celebrated 100 years of business in 2008. In 2009, the company built a new state-of-the-art label facility in Sun Prairie, Wisconsin, and moved all of its Madison operations to the new building to meet the growing demand for label sales.

== Divisions ==
- Butler, Wisconsin - Corporate Headquarters
- Erlanger, Kentucky - Manufacturing Facility
- Toledo, Ohio - Manufacturing Facility
- Vadnais Heights, Minnesota - Manufacturing Facility
- Sun Prairie, Wisconsin - Label Facility
