= WJMC (AM) =

- Rice Lake, Wisconsin; United States
- Broadcast area: Rice Lake-Spooner
- Frequency: 1240 kHz
- Branding: 1240 WJMC

Programming
- Format: MOR/News/Talk
- Affiliations: Fox News Radio; Premiere Networks; Milwaukee Brewers Radio Network; Milwaukee Bucks Radio Network

Ownership
- Owner: TKC, Inc.
- Sister stations: WJMC-FM, WAQE (AM), WAQE-FM, WKFX

History
- First air date: 1938
- Call sign meaning: Walter and James MCGenty (station founders)

Technical information
- Licensing authority: FCC
- Facility ID: 67196
- Class: C
- Power: 1,000 watts unlimited
- Transmitter coordinates: 45°30′31.00″N 91°46′26.00″W
- Translator: 96.5 W243ED (Rice Lake)

Links
- Public license information: Public file; LMS
- Webcast: Listen Live
- Website: wjmcradio.com

WJMC (1240 kHz) is an AM radio station broadcasting a full-service format of middle of the road music, news, and talk. Licensed to Rice Lake, Wisconsin, United States, the station serves the Rice Lake-Spooner area. The station is currently owned by TKC, Inc. and features programming from Premiere Networks. The station serves as a primary regional affiliate for the Milwaukee Brewers, Milwaukee Bucks, and Wisconsin Badgers radio networks.

== History ==
WJMC is one of the oldest broadcast outlets in northwestern Wisconsin. The Rice Lake Chamber of Commerce describes WJMC as "the first radio station in the entire area" and says it was established by the McGenty brothers in 1938. Federal Communications Commission records dated March 7, 1939, listing stations as of January 1, 1939, show WJMC at Rice Lake as a construction permit held by Walter H. McGenty, authorized for 250 watts on 1210 kHz, daytime only. The Chippewa Valley Museum states that WJMC went on the air at 6:00 a.m. on March 15, 1939, and identifies the owners as brothers Walter and J. J. McGenty.

The station was operating on 1240 kHz by the early 1940s. A March 15, 1943, WJMC reception verification letter identified "W. H. and J. J. McGenty" as owners, listed Ralph W. Thompson as manager, gave the slogan "1240 On Your Dial", and referred to WJMC as a "250-watter". A 1944 station directory also listed WJMC at 1240 kHz with 250 watts, licensed to Walter H. McGenty.

In its early decades, WJMC operated as a broad-based community station rather than as a narrow music-format station. A University of Wisconsin source on traditional music in the Upper Midwest describes stations such as WJMC from the late 1930s through the 1950s as offering eclectic local service, including live ethnic music programs, a "barn dance" show, church services, and country, rock, pop and classical recordings. The Chippewa Valley Museum has also identified an archival image as showing a Polish Barn Dance Band broadcasting over WJMC in Rice Lake during approximately 1939 to 1945.

Walter H. McGenty sold WJMC in 1944. Broadcasting reported in January 1944 that the FCC had received an application to assign the station's license from McGenty, described as sole owner and publisher of the farm journal Stock & Dairy Farmer, to Walter C. Bridges for $17,500. The magazine said McGenty was retiring from broadcasting because of ill health and to devote more time to other business interests, while Bridges was president of WEAU in Eau Claire and secretary-treasurer of Head of the Lakes Broadcasting Company, licensee of WEBC in Duluth, WMFG in Hibbing and WHLB in Virginia, Minnesota. The FCC granted the voluntary assignment in April 1944.

During the Bridges era, WJMC was connected with a wider northern Wisconsin and Upper Midwest broadcasting group. In a 1958 FCC proceeding, WJMC was described as part of the Arrowhead Network, consisting of WJMC and five other stations, and Walter C. Bridges was described as holding a majority interest in WJMC and WHSM in Hayward. The FCC record also said Arrowhead Network stations, including WJMC, held joint meetings on programming, advertising and related policies.

By the late 1980s, WJMC and its FM sister station were owned by the Janesville Gazette printing company. Tom Koser, who had grown up in the Barron County area and had worked in radio sales and management, later recalled that the WJMC AM call letters had been in Rice Lake since 1939 and that the stations also included an underused high-power FM signal. Koser said he approached the Janesville Gazette printing company about selling the stations and purchased WJMC in 1989, making WJMC AM-FM his first two stations.

Under Koser's TKC, Inc., WJMC became the foundation of a larger local radio group. Koser later bought stations in Rhinelander in 1991, WRLS in Hayward in 1992, and stations in Escanaba, Michigan, in 1994. After the Telecommunications Act of 1996 allowed greater local ownership consolidation, Koser expanded further; in fall 1998 he bought WAQE AM-FM across town in Rice Lake and put WKFX on the air, after which the company operated as an 11-station group.

In 2023, Koser sold most of the Rice Lake cluster to Armada Media Partners. NorthPine reported in June 2023 that Armada was buying five Rice Lake stations from TKC, Inc.—WJMC-FM, WAQE-FM, WKFX, WAQE and WJMC—and that the AM stations included FM translators. The asset purchase agreement filed with the FCC listed AMC Partners Rice Lake, LLC, as buyer and a purchase price of $4.951 million. An FCC public notice dated July 12, 2023, showed the WJMC 1240 assignment application accepted for filing, with the license moving from TKC, Inc. to AMC Partners Rice Lake, LLC. The transaction closed on October 3, 2023, and included WJMC 1240 and translator W243ED at 96.5 MHz.

The station announced the transfer in September 2023, saying WJMC, WAQE and WKFX would officially move from the long-time ownership of Tom Koser and TKC, Inc. to Armada Media Partners on October 3, 2023. Former Wisconsin governor Tommy Thompson, one of Armada's owners, said the company intended to continue the locally focused programming built by Koser, while Koser retained WRLS in Hayward and remained at the Rice Lake stations in a managerial role.

WJMC currently brands its AM service with translator W243ED as WJMC 96.5 FM/1240 AM and promotes it as a local news and talk station for northwestern Wisconsin. The station's website describes WJMC as carrying local news and interviews along with talk programming, and lists AMC Partners-Rice Lake as the operator of the station group.
