= WAQE-FM =

- Barron, Wisconsin; United States
- Frequency: 97.7 MHz
- Branding: Star 97.7 WAQE

Programming
- Format: Adult contemporary
- Affiliations: CBS News Radio, Westwood One

Ownership
- Owner: AMC Partners Rice Lake, LLC.
- Sister stations: WJMC (AM), WJMC-FM, WAQE (AM), WKFX

History
- First air date: 1999
- Former call signs: WBFE (1998–1999, CP)

Technical information
- Licensing authority: FCC
- Facility ID: 85769
- Class: C3
- ERP: 10,000 watts
- HAAT: 157 meters
- Transmitter coordinates: 45°30′31.00″N 91°46′27.00″W

Links
- Public license information: Public file; LMS
- Webcast: Listen live
- Website: waqe.com

WAQE-FM (97.7 FM) is a radio station broadcasting an adult contemporary music format. It is licensed to Barron, Wisconsin, United States. The station is currently owned by TKC, Inc. and features programming from CBS News Radio and Westwood One.

In 2024, WAQE-FM relocated from the WAQE (AM) transmitter site located northwest of Rice Lake to the WJMC transmitter site co-located with the stations’ studios. With the change, WAQE-FM saw an increase in height from 289 ft. (HAAT) to 515 ft. (HAAT) and a decrease in power from 15,500 watts to 10,000 watts. WAQE-FM currently has a construction permit to upgrade its power from 10,000 to 47,000 watts using a directional antenna to protect first-adjacent 97.5 KNXR in Rochester, MN.

Christian Emory hosts the 6-11am morning show, middays with Ryan Quinn from 11am-3pm, and drive time with A.J. from 3-7pm.

== History ==
The station was assigned call sign WBFE on July 17, 1998. On November 16, 1999, the station changed its call sign to WAQE-FM.
