= WAQE (AM) =

Fox Sports Radio radio station in Rice Lake, Wisconsin-La Crescent, Minnesota

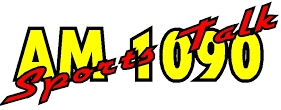
- Rice Lake, Wisconsin; United States
- Broadcast area: Rice Lake, Wisconsin
- Frequency: 1090 kHz
- Branding: Sports Talk 1090

Programming
- Format: Sports
- Affiliations: Fox Sports Radio

Ownership
- Owner: TKC, Inc.
- Sister stations: WJMC (AM), WJMC-FM, WAQE-FM, WKFX

History
- First air date: August 6, 1979
- Former call signs: WAQE (1979–1986); WMYD (1986–1992)

Technical information
- Licensing authority: FCC
- Facility ID: 55338
- Class: D
- Power: 5,000 watts daytime only
- Transmitter coordinates: 45°32′16.00″N 91°45′50.00″W
- Translator: 107.7 W299CQ (Rice Lake)

Links
- Public license information: Public file; LMS
- Website: waqe.com

WAQE (1090 AM) is a radio station broadcasting a sports format. The station is licensed to Rice Lake, Wisconsin and is owned by TKC, Inc. WAQE formerly transmitted in C-QUAM AM stereo.

== History ==
WAQE first began broadcasting on August 6, 1979. The station was established to provide a new broadcast voice for Barron County, operating on the 1090 kHz frequency. In its early years, the station utilized the C-QUAM AM stereo system to deliver a stereo signal, a technology that was a point of distinction for AM broadcasters in the 1980s. The station originally used the WAQE call sign until 1986, when it briefly became WMYD before reverting to its original identity in February 1992. For several decades, the station operated with a classic country format. However, on August 29, 2009, the station underwent a significant branding shift, adopting an all-sports format as "Sports Talk 1090". Under this format, the station became a regional affiliate for national sports syndication, carrying the full Fox Sports Radio lineup, including programs like The Dan Patrick Show and The Herd with Colin Cowherd.

The station was owned for over 30 years by Tom Koser through his company, TKC, Inc., as part of a family-run cluster that included WJMC. In October 2023, the Koser family officially transferred the station to Armada Media (via AMC Partners Rice Lake LLC) as part of a multi-station acquisition valued at approximately $4.95 million. The transition brought the station under the management of an ownership group that includes former Wisconsin Governor Tommy Thompson.

To ensure 24-hour availability of its sports programming, WAQE is simulcast on FM translator W299CQ at 107.7 MHz in Rice Lake. In 2025, the station applied to move its translator antenna to a lower position on its existing tower behind the studio facility to maintain structural compliance while continuing to relay the 1090 AM signal.
