= Acuity Insurance =

Mutual insurance company

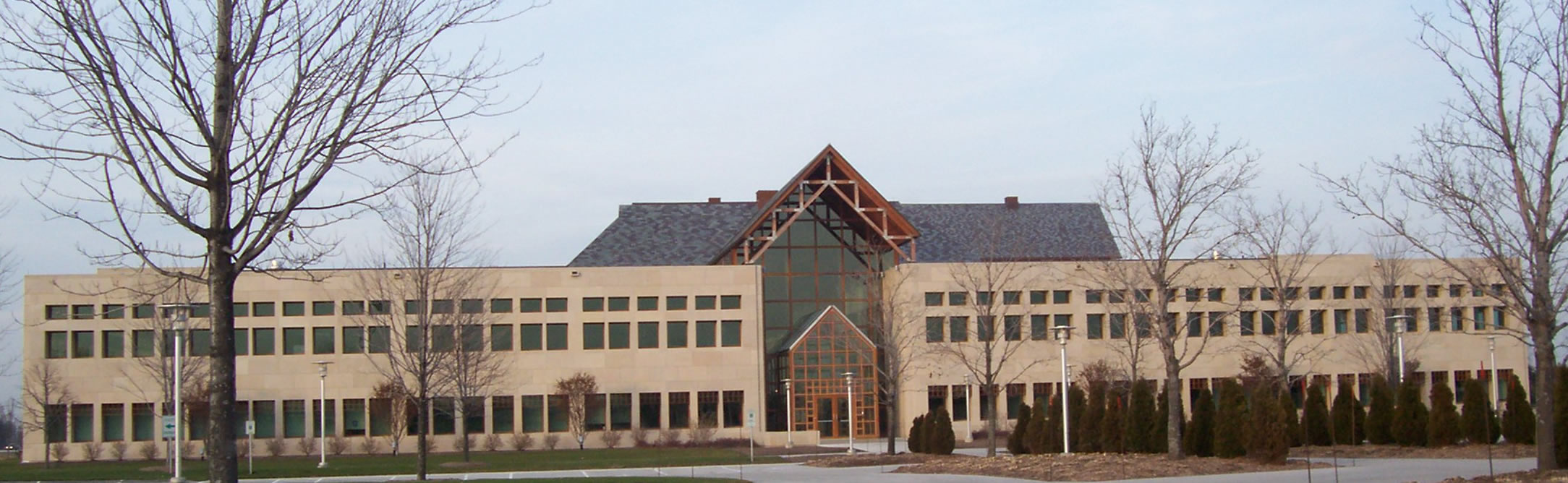
- Formerly: Heritage Mutual Insurance
- Industry: Insurance
- Founded: 1925
- Headquarters: 2800 South Taylor Drive; Sheboygan, Wisconsin
- Area served: United States (29 states)
- Key people: Melissa Winter (President, CEO)
- Net income: $241.9 million (2020)
- Total assets: $5.8 billion (2020)
- Number of employees: 1,500 (2021)
- Website: www.acuity.com

Acuity Insurance is a mutual insurance company headquartered in Sheboygan, Wisconsin.

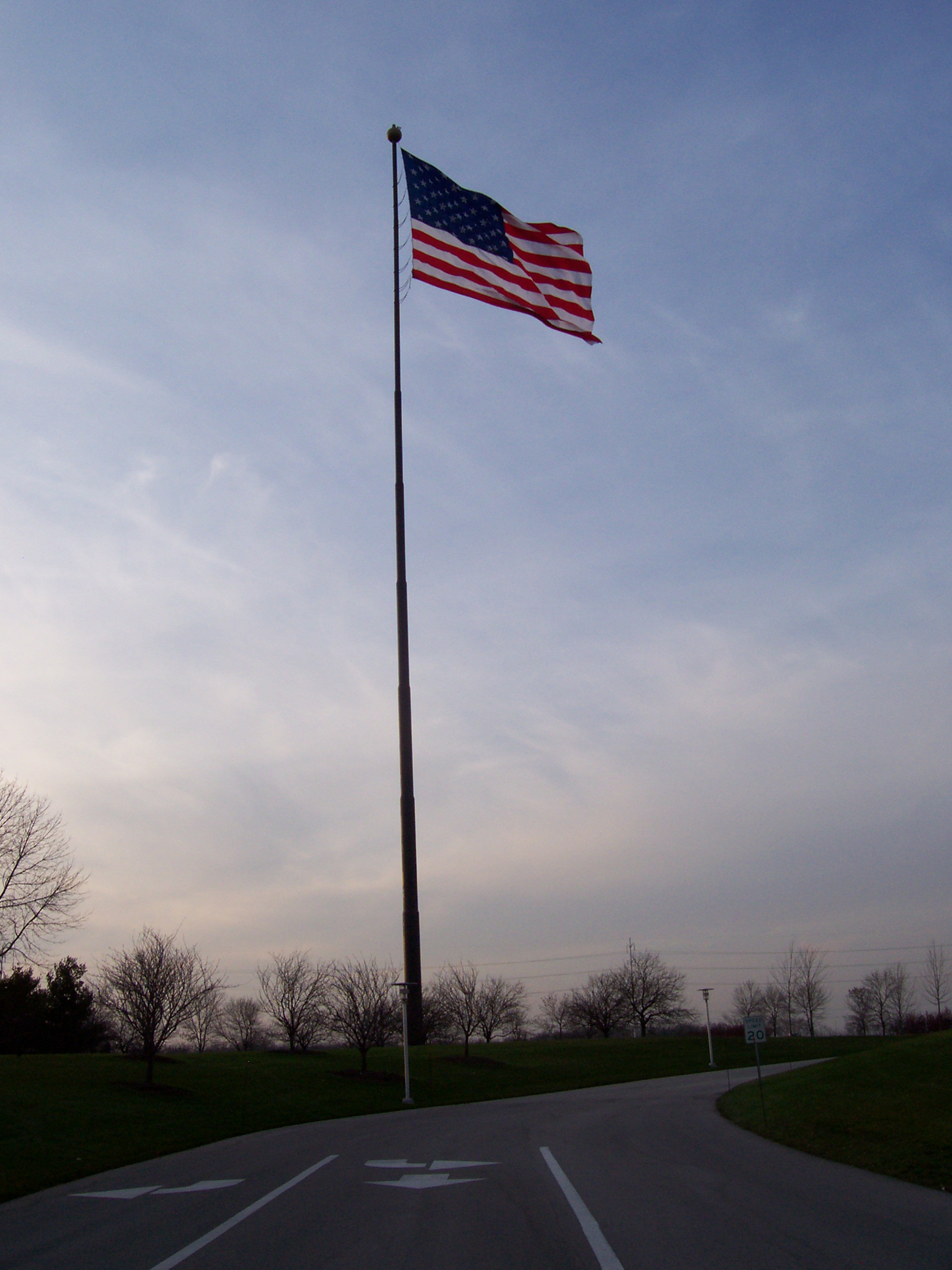
Acuity flagpole, 2006–2008 on the south side of Acuity's corporate campus. The current flagpole is placed on the north side of the campus near an artificial lake.

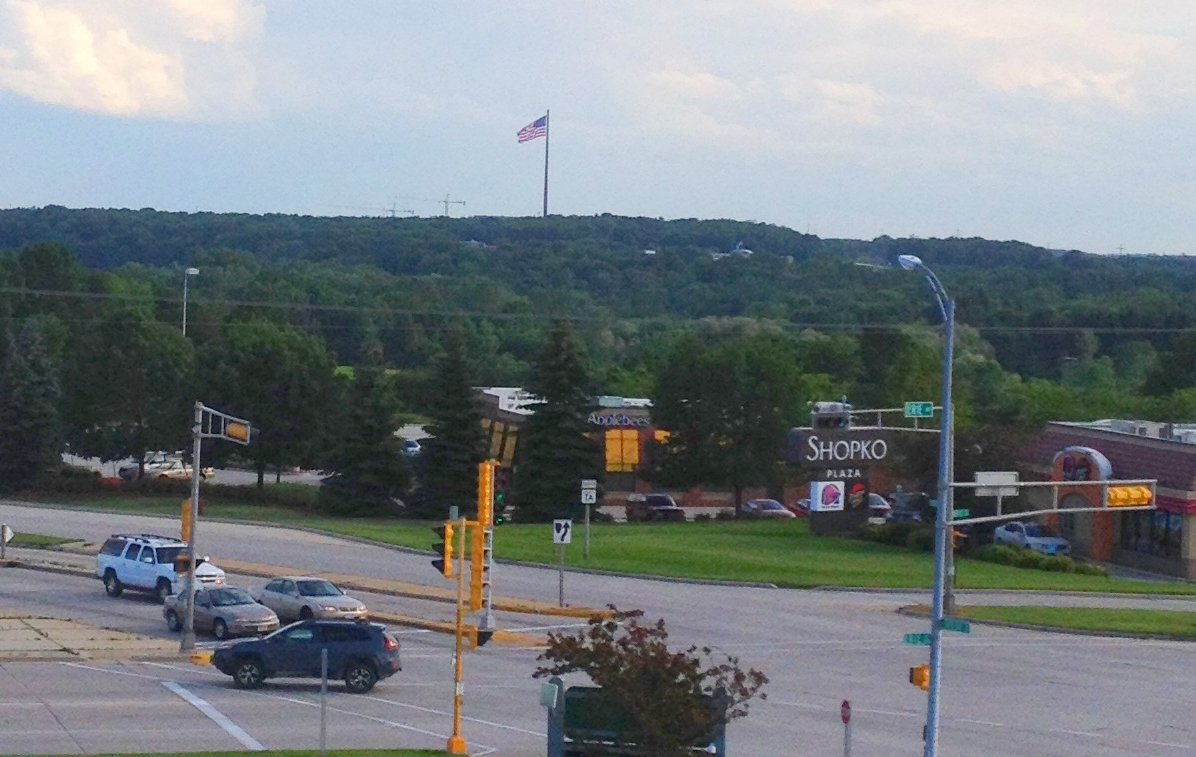
Current Acuity flagpole from Taylor Park in Sheboygan, 1.7 miles (2.7 km) north-northeast of the Acuity campus.

== Overview ==
Acuity Insurance is the 55th-largest property and casualty insurer in the United States.

The company operates in 32 states, generates over $2 billion in revenue, manages over $5.5 billion in assets, and employs nearly 2,000 people. Acuity Insurance is rated A+ (Superior) by A.M. Best and also receives an A+ rating from Standard and Poor's. In 2021, Acuity was named on Forbes America's Best Midsize Employers list, as well as being ranked by Forbes as the best employer in Wisconsin.

== History ==
=== Early years ===
In 1925, a group of farmers and small town business men from Sheboygan County came together to form the Mutual Auto Insurance Company of the Town of Herman. The formation of the company came at a time when direct writers, mutual companies that sold insurance to farmers and others in specific agricultural businesses, as well as ownership of personal automobiles, were on the rise. The next year, in 1926, William J. Prietzel became the first president and CEO of Mutual Auto Insurance, and would remain in this position for 33 years.

The 1950s would end up being a decade of many changes for the company. First, the company changed its name to Mutual Auto of Wisconsin in 1953. This name would only last for 4 years, as the company was renamed to Heritage Mutual Insurance Company in 1957.

=== The Marvin Hessler era ===
In 1959, Marvin C. Hessler was named the president and CEO of Heritage Mutual, after the sudden death of Prietzel. Hessler was the treasurer of Heritage at the time, as well as another longtime member of the company with over 25 years of involvement at the time he took up the mantle of leadership.

Hessler most notably played an important role in the company's negotiations with the Citizens Bank of Sheboygan to purchase their new corporate office. In 1960, the company finished its move to Sheboygan.

=== The John Holden era ===
In 1969, Wisconsin attorney John R. Holden became the president and CEO of Heritage Mutual. Holden was instrumental in moving Heritage's headquarters to Sheboygan's southwest side along Interstate 43, where it sits today. At the time of the company's initial move in 1979, he was quoted in The Sheboygan Press saying, "Ninety-nine percent of the people passing Sheboygan will never see the downtown, but will view it from I-43. We think what they should see is our company building and grounds … and I think it will be a favorable recollection." Heritage Mutual completed its move to its current location in 1984.

Holden served as president and CEO from 1969 to 1999. During this time, the company's written premium grew from just over $7 million to $249 million. Under his leadership, much of the groundwork for the company's later growth and expansion were set.

=== The Ben Salzmann era ===
In August 1999, Holden stepped down from the presidency. Ben Salzmann, the Vice President of Technology at the time, became the new president and CEO. The company would change its name to Acuity Insurance in 2001.

The company opened a $39 million addition to its headquarters in 2004. The addition added 262,000 square feet (24,300 m^{2}) to the facility and renovated about 20,000 square feet (2,000 m^{2}) of space.

In 2022, Acuity was named to Forbes’s Best Midsize Employers list. The company was ranked at #26 out of 500 companies on the list, a more than 400-point jump for the insurer over 2021.

==== COVID-19 ====
In 2020, the COVID-19 crisis hit the United States. When the nationwide Stay-at-Home order was given in March 2020, Acuity remained open and operational. This was thanks in due part to the company's approach on remote work technology and procedures, as well as flex hour options for employees. Throughout 2020 and 2021, Acuity would operate on a work-from-home basis, providing their employees with necessary equipment, gift cards, and other presents.

Acuity received praise for their handling of the COVID-19 crisis, with Ben Salzmann being ranked as the 8th Best CEO in the United States during the pandemic. Employees would also rank Acuity as the best company for work-life balance during COVID-19.

== Flagpoles ==
Acuity Insurance raised the tallest flagpole in the United States on July 2, 2005. The steel pole was 338 feet (103 m) high, 6 feet (1.8 m) wide at the base, weighed 65 tons (without the flag), and was sunk into a 550-cubic yard block of concrete that was 40 feet (12 m) deep, 8 feet (2.4 m) wide and reinforced by steel rods. The American flag was 120 feet (37 m) by 60 feet (18 m), or 7,200 square feet (670 m^{2}).

Each star was 3 feet (0.91 m) high and each stripe was 4 1/2 feet wide. It weighed 300 pounds (140 kg). This flag and flagpole outdid an earlier Acuity record, a flag raised June 2, 2003, atop a 150-foot (46 m) flagpole. The new flagpole was a replacement; the old pole toppled over due to stress and high winds, falling away from nearby Interstate 43. The new flagpole was designed with extra bracing and placed much farther from the highway. A powered hoist raises the flag at 80 feet (24 m) per minute, regardless of wind conditions, and is synchronized so that the flag reaches the top of the pole just as "The Star Spangled Banner" ends. On October 4, 2007, it was announced that the flag pole would yet again be rebuilt to allow access to the beacon marker on top in case of light bulb replacement. The flag was rebuilt and the top section finished on April 4, 2008. On April 7, 2008, the pole, without a flag yet flying, began swaying noticeably during relatively low wind speeds. On April 8, 2008, the ball and top section were again removed, followed by a full removal of the pole.

In April 2014, Acuity Insurance announced another attempt at the nation's largest flagpole to be erected by that year's Fourth of July, this time with a 400-foot (120 m) pole built in Manitowoc, WI by wind turbine manufacturer Broadwind Energy. The flag measured 120 feet (37 m) by 60 feet (18 m), with an LED lighting system designed to be visible from Cedar Grove 11 miles (18 km) south and much heavier reinforcement of the pole structure. The new flag pole stands 400 feet (120 m) tall. A 120 feet (37 m) by 60 feet (18 m) flag was raised for the first time on May 22, 2014. The pole has a concrete base spanning 11 feet (3.4 m) wide at the bottom, with the top portion able to retract into the bottom portion like a whip antenna in high wind conditions.

In November 2015, Acuity Insurance began flying a 140-foot (43 m) by 70-foot (21 m) flag. The new flag at Acuity Insurance, covering nearly 10,000 square feet, features stripes that are over 5 feet high and stars that are nearly 3 feet across. Weighing 340 pounds dry, the nylon flag requires 72 cubic feet of storage space when not being flown. The flag is the world's largest free-flying American flag.

On June 2, 2020, the flag was severely damaged during a heavy storm. Several red and white stripes were torn away.

== Gallery ==
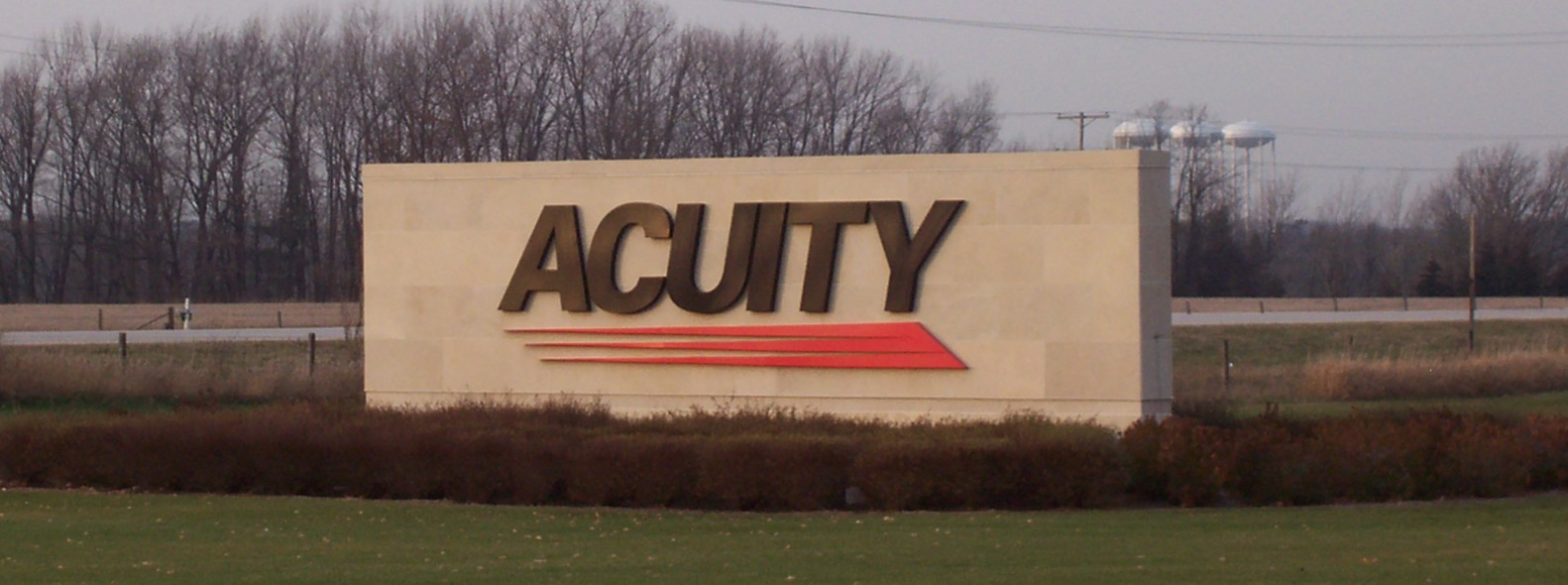
Road sign along Interstate 43

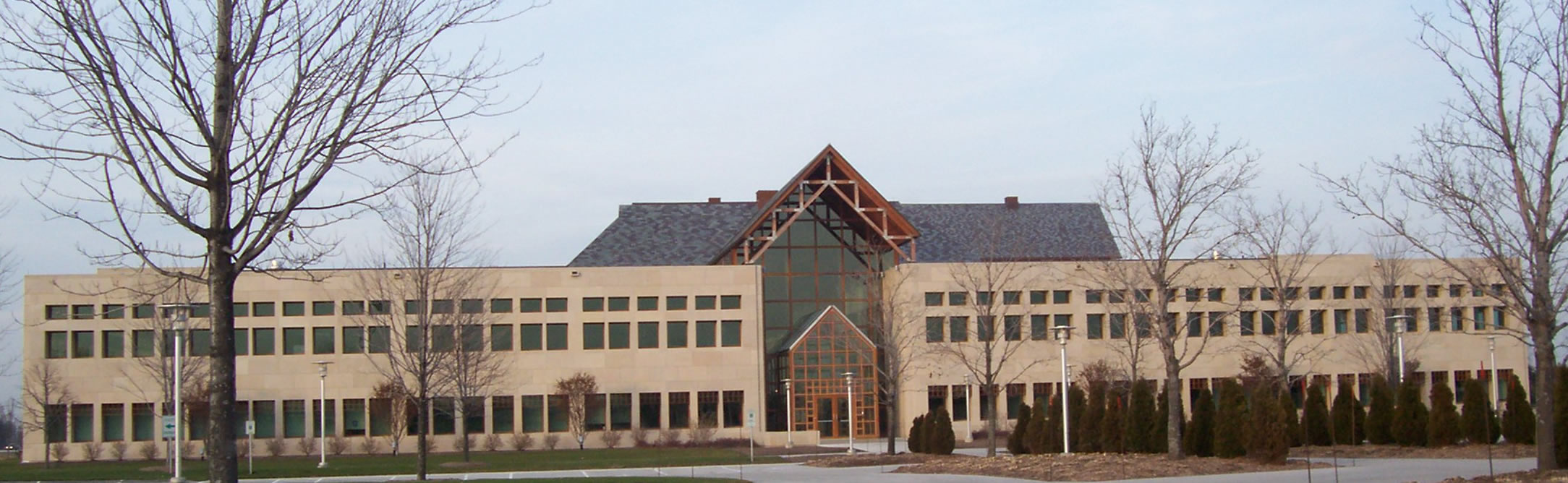
Corporate headquarters

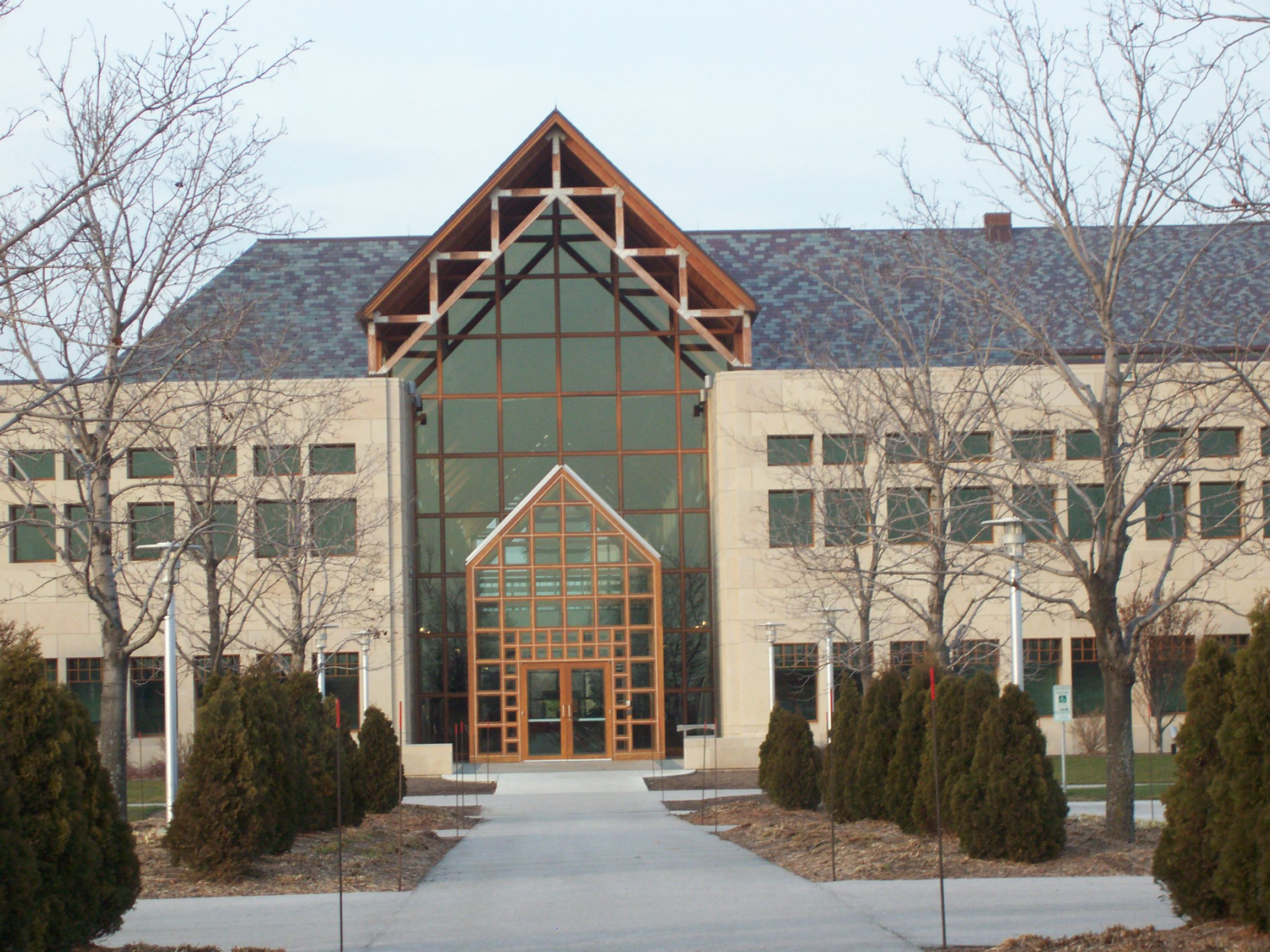
Entrance to corporate headquarters

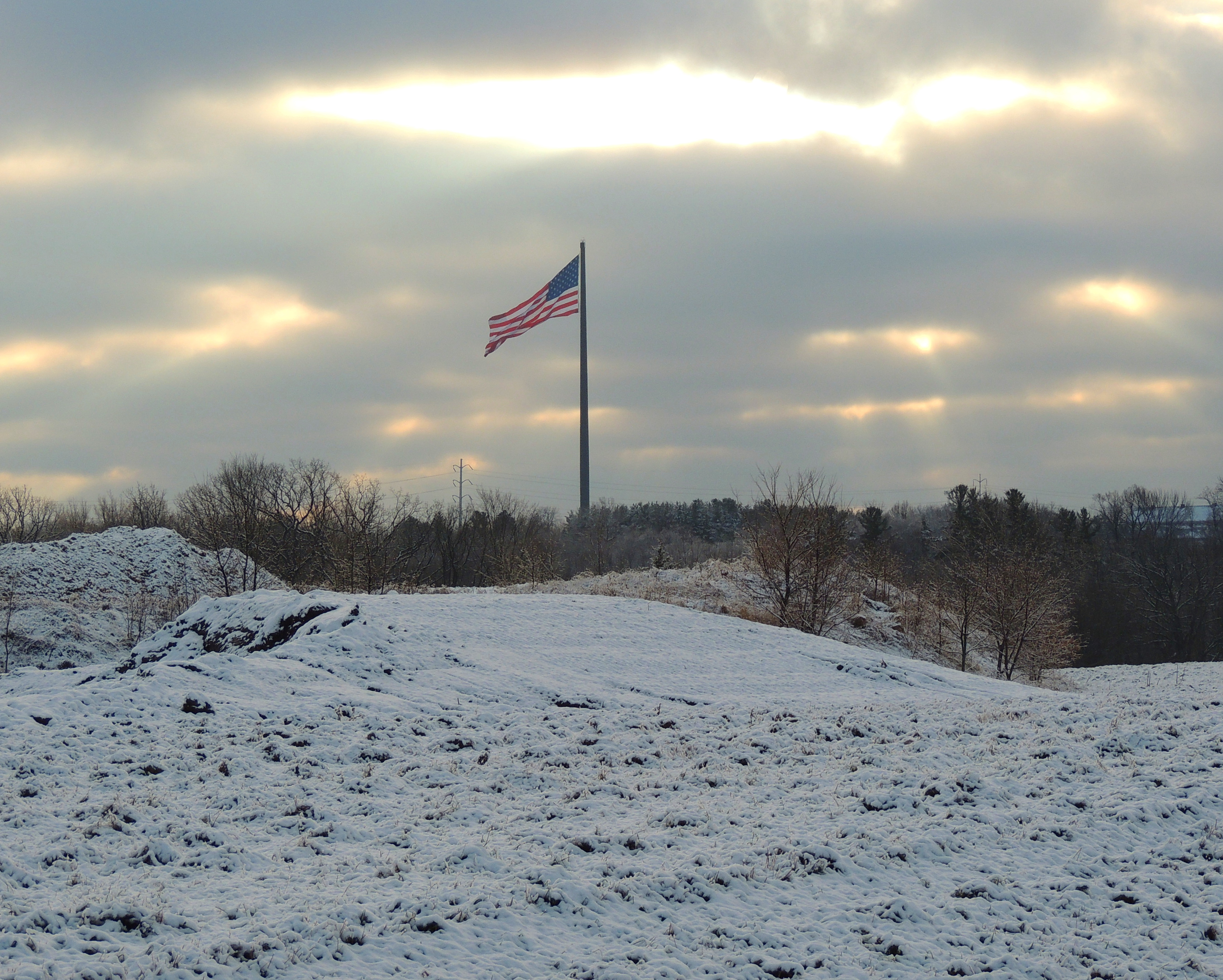
Acuity flagpole seen from Kohler's Blackwolf Run golf course
