= WJMC-FM =

- Rice Lake, Wisconsin; United States
- Broadcast area: Rice Lake-Spooner
- Frequency: FM 96.1 MHz
- RDS: PS: WJMC-FM
- Branding: 96.1 WJMC

Programming
- Format: Country
- Affiliations: Westwood One

Ownership
- Owner: TKC, Inc.
- Sister stations: WJMC (AM), WAQE (AM), WAQE-FM, WKFX

History
- First air date: 1947
- Call sign meaning: Walter and James MCGenty (station founders)

Technical information
- Licensing authority: FCC
- Facility ID: 67197
- Class: C2
- ERP: 50,000 watts
- HAAT: 147.0 meters (482.3 ft)
- Transmitter coordinates: 45°37′14.00″N 91°44′44.00″W

Links
- Public license information: Public file; LMS
- Webcast: Listen Live
- Website: wjmcradio.com

WJMC-FM (96.1 FM) is a radio station broadcasting a country music format. Licensed to Rice Lake, Wisconsin, United States, the station serves the Rice Lake-Spooner area. The station is currently owned by TKC, Inc., and features programming from Westwood One.

== History ==
=== Early years ===
WJMC-FM originated as the FM counterpart to Rice Lake's WJMC AM. The AM station was already listed in the FCC's 1939 list of broadcast stations as a construction permit held by Walter H. McGenty for a 250-watt daytime station on 1210 kHz. WJMC Inc. received a construction permit for an FM station on October 17, 1946. The original permit specified 99.7 MHz, channel 259, with 4.4 kW of power and a 360-foot antenna.

By June 1947, WJMC-FM was listed on 96.3 MHz, channel 242. The FCC granted WJMC-FM its license for a new FM station in December 1947. In the late 1940s, WJMC-FM was also used in regional FM networking. Northpine's history of WEBC-FM notes that, between July 1949 and May 1950, WEBC-FM used WEAU-FM in Eau Claire and WJMC-FM in Rice Lake for a weekday-morning weather roundup on the Arrowhead Network.

=== Signal upgrades ===
WJMC-FM's facilities were upgraded over time. In March 1950, the station filed an application to change its effective radiated power to 7.4 kW. In December 1956, the FCC granted WJMC-FM a construction permit to increase power to 26 kW, raise antenna height to 540 feet, and change transmitter type. In 1965, the FCC granted WJMC-FM a construction permit to install a new transmitter and increase effective radiated power to 100 kW.

=== Koser ownership ===
By the late 1980s, WJMC AM-FM was owned by the Janesville Gazette printing company. Tom Koser, who grew up in the Barron County area, later recalled that the 100 kW FM signal was underused and that he saw WJMC-FM as a possible regional signal for northwestern Wisconsin. Koser purchased WJMC AM/FM in 1989, later adding WAQE AM/FM in 1998 and launching WKFX-FM that same year. By 2014, Koser Radio Group operated 11 stations, including five in Rice Lake, and described them as locally programmed and operated.

=== Move to 96.1 MHz ===
WJMC-FM broadcast on 96.3 MHz until a late-1990s facility realignment. In September 1999, Northpine reported that the FCC had granted KARP in Glencoe, Minnesota, a major move-in toward the Twin Cities market. To make room for that move, WJMC-FM was to downgrade from 100 kW to 50 kW, change frequency from 96.3 to 96.1 MHz, and move its transmitter north. The frequency change was scheduled for February 1, 2000, with WJMC-FM changing from 96.3 to 96.1 at the same time KARP moved to its new 96.3 MHz facility.

=== Sale to Armada ===
In June 2023, Koser agreed to sell his Rice Lake station group to Armada Media Partners. The group included country-formatted WJMC-FM 96.1, WAQE-FM, WKFX, WAQE AM, WJMC AM, and the AM translators. An FCC-filed asset purchase agreement listed the buyer as AMC Partners Rice Lake LLC and the purchase price as $4.951 million. The Wisconsin Broadcasters Association reported that Koser would continue as a consultant and that the existing employees would continue with the stations after closing.

The transfer officially took place on October 3, 2023. WJMC reported that WJMC, WAQE, and WKFX had transferred from Tom Koser's TKC Inc. to Armada Media Partners, and that the Rice Lake stations joined Armada's other small-market stations in Wisconsin, Upper Michigan, Kansas, and Colorado. The station's website identifies WJMC-FM as "The Best Country Station #1" and lists AMC Partners-Rice Lake as the company associated with the Rice Lake radio stations.
