= WKFX =

- Rice Lake, Wisconsin; United States
- Broadcast area: Rice Lake-Spooner, Wisconsin
- Frequency: 99.1 MHz
- Branding: 99.1 The Fox

Programming
- Format: Classic hits

Ownership
- Owner: TKC, Inc.
- Sister stations: WJMC (AM), WJMC-FM, WAQE (AM), WAQE-FM

History
- First air date: 1980 (as WAQE-FM)
- Former call signs: WAQE-FM (1980–1999)
- Former frequencies: 97.7 MHz (1980-1999)

Technical information
- Licensing authority: FCC
- Facility ID: 55339
- Class: C2
- ERP: 44,000 watts
- HAAT: 159 meters (522 ft)
- Transmitter coordinates: 45°22′23.00″N 91°55′22.00″W

Links
- Public license information: Public file; LMS
- Webcast: Listen Live
- Website: fox99.com

WKFX (99.1 FM, "99.1 The Fox") is a radio station broadcasting a classic hits music format. Licensed to Rice Lake, Wisconsin, United States, the station serves the Rice Lake-Spooner area. The station is currently owned by TKC, Inc.

Adam Hutton hosts "The Fox Morning Extravaganza" morning show from 6-11am, middays with Christian Emory from 11am-3pm, and drive time with A.J. from 3-7pm.

== History ==
WKFX traces its history to WAQE-FM, the FM companion to WAQE (1090 AM) in Rice Lake. Station material has stated that WAQE first went on the air in August 1979, with WAQE-FM following in November 1980. Aircheck archives document WAQE-FM in fall 1981 using Drake-Chenault's "Contempo" automation service.

Tom Koser's TKC, Inc. entered the station's history during the expansion of the Koser Radio Group in Rice Lake. Koser purchased WJMC AM/FM in 1989 and, in the fall of 1998, bought competing WAQE AM/FM while also developing another FM signal for the Rice Lake market.

The present WKFX identity emerged from a late-1990s frequency and call-letter shuffle involving WAQE-FM and a separate new 97.7 MHz facility licensed to Barron. WAQE-FM had previously operated on 97.7 MHz as a Rice Lake station and was granted approval to move to 99.1 MHz. After that move was authorized, a new construction permit was issued for a separate 97.7 MHz station licensed to Barron. In September 1999, Upper Midwest Broadcasting reported that WAQE-FM was testing its new 99.1 MHz facility while regular WAQE-FM programming continued on 97.7 MHz. At the time, the expected arrangement was for WAQE-FM to move from 97.7 MHz to 99.1 MHz and for the new Barron 97.7 MHz station to sign on as WKFX.

The final arrangement was different. WKFX began broadcasting on 99.1 MHz in Rice Lake on October 21, 1999, using the "Fox 99-1" branding and a classic hits format.

The M Street Journal also reported the 1999 changes, listing Rice Lake's WKFX on 99.1 MHz with a classic hits format as "The Fox" and Barron's WAQE-FM on 97.7 MHz with a hot adult contemporary format as "Star 97.7". The same issue described WKFX's facilities change as a move to 99.1 MHz, an increase to 44,000 watts, and a Class C2 upgrade.

Under TKC, WKFX was part of a locally operated Rice Lake cluster with WJMC, WJMC-FM, WAQE and WAQE-FM. In a 2014 profile of the Koser Radio Group, Radio World described the group as locally programmed and operated. Koser said the company generated its music playlists internally, emphasized live and local programming, and included local news, information and high-school sports across the FM stations.

In 2023, TKC agreed to sell its Rice Lake stations to Armada Media Partners through AMC Partners Rice Lake, LLC. An FCC public notice listed an assignment application for WKFX, facility ID 55339, from TKC, Inc. to AMC Partners Rice Lake, LLC as accepted for filing on June 29, 2023; the notice listed WKFX as a 99.1 MHz FM station in Rice Lake. NorthPine reported that the asset purchase agreement for the WJMC, WAQE and WKFX group was $4.951 million. The stations officially transferred from Tom Koser and TKC to Armada on October 3, 2023, with Koser retaining WRLS in Hayward and remaining involved with the Rice Lake stations in a managerial role.

WKFX continues to brand as "The Fox 99.1 FM" and promotes a classic-hits format focused on music from the 1970s, 1980s and 1990s.
