= Rice Lake, Wisconsin =

- City
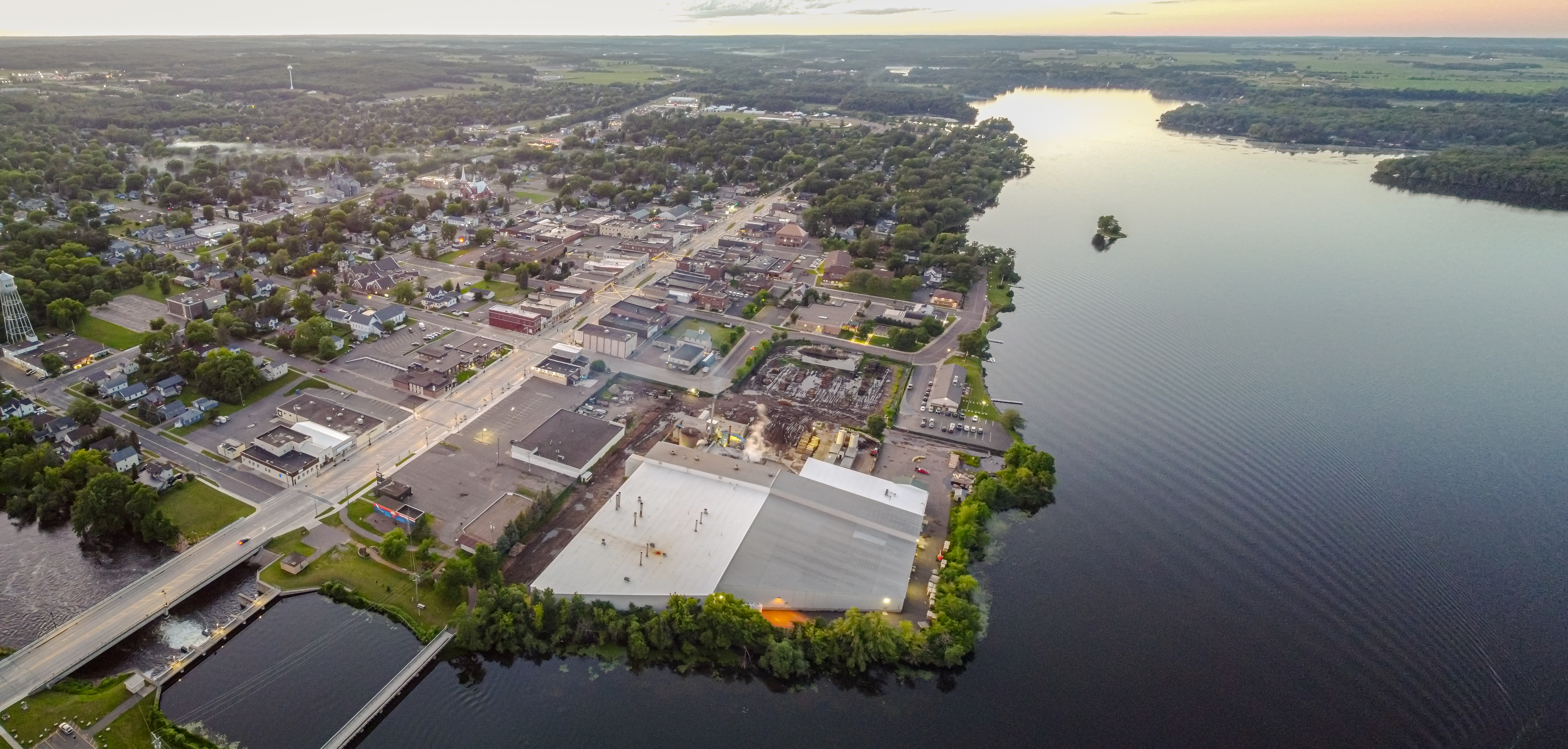
- North side of Rice Lake

- Seal
- Motto: You'll love our friendly nature
- Location of Rice Lake in Barron County, Wisconsin

- Location within Wisconsin Location within the United States Rice Lake (North America)
- Coordinates: 45°29′54″N 91°44′20″W
- Country: United States
- State: Wisconsin
- County: Barron
- Incorporated: April 1, 1887

Government
  - Mayor: Harlan Dodge: Elected April 2, 2024; Inaugurated May 1, 2024

Area
  - Total: 9.75 sq mi (25.25 km^{2})
  - Land: 8.64 sq mi (22.37 km^{2})
  - Water: 1.11 sq mi (2.88 km^{2})
- Elevation: 1,135 ft (346 m)

Population (2020)
  - Total: 9,040
  - Density: 1,050/sq mi (404/km^{2})
- Time zone: UTC-6 (Central)
  - Summer (DST): UTC-5 (CDT)
- ZIP Code: 54868
- Area codes: 715 & 534
- FIPS code: 55-67350
- GNIS feature ID: 1584019
- Website: www.ci.rice-lake.wi.us

Rice Lake is a city in Barron County in northwestern Wisconsin, United States, on the shore of the lake with the same name. The city is a commercial and tourist center for the surrounding rural areas. As of the 2020 census, the city had a total population of 9,040. The city is located mostly within the Town of Rice Lake.

== History ==
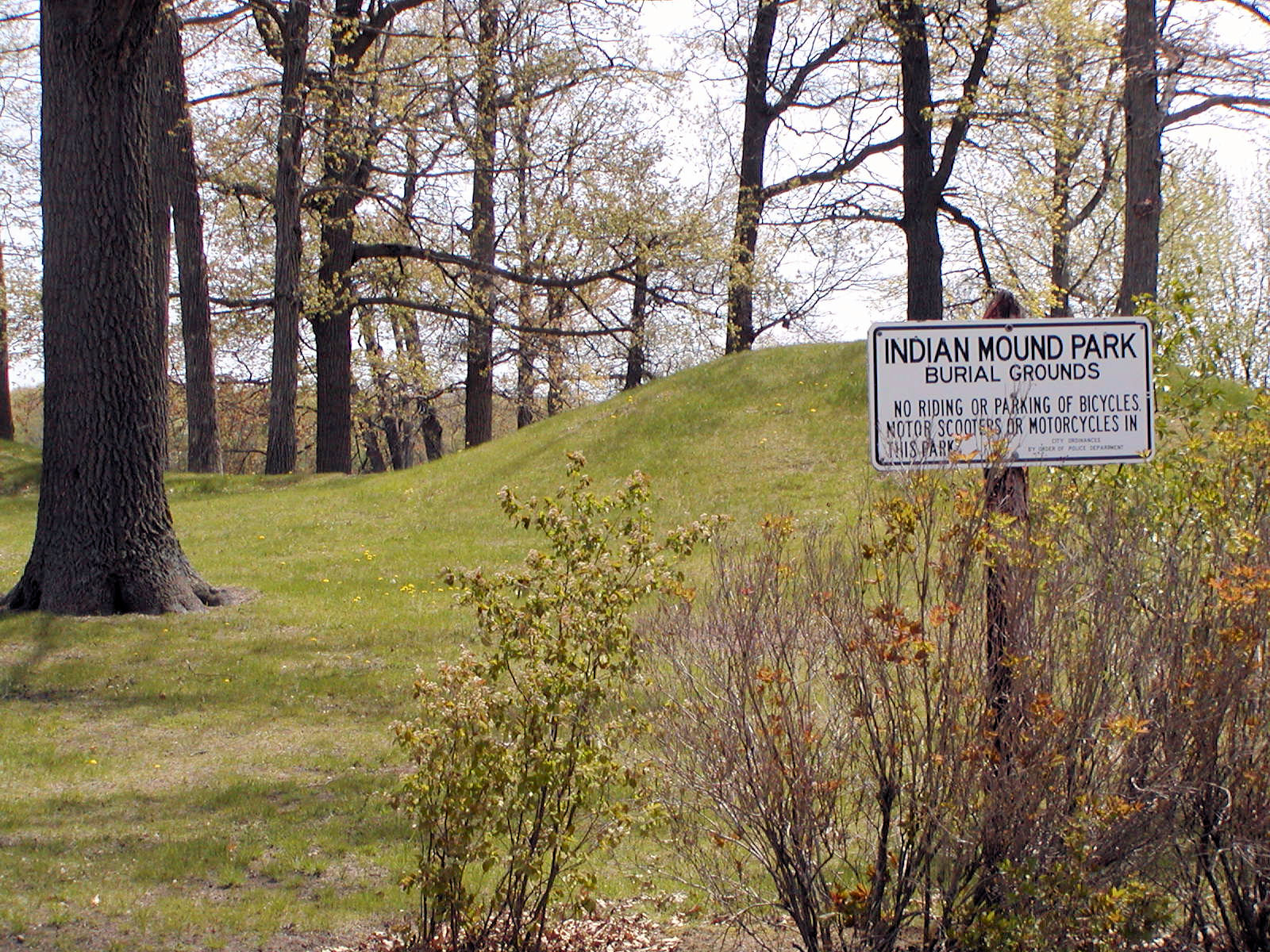
Indian Mounds Park

American Indians lived around Rice Lake for millennia, some of whom made mounds like those that remain in Indian Mounds Park along the shore of the lake. In later years before white settlers, Ojibwe (Chippewa) people occupied the area, and they had a strong cultural attachment to the wild rice that grew on the lake.

In the mid-1860s Knapp, Stout & Co., the growing lumber company downstream at Menomonie, bought tracts of forest around Rice Lake. Around 1868 the company started a logging camp in the area and in 1870 the company dammed the Red Cedar to raise the level of Rice Lake to make a better holding pond for their logs. The higher water disrupted the existing wild rice beds, angering the Ojibwe. As compensation, Knapp-Stout gave them food, but it was settlers' food like pork and flour — not wild rice.

Knapp-Stout platted the village in 1870, naming it for the lake, and naming many streets after officers of the company, including Knapp, Stout, Tainter and Wilson. The company built a small water-powered sawmill for sawing local lumber and a gristmill. Permanent settlers began arriving about that time. The first houses were built around 1874. Saloons and hotels followed. Rice Lake's first school opened in a Knapp-Stout building in 1874. Regular mail service began that year, with the mail arriving by stage from Menomonie and Chippewa Falls, initially once a week. The first newspaper, the Chronotype, started the same year.

Many employees of the early Knapp-Stout were Norwegian and in 1875 a Norwegian Lutheran congregation was organized. A local brewery was also started in 1875. Episcopalian families began worshiping intermittently in 1879. Roman Catholics began meeting the following year, building a church the same year — the first brick building in the village. Knapp-Stout added a flour mill in 1879. A Methodist Episcopal congregation also formed in 1880, and a Presbyterian congregation in 1882.

In 1882 the first railroad reached Rice Lake — the Chippewa Falls and Northern Railroad, and the four-year high school was started. The following year the first bank opened — the Barron County Bank. A barrel factory opened in 1885, employing 40 men, and a hub and spoke factory in 1886, employing 50 in summer and 125 during logging season. In 1887 the Rice Lake Lumber Company opened, owned by Orrin Henry Ingram of Eau Claire. It expanded Knapp-Stout's sawmill, added two planing mills, and employed 200.

Rice Lake incorporated as a city in 1887. A volunteer fire department was formed in 1889, which was equipped with a hook and ladder wagon, a hand hose cart, and 1,300 feet of hose. The city's population was 2,130 in the 1890 census. A city library opened in 1897. The lumber companies set up electric lights and a water utility in 1892, which were taken over by the city in 1910.

In 1907 the Barron County Normal School opened. In 1938 WJMC, the area's first radio station, began broadcasting. In 1940 the forerunner of Indianhead Tech College was established. In 1966 UW-Stout opened a branch campus in Barron County, which has since developed into UW-Eau Claire – Barron County.

== Geography ==
Rice Lake is located at 45°29′54″N 91°44′20″W (45.498408, -91.738844).

According to the United States Census Bureau, the city has a total area of 9.70 square miles (25.12 km^{2}), of which 8.60 square miles (22.27 km^{2}) is land and 1.10 square miles (2.85 km^{2}) is water.

Rice Lake is along the Red Cedar River.

=== Climate ===
Climate data for Rice Lake, Wisconsin, 1991–2020 normals, extremes 1982–2022
Month	Jan	Feb	Mar	Apr	May	Jun	Jul	Aug	Sep	Oct	Nov	Dec	Year
Record high °F (°C)	50 (10)	56 (13)	80 (27)	88 (31)	94 (34)	98 (37)	100 (38)	101 (38)	92 (33)	85 (29)	73 (23)	60 (16)	101 (38)
Mean maximum °F (°C)	39.2 (4.0)	45.4 (7.4)	60.6 (15.9)	75.9 (24.4)	84.8 (29.3)	89.6 (32.0)	90.8 (32.7)	90.0 (32.2)	85.7 (29.8)	76.6 (24.8)	59.6 (15.3)	43.9 (6.6)	93.1 (33.9)
Mean daily maximum °F (°C)	21.6 (−5.8)	27.2 (−2.7)	39.6 (4.2)	54.3 (12.4)	67.8 (19.9)	77.3 (25.2)	81.4 (27.4)	79.5 (26.4)	71.4 (21.9)	56.8 (13.8)	40.4 (4.7)	27.1 (−2.7)	53.7 (12.1)
Daily mean °F (°C)	11.6 (−11.3)	16.0 (−8.9)	28.9 (−1.7)	43.0 (6.1)	56.2 (13.4)	66.0 (18.9)	70.1 (21.2)	67.9 (19.9)	59.6 (15.3)	46.1 (7.8)	31.7 (−0.2)	18.5 (−7.5)	43.0 (6.1)
Mean daily minimum °F (°C)	1.7 (−16.8)	4.8 (−15.1)	18.1 (−7.7)	31.6 (−0.2)	44.7 (7.1)	54.7 (12.6)	58.8 (14.9)	56.3 (13.5)	47.8 (8.8)	35.3 (1.8)	22.9 (−5.1)	10.0 (−12.2)	32.2 (0.1)
Mean minimum °F (°C)	−21.4 (−29.7)	−17.7 (−27.6)	−6.1 (−21.2)	16.5 (−8.6)	29.9 (−1.2)	40.1 (4.5)	48.1 (8.9)	45.1 (7.3)	33.0 (0.6)	21.4 (−5.9)	5.5 (−14.7)	−14.2 (−25.7)	−23.9 (−31.1)
Record low °F (°C)	−38 (−39)	−37 (−38)	−26 (−32)	−2 (−19)	20 (−7)	32 (0)	41 (5)	34 (1)	26 (−3)	11 (−12)	−17 (−27)	−40 (−40)	−40 (−40)
Average precipitation inches (mm)	0.89 (23)	0.82 (21)	1.47 (37)	2.77 (70)	3.85 (98)	4.17 (106)	3.98 (101)	4.21 (107)	3.34 (85)	3.03 (77)	1.68 (43)	1.22 (31)	31.43 (799)
Average snowfall inches (cm)	10.5 (27)	10.7 (27)	8.9 (23)	3.5 (8.9)	0.5 (1.3)	0.0 (0.0)	0.0 (0.0)	0.0 (0.0)	0.0 (0.0)	0.8 (2.0)	5.7 (14)	11.9 (30)	52.5 (133.2)
Average precipitation days (≥ 0.01 in)	7.6	5.9	7.1	10.1	12.0	12.4	10.7	10.5	10.5	9.8	7.0	7.7	111.3
Average snowy days (≥ 0.1 in)	6.8	5.4	3.5	1.6	0.1	0.0	0.0	0.0	0.0	0.4	2.8	6.4	27.0
Source 1: NOAA
Source 2: National Weather Service

== Demographics ==
Historical population
Census	Pop.	Note	%±
1880	362		—
1890	2,130		488.4%
1900	3,002		40.9%
1910	3,968		32.2%
1920	4,457		12.3%
1930	5,177		16.2%
1940	5,719		10.5%
1950	6,898		20.6%
1960	7,303		5.9%
1970	7,278		−0.3%
1980	7,691		5.7%
1990	7,998		4.0%
2000	8,320		4.0%
2010	8,438		1.4%
2020	9,040		7.1%
2019 (est.)	8,509		0.8%
U.S. Decennial Census

As of 2000, the median income for a household in the city was $34,637, and the median income for a family was $53,056. Males had a median income of $40,450 versus $30,211 for females. The per capita income for the city was $22,354. About 6.9% of families and 13.3% of the population were below the poverty line, including 13.4% of those under age 18 and 13.1% of those age 65 or over.

=== 2010 census ===
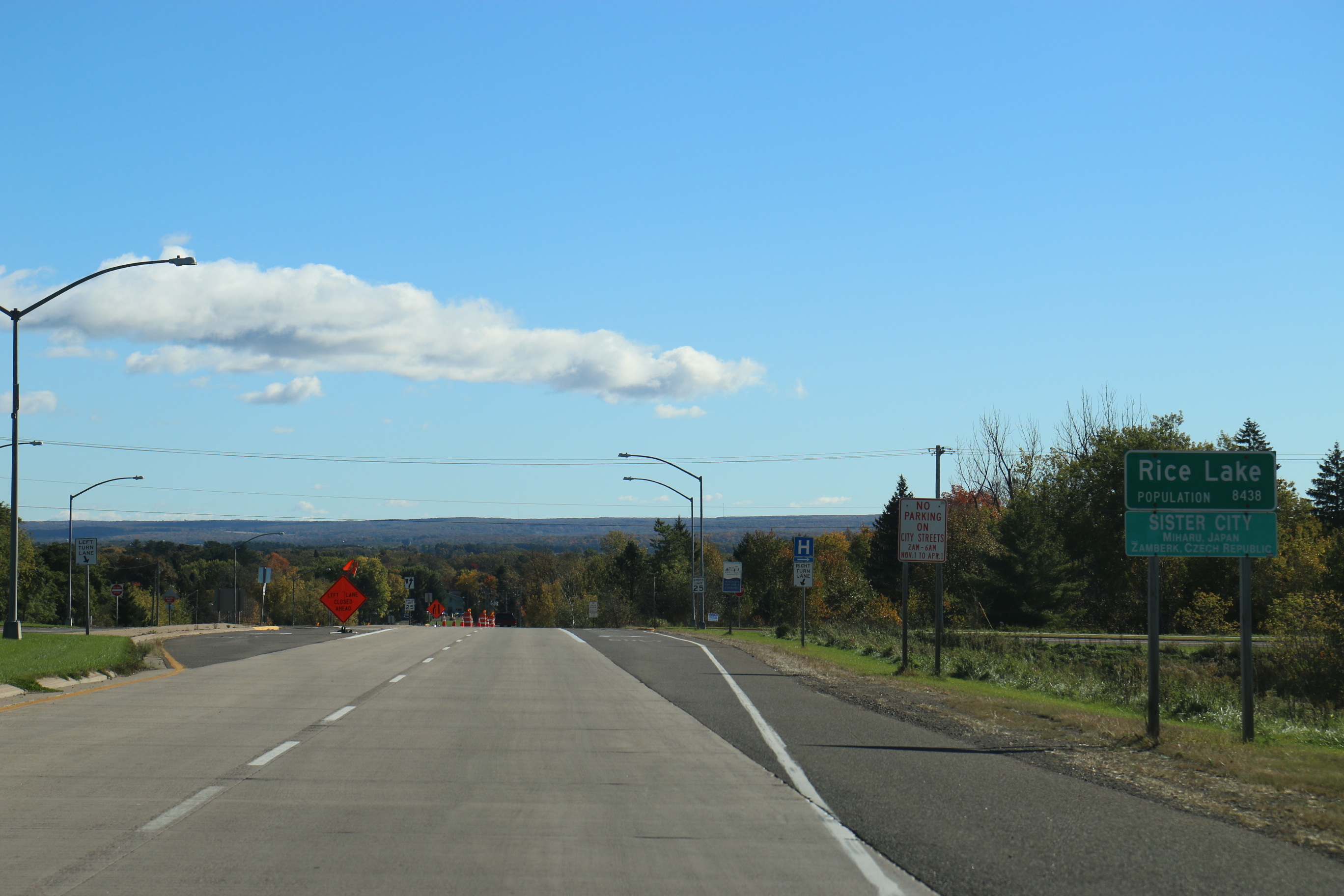
Looking east at the sign for Rice Lake on WIS 48

As of the census of 2010, there were 8,438 people, 3,936 households, and 2,065 families residing in the city. The population density was 981.2 inhabitants per square mile (378.8/km^{2}). There were 4,239 housing units at an average density of 492.9 units per square mile (190.3 units/km^{2}). The racial makeup of the city was 96.2% White, 0.3% African American, 0.9% Native American, 0.8% Asian, 0.5% from other races, and 1.3% from two or more races. Hispanic or Latino people of any race were 2.4% of the population.

There were 3,936 households, of which 24.3% had children under the age of 18 living with them, 37.6% were married couples living together, 10.9% had a female householder with no husband present, 4.0% had a male householder with no wife present, and 47.5% were non-families. 39.3% of all households were made up of individuals, and 17.6% had someone living alone who was 65 years of age or older. The average household size was 2.09 and the average family size was 2.79.

The median age in the city was 41.2 years. 20.6% of residents were under the age of 18; 10.1% were between the ages of 18 and 24; 23.5% were from 25 to 44; 24.5% were from 45 to 64; and 21.2% were 65 years of age or older. The gender makeup of the city was 46.8% male and 53.2% female.

== Infrastructure ==
U.S. Highway 53, Wisconsin Highway 48, County Road SS (Main Street), and County Road O (South Access Road) are the main routes in the city.

The area is served by Rice Lake Regional Airport - Carl's Field (KRPD), which is located south of Rice Lake.

Rice Lake formerly had passenger rail service at the Rice Lake station.

The town spends $325,000 annually on infrastructure.

== Education ==
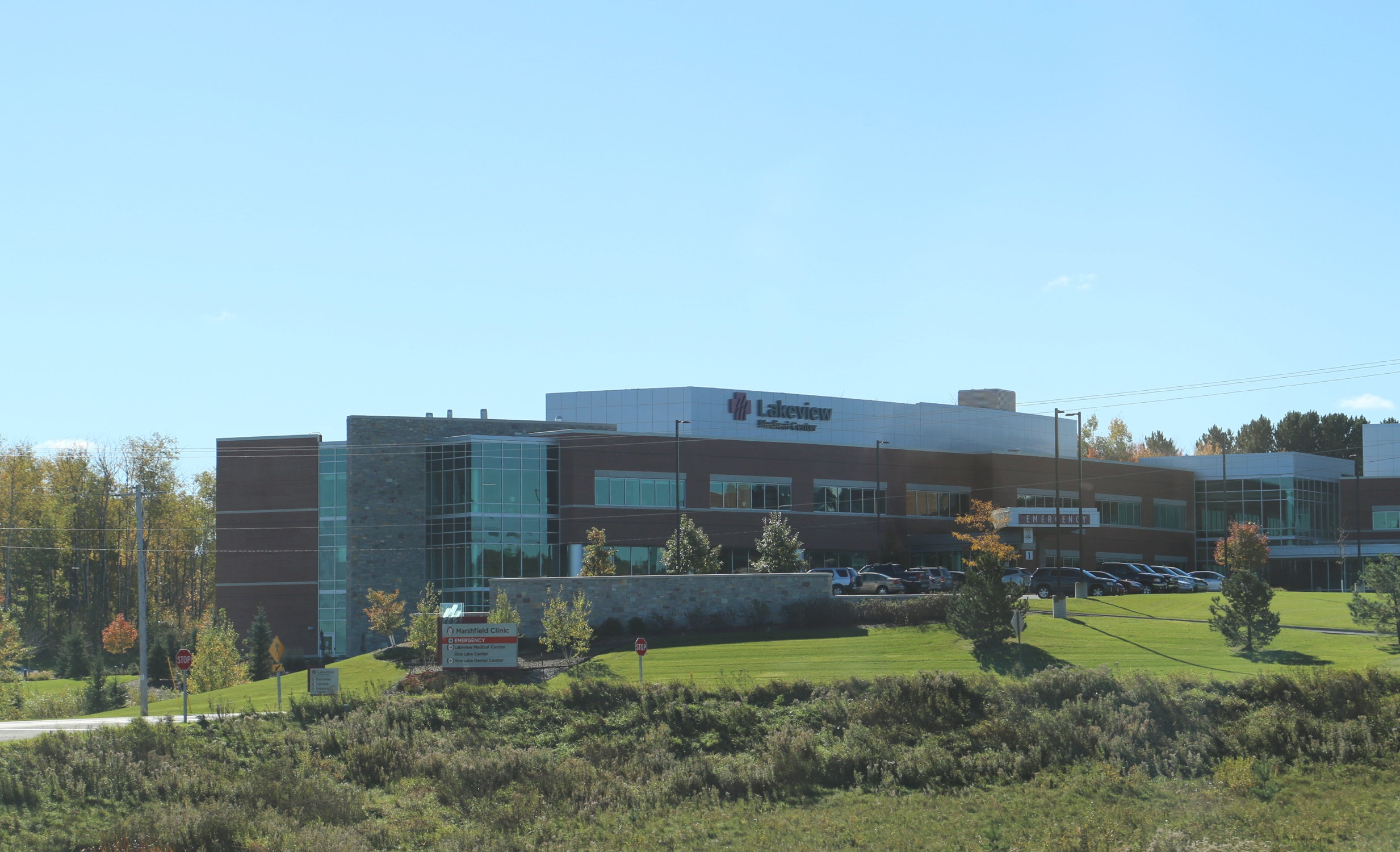
Lakeview Medical Center in Rice Lake

=== Public schools ===
Rice Lake Area School District operates public schools:

- Rice Lake High School
- Northern Lakes Regional Academy
- Rice Lake Middle School
- Haugen Elementary
- Hilltop Elementary
- Tainter Elementary

=== Private schools ===
- Redeemer Lutheran School
- St. Joseph School

=== Post-secondary education ===
- University of Wisconsin–Barron County
- Northwood Technical College (formerly Wisconsin Indianhead Technical College) - Rice Lake Campus

== Economy ==
Rice Lake serves as a shopping, industrial, educational, and medical hub for the surrounding rural communities of Barron, Cameron, Chetek, Shell Lake, Cumberland, Turtle Lake, Spooner, and Ladysmith.

The annual city budget is $915,000. The largest source of revenue for the city is property taxes, with $430,000 of income. The largest expenditure of the city is infrastructure, the town budget for which was $325,000 in 2022.

The city is home to Rice Lake Weighing Systems, a multinational scale manufacturer.

== Notable people ==
- Kenny Bednarek - Olympic medalist in track
- John G. Blystone - film director
- Edward R. Brunner - justice of Wisconsin Court of Appeals
- Howard W. Cameron - Wisconsin State Senator
- William M. Conley - federal judge
- William Henry Dietz - college and NFL head coach
- Henry Ellenson - professional basketball player for the New York Knicks
- Ric Flair - pro wrestler (not from Rice Lake, however he made his pro wrestling debut and had his first ever match in Rice Lake)
- Foster Friess - businessman
- Eric G. Gibson - Medal of Honor recipient
- Hal Kolstad - MLB player
- Isaac J. Kvam - Wisconsin State Representative
- Dick Lane - announcer, film and television actor
- James P. Leary - folklorist
- Warren D. Leary - Wisconsin State Representative
- Michael A. Lehman - Wisconsin State Representative
- Pug Lund - football player
- Harold Olsen - head coach of Ohio State, Northwestern and NBA's Chicago Stags, member of Naismith Memorial Basketball Hall of Fame
- Clay Perry - MLB player
- Romaine Quinn - youngest mayor to serve in Rice Lake history and State Representative
- Jason Rae - Secretary of Democratic National Committee
- Kapp Rasmussen - Wisconsin State Representative and lawyer
- Fred Thomas - MLB player
- John W. Vaudreuil - U.S. Attorney

== Sister cities ==
Rice Lake has two sister cities:

- Miharu, Japan
- Žamberk, Czech Republic

== Local media ==
- WAQE (AM) 1090, Talk & Sports
- WAQE-FM 97.7, All the Stars, All the Time
- WJMC (AM) 1240, Good Friends and Great Information
- WJMC-FM 96.1, The Best Country Station, Number One
- WKFX FM 99.1, Classic Hits
- WWJP-LP FM 101.7, 3ABN Radio, Christian
- WYRL-LP FM 105.5, Eclectic Music, Local Government Discussion
