= List of Hawaii companies =

The following list of Hawaii companies includes notable companies that are, or once were, headquartered in Hawaii.

== Companies based in Hawaii ==
=== A ===
- ABC Stores
- Alexander & Baldwin
- Aloha Air Cargo
- Aloha Petroleum
- American Savings Bank
- Anna Miller's
- Aqua Hotels and Resorts

=== B ===
- Bank of Hawaii
- Bank of the Orient
- Bess Press
- Big Island Air
- Blue Planet Software
- Blue Startups
- Bubbies

=== C ===
- Central Pacific Bank

=== E ===
- EAH Housing

=== F ===
- First Hawaiian Bank
- Foodland Hawaii

=== H ===
- Hawai'i Academy of Recording Arts
- Hawaiian Airlines
- Hawaii Community Federal Credit Union
- Hawaiian Electric Industries
- Hawaii Medical Service Association
- Hawaii National Bank
- Hawaiʻi Public Radio
- Hawaii State Federal Credit Union
- Hawaiian Telcom
- Hawaiian Tel Federal Credit Union
- Hitchhike Records
- Honolulu Civil Beat
- Honolulu Cookie Company

=== I ===
- Island Pacific Energy

=== K ===
- Kamakura Corporation
- Kanemitsu Bakery
- Kaneohe Ranch
- Kauaʻi Island Utility Cooperative
- Koa Coffee Plantation
- Koa Books
- Kona Brewing Company
- KTA Super Stores
- Kuakini Medical Center

=== L ===
- Leonard's Bakery
- L&L Hawaiian Barbecue
- Longs Drugs

=== M ===
- Matson, Inc.
- Maui Land & Pineapple Company
- Mauna Loa Macadamia Nut Corporation
- Mokulele Airlines
- Mountain Apple Company

=== O ===
- Oahu Ice and Cold Storage Company
- Ohana by Hawaiian
- Outrigger Hotels & Resorts

=== P ===
- Pacific LightNet
- Phase2 International
- Polynesian Adventure Tours

=== R ===
- Reyn Spooner
- Roy's

=== S ===
- Shirokiya
- Sullivan Family of Companies
- Sunetric
- Surfing Goat Dairy

=== T ===
- Tasaka Guri-Guri
- Times Supermarkets
- Tori Richard
- Trans Executive Airlines

=== U ===
- University of Hawaii Press

=== V ===
- Vintage Cave Club
- Visionary Related Entertainment
- Volcano Winery

=== Y ===
- Young Brothers Hawaii

=== Z ===
- Zippy's

== Companies formerly based in Hawaii ==
=== 0-9 ===
- 50th State Big Time Wrestling

=== A ===
- Air Hawaii
- Aloha Airlines
- Amfac, Inc.

=== B ===
- Big Five
- Blossoming Lotus

=== C ===
- C. Brewer & Co.
- Code Rebel
- Crazy Shirts

=== D ===
- Dole Food Company

=== E ===
- ERGO Baby

=== G ===
- Go! Mokulele

=== H ===
- Hawaii Music Awards
- Hawaiian News Company
- Hawaii Superferry

=== I ===
- Inter-Island Steam Navigation Company
- Island Air

=== K ===
- Kiewit Corporation

=== M ===
- Maui and Sons
- Maui Tacos

=== P ===
- Pacific Wings

=== S ===
- Salvation Army Waiʻoli Tea Room
- Sopogy

=== V ===
- Verifone

=== W ===
- Wahoo's Fish Taco
