= Aloha Stadium =

Former stadium in Hālawa, Hawaii

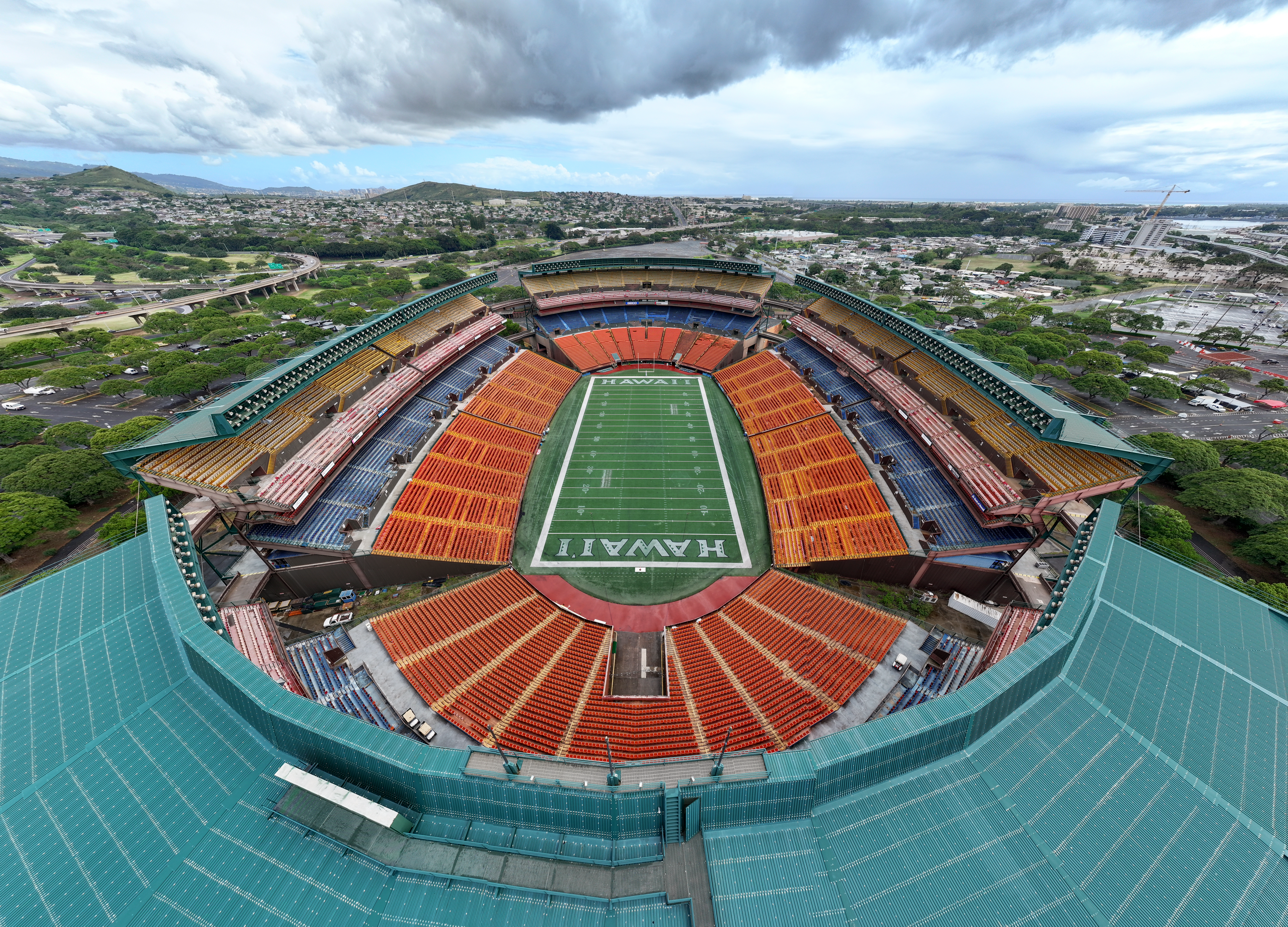
- The stadium in 2024, in a state of abandonment

- Location on the island of Oahu Location in Hawaii
- Interactive map of Aloha Stadium
- Former names: Hawaiian Airlines Field at Aloha Stadium (2011–2015) Hawaiian Tel Federal Credit Union Field at Aloha Stadium (2016–2019)
- Address: 99–500 Salt Lake Boulevard; Aiea, HI 96701
- Location: Hālawa, Hawaii, U.S.
- Coordinates: 21.373°N 157.93°W
- Owner: State of Hawaii
- Operator: Hawaii Stadium Authority
- Capacity: 50,000
- Surface: S5 (2011–2020); FieldTurf (2003–2011); AstroTurf (1975–2002)
- Field size: Baseball; Left Field: 325 ft (99 m); Center Field: 420 ft (128 m); Right Field: 325 ft (99 m)
- Public transit: Skyline at Hālawa

Construction
- Opened: September 12, 1975
- Closed: December 17, 2020
- Demolished: February – November 2026
- Cost: $37 million ($221 million in 2025)
- Architects: Luckman Partnership, Inc.

Tenants
- Hawaii Rainbow Warriors (NCAA) 1975–2020; The Hawaiians (WFL) 1975; Hawaii Islanders (PCL) 1976–1987; Team Hawaii (NASL) 1977; Pro Bowl (NFL) 1980–2009, 2011–2014, 2016; Hula Bowl (NCAA) 1976–1997, 2006–2008, 2020–2021; Aloha Bowl (NCAA) 1982–2000; Oʻahu Bowl (NCAA) 1998–2000; Hawaiʻi Bowl (NCAA) 2002–2019

Website
- alohastadium.hawaii.gov

Aloha Stadium was a multi-purpose stadium in Hālawa, Hawaii, a western suburb of Honolulu. Located just south of Aiea off the northeastern corner of Pearl Harbor next to the Kamehameha Highway, it was the largest stadium in the state of Hawaii. The stadium ceased fan-attended operations in December 2020, and demolition commenced in December 2025. It is set to be replaced by a 40,000-seat multi-purpose stadium that will be constructed on the same site, retaining the original structure's north and south endzone seating.

Aloha Stadium served as home to the University of Hawaiʻi Rainbow Warriors football team (Mountain West Conference, NCAA Division I FBS) for the 1975 through 2020 seasons. It also hosted college football's Hawaiʻi Bowl (2002–2019) and Hula Bowl (1976–1997, 2006–2008, 2020–2021), and formerly was home to the National Football League's Pro Bowl from 1980 through 2016 (except in 2010 and 2015). It also hosted numerous high school football games, and served as a venue for large concerts and events, including high school graduation ceremonies. The stadium was home field for the AAA Hawaii Islanders of the Pacific Coast League (PCL) from 1975 to 1987, before the team moved to Colorado Springs. Frequent swap meets in the stadium's parking lot often draw large crowds.

== History ==
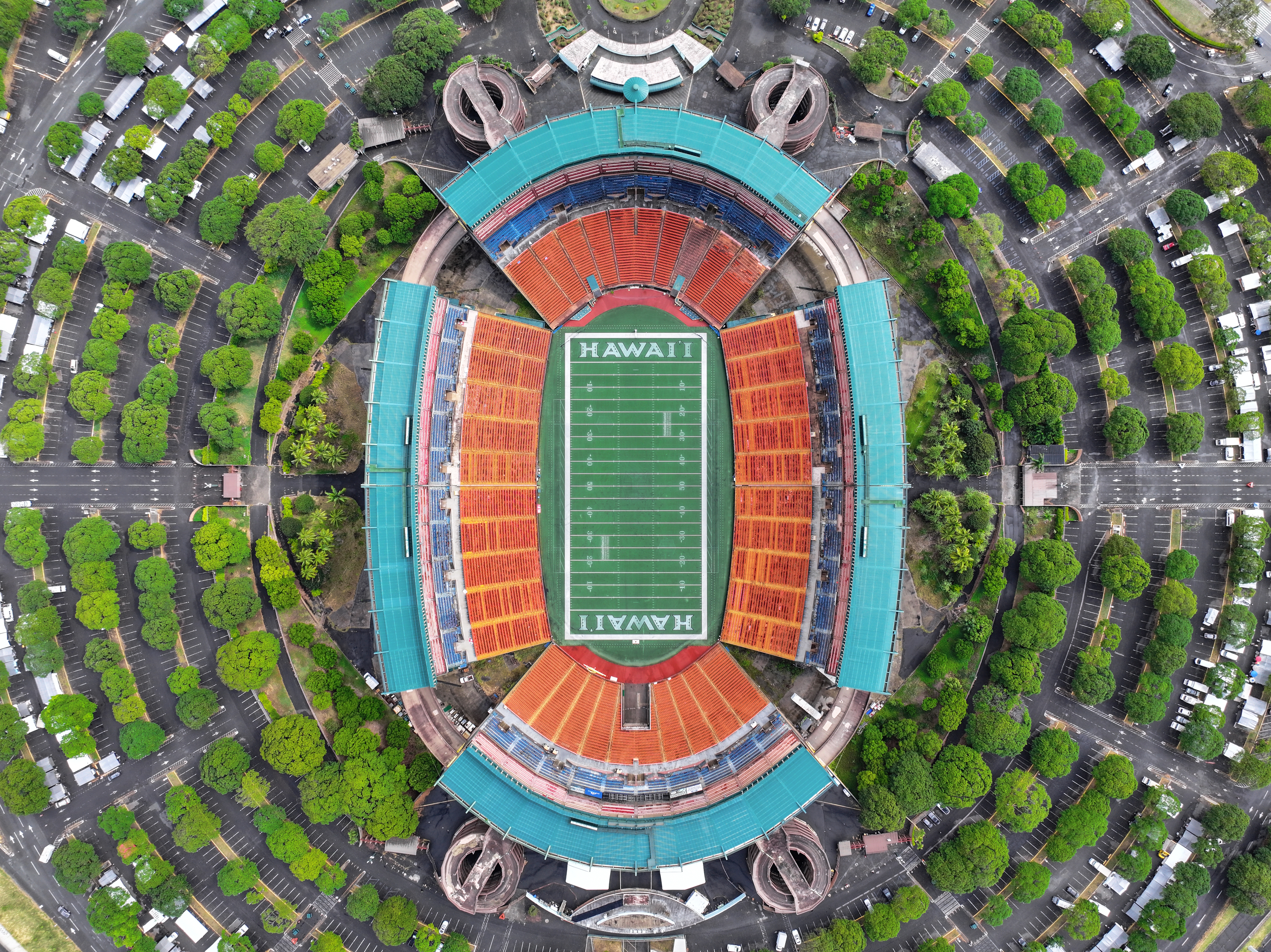
Aerial view in football configuration

Before 1975, Honolulu's main outdoor stadium had been Honolulu Stadium, a wooden stadium on King Street. However, it had reached the end of its useful life by the 1960s, and was well below the standards for Triple-A baseball. The need for a new stadium was hastened by the move of the Hawaii Rainbows football program to NCAA Division I. Located west of downtown Honolulu and 2 miles (3.2 km) north of Honolulu International Airport, Aloha Stadium was constructed in 1975 at a cost of $37 million. Constructed of steel, the stadium was nicknamed the "Metal Mecca".

As originally built, Aloha Stadium had various configurations for different sport venues and other purposes. Four movable 7,000-seat sections, each 3.5 million pounds (1,600,000 kg) could move using air casters into a diamond configuration for baseball (also used for soccer), an oval for football, or a triangle for concerts. The baseball field was aligned north-northwest (home plate to centerfield), as was the football field.

The first sporting event at Aloha Stadium was a college football game between Hawaii and Texas A&I (now Texas A&M-Kingsville) on September 13, 1975. Played on Saturday night, the crowd was 32,247, and the visitors prevailed, 43–9.

The final sporting event held in Aloha Stadium was the 2021 Hula Bowl. The last points scored at Aloha Stadium were a "pick 6" touchdown scored by Carlo Kemp of the University of Michigan.

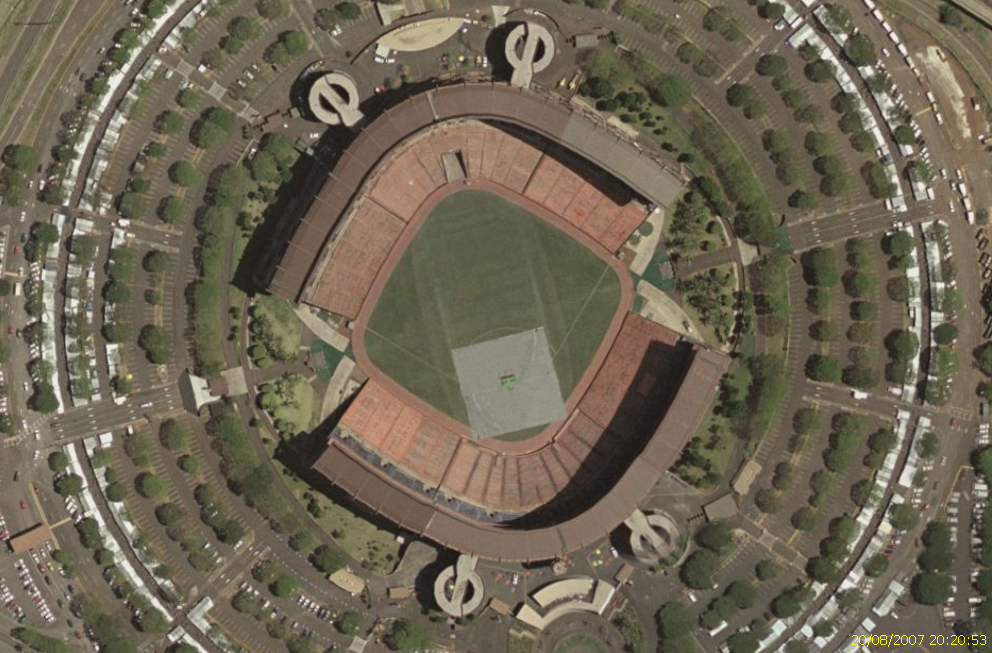
Aerial view in baseball/soccer configuration

The stadium was somewhat problematic for its initial primary tenant, the minor league baseball Hawaii Islanders. Located in south-central Oahu, it was far from the team's fan base in Mōʻiliʻili, and many were unwilling to make the drive. Additionally, while local public transportation (TheBus) stopped at the main gate of Honolulu Stadium, the stop for Aloha Stadium was located some distance from the gate. As a result, attendance plummeted and never really recovered—a major factor in the franchise's ultimate move to the mainland.

Additionally, stadium management initially refused to allow the use of metal spikes on the AstroTurf. During a game in early May 1976, the starting pitcher for the Tacoma Twins, Bill Butler, wore metal spikes to comply with a directive from Tacoma's parent club. In response, stadium management turned off the center field lights, and after 35 minutes, umpires forfeited the game to the Twins. The Islanders protested, claiming they had no control over the lights. However, the Pacific Coast League (PCL) sided with the Twins, citing a league rule that the home team is responsible for providing acceptable playing facilities. After the teams ended the season in a tie for first in the PCL's Western Division, Hawaii won a one-game playoff in Tacoma.

In January 2007, the stadium was permanently locked into its football configuration due to cost and maintenance issues. An engineer from Rolair Systems, the NASA spin-off company that engineered the system, claims that the problem was caused by a concrete contractor that ignored specifications for the concrete pads under the stadium.

=== Concerns ===
There were numerous discussions with Hawaii lawmakers who were concerned with the physical condition of the stadium. There were also several issues regarding rusting of the facility, several hundred seats that need to be replaced, and restroom facilities that need to be expanded to accommodate more patrons. Much of the rust was due to building the stadium with weathering steel. U.S. Steel Corporation suggested the steel would develop a protective patina that would eliminate the need for painting. However, given Honolulu's ocean-salt-laden climate, the steel never stopped rusting.

A 2005 study by Honolulu engineering firm Wiss, Janney, Elstner Associates, Inc. determined that the stadium required $99 million to be completely restored and an additional $115 million for ongoing maintenance and refurbishment over the next 20 years to extend its useful life. In early 2007, the state legislature proposed to spend $300 million to build a new facility as opposed to spending approximately $216 million to extend the life of Aloha Stadium for another 20–30 years.

One council member said that if immediate repairs were not made within the next seven years, then the stadium would probably have to be demolished due to safety concerns. In May 2007, the state allotted $12.4 million to be used towards removing corrosion and rust from the structure.

=== Expansion and improvements ===
In 2003, the stadium surface was changed from AstroTurf (which had been in place since the stadium opened) to FieldTurf. In July 2011, the field was replaced with an Act Global UBU Sports Speed S5-M synthetic turf system.

In 2008, the state of Hawaii approved the bill of $185 million to refurbish the aging Aloha Stadium. In 2010, Aloha Stadium completely retrofitted its scoreboard and video screen to be more up to date with its high definition capability. The Aloha Stadium Authority planned to add more luxury suites, replacing all seats, rusting treatments, parking lots, more restrooms, pedestrian bridge supports, an enclosed lounge, and more. There was also a proposal that would have enclosed the four openings in the corners of the stadium to add more seats.

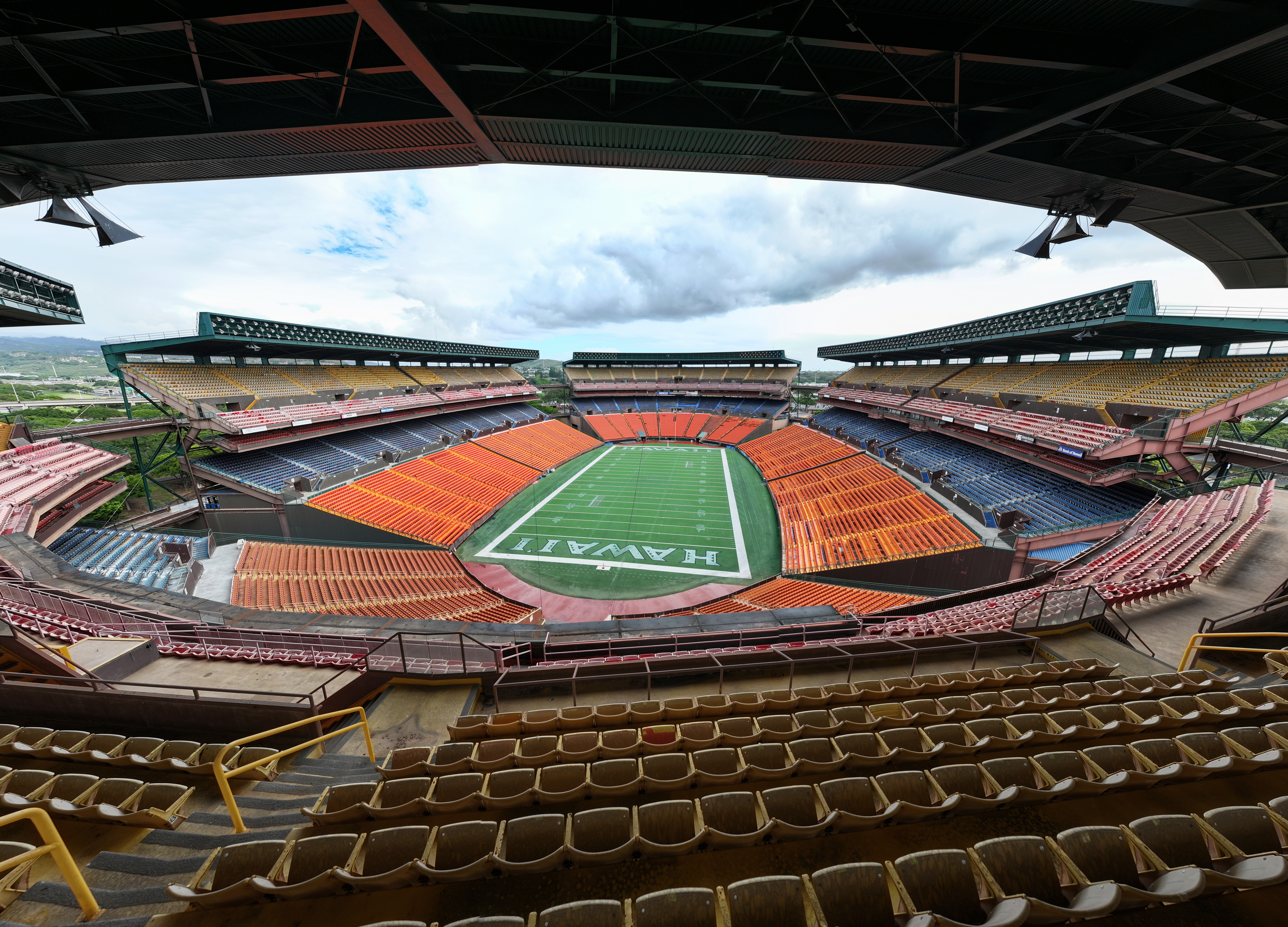
View from upper deck in 2024

In 2011, the playing field was refurbished in part due to a naming rights sponsorship from Hawaiian Airlines. As a result of the sponsorship deal, the field was referred to as Hawaiian Airlines Field at Aloha Stadium. The airline did not renew sponsorship after the deal expired in 2016. As a result, the field went unnamed until late August, when Hawaiian Tel Federal Credit Union signed a three-year $275,000 agreement. As of 2016, the field was known as Hawaiian Tel Federal Credit Union Field at Aloha Stadium.

In early 2017, there was a study in the Honolulu Star-Advertiser about replacing Aloha Stadium due to safety concerns and a liability risk. The plan was then to build a smaller 30,000 seat stadium on the existing property and also build commercial development around the stadium. In theory, this would save the state millions of dollars instead of renovating and keep the existing stadium as it was.

In July 2019, Governor of Hawaii David Ige signed Act 268 into law, appropriating $350 million for an Aloha Stadium redevelopment project. The funds were to go toward the construction of a new stadium and land development, including a mixed-use sports and entertainment complex.

=== Closure to new events ===
A December 17, 2020, announcement by the Aloha Stadium Authority stated that the stadium would be ceasing fan-attended operations indefinitely. The closure was related to financial issues caused by the COVID-19 pandemic. The stadium, built in 1975, was also plagued by maintenance issues in recent years. A 2019 story from the Honolulu Star-Advertiser noted that the stadium needed $30 million in repairs. KHON-TV reported that the stadium would be condemned and was deemed unsafe to hold any crowds at all. The scheduling of new events was also halted. In January 2021, the University of Hawaii announced that the Rainbow Warriors football team would play their home games on campus "for at least the next three years".

=== New stadium ===
Concept for New Aloha Stadium Entertainment District

The New Aloha Stadium is a proposed 25,000–35,000 seat multi-purpose stadium to be built in Halawa, Hawaii. It will replace, and be constructed on the site of, the condemned Aloha Stadium, with demolition by Aloha Halawa District Partners (AHDP). The new stadium will anchor the New Aloha Stadium Entertainment District (NASED), with the area around the stadium to be developed (as a public-private partnership over a 20-year period) to also include entertainment venues, retail stores, restaurants, housing, hotels, recreational sites, cultural amenities, and green space. As of January 2026, the expected completion date for the new stadium is March 2029. In December 2025, the demolition of Aloha Stadium (a process expected to take nine months) commenced the first phase of the NASED's development.

== Events ==
=== American football ===
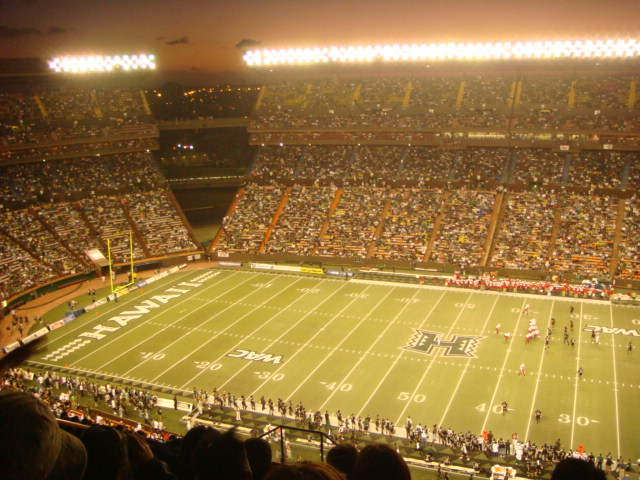
The Hawaii Rainbow Warriors playing at the stadium

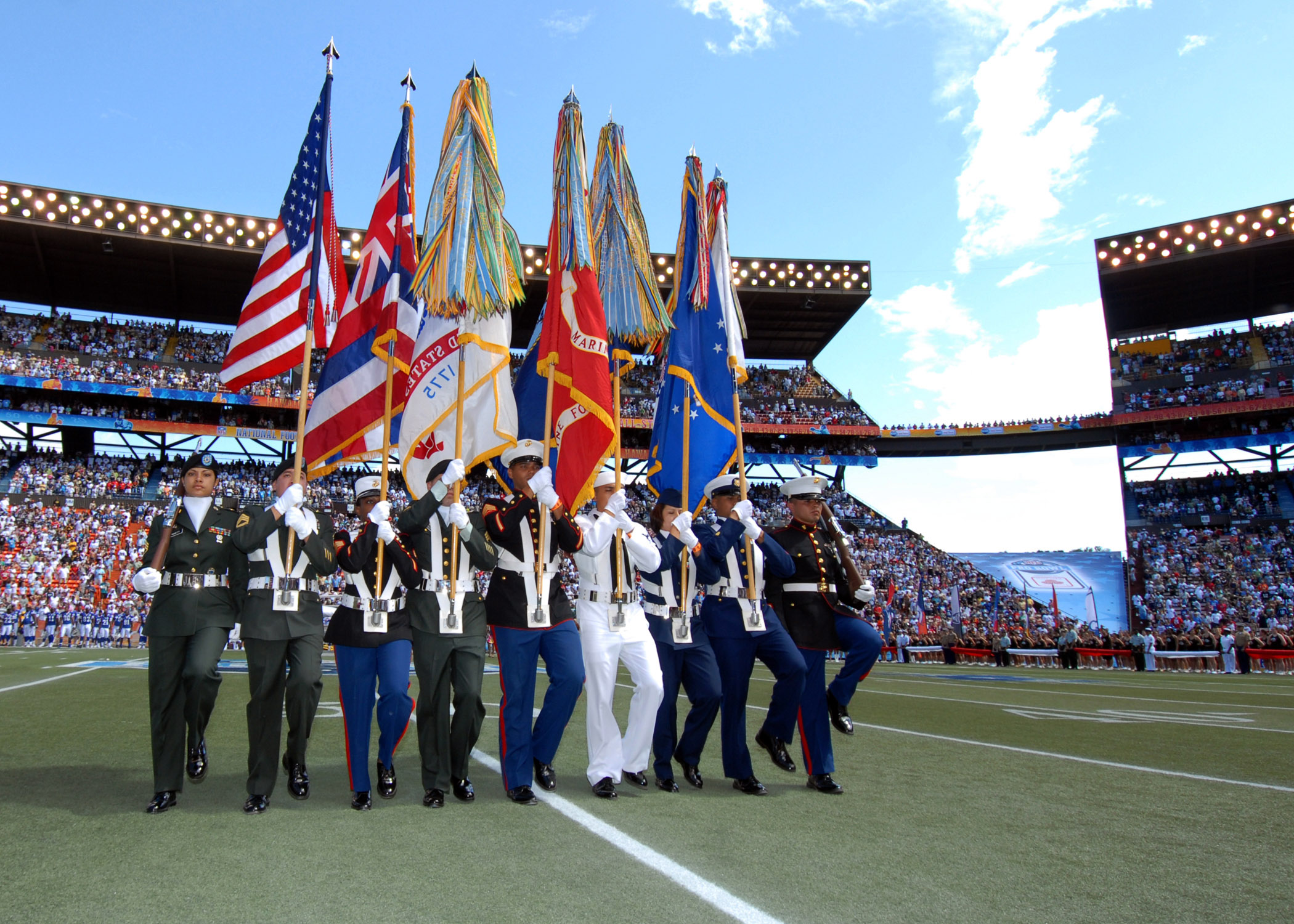
A joint service color guard parades the colors at mid-field during the 2007 Pro Bowl game

==== College football ====
Aloha Stadium served as the home field of the Hawaii Rainbow Warriors college football program, representing the University of Hawaiʻi at Mānoa, from 1975 through 2020.

The Hula Bowl, a college football all-star game, was first played at the stadium in January 1976 and returned to the stadium annually through 1997. It was again held at Aloha Stadium in 2006–2008 and 2020–2021. The 2021 Hula Bowl was the last football game held at the facility before the halting of new events.

Three team-competitive college football bowl games were held annually at the stadium: the Aloha Bowl (1982–2000), Oahu Bowl (1998–2000), and Hawaii Bowl (2002–2019). The Hawaii Rainbow Warriors appeared in the Hawaii Bowl nine times and the other two bowl games once each.

==== Professional football ====
Starting in September 1975, the stadium was home to the World Football League's Hawaiians who averaged just over 16,000 fans while playing their last four home games there before the league disbanded. On August 21, 1976, the San Francisco 49ers and the San Diego Chargers played a National Football League preseason game at Aloha Stadium, with the 49ers prevailing 17–16 in front of a crowd of 36,364. Almost 33 years later, on August 17, 2019, the NFL returned to the stadium with a preseason game between the Los Angeles Rams and Dallas Cowboys, with the Cowboys winning 14–10 before a crowd of 49,936 in what was the final professional football game ever played there.

The NFL's all-star game, the Pro Bowl, was held annually at the stadium a total of 35 times from 1980 through 2016, except in 2010 and 2015. The game was played regularly to capacity crowds averaging nearly 50,000 per game, with the highest recorded attendance being 50,445 at both the 1984 and 1990 games.

=== Baseball ===
The stadium served as the home field for the Hawaii Islanders, a Triple-A team competing in the Pacific Coast League, from 1976 to 1987.

In 1997, a three-game regular season series between St. Louis Cardinals and San Diego Padres of Major League Baseball (MLB) was held at the stadium. Called the Padres Paradise Series, the series was played as a doubleheader on April 19 and a nationally broadcast (ESPN) game on April 20. The Cardinals swept the doubleheader, but the Padres won the final game, 8–2, to avoid the complete sweep. In 1979, the Padres had played a three-game preseason series against the Seibu Lions of Japan's Pacific League at the stadium.

=== Soccer ===
On April 7, 1976, the Aloha Soccer Festival triple-header was held at the stadium. In the feature match, Pelé scored four goals as his New York Cosmos defeated Japanese works team Honda Motors, 5–0, in front of a crowd of 21,705. (In the other matches, the NASL's San Diego Jaws routed the Hawaii All-Stars, 6–0, while the Philippines edged Taiwan, 1–0.)

Encouraged by the tournament's success, the San Antonio Thunder became Team Hawaii in 1977, bringing the NASL to the Aloha State. Pelé and the Cosmos returned on April 13, 1977, as 12,877 watched New York defeat Hawaii, 2–1. (None of Team Hawaii's other twelve home games drew even half of that; they managed only 4,543 per game for the season, and moved to Tulsa in 1978.)

Aloha Stadium hosted the inaugural Pan-Pacific Championship (February 20–23, 2008), a knockout soccer tournament, involving four teams from Japan's J-League, North America's Major League Soccer (MLS) and Australia/New Zealand's A-League. The 2012 Hawaiian Islands Invitational was also held at the venue.

The United States women's national soccer team was scheduled to play a game against Trinidad and Tobago as part of their World Cup Winning Victory Tour at the stadium on December 6, 2015; however, the game was canceled the day before gameday due to concerns over the turf being unsafe to play on.

Date	Score	Competition	Attendance
February 20, 2008	Gamba Osaka (Japan) 1–0 (United States) Los Angeles Galaxy	2008 Pan-Pacific Championship	15,128
February 20, 2008	Sydney FC (Australia) 0–3 (United States) Houston Dynamo	2008 Pan-Pacific Championship	15,128
February 23, 2008	Sydney FC (Australia) 1–2 (United States) Los Angeles Galaxy	2008 Pan-Pacific Championship; Third-place Match	23,087
February 23, 2008	Gamba Osaka (Japan) 6–1 (United States) Houston Dynamo	2008 Pan-Pacific Championship; Final	23,087

=== Rugby ===
On June 2, 2013, the stadium played host to a rugby league test match where Samoa defeated the USA 34–10.

In June, the Brisbane Broncos from the Australasian-based National Rugby League (NRL) competition organized for a rugby league match to be played at Aloha Stadium against NRL rivals Penrith Panthers later in 2015. However, in September the NRL blocked the idea and the game didn't go ahead.

Date	Visiting	Score	Home	Competition	Attendance
June 2, 2013	United States	10–34	Samoa	International Friendly	—
July 19, 2014	United States	18–12	Samoa	International Friendly	—

Aloha Stadium also hosted the Aloha World Sevens.

In 2020 it was proposed that Kanaloa Hawaii, a proposed Major League Rugby (MLR) team, be based at Aloha Stadium after "a few years" in a smaller venue; however, MLR and Kanaloa Hawaii did not reach an agreement for the team to join the league.

=== Graduation ceremonies ===
Aloha Stadium was also the venue for five public high school graduation ceremonies: Radford High School, Mililani High School, Aiea High School, James Campbell High School, and Pearl City High School.

=== Concerts ===
Date	Artist	Opening act(s)	Tour / Concert name	Attendance	Revenue	Notes
February 25, 1984	The Police	—	Synchronicity Tour	—	—	
November 6, 1995	Eagles	—	Hell Freezes Over Tour	—	—	
January 3, 1997	Michael Jackson	—	HIStory World Tour	70,000	—	These were his only US shows that decade. Also, the first person to sell out the stadium.
January 4, 1997	Michael Jackson	—	HIStory World Tour	70,000	—	These were his only US shows that decade. Also, the first person to sell out the stadium.
May 3, 1997	Gloria Estefan	—	Evolution World Tour	—	—	
May 29, 1997	Whitney Houston	Bobby Brown	Pacific Rim Tour	29,118 / 29,118	$1,634,370	Bobby Brown began the show singing his hit tunes. A disguised Whitney sang background vocals for Bobby. Audience members stated that "she came out and the crowd went wild. She sang very well even though she had a cold. She closed the show with 'Step By Step'."
January 23, 1998	The Rolling Stones	Jonny Lang	Bridges To Babylon Tour	54,006 / 60,000	$3,317,190	
January 24, 1998	The Rolling Stones	Jonny Lang	Bridges To Babylon Tour	54,006 / 60,000	$3,317,190	
February 21, 1998	Mariah Carey	—	Butterfly World Tour	30,415 / 30,415	$1,744,210	
January 30, 1999	Janet Jackson	98 Degrees	The Velvet Rope Tour	38,224 / 38,224	$2,664,000	
February 12, 1999	Celine Dion	—	Let's Talk About Love World Tour	22,381 / 22,381	$1,326,805	
June 1, 2000	Tube	—	Tube Live Around Special June.1.2000 in Aloha Stadium	15,000+	—	The band marked their 15th anniversary with their first-ever US show – a day the state commemorated as "TUBE Day".
February 16, 2002	Janet Jackson	Ginuwine	All for You Tour	32,211 / 33,511	$1,472,935	This concert was aired on HBO the following night and later released on DVD and VHS as Janet: Live in Hawaii. Missy Elliott also made a surprise appearance.
December 9, 2006	U2	Pearl Jam; Rocco and the Devils	Vertigo Tour	45,815 / 45,815	$4,486,532	The band's first concert in Hawaii since 1985. Billie Joe Armstrong of Green Day was the special guest.
November 8, 2018	Bruno Mars	The Green; Common Kings	24K Magic World Tour	113,751 / 113,751	$12,394,580	
November 10, 2018	Bruno Mars	The Green; Common Kings	24K Magic World Tour	113,751 / 113,751	$12,394,580	
November 11, 2018	Bruno Mars	The Green; Common Kings	24K Magic World Tour	113,751 / 113,751	$12,394,580	
December 7, 2018	The Eagles	Jack Johnson	All the Light Above it Too World Tour	—	—	
December 8, 2018	Guns N' Roses	—	Not in This Lifetime... Tour	22,485 / 23,000	—	
February 15, 2019	Eminem	—	—	31,621 / 31,621	$3,089,448	

== In popular culture ==
Aloha Stadium appeared in the climax of the 2006 animated television film Leroy & Stitch, the finale film to Lilo & Stitch: The Series and the main continuity of the Lilo & Stitch franchise. In the film's final act, Dr. Hämsterviel and his Leroy army dump Jumba Jookiba's first 624 genetic experiments into the stadium to be destroyed, only for Lilo, Stitch, Jumba, Pleakley, Gantu, and Reuben to arrive and stop Hämsterviel. After a fight between the experiments and the Leroys, the main heroes throw an impromptu concert (initially set up for a fictional event called "Alohapalooza"), performing "Aloha ʻOe" to trigger a failsafe to shut down the Leroys. Although the stadium is not identified by name, it is confirmed to be Aloha Stadium through a special thanks credit in the film's closing credits.

In season three, episode three of the CBS television series NCIS: Hawaiʻi (first aired February 26, 2024), titled "License to Thrill", Aloha Stadium was the setting for a fictional extreme motorsports exhibition, World of Hyperdrome.

== See also ==
- List of NCAA Division I FBS football stadiums

Events and tenants
Preceded by first stadium	Host of the Hawaiʻi Bowl; 2002–2019	Succeeded by Clarence T. C. Ching Athletics Complex
Preceded by Los Angeles Memorial Coliseum; Sun Life Stadium; University of Phoenix Stadium	Host of the NFL Pro Bowl; 1980–2009; 2011–2014; 2016	Succeeded by Sun Life Stadium; University of Phoenix Stadium; Camping World Stadium
Preceded by first stadium	Host of the Pan-Pacific Championship; 2008	Succeeded by Home Depot Center
