= Aloha World Sevens =

The annual Aloha World Sevens rugby tournament brings 24 Under-20 teams from 24 nations to Hawaii to compete in a three-day event that includes cultural showcases from participating countries. The tournament is sanctioned by USA Rugby.

Sevens is a variant of rugby union in which teams are made up of seven players playing seven-minute halves, instead of the usual 15 players playing 40-minute halves.

The Aloha World Sevens rugby tournament takes place at the Aloha Stadium on the island of Oahu. The tournament places 16 top Under-20 male teams from 16 countries against each other and 8 top Under-20 female teams from 8 countries against each other, each vying for the Aloha World Sevens title.

Teams invited to the 2014 Aloha World Sevens tournament, to be held from June 5–7, are from: USA, New Zealand, Australia, South Africa, Samoa, Fiji, Tonga, France, England, Ireland, Wales, Scotland, Kenya, Hong Kong, Argentina, Italy, Japan, China, United Arab Emirates, Brazil, Canada, Philippines, Spain, Portugal, Russia, Uruguay, Georgia, Namibia, Romania, South Korea, Belgium, Zimbabwe, Tunisia, Netherlands, Cook Islands, and American Samoa.

The annual event is organized by AWS Events Group.
