= Code Rebel =

American technology company

Code Rebel Corporation
- Type: Public
- Traded as: Nasdaq: CDRB
- Industry: Computer Software
- Founded: October 20, 2006, in Kahului, Hawaii
- Founder: Arben Kane
- Defunct: May 2016
- Fate: Bankrupt
- Headquarters: Kahului, Hawaii, United States
- Area served: Worldwide
- Key people: Arben Kane; Alex Kukhar; Volodymyr Bykov
- Products: iRAPP iRAPP TS
- Services: Remote Desktop Services; Mac Terminal Services
- Website: www.coderebel.com

Code Rebel Corporation was an American technology company founded by Arben Kane and headquartered in Kahului, Hawaii, United States. The company developed and sold computer software and was best known for its terminal services and virtualization software principally for Apple Inc. products.

Customers included Fortune 500 companies by late 2014, including AT&T, Microsoft, Cisco, IBM, Bloomberg, and the University of California. Code Rebel went public in May 2015, and in early 2016, Code Rebel announced an upcoming merger with Aegis Identity Software, Inc. Code Rebel's shares doubled in market value after the announcement, with the merger made official on March 11, 2016. The company filed for bankruptcy in May 2016.

== History ==
=== Founding and early years (2006-2014) ===
The software technology company Code Rebel was founded by software engineer Arben Kane in 2006, with headquarters in Kahului, Hawaii, United States. Alex Kukhar and Volodymyr Bykov, who became part of the core engineering team, also co-founded the company. Kane became CEO and chairman. The initial idea behind Code Rebel was to create a new object oriented remote access protocol that would allow the user to access a specific application and its active state. The company went on to develop, manufacture, license, support and sell computer software typically related to terminal services and virtualization software for Apple Inc. products. In particular, the company is known for its remote access software application called iRAPP, and a Mac terminal services application called iRAPP Terminal Server (iRAPP TS).

As the company grew, it began catering software to companies such as Intuit, Bloomberg and Wells Fargo. Code Rebel later relocated to the United States mainland, setting up an office in New York City. In October 2010, University of Alabama’s Management Information Systems program announced a partnership with Code Rebel, LLC to create Apple iPod Touch, iPhone, and iPad applications. Kane was supervising around 50 software engineers and designers by 2014, largely in the United States and Europe. Customers included Fortune 500 companies by late 2014, including AT&T, Microsoft, Cisco, IBM, Bloomberg, Lloyds Bank, Merck, Panasonic and IKEA, as well as organizations such as the University of California, University of Texas and University of Missouri.

Code Rebel markets and distributes its software products through both direct sales and a reseller program. The company had a network of 17 resellers in nine countries by 2015. Code Rebel went public in May 2015, in the first IPO for a Hawaii technology company since 2000, and is listed on the Nasdaq stock exchange. By its second day of trading, the company's stock was up over 200% from its initial offering price. Dr. James Canton joined Code Rebel as director in 2015. On July 28, 2015, Code Rebel announced it had acquired ThinOps Resources, for $9.25 million.

External videos
- "Code Rebel CEO Interview". March 30, 2016. Archived from the original on April 2, 2016.

On January 14, 2016, Code Rebel announced that it would likely merge with Aegis Identity Software, Inc., which is a private software company in Colorado that provides "on-premise [sic] and cloud-based identity and access management products and services for the K-12 and higher education markets." After the announcement, Code Rebel's shares doubled in market value. A definitive merger agreement between the two companies was signed on March 11, 2016. Aegis Identity's CEO stated that Aegis would continue to maintain its branding, with the two companies working as a joint operation.

== Technology ==
The company developed a remote access software application called iRAPP and a Mac terminal services application called iRAPP Terminal Server (iRAPP TS). iRAPP allows users to remotely access their Mac desktop through the iRAPP protocol, which allows the user to work simultaneously on both PC and Mac or they can use any RDP (Microsoft's Remote Desktop Protocol) compliant application for the remote access. iRAPP TS allows the user to access multiple virtual desktops on one or multiple Mac machines concurrently, comparable to the Citrix solution for Mac. This focus on Apple solutions contrasts with most terminal services and virtualization providers such as VMware, Red Hat, Microsoft, and Citrix Systems, which have historically offered Microsoft Windows-based solutions.

== Legal ==
In 2005, the owner of Code Rebel, Arben Kane, was associated with the controversial Cherry OS project, but under the name of Kryeziu. Critics alleged that CherryOS contained code grafted from PearPC, which would have been a violation of the GNU General Public License. In March 2011, Code Rebel's competitor Aqua Connect, Inc. filed suit against Code Rebel claiming misappropriation of trade secrets. The Cherry OS controversy was used by Aqua Connect's lawyers in an attempt to discredit Code Rebel and Kane. After partial dismissal, first amendment, and second dismissal, the case was referred to binding arbitration by agreement of the parties. Code Rebel prevailed in the arbitration, and on August 19, 2014, the United States District Court for the Central District of California entered judgment in favor of Code Rebel on all claims, stating “Aqua Connect has failed to establish any act of reverse engineering by Code Rebel or any other illegal act.”

On May 6, 2016, the Securities and Exchange Commission suspended trading of Code Rebel stock until May 19, 2016, so that their previous filings could be examined.

On May 18, 2016 it filed for insolvency according to Chapter 7 of the Federal Bankruptcy Act.

== See also ==
- Remote Desktop Services
- Remote desktop software
- Comparison of remote desktop software
