= Pacific LightNet =

- Company type: Privately held
- Industry: Communications Services
- Founded: March 27, 2001
- Headquarters: Honolulu, Hawaii, United States
- Key people: Jeremy Amen, CEO; Steve White, CFO
- Products: Local & long distance phone service, Internet services, VoIP, wireless Internet access
- Number of employees: less than 100
- Website: pacificlight.net

Pacific LightNet is a locally owned, facilities-based CLEC, providing both voice and data services to its customers in Hawaii. At the core of its products and services is a 10,000 fiber mile submarine and terrestrial fiber optic network connecting the state's six major islands, the only of its kind. Linked to all major submarine cable landing stations throughout Hawaii, the network provides capacity and services to the mainland and the Pacific Rim.

Pacific LightNet provides both local and long-distance phone service, dial-up and broadband Internet access through wireless or DSL, VoIP, and collocation.

== History ==
Pacific LightNet can trace its beginnings to 1986, the original company was called Tel-Net Hawaii which was started by a general contractor out of Bakersfield, California. Tel-Net was limited to providing telecom services via Microwave Radio, and one between the Hawaiian Islands. The company struggled with these restrictions, and in 1995, John Warta lead the acquisition of Tel-Net Hawaii by GST Telecom, GST then acquired several other companies including the largest internet provider Hawaii On-Line, Planet Hawaii, then Turquoise and Interlink. The original company was renamed GST Telecom Hawaii. GST Hawaii was the first company in the state to receive authority to provide local exchange service in competition with GTE Hawaiian Tel (September 1996).

GST Hawaii operated as a subsidiary of GST Corporate through May 2000. On May 12, 2000, citing market conditions, massive debt and the inability to raise additional capital, GST Corporate filed for bankruptcy. In January 2001, Time Warner Telecom purchased significantly all the assets of GST Corporate except for the Hawaiian operation and 12 fibers on parts of the Hawaii Inter-island Fiber Network (10,000 miles of submarine and terrestrial fiber linking the six major islands).

As one of the secured creditors, Tomen America (now owned by Toyota) looked to longtime associate John Warta and his NextNet Investments to turn around the struggling Hawaiian operation. Tomen provided the assets and NextNet provided the management expertise. On March 27, 2001, Tomen and NextNet took over operational control of GST Hawaii as Pacific LightNet, Inc (PLNI). As part of this transaction, PLNI also agreed to purchase Hawaii OnLine (HOL), at the time Hawaii's largest ISP, as part of the overall transaction. When the transaction was closed on October 11, 2001, Tomen and NextNet became the two joint owners of the company.

In 2004, PLNI started operating as Pacific LightNet Communications (PLNC) to confirm that the company is in the communications business. PLNC has commercial operations on Kauai, Maui, Molokai, Oahu, Lanai and the Big Island. PLNC has customers ranging from the largest businesses in Hawaii to the smaller ones and includes the hospitality industry, the military, non-profits as well as the high-tech business park on Maui.

In mid-2005, Pacific LightNet Communications ceased using the word "Communications" in its branding and is now known simply as "Pacific LightNet".

In February 2008, Pacific LightNet filed an application with the state Public Utilities Commission for approval to transfer all of its holdings to SK Telecom Holdings LP.

In 2010, Pacific LightNet was acquired by a Californian venture company, and began doing business as Wavecom Solutions.

In December 2012, Wavecom Solutions was sold to Hawaiian Telcom, the ILEC for Hawaii.
