= Big Island Air =

Tour company

IATA	ICAO	Call sign
-	BIG	BIG ISLE
- Founded: 1985
- Hubs: Kona International Airport
- Fleet size: 2
- Headquarters: Kailua-Kona, Hawaii, USA
- Website: http://www.bigislandair.com

Big Island Air is a small American air tour operator serving Hawaii. It is based at Kona International Airport and visitors can fly over the active Kilauea Volcano, and the landscape and coastline of the Island of Hawaii.

== Fleet ==
- Cessna 208 Caravan
- Cessna Skymaster
- C421 (Golden Eagle)

== Incidents and accidents ==
The most notable accident involving a Big Island Air aircraft was the 1999 crash on the slopes of Mauna Loa, which led to 10 fatalities. The cause of the crash was due to pilot error.
