= James Canton =

James Canton is a futurist and writer. His books include Technofutures, The Extreme Future and Future Smart: The Game Changing Trends that Will Transform Your World. Canton is the director of the Institute for Global Futures in San Francisco.

In 2003 Canton was appointed as an advisor to the National Science and Technology Council on nanoscience, nanoengineering and nanotechnology. He also previously served on the advisory board of MIT's Media Lab Europe, and was the founding Co-Chairman of the Futures and Forecasting Track for Singularity University. Canton currently serves on the Corporate Eco-Forum Advisory Board.

Canton produced the film series The Time Travelers.

== Books ==
- Technofutures: How Leading-Edge Innovations Will Transform Business in the 21st Century (2004) Next Millennium Press ISBN 0-9761081-0-0
- The Extreme Future: The Top Trends That Will Reshape the World in the Next 20 Years (2006) Dutton ISBN 0-525-94938-0
- Future Smart: Managing the Game Changing Trends that will Transform Your World (2015) DeCapo ISBN 978-0-306-82286-5
