= Oahu Ice and Cold Storage Company =

Hawaiian refrigeration company

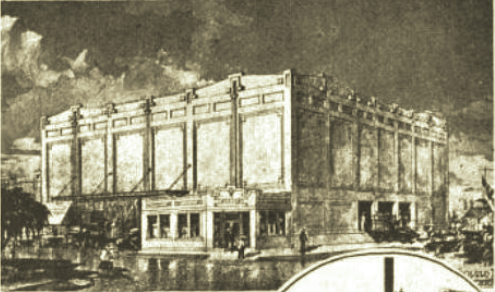
New plant at Hustace and Cooke Streets (1920)

Oahu Ice and Cold Storage Company (originally, Oahu Ice and Electric Company; 1900-1933) was the largest refrigeration company in Hawaii in the early 20th-century. Based in Honolulu and with branches in other locations around Oahu, the company was acquired by the Hawaii Brewing Corporation Ltd in 1933.

== Introduction ==
Ice was first brought to Hawaii in 1850. It was cut from the rivers of Maine, packed in sawdust, and loaded into the hold of a sailing vessel. After a trip of 122 days around Cape Horn, the ship reached Honolulu and discharged its cargo of ice, on September 14, 1850. Business was suspended while everyone went down to marvel at the cold blocks. The ice sold at US$.15 a pound and before the purchasers could get it off the wharf, the weight had considerably diminished. Once each year, the "ice ship" sailed into Honolulu Harbor until the venture proved unprofitable.

In 1871, an ice plant with an output of 3000 pounds daily was established in Honolulu and the luxury was retailed at US$.05 a pound. The first cold storage plant in Hawaii was built by the Hawaiian Electric Company in 1896.

== Early history ==
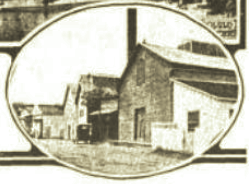
Original plant

At the beginning of the 20th-century, artificial refrigeration was introduced in a modest way. When the Oahu Ice and Cold Storage Company was organized by August Dreier in 1900, under the title of Oahu Ice and Electric Company, it had only 6,000 cubic feet (170 m^{3}) of cold storage space and a maximum output of ten tons of ice daily.

The first storage plant of this company was in operation about 1906. This was added to as necessary. In 1907, when Mr. Dreler organized the holding corporation known as August Dreier, Limited, with August Dreier, F. A. Schaefer, Cecil Brown, J. W. Waldron, and H. Focke as directors, he transferred the ice company to its custody. The business began to grow rapidly, and in 1913, the plant was rebuilt to a capacity of 100,000 cubic feet (2,800 m^{3}) of storage space and 65 tons of ice a day. Further additions in 1914 and 1917 increased the output of ice to 90 tons.

== New plant ==
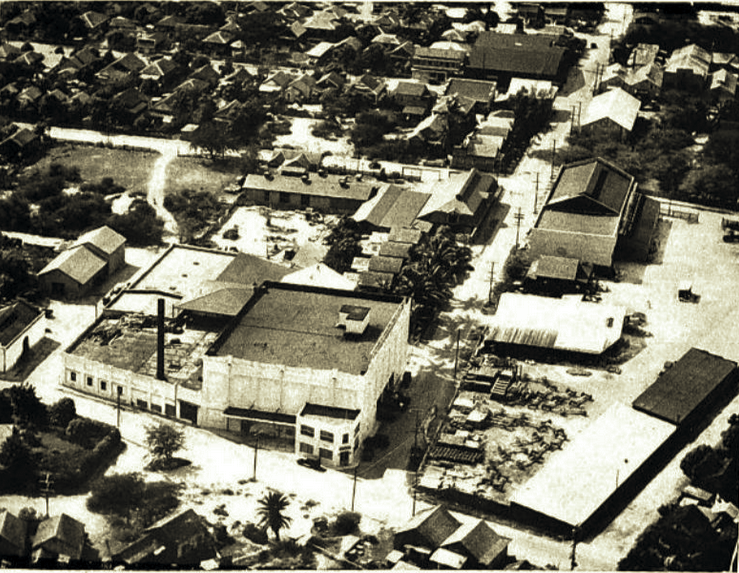
Aerial view (1927)

A name change occurred in early 1920, from the Oahu Ice and Electric Company to the Oahu Ice and Cold Storage Company.

In the same year, construction began on a new, three-story plant at Hustace and Cooke Streets, occupying an entire block in Honolulu's commercial district. The reinforced concrete building was designed by Gardner and Lindberg of Chicago, specialists in cold storage construction, and was built to their plans under the direct supervision of the company's own employees. Construction was completed in 1921. It ran 24 hours a day.

It included facilities for freezing and storing 800 cattle a month, as well as fish, poultry, butter and other perishable comestibles. The freezing room was on the ground floor and the two upper stories were reserved for general cold storage. The plans allowed for additions as needed as the company considered that the future growth of Honolulu promised further expansion, both in its ice and cold storage business. It contained 450,000 cubic feet (13,000 m^{3}) of cold storage space and a daily output of 90 tons of ice.

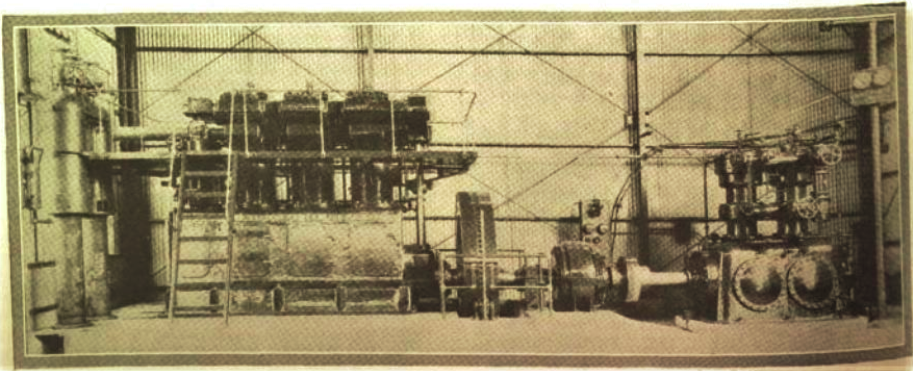
Busch-Sulzer Diesel engine

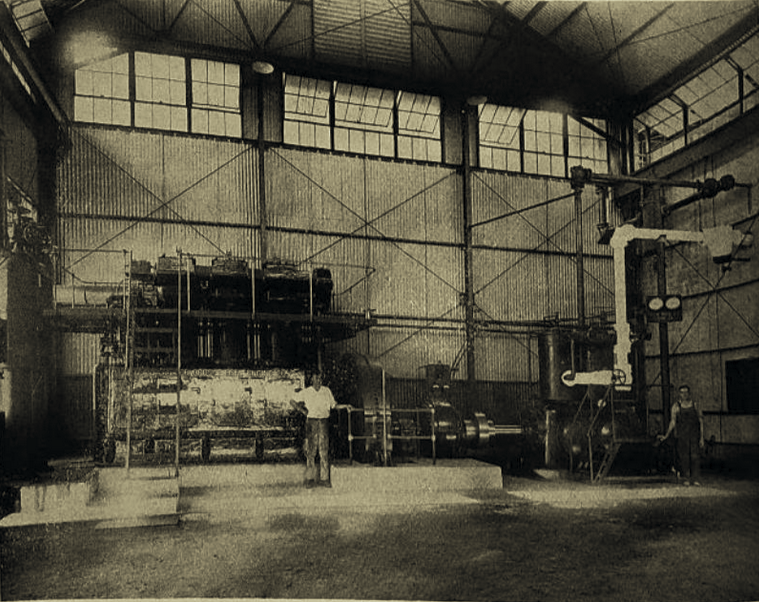
Portion of the engine room (1927)

All the cooling in the cold storage building was by calcium chloride brine, which in turn was cooled in a brine cooler by compressed ammonia. The ammonia compressors, which were also used for ice making, were steam driven. The company had its own steam power-plant and was therefore independent of any outside source of power. A 300 horsepower (220 kW) Busch-Sulzer Diesel engine was installed in 1927 to supplement the steam units. A York ammonia compressor and an Allis-Chalmers generator to furnish electric current within the plant were direct connected with the engine.

In the mid-1920s, storage rates for the Oahu Ice and Cold Storage Company were by the pound, box, case or bag, for each month. Certain articles were given a season rate. Goods in bond during trans-shipment were allowed a special rate, as they were in storage usually only a few days. A very few rooms were rented by the month. During this year, the New Zealand beef used by the U. S. Army, stationed in and around Honolulu, was stored in this warehouse by the contractor. The army also rented two rooms for storing other food supplies. The Oahu Ice and Cold Storage Company was also the U. S. Government's bonded warehouse.

== Branch locations ==
The company maintained branches on the other side of the island of Oahu. One of these cold storage plants was located close to the Kāneʻohe Bay coral gardens. It was supplied with ice which was sent over Nuʻuanu Pali. The Honolulu plant also sent ice by truck to its branch at Waipahu in the midst of the sugar cane plantations 13 miles (21 km) from the city. A third cold storage plant was maintained in Kaimuki, one of Honolulu's residence districts.

== Media ==
The Oahu Ice & Cold Storage Company was a member of the National Association of Ice Industries and made wide use of the National Association literature. The company also carried on a constant newspaper advertising campaign. Because of the cosmopolitan nature of Honolulu's population, many ice consumers were of different nationalities and so a certain proportion of the advertisements were run in different languages.

== Acquisition ==
In 1933, the company was acquired by the Hawaii Brewing Corporation. Renamed the Hawaii Brewing Company in 1962, it was purchased by the Joseph Schlitz Brewing Company in 1964.
