= Bank of the Orient =

Bank catering to Asian Americans

- Company type: Private
- Industry: Finance and Insurance
- Founded: San Francisco (1971)
- Headquarters: California
- Key people: Executive Council; Nancy Li, Eddie Lam, John Curtis
- Products: Banking
- Total assets: $ 933.293 million (March 31, 2021)
- Website: www.bankorient.com

Bank of the Orient (Chinese: 建東銀行) is a bank catering to Asian Americans in the United States.

Headquartered in San Francisco, with branch offices in California, Texas, and Xiamen, the bank is privately held and was established on March 17, 1971.

The first solely owned Asian American bank to be launched in California since World War II, Bank of the Orient was founded by Ernest Go, a Chinese Filipino whose family was successful in the international banking business. The bank originally served the local Chinese and Asian communities in San Francisco, where most of its branch offices are still located today, and with its success, the bank gradually expanded into Hawaii and Texas. The bank sold its Hawaii business to Royal Business Bank in 2022.

Bank of the Orient is one of the first to venture into the growing Chinese market and its Xiamen branch office has been in business since the mid-1990s.
