= Honolulu Cookie Company =

Hawaiian cookie company

- Industry: Unique cookie gifts
- Founded: 1998
- Headquarters: Honolulu, Hawaii, United States
- Number of locations: 17
- Owner: Keith Sung | President + Owner Janet Sung | Vice President + Owner
- Number of employees: 390
- Website: www.honolulucookie.com

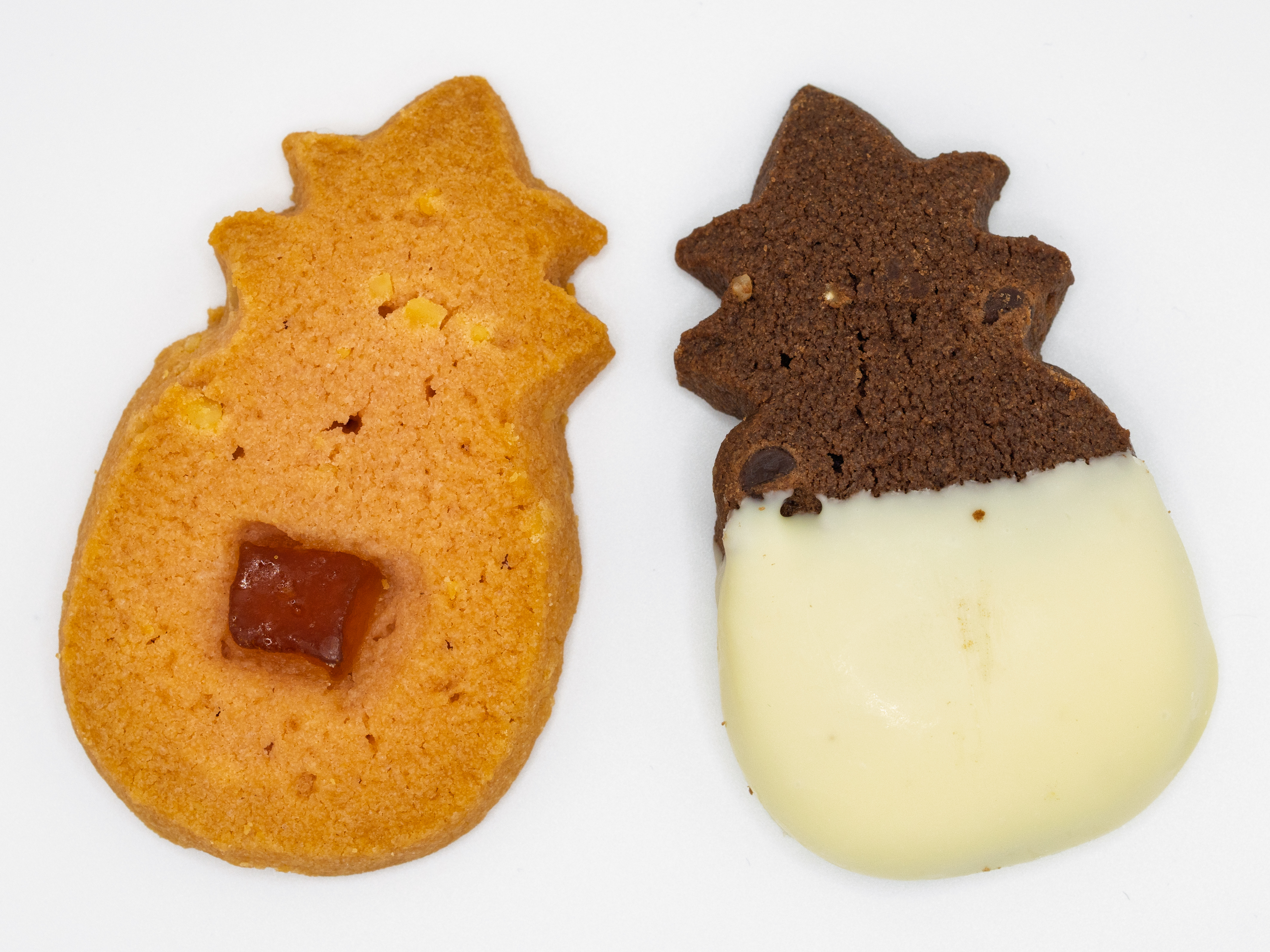
Cookies in the signature pineapple shape. Left: Mango Macadamia. Right: White Triple Chocolate Macadamia

Honolulu Cookie Company is a food and gift producer and retailer based in Honolulu, Hawaii. It was founded in 1998 by Keith and Janet Sung. In 1998, the company began producing shortbread cookies with a signature pineapple shape. The pineapple shape was chosen because of its symbolism of hospitality associated with Hawaii.

== History ==
In 1998, Honolulu Cookie Company introduced its first cookies to the wholesale market. In 2001 the factory and retail store opened in Honolulu, Hawaii. Over the next few years, shops opened all over Oahu, with the Ward Warehouse store in 2002, a store in the Hilton Hawaiian Village in Waikiki in 2003, and a kiosk at Ala Moana Center in 2004. More locations opened in Waikiki in 2007, and the chain expanded to Maui during the same year. The Las Vegas store opened in 2014.

After 2008 it began releasing new flavors, starting with dark chocolate in 2008 and coconut in 2009. Seasonal flavors like Ginger Spice were introduced in 2013, and peppermint was released in 2014. The white chocolate-dipped macadamia cookies were launched in 2015.

In 2010 the company established a wholesale partnership with Duty Free Shops and Neiman Marcus. Their partnership with Tommy Bahama began in 2013, and distribution through Tommy Bahama in Japan began in 2015. Their partnership with Disney and Bloomingdales also began in 2015.

The Honolulu Cookie Company began opening stores in Guam in 2016, and during the same year the pumpkin flavor was introduced.

The guava flavored cookies were introduced in 2017, and became a core flavor with the white chocolate-dipped macadamia cookies in 2018.

As of 2018, the dessert shop has 17 retail stores throughout Hawaii, Guam, and Las Vegas.

== Awards ==
- 2014 Retailer of the Year by the Retail Merchants of Hawaii
- 2015 Innovative Marketing Award at the HFMA Taste Awards
- 2015 INNOVATE HAWAII Manufacturer of the Year award at the HFMA Taste Awards
- 2017 INNOVATE HAWAII Award, Best Chocolate Cookie
