= Island Pacific Energy =

Solar energy provider in Hawaii

- Company type: Private
- Industry: Renewable energy
- Founded: 2007
- Founder: Joseph Saturnia
- Headquarters: Honolulu, Hawaii, U.S.
- Area served: Hawaiian Islands
- Key people: Joseph Saturnia President
- Products: Renewable energy
- Owner: Joseph Saturnia
- Number of employees: 20+ (2013)
- Website: islandpacificenergy.com

Island Pacific Energy is a solar installation company and solar energy facility provider in the State of Hawaii.

== History ==
Island Pacific Energy was founded in 2007 as a solar energy provider. The original headquarters were located at the Manoa Innovation Center. In 2009, Island Pacific Energy moved their offices to the Foreign Trade Zone located at 521 Ala Moana Blvd in Honolulu, Hawaii.

As a solar energy provider, Island Pacific Energy owns, operates and maintains the photovoltaic systems on the roofs of commercial and non-profit entities and sells the clean renewable energy that is generated to the customer under long term power purchase agreements. This arrangement enables customers who cannot take advantage of the incentives (tax credits) to still reap the economic benefits of solar power. Island Pacific Energy was the first company to execute a power purchase agreement with a non-profit entity in the state of Hawaii.

In 2009, the company expanded their offering to include the installation of photovoltaic systems for residential and commercial customers.

Island Pacific Energy currently operates a portfolio of solar energy facilities as well as actively installs photovoltaic systems for residential, commercial, non-profit and government entities.

== Awards and achievements ==
Island Pacific Energy has been the recipient of numerous awards and achievements.

- 2009 Governors Award for Innovation
- 2011 Business Leadership Hawaii Best in Small Business Finalist
- 2012 Pacific Business News Fastest 50 Fastest Growing Small Business

== Commercial installations ==
Island Pacific Energy has provided solar power for an extensive list of companies and organizations throughout Hawaii:

- Hawaiian Electric Company
- Punahou School
- Young Brothers/Hawaii Tug and Barge
- St Louis School
- Chaminade University
- East West Center at University of Hawaii
- Variety School
- Joint Base Pearl Harbor – Hickham

Island Pacific Energy is one of three companies (and the only Hawai‘i company) as the recipient of a $500MM contract to provide solar energy to the United States Navy facilities across the State of Hawai‘i.

== Residential installations ==
Island Pacific Energy installs photovoltaic solar systems for residential customers on Oahu only. Island Pacific Energy offers a variety of financing options including no-money down options where customers use their savings to pay for the systems.

== Memberships and associations ==
Island Pacific energy is an active member of the following organizations:

- Hawaii Solar Energy Association
- Solar Energy Industries Association
- Better Business Bureau
- Building Industry Association of Hawaii
- United States Green Building Council
