= Hawaiian Telcom =

Telephone company in Hawaii, United States

Hawaiian Telcom, Inc.
- Type: Subsidiary
- Industry: Communications Services
- Founded: 1883; 143 years ago
- Headquarters: Honolulu, Hawaii, U.S.
- Key people: Su Shin, President
- Products: Broadband Internet services, Local wireline services, Television
- Owner: Macquarie Infrastructure and Real Assets
- Parent: GTE (1967–2000); Verizon (2000–2005); The Carlyle Group (2005–2010); Hawaiian Telcom Holdco (2010–2017); Altafiber (2018–present)
- Website: www.hawaiiantel.com

Hawaiian Telcom, Inc., is the incumbent local exchange carrier (ILEC) or dominant local telephone company, serving the state of Hawaii. In 2005, Hawaiian Telcom Holdco, Inc., was formed by The Carlyle Group, following its purchase of the Hawaiian Telcom Inc. assets of Verizon Communications. On July 2, 2018, Cincinnati Bell purchased Hawaiian Telcom Holdco, Inc. for $650 Million,

Hawaiian Telcom provides a wide range of consumer, business, wholesale communications and technology services. Service offerings include local phone, long-distance, Internet services (DSL and fiber optic), and television service; along with wireless services such as a mobile virtual network operator. Hawaii operations of Verizon Wireless were not included in the 2004 sale to The Carlyle Group, and Verizon Wireless continues to operate in Hawaii as before the divestiture. Among the company's business offerings are a full range of Internet Protocol services (IP), including Ethernet, high-bandwidth data services, managed services and cloud-based services.

== History ==
=== Early history ===
Hawaiian Telcom was founded in 1883 as the Mutual Telephone Company, chartered under the Kingdom of Hawaii. Herman A. Widemann was a co-founder and the President. The original owner was Archibald Scott Cleghorn, father of Princess Ka'iulani. It was the second telephone company chartered in Hawaii, after the Hawaiian Bell Telephone Company in 1880. The Hawaiian Bell Telephone Company was also founded by Herman A. Widemann. Mutual took over Hawaiian Bell in 1894.

With the acquisition of the phone service of the Hawaiian Pineapple Company on the island of Lanaʻi, Mutual owned the phone system of the Hawaiian islands. Mutual changed its name to Hawaiian Telephone Company in 1954, with J Ballard Atherton as company president.

In 1967 Connecticut-based GTE Corp. acquired Hawaiian Telephone and renamed it GTE Hawaiian Tel. After the 2000 merger of GTE with New York–based Bell Atlantic, forming Verizon Communications, GTE Hawaiian Tel became Verizon Hawaii.

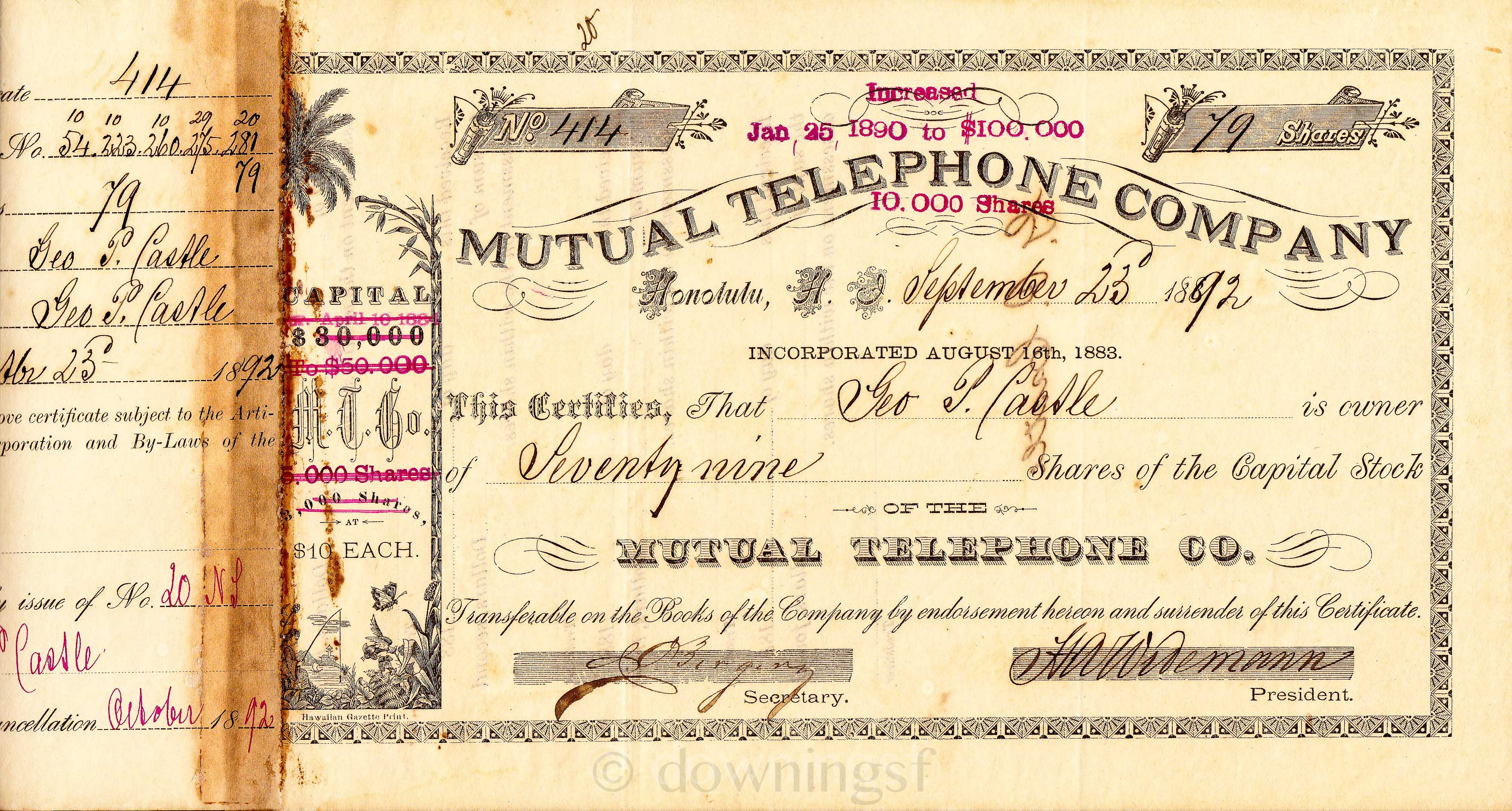
Original company stock certificate

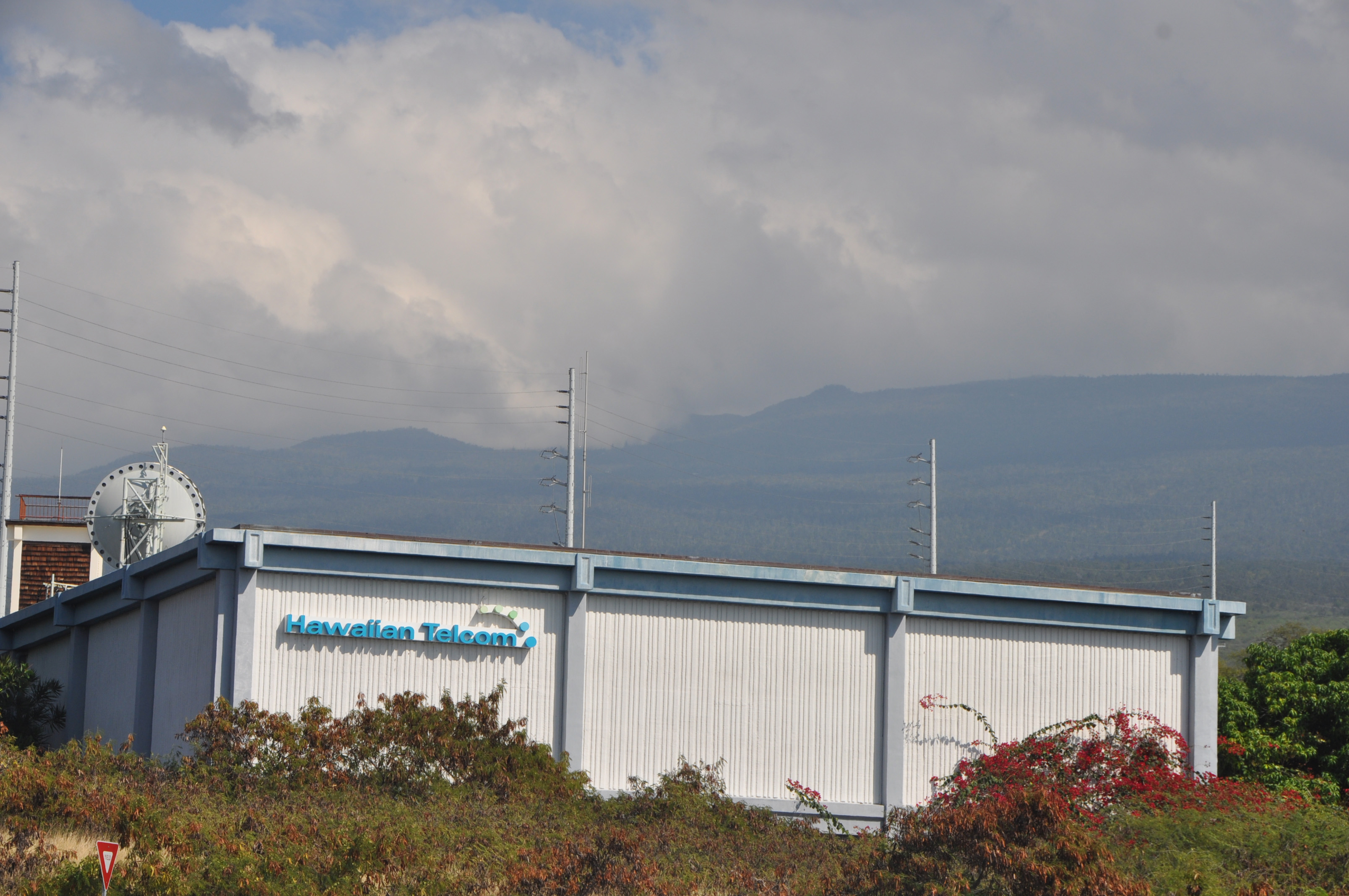
A Hawaiian Telcom facility in Kailua Kona, HI, USA

=== Carlyle Group Ownership ===
In 2004 Verizon Communications finalized a deal to sell Verizon Hawaii to the Washington, D.C.–based investment firm The Carlyle Group. At the time, Carlyle's purchase of Verizon Hawaii was quite controversial with the public and competitive local exchange carriers, Time Warner Telecom and Pacific LightNet, who had doubts about Carlyle's lack of experience operating telecommunication businesses, and their intentions as to raising rates, upgrading the network with optical fiber as former-parent Verizon was doing on the mainland, and possible resale of the business in just a few years, all seen as being detrimental to the public interest.

Upon disconnecting from Verizon's back-office systems in April 2005, the company experienced difficulties transitioning to its own systems. Issues ranged from extremely long hold times to speak to representatives, to duplicate and delayed bills. In February 2007, the company announced that it had reached a settlement with its original systems consultant, BearingPoint, and had hired a new contractor, Accenture, to complete the transition to the new systems.

Hawaiian Telcom announced on February 4, 2008, that it was replacing CEO Michael Ruley with turnaround expert Stephen F. Cooper, chairman of Kroll Zolfo Cooper. Cooper's previous management engagements include Enron and Krispy Kreme.

On May 8, 2008, the company named Eric Yeaman as its new CEO, succeeding interim CEO Cooper. Yeaman previously served as chief operating officer of Hawaiian Electric Company, the electric utility serving the island of Oahu. The company also announced that Walter Dods, former president of First Hawaiian Bank and one of several local investors in Hawaiian Telcom, was assuming the role of chairman of the board.

=== Bankruptcy and Public Listing ===
On December 1, 2008, the company filed for Chapter 11 bankruptcy after missing an interest payment on its debt.

With the bankruptcy, The Carlyle Group's ownership had been reduced to a small stake. In November 2009, Cerberus Capital Management announced to the bankruptcy court that it had acquired $7.6 million of Hawaiian Telcom's debt.

The company's plan to reduce its debt by more than $800 million was approved by Judge Lloyd King of the U.S. Bankruptcy Court on November 13, 2009. The plan required approval by the Hawaii Public Utilities Commission. After leaving bankruptcy, the company's stock became publicly traded on the NYSE in 2010, moving to NASDAQ in 2011.

=== Product Evolution ===
On June 24, 2011, The State of Hawaii Department of Commerce and Consumer Affairs issued a 15-year cable franchise license to Hawaiian Telcom, thus ending Oceanic Time Warner's 35-year monopoly as the state's sole cable TV provider. Hawaiian Telcom launched the service on July 1, 2011, after a year of testing in the Honolulu area. Island-wide service began in 2012.

In 2014, Hawaiian Telcom launched 500 megabits per second broadband after investing $125 million in its fiber optic network.

=== Acquisition by Cincinnati Bell ===
On July 10, 2017, Cincinnati Bell announced it would acquire Hawaiian Telcom Holdco, Inc., parent of local telephone company Hawaiian Telcom for $650 million. The sale received the approval of the Hawaii Public Utilities Commission (PUC) in April 2018 and was completed in July 2018.

Following the completion of the sale to Cincinnati Bell, the company announced that John Komeiji had been promoted to the role of president and general manager. Komeiji had previously served as chief administrative officer and general counsel.

On January 7, 2020, Su Shin was promoted to the position of president and general manager following Komeiji's resignation to assume the post of general counsel at Kamehameha Schools.

In September 2021, Cincinnati Bell was acquired by Macquarie Infrastructure and Real Assets.

== See also ==
- List of United States telephone companies
