= Phase2 International =

Defunct American cloud computing provider

Phase2
- Industry: Software development
- Fate: Defunct
- Headquarters: Honolulu, Hawaii, US
- Website: www.phase2.com

Phase2 International , Phase 2, was a privately owned, US-based cloud computing provider headquartered in Honolulu, Hawaii. The company offered hosted business software and cloud servers, including information technology knowledge, security, compliance, and an integrated suite of software applications on a customizable monthly subscription basis. Phase 2 served the Federal, SMB, and enterprise markets, providing access to IBM, Microsoft and other business software.

== Background ==
Phase 2 International's stated mission was to participate in the ongoing business-software environment's transformation from purchased to cloud software models. In April 2008, the company introduced a reseller program to supplement its application offerings. Phase2's CEO was Kevin Doherty.

== Products ==
The company's hosted offerings included IBM Lotus Notes, IBM Connections, IBM Lotus Sametime, and IBM WebSphere Portal. It also hosted Microsoft SharePoint, Microsoft Exchange, Microsoft Team Foundation Server, and Microsoft Project Server. Other products offered were Cloud Servers (Windows, Linux, Domino), and Security Hardened Cloud Servers with FISMA, HIPAA, and GLBA compliance.
