= Hawaiian Financial Federal Credit Union =

Hawaiian Tel Federal Credit Union
- Company type: Credit union
- Industry: Financial services
- Headquarters: Honolulu, Hawaii,
- Website: hificu.com

Hawaiian Financial Federal Credit Union (formerly known as Hawaiian Tel Federal Credit Union) is a member-owned financial institution (Credit Union) in Honolulu, Hawaii. The credit union is administered and regulated by the National Credit Union Administration (NCUA) and insured by the National Credit Union Share Insurance Fund (NCUSIF). Hawaiian Financial Federal Credit Union is the fourth largest credit union in Hawaii. As of 2012, it has a total of $512.3 million USD in assets, serving more than 50,000 members, and seven office branches. As of March 2018, the President of the credit union is Norman Okimoto. HiTel FCU is guided by the principle, "We are people helping people make their dreams come true by being their financial institution of choice."

== History ==
In October 22, 1936, Mutelco Oahu Employees Federal Credit Union was formed by 65 employees of Mutual Telephone Company. In 1954, the credit union officially changed its name to Hawaiian Tel Employees Federal Credit Union (HTEFCU). Although operating with only volunteers and unpaid staff, the credit union was successful in reaching $1 million USD in assets in the next year and $2 million USD in assets by 1961. In addition, HTEFCU extended their operations to the neighbor islands of Hawaii. In 1971, the credit union officially became a completely independent entity from the phone company while continuing to serve the company’s employees and their families as well as other members.

Throughout the 1980s, HiTel FCU continued its dynamic growth into a full service financial provider while keeping quality member service as its focal point. Services, products and programs were developed and implemented to meet the ever-changing needs of the membership. In 1999, HTEFCU changed its field of membership to serve Oahu's community and their families.

At the Credit Union’s 2003 Annual Meeting, it was announced that the word “Employees” had been removed from its name, and that the organization’s new name would officially be Hawaiian Tel Federal Credit Union.

The company renamed itself again in August 2018 as "Hawaiian Financial Federal Credit Union."

== Membership ==
Hawaiian Financial Federal Credit Union's primary field of membership shall be limited to those having the following common bond:

- Persons who live, work in, worship, or go to school in and businesses and other legal entities located on the Island of Oahu, Hawaii and Maui County;
- Members of record of Hawaiian Financial Federal Credit Union as of the effective date of the approval of its community charter on June 14, 1999, to include the Island of Oahu, Hawaii;
- Others living in the same household under the same roof;
- Members of their immediate families, including foster & adopted children;
- Organizations of such persons.
