= Oʻahu =

Third largest island in Hawaii

Nickname: Gathering Place
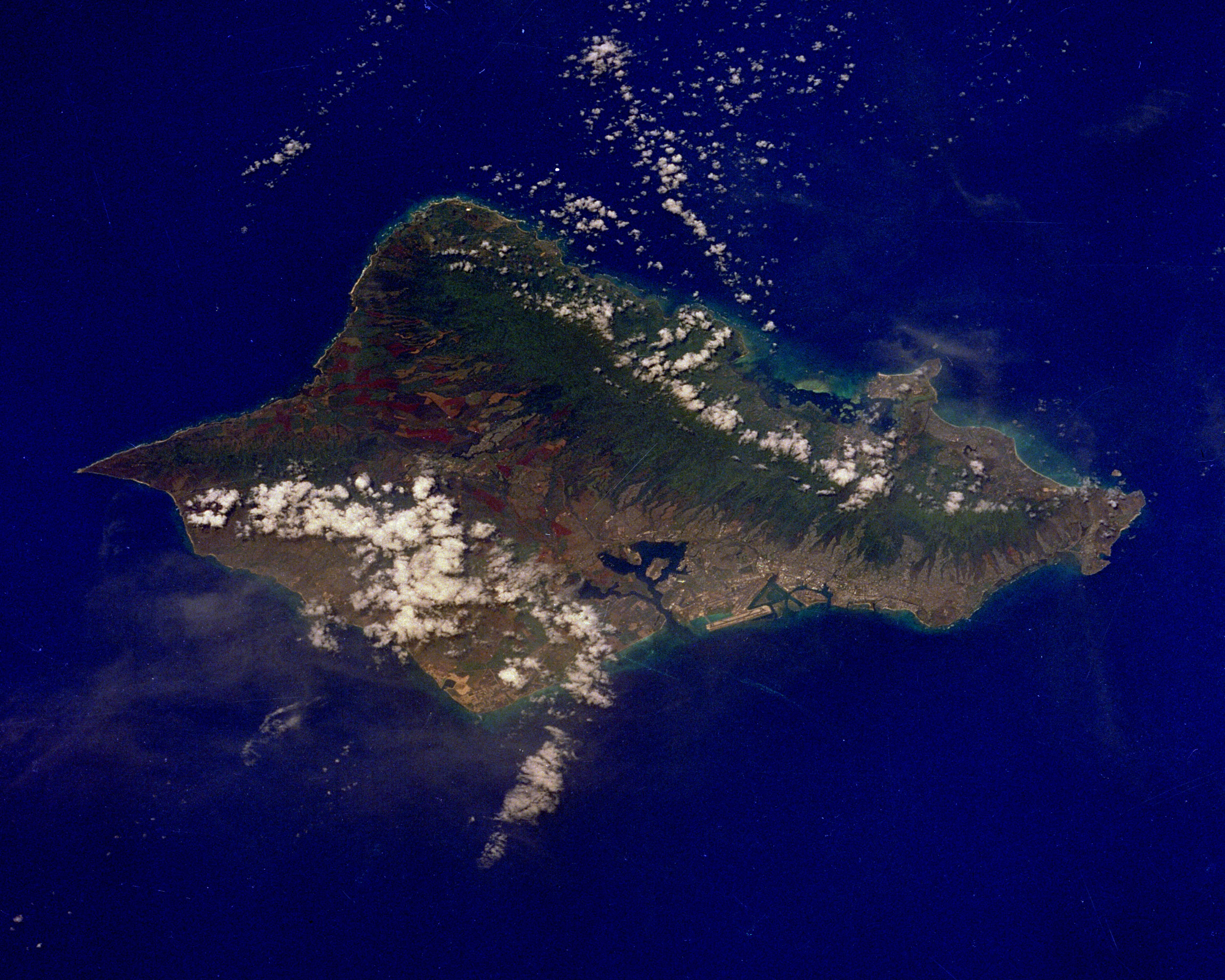

Geography
- Location: 21.5°N 158.0°W
- Area: 596.7 sq mi (1,545 km^{2})
- Area rank: 3rd largest Hawaiian Island
- Highest elevation: 4,025 ft (1226.8 m)
- Highest point: Kaʻala

Administration
- United States
- Symbols
- Flower: ʻilima
- Color: Melemele (yellow)
- Largest settlement: Honolulu

Demographics
- Population: 1,016,508 (2020)
- Pop. density: 1,704/sq mi (657.9/km^{2})

Fly-around tour of the island

Oʻahu, (Note: /oʊˈɑːhuː/; Hawaiian: [oˈʔɐhu]) sometimes written Oahu, is the third-largest and most populated island of the Hawaiian Islands and of the U.S. state of Hawaii. The state capital, Honolulu, is on Oʻahu's southeastern coast. The island of Oʻahu and the uninhabited Northwestern Hawaiian Islands constitute the City and County of Honolulu. In 2025, Oʻahu had a population of 988,703, a decline of 27,791 (▼2.7%) from 1,016,494 in 2020 (approximately 70% of the total 1,455,271 population of the Hawaiian Islands, with approximately 81% of those living in or near the Honolulu urban area).

Oʻahu is 44 miles (71 km) long from east to west and roughly 30 mi (48 km) across its longest north-south distance. Its shoreline is 227 mi (365 km) long. Including small associated islands such as Ford Island, plus those in Kāneʻohe Bay and off the eastern (windward) coast, the area of Oʻahu is 596.7 square miles (1,545.4 km^{2}), making it the 20th-largest island in the United States.

Well-known features of Oʻahu include Waikīkī, Pearl Harbor, Diamond Head, Hanauma Bay, Kāneʻohe Bay, Kailua Bay, and the North Shore.

== Name ==
The Island of Oʻahu is often nicknamed (or translated as) "The Gathering Place". The translation of "gathering place" was suggested as recently as 1922 by Hawaiian Almanac author Thomas Thrum. Thrum possibly ignored or misplaced the ʻokina (ʻ), because the Hawaiian phrase ʻo ahu could be translated as "gathering of objects" (ʻo is a subject marker, and ahu means "to gather"). The term Oʻahu has no other confirmed meaning in Hawaiian.

== History ==
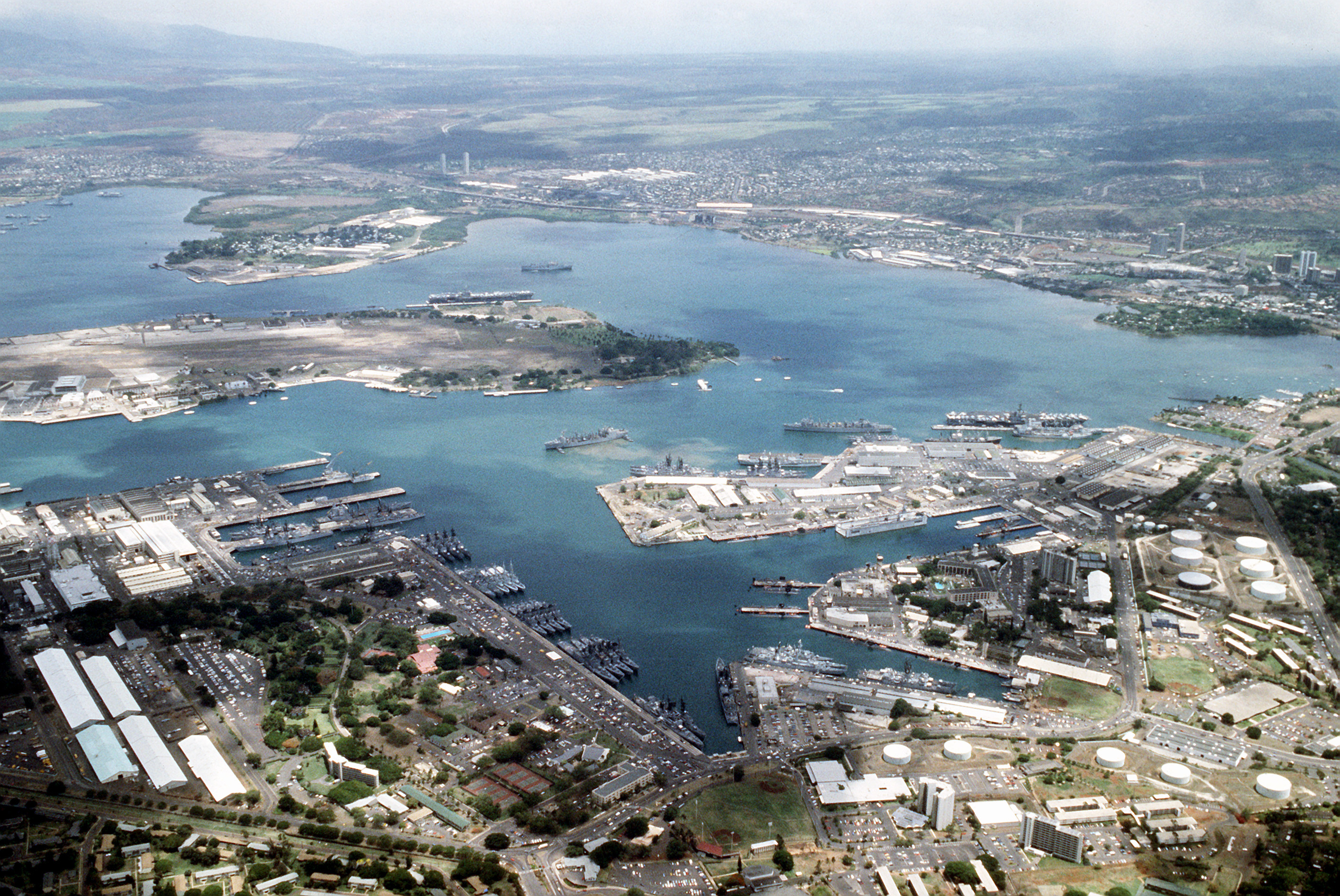
Pearl Harbor is the home of the largest U.S. Navy fleet in the Pacific. The harbor was attacked on December 7, 1941, by the Japanese Empire, bringing the United States into World War II.

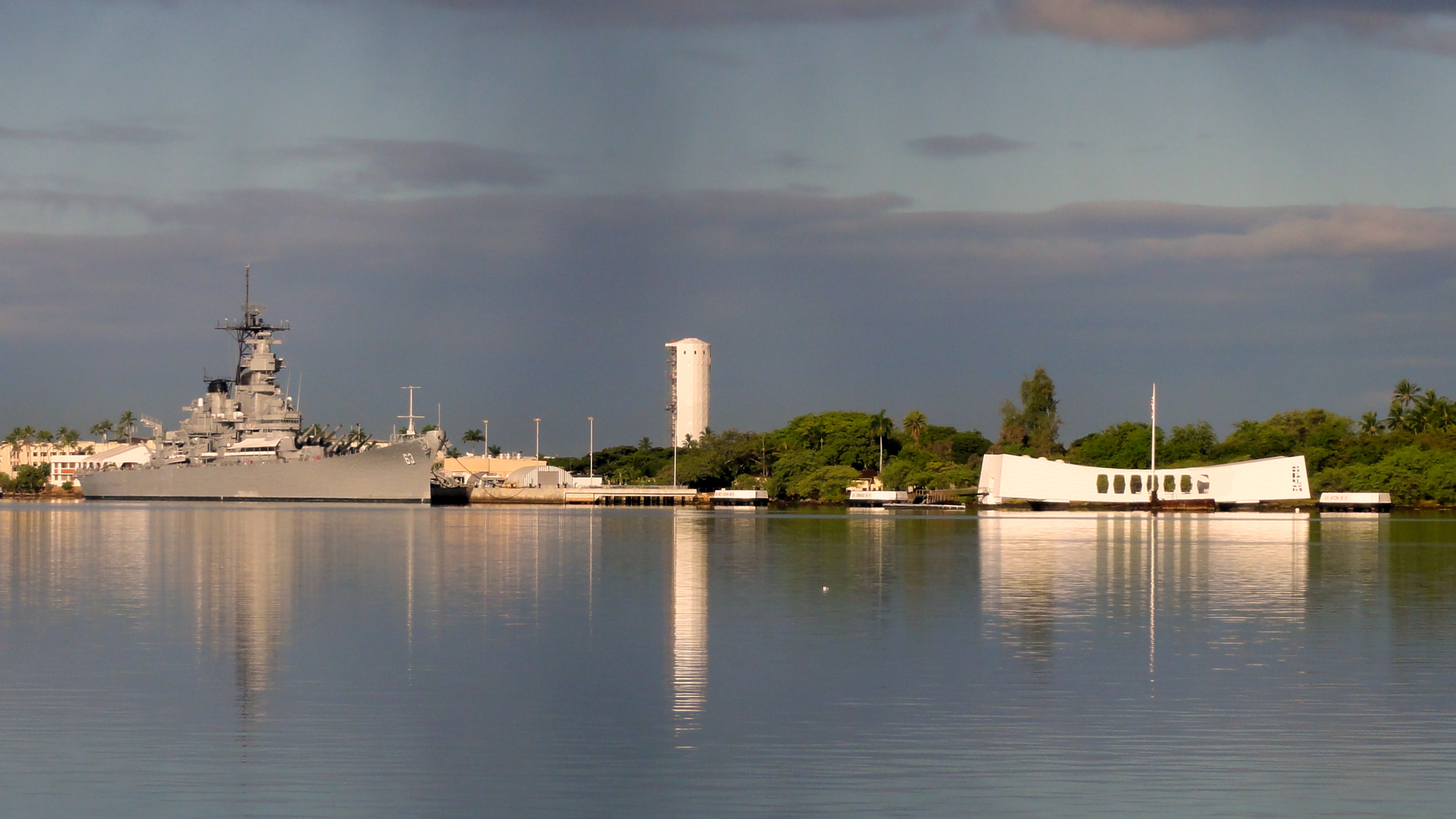
USS Arizona Memorial (right); USS Missouri (left) in Pearl Harbor

It is uncertain when Oʻahu was first settled by humans. Early archaeological studies suggested that Polynesian explorers from the Marquesas may have arrived as early as the 3rd century A.D., possibly with a second wave arriving from Tahiti around 1100 A.D. However, more modern analyses indicate that the first settlers probably arrived around 900–1200 A.D.

The first great king of Oʻahu was Maʻilikūkahi, the lawmaker, who initiated a 304-year dynasty of monarchs. Kualiʻi was the first of the warlike kings and was succeeded by his sons. In 1773, the throne fell upon Kahahana, the son of Elani of Ewa.

On January 19, 1778, Oʻahu was the first of the Hawaiian Islands to be sighted by Captain James Cook during his third voyage of discovery. This was the first recorded encounter of the Hawaiian Islands by non-Polynesian people. Cook bypassed Oʻahu, landing instead at Kauai before continuing his original mission to explore the coast of North America. The next year, on February 27, 1779, Cook's second in command, Captain Charles Clerke, became the first recorded non-Polynesian to visit Oʻahu when he landed at Waimea Bay. Earlier that month, Cook had been killed at Kealakekua Bay on the island of Hawaiʻi when a dispute with the local people turned violent. Clerke's visit to Oʻahu was brief and the expedition's two ships left Waimea Bay the same day after finding it difficult to obtain fresh water.

At the time of Cook's visit, the Hawaiian Islands were divided among several warring chiefdoms. In 1783, Kahekili II, king of the island of Maui, conquered Oʻahu. He then made his son, Kalanikūpule, king of Oʻahu, turning it into a puppet state. Kalanikūpule was later defeated in the Battle of Nuʻuanu in 1795 by Kamehameha I who then founded the Hawaiian Kingdom. The Hawaiian islands were not fully unified until King Kaumualiʻi surrendered the islands of Kauaʻi and Niʻihau in 1810.

By the late 18th century, Waikīkī was a major settlement on Oʻahu, serving as Kahekili II's residence after 1783. However, as trade with foreigners intensified, the nearby town of Honolulu came to eclipse it in size and importance due to its more accessible harbor. In 1845, Kamehameha III moved his capital to Honolulu from Lahaina on the island of Maui. Later, King Kalākaua had a modern residence built in Honolulu for the royal family — the ʻIolani Palace, which still stands as the only royal palace on American soil. In January, 1893, a group of leading American businessmen took up arms near ʻIolani Palace and, along with United States Marines from the USS Boston that landed in Honolulu harbor, launched a successful coup d'état against Queen Liliʻuokalani. The insurgents abolished the monarchy and established the Republic of Hawaii, which later successfully lobbied the United States government for annexation to the United States.

On the morning of December 7, 1941, the Imperial Japanese Navy launched a surprise attack on Pearl Harbor, Oʻahu, bringing the United States into World War II. The attack was aimed at destroying the American will to fight and forcing the US to sue for peace. They attacked the Pacific Fleet of the United States Navy and its defending Army Air Forces and Marine Air Forces. The attack damaged or destroyed 12 American warships, destroyed 188 aircraft, and killed 2,335 American servicemen and 68 civilians (of those, 1,177 were the result of the destruction of the USS Arizona alone).

After World War II, Oʻahu became a tourism and shopping destination with more than five million visitors per year, mainly from the contiguous United States and Japan.

== Geography and climate ==
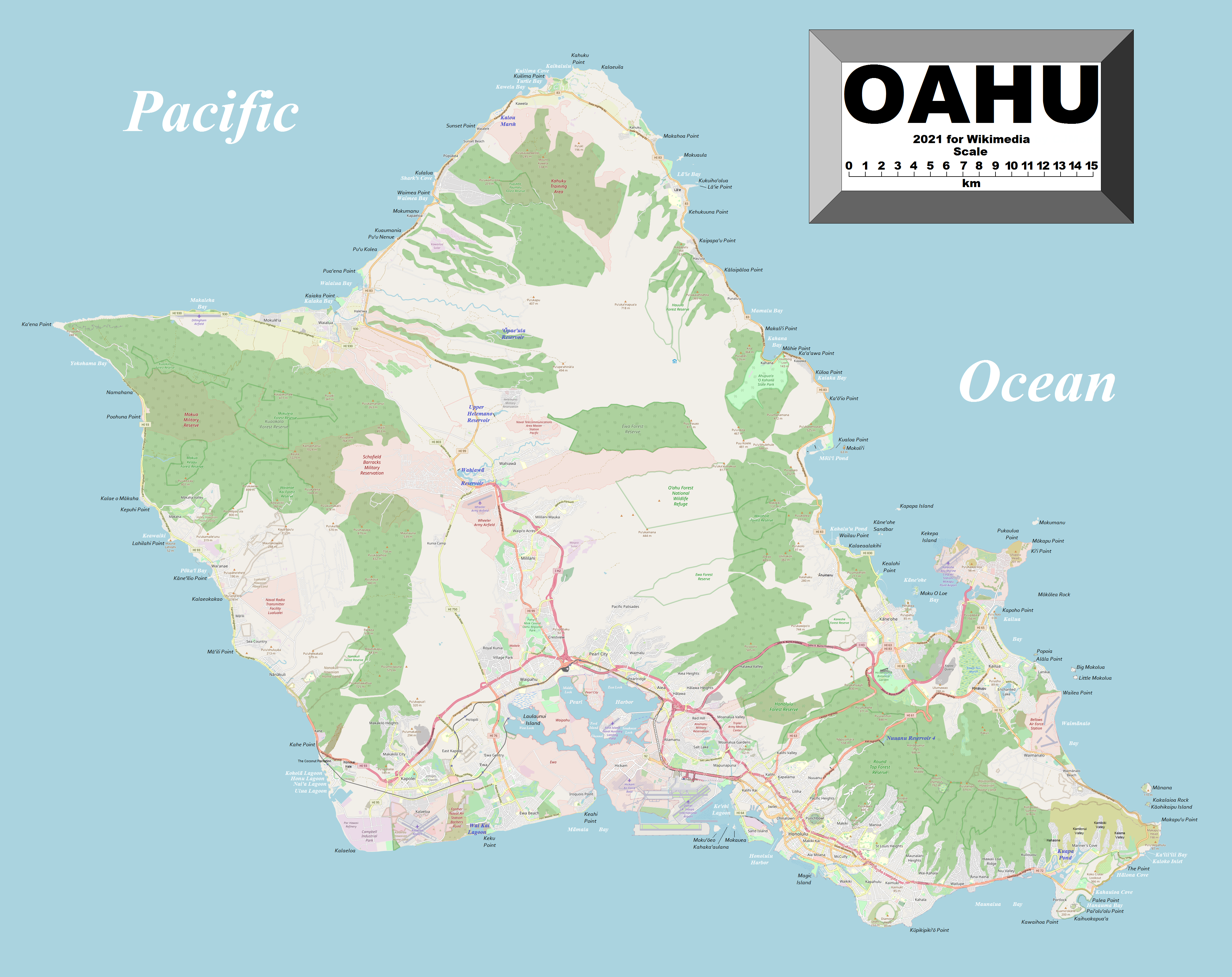
Enlargeable, detailed map of Oʻahu

Like all other Hawaiian Islands, Oʻahu was formed from the volcanism associated with the Hawaii hotspot; it started to grow from the sea floor 4 million years ago. Today, the island is composed of the remnants of two extinct and extensively eroded shield volcanoes: the Waiʻanae and Koʻolau Ranges, with a broad valley or saddle between them. The highest point is Kaʻala in the Waiʻanae Range, rising to 4,003 feet (1,220 m) above sea level.

Oʻahu is known for having the longest rain shower in recorded history. Kāneʻohe Ranch reported 247 straight days of rain from August 27, 1993, to April 30, 1994. The average temperature in Oʻahu is around 70–85 °F (21–29 °C). The island is the warmest from June through October. The winter is cooler, but still warm, with an average temperature of 68–78 °F (20–26 °C).

Oʻahu

Climate chart (precipitation, max. and min. temperature)
J	F	M	A	M	J	J	A	S	O	N	D
14 27 18	27 27 19	105 27 17	2 30 19	6 29 18	2 31 21	8 30 22	10 28 18	2 28 23	95 28 21	21 28 21	25 25 20
- █ Average max. and min. temperatures in °C
- █ Precipitation totals in mm
Imperial conversion
J	F	M	A	M	J	J	A	S	O	N	D
0.6 81 64	1.1 81 66	4.1 81 63	0.1 86 66	0.2 84 64	0.1 88 70	0.3 86 72	0.4 82 64	0.1 82 73	3.7 82 70	0.8 82 70	1 77 68
- █ Average max. and min. temperatures in °F
- █ Precipitation totals in inches

== Tourism ==
Oʻahu, along with the rest of the State of Hawaii, relies on tourism as a driving force of the local economy. Popular tourists attractions include beaches such as Ala Moana Beach, Hanauma Bay, Kāneʻohe Bay, Ko Olina Beach Park, Waikīkī Beach, among others. Other tourist attractions include Ala Moana Center, Bishop Museum, the Honolulu Museum of Art, ʻIolani Palace, Diamond Head, and Kualoa Ranch.

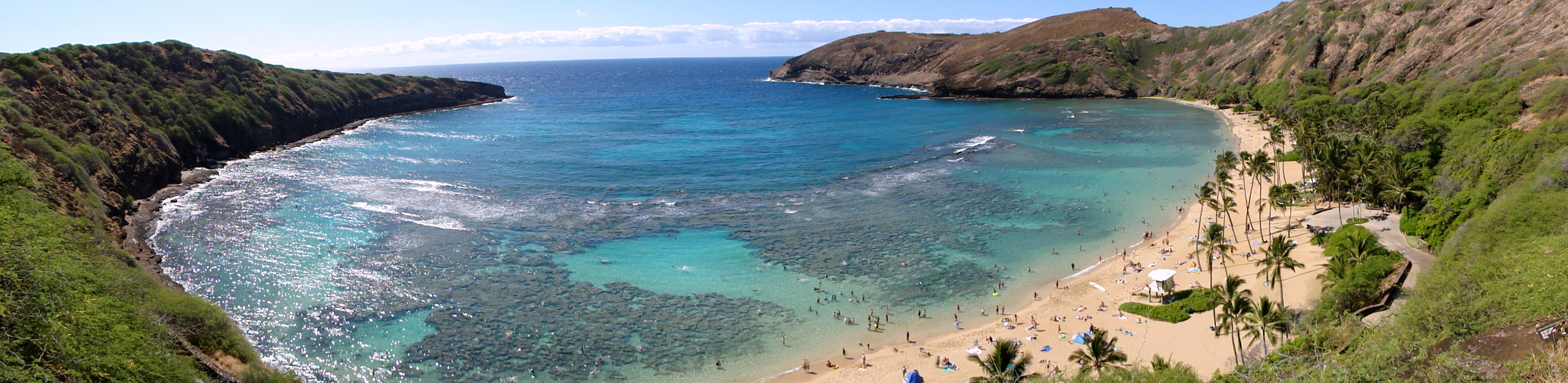
Hanauma Bay
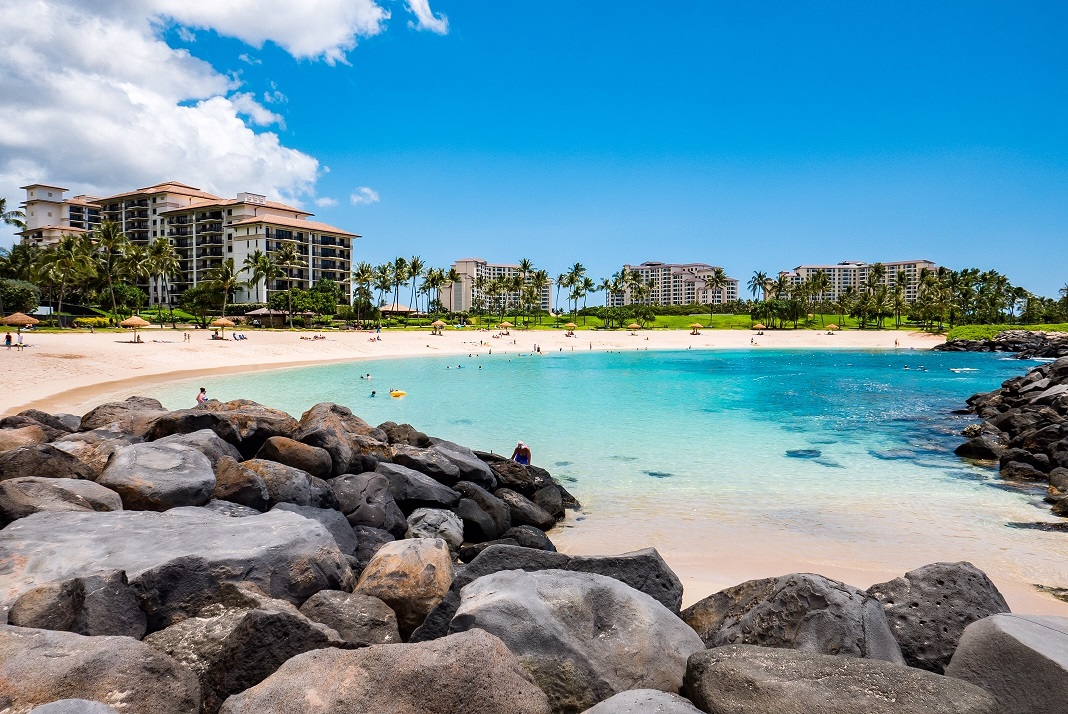
Ko Olina white sand lagoon

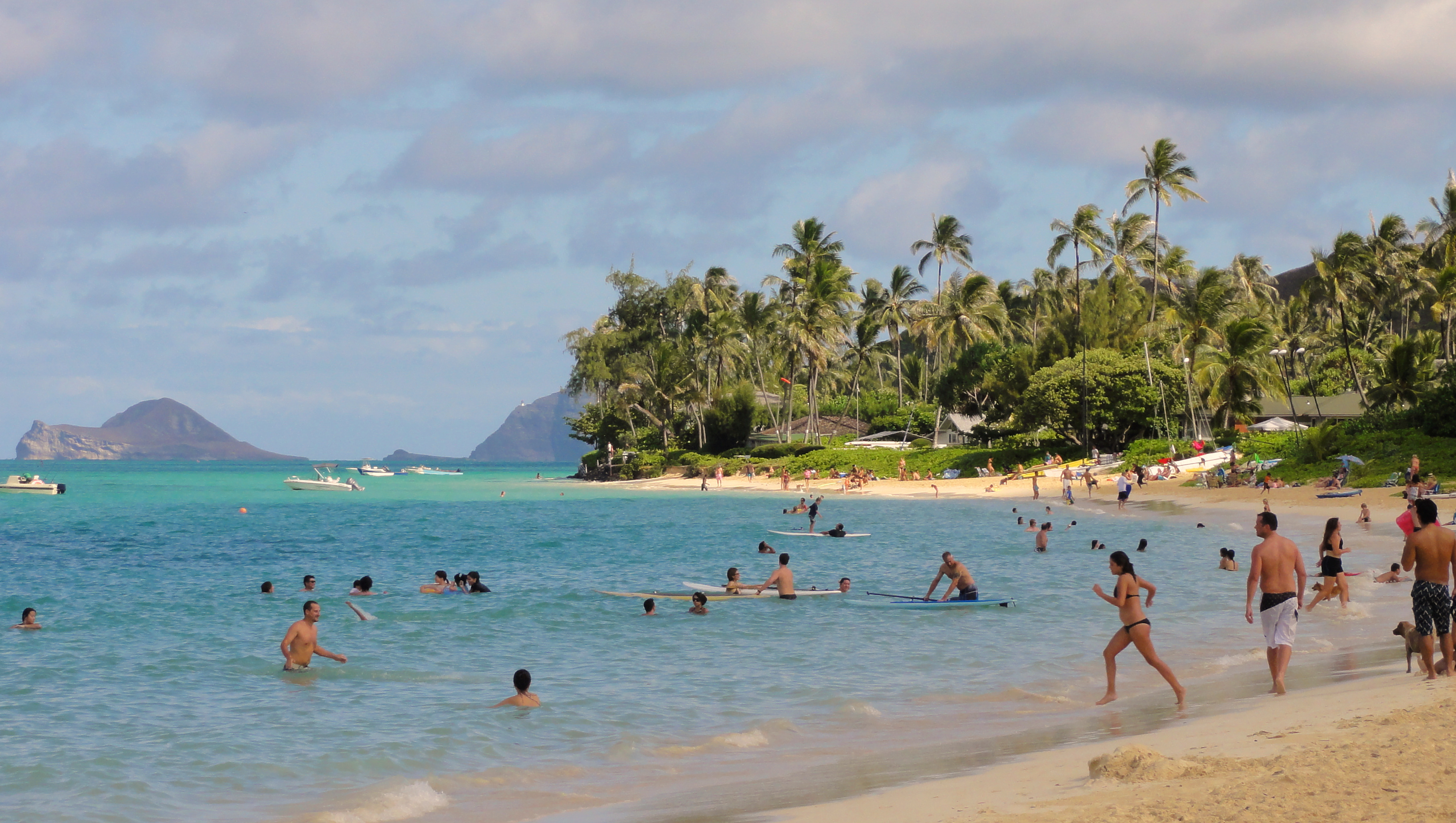
Lanikai Beach

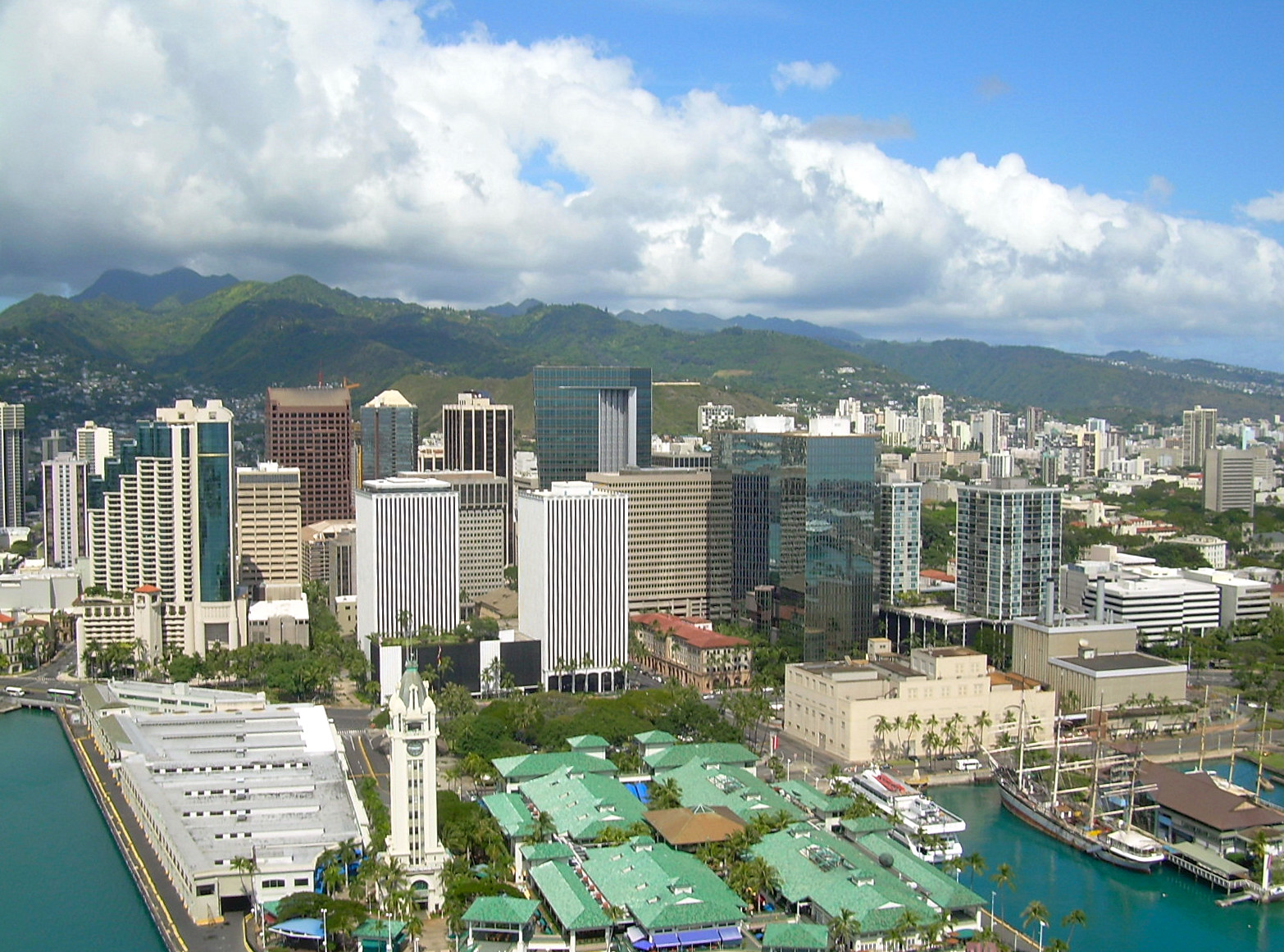
Downtown Honolulu

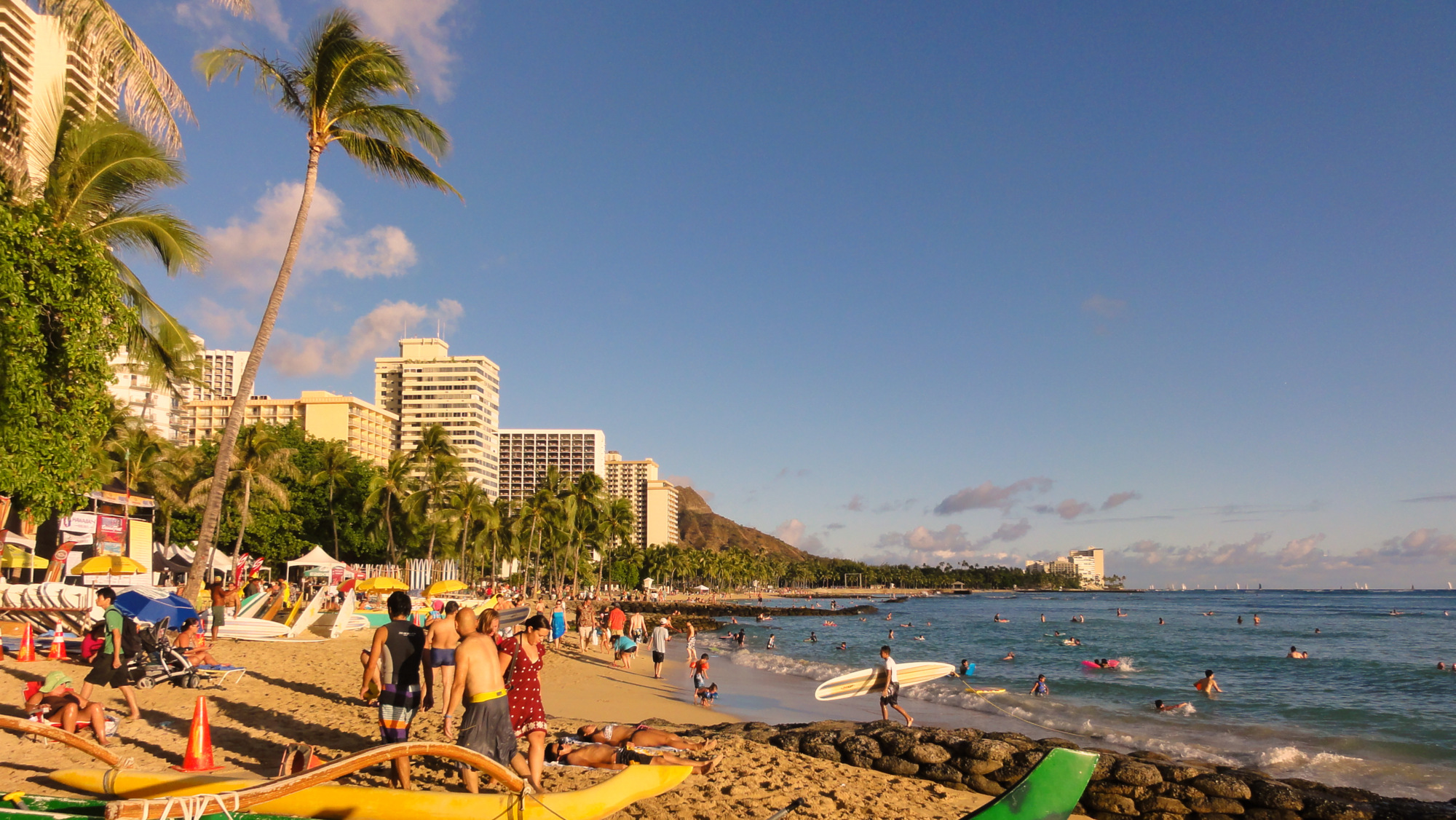
Waikīkī Beach is one of the most well-known beaches in the world

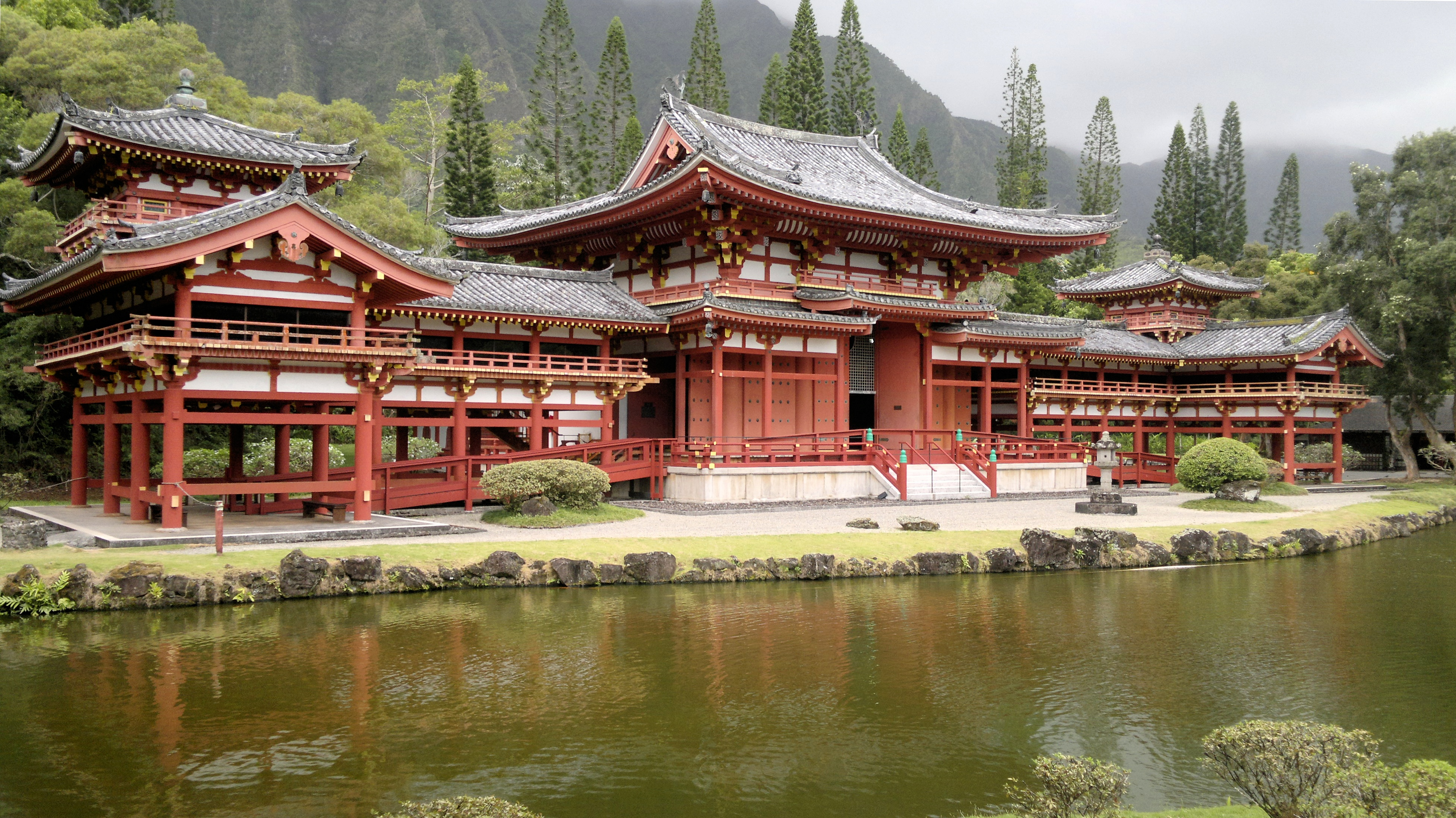
Valley of the Temples Memorial Park near the island's eastern shore

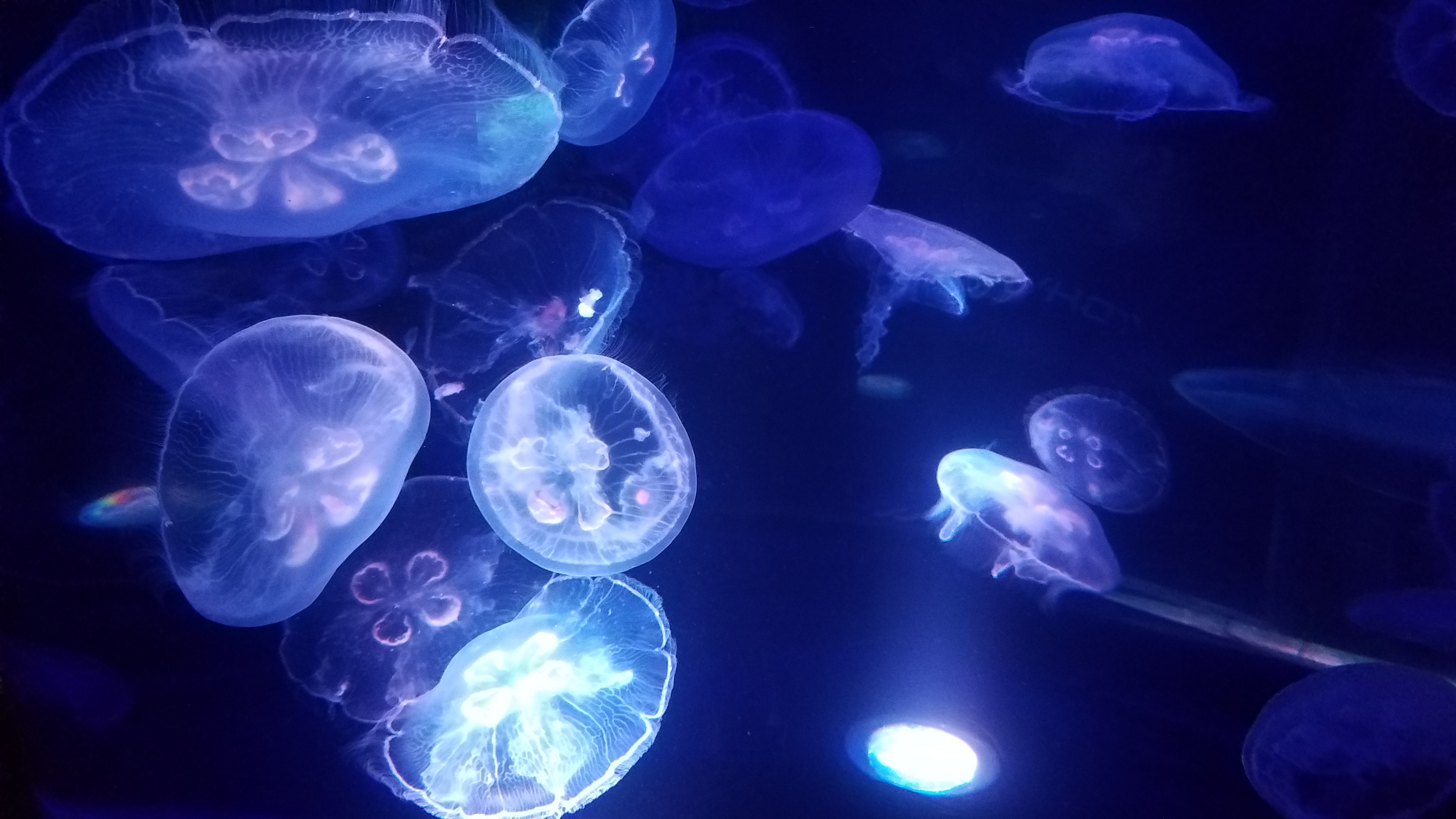
Jellyfish swim in a tank at Waikīkī Aquarium

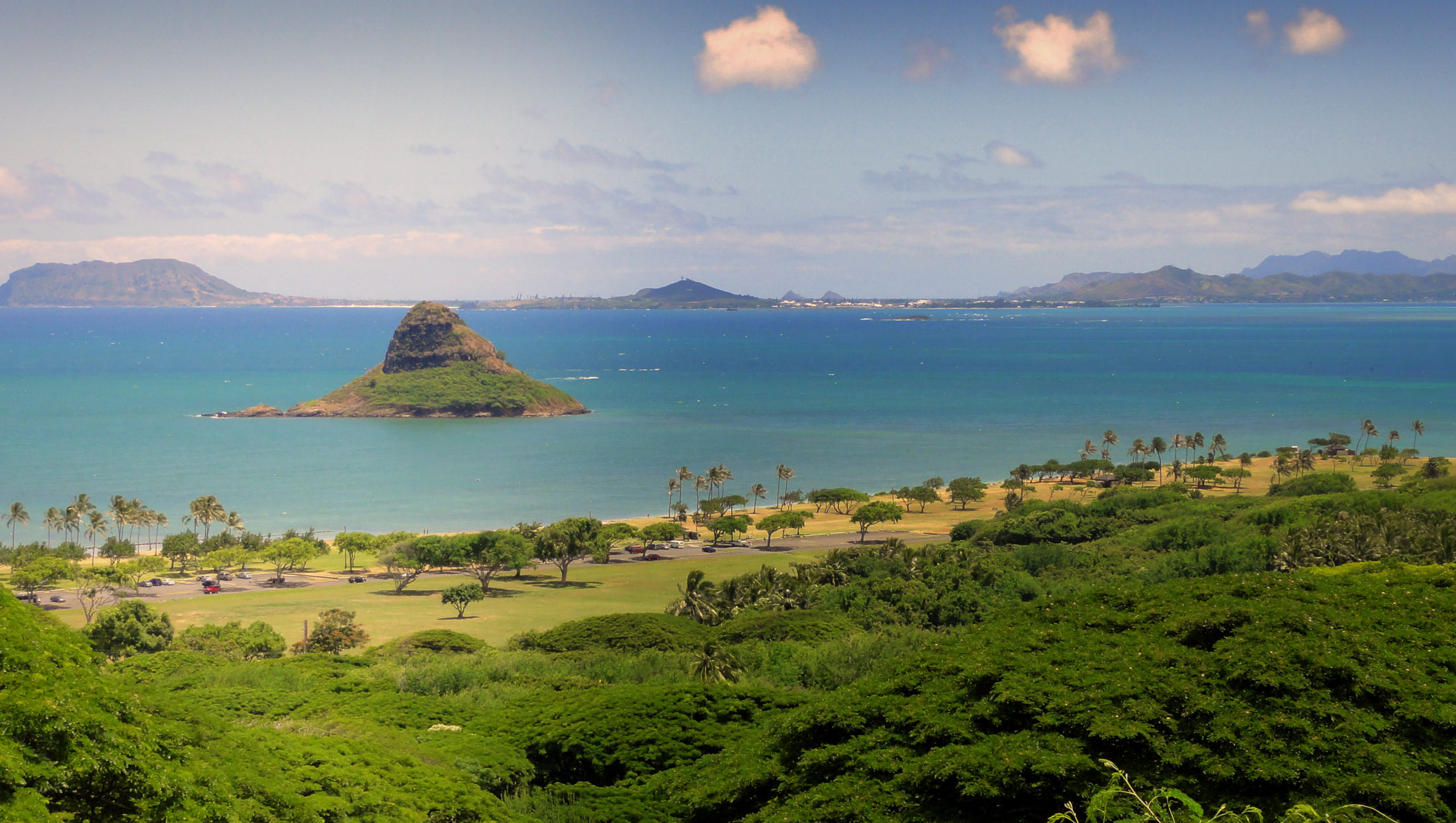
Mokoliʻi island, also known as Chinaman's Hat, offshore of Kualoa Valley

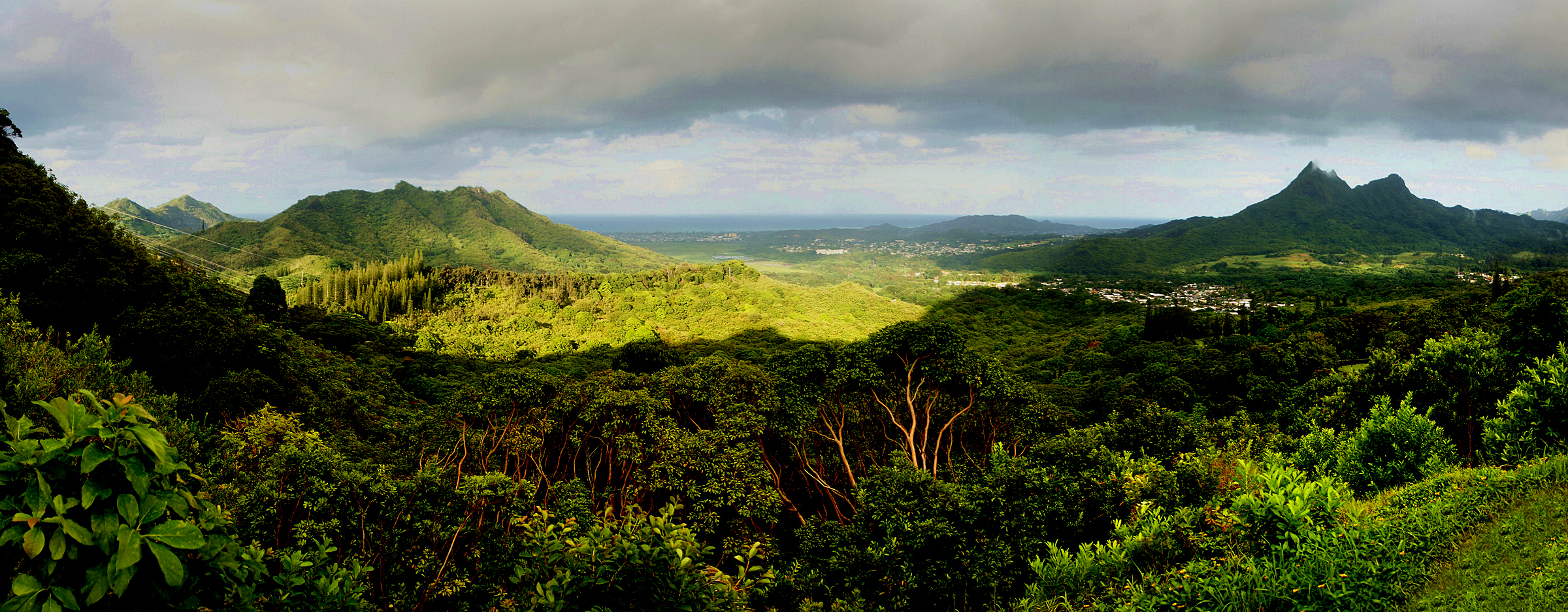
Nuʻuanu Pali of the Koʻolau mountain

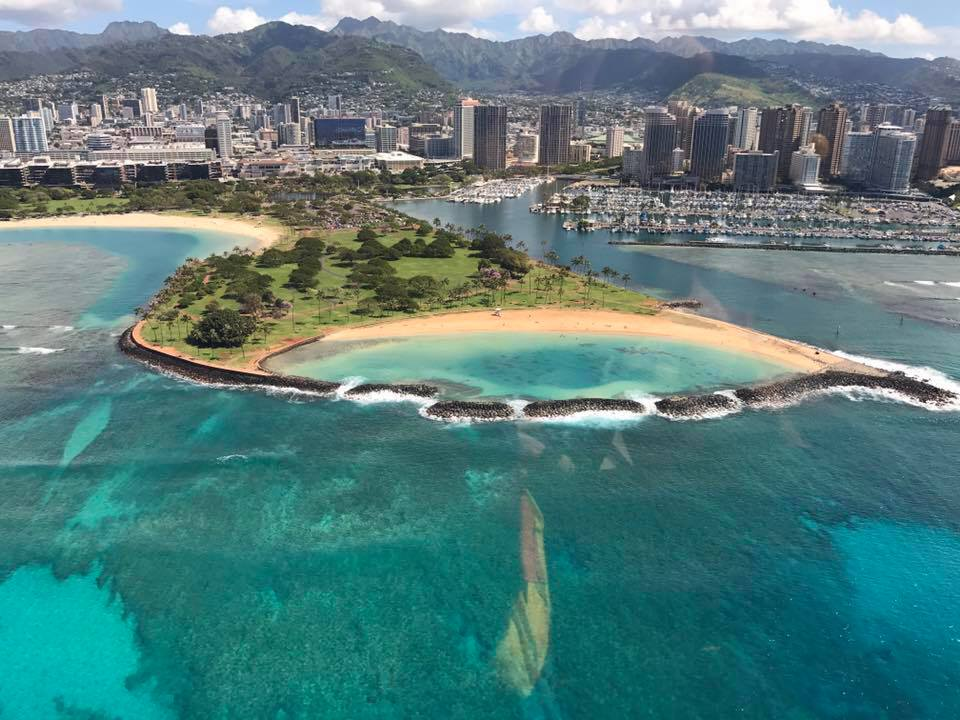
Helicopter view of Magic Island

== Notable people ==
- Benny Agbayani, professional baseball player
- Keiko Agena, actress
- Gabe Baltazar, clarinet and saxophone player
- Alexandria Boehm, scientist
- Darin Brooks, actor, writer, producer
- Angelique Cabral, actress
- Charles Rodman Campbell, serial killer hanged by Washington State in 1994
- Tia Carrere, actress
- Brian Ching, Major League Soccer
- Dennis Chun, actor (Hawaii Five-0), son of Kam Fong Chun
- Bryan Clay, Olympic decathlete 2008
- Sasha Colby, drag performer
- Scott Crary, film director and producer
- Auliʻi Cravalho, actress, singer
- Mark Dacascos, actor
- Caitlin Doughty, mortician, author and YouTuber
- Diana Ewing, actress
- Sid Fernandez, baseball
- Maile Flanagan, actress
- Kam Fong Chun, actor
- Lauren Graham, actress
- Erin Gray, actress
- Brian Grazer, Oscar-winning film and television producer
- Max Holloway, MMA Fighter, Former UFC Featherweight Champion
- Coco Ho, pro surfer
- Don Ho, singer
- Kelly Ann Hu, actress
- Carrie Ann Inaba, dancer, actress, musician
- Daniel Inouye, United States Senator, Medal of Honor recipient
- Jack Johnson, musician, folk-rock singer-songwriter
- Duke Kahanamoku, pro swimmer, surfer, sheriff
- Samuel Kamakau, historian
- Israel Kamakawiwoʻole, musician
- Maxim Knight, actor
- Olin Kreutz, football player Chicago Bears
- Clyde Kusatsu, actor
- Brook Lee, model and co-host of television talk show It's a Hawaii Thing on OC 16
- Teri Ann Linn, actress
- Jack Lord, actor
- Marcus Mariota, NFL football player, Washington Commanders
- Markiplier (Mark Edward Fischbach), Internet personality, video game commentator
- Bruno Mars, actor, singer-songwriter, record producer, musician
- Julie McCullough, actress
- James Mercer, singer-songwriter and frontman of indie rock band The Shins
- Zack Merrick, drummer in American rock band All Time Low
- Bette Midler, singer, actress, comedienne
- Jason Momoa, actor
- Carissa Moore, pro surfer, Olympian
- Tahj Mowry, actor
- Don Muraco, professional wrestler
- Jamie O'Brien, surfer
- Barack Obama, 44th President of the United States
- Ellison Onizuka, NASA astronaut, STS-51-C, STS-51-L, Space Shuttle Challenger disaster
- Noelani Pantastico, ballet dancer
- Janel Parrish, actress, singer
- Kelly Preston, actress
- Maggie Q, actress
- Jonah Ray, actor, comedian, writer
- Makua Rothman (born 1984), world champion surfer
- Anthony Ruivivar, actor
- Jesse Sapolu, retired football player, San Francisco 49ers
- Garret T. Sato, actor
- Amanda Schull, actress
- John John Florence, professional surfer
- Tom Selleck, actor
- James Shigeta, actor
- Jake Shimabukuro, ʻukulele player
- Karen Steele, actress
- Don Stroud, actor
- Tua Tagovailoa, NFL football player, Miami Dolphins
- Ronald Takaki, academic, historian, ethnographer, and author
- Akebono Tarō, sumo wrestler
- Kristi Tauti, professional figure competitor and fitness model
- Manti Teʻo, NFL football player, Los Angeles Chargers
- Paul Theroux, author
- Michelle Wie West, golf LPGA
- Taylor Wily, actor
- Kirby Wright, poet and writer
- Nicole Kidman, actress
- Keone Young, actor

== See also ==
- Honolulu Volcanics
- National Register of Historic Places listings in Oʻahu
- Oahu Ice and Cold Storage Company
