= List of construction companies in the United States =

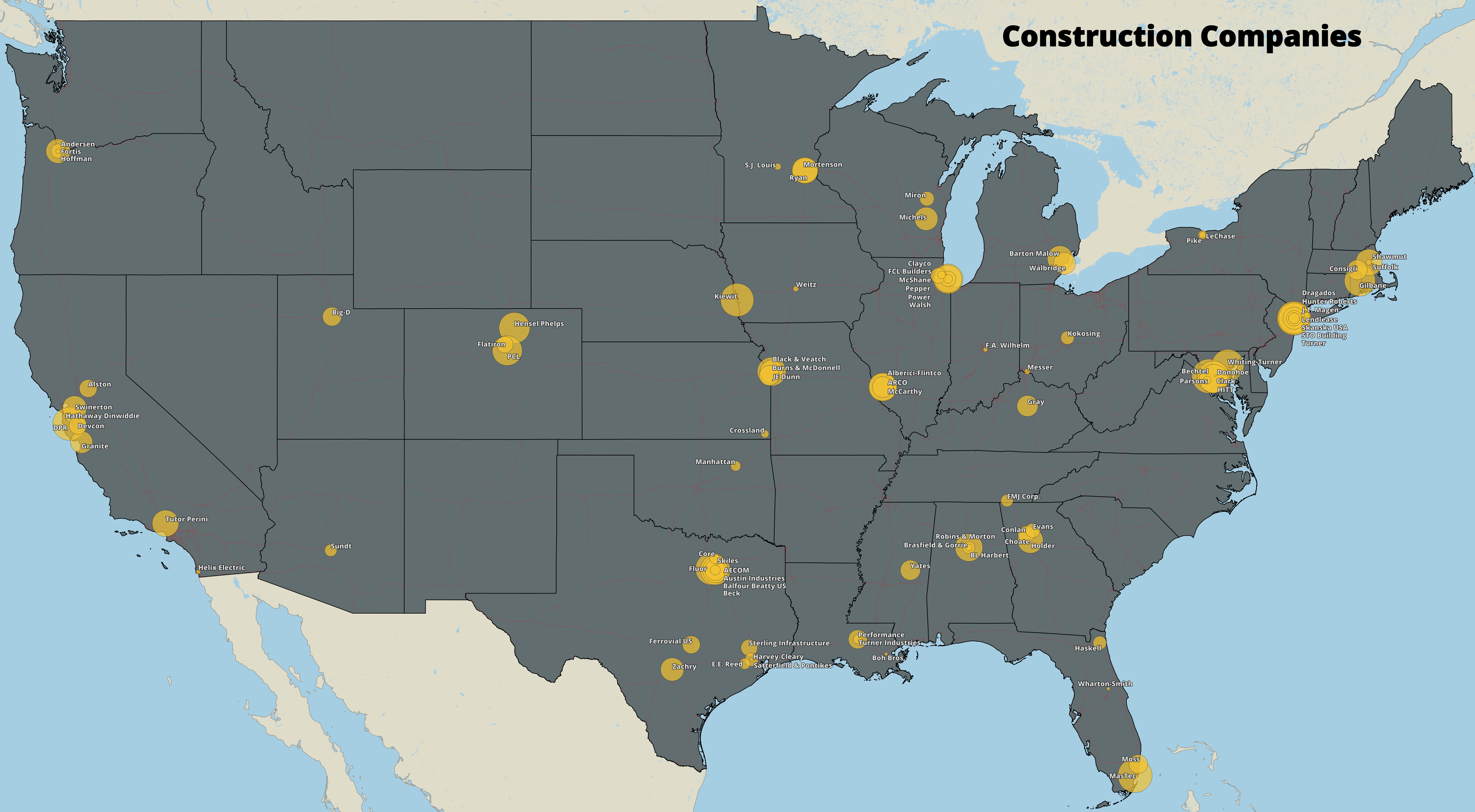
Largest construction companies in the United States, headquarters locations.

This is a list of construction companies in the United States, organized by the state in which each company is headquartered.

== Alabama ==
- B.L. Harbert International
- Brasfield & Gorrie
- Hoar Construction
- The Stewart/Perry Company

== Alaska ==
- Bristol Alliance of Companies

== Arizona ==
- Cavco Industries
- Meritage Homes Corporation
- Taylor Morrison
- Tri Pointe Homes

== Arkansas ==
- Nabholz Construction

== California ==
- DPR Construction
- Granite Construction
- KB Home
- Shea Homes
- Stacy Witbeck
- Swinerton
- Tutor Perini
- Webcor Builders

== Colorado ==
- Century Communities
- Hensel Phelps Construction
- MDC Holdings
- Shannon & Wilson
- Tumbleweed Tiny House Company

== Connecticut ==
- Emcor
- Hoffmann Architects
- Tilcon Connecticut
- Tomasso Group

== Florida ==
- AR Homes
- Haskell
- ICI Homes
- Lennar
- MasTec
- Moss & Associates
- Neal Communities
- Stellar

== Georgia ==
- Beazer Homes USA
- Cumming Corporation
- Flatiron Dragados
- PulteGroup

== Iowa ==
- Stanley Consultants

== Illinois ==
- Bulley & Andrews
- Collins Engineers
- James McHugh Construction Co
- STV Inc.
- Willdan Group

== Kansas ==
- Black & Veatch

== Kentucky ==
- Fischer Homes
- Gray Construction

== Maryland ==
- The Whiting-Turner Contracting Company

== Massachusetts ==
- CDM Smith
- J. F. White Contracting Co.
- Simpson Gumpertz & Heger
- Suffolk Construction Company
- Vanasse Hangen Brustlin, Inc.

== Michigan ==
- Champion Homes
- SmithGroup
- Sorensen Gross Construction Company

== Minnesota ==
- M.A. Mortenson Company
- Ryan Companies

== Missouri ==
- Burns & McDonnell
- HNTB
- J. E. Dunn Construction Group
- STV Group

== Nebraska ==
- HDR, Inc.
- Kiewit Corporation

== New Jersey ==
- Hovnanian Enterprises
- Weeks Marine

== New York ==
- DeSimone Consulting Engineers
- H2M Architects & Engineers
- Hardesty & Hanover
- McKissack & McKissack
- Skanska USA
- Thornton Tomasetti
- Tishman
- Turner Construction
- WSP USA

== North Carolina ==
- Crowder Construction Company
- Deltec Homes
- Kimley-Horn
- WithersRavenel

== Ohio ==
- Schumacher Homes
- SMBH, Inc.

== Oklahoma ==
- Flintco
- Manhattan Construction Company

== Oregon ==
- Hoffman Construction Company

== Pennsylvania ==
- Hill International
- McCormick Taylor
- O'Donnell and Naccarato
- Superior Walls of America
- Toll Brothers
- WPCS International

== Rhode Island ==
- Gilbane, Inc.

== Tennessee ==
- Clayton Homes

== Texas ==
- AECOM
- Balfour Beatty US
- Beck Group
- Byrne Construction Services
- CAT
- Comfort Systems USA
- D. R. Horton
- Fluor Corporation
- Jacobs Solutions
- KBR, Inc.
- Legacy Housing
- LGI Homes
- McDermott International
- Primoris Services Corporation
- Quanta Services
- TDIndustries
- Tellepsen Builders

== Utah ==
- WW Clyde

== Virginia ==
- Bechtel
- Clark Construction
- NVR, Inc.
- Parsons Corporation
- Versar
- VSE Corporation

== Washington ==
- Magnusson Klemencic Associates
- Sellen Construction

== Wisconsin ==
- Michels Corporation
- Miron Construction
- Spancrete
- Wausau Homes
- Wick Buildings

== See also ==
- Construction industry in the United States
- List of civil engineering journals
- List of civil engineering software
- List of BIM software
- List of construction occupations
- List of construction trades
- List of heavy equipment
- List of tools and equipment
