= SMBH =

SMBH may refer to:

- Supermassive black hole
- SMBH, Inc., structural engineers
