= Champion Homes =

Mobile and modular home manufacturing company

Champion Homes, Inc.
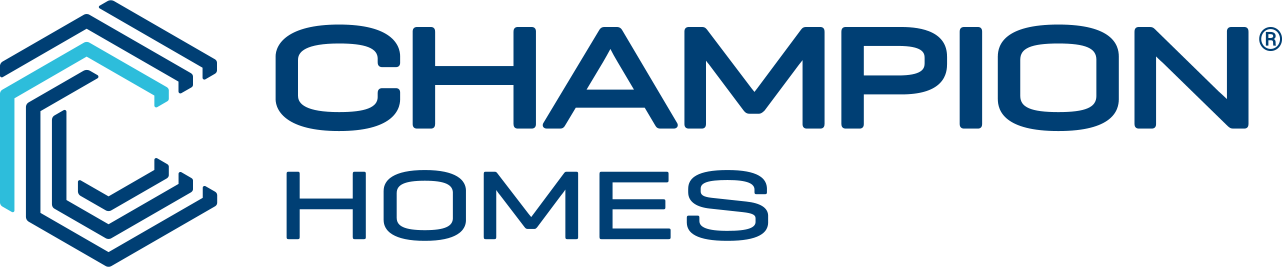
- Type: Public
- Traded as: Nasdaq: SKY; S&P 600 component
- Industry: Manufactured and modular home building
- Founded: 1953; 73 years ago in Dryden, Michigan
- Founders: Walter W. Clark; Henry E. George
- Headquarters: Troy, Michigan
- Key people: Tim Larson, President & CEO
- Number of employees: 8,000+
- Website: championhomes.com

Champion Homes, Inc., is a mobile and modular home manufacturing company. It is one of the largest modular homebuilders in North America. The company also provides factory-built housing to the United States and western Canada.

== Products ==
Champion Homes is primarily a manufacturer of mobile and modular homes, but they have also built travel trailers, RVs, campers, and commercial buses. Furthermore, Champion Homes has built modular homes for government applications. Champion Homes has acquired many brand names, including Caledonian Building Systems, Carolina Building Solutions, Commander, Dutch, Fortune, Highland Manufacturing, Homes of Merit, Moduline, New Era, New Image, North American, Redman, Silvercrest, SRI, Summit Crest and Titan.

As of 2025 Champion Homes had sold over 3,000,000 of factory-built homes, modular and park model homes.

== History ==
Champion Homes was founded in 1953 as a single manufacturing facility in the small town of Dryden in rural Michigan by Walter W. Clark and Henry E. George.

- In 2005, Champion was the first manufacturer to build privatized modular housing for the military.
- In 2010, Champion filed for bankruptcy and was acquired by an investor group led by Centerbridge Partners, MAK Capital Fund LP and Sankaty Advisors and company lenders led by Credit Suisse. The company later recovered.

== Today ==
Champion Homes is still headquartered in Michigan, but in Troy, Michigan rather than Dryden, and has over 40 manufacturing facilities located across the United States and Canada. Worldwide, Champion Homes employs over 8,000 people.

In June 2018 Champion Enterprises Holdings LLC combined with Skyline Corporation to form the Skyline Champion Corporation.

From August 2024, Skyline Champion Corporation changed their corporate name to Champion Homes, Inc.

== See also ==
- Mobile Home
- Cavco Industries
- Clayton Homes
- Toll Brothers
- D. R. Horton
