= Steven A. Cohen (academic) =

American academic

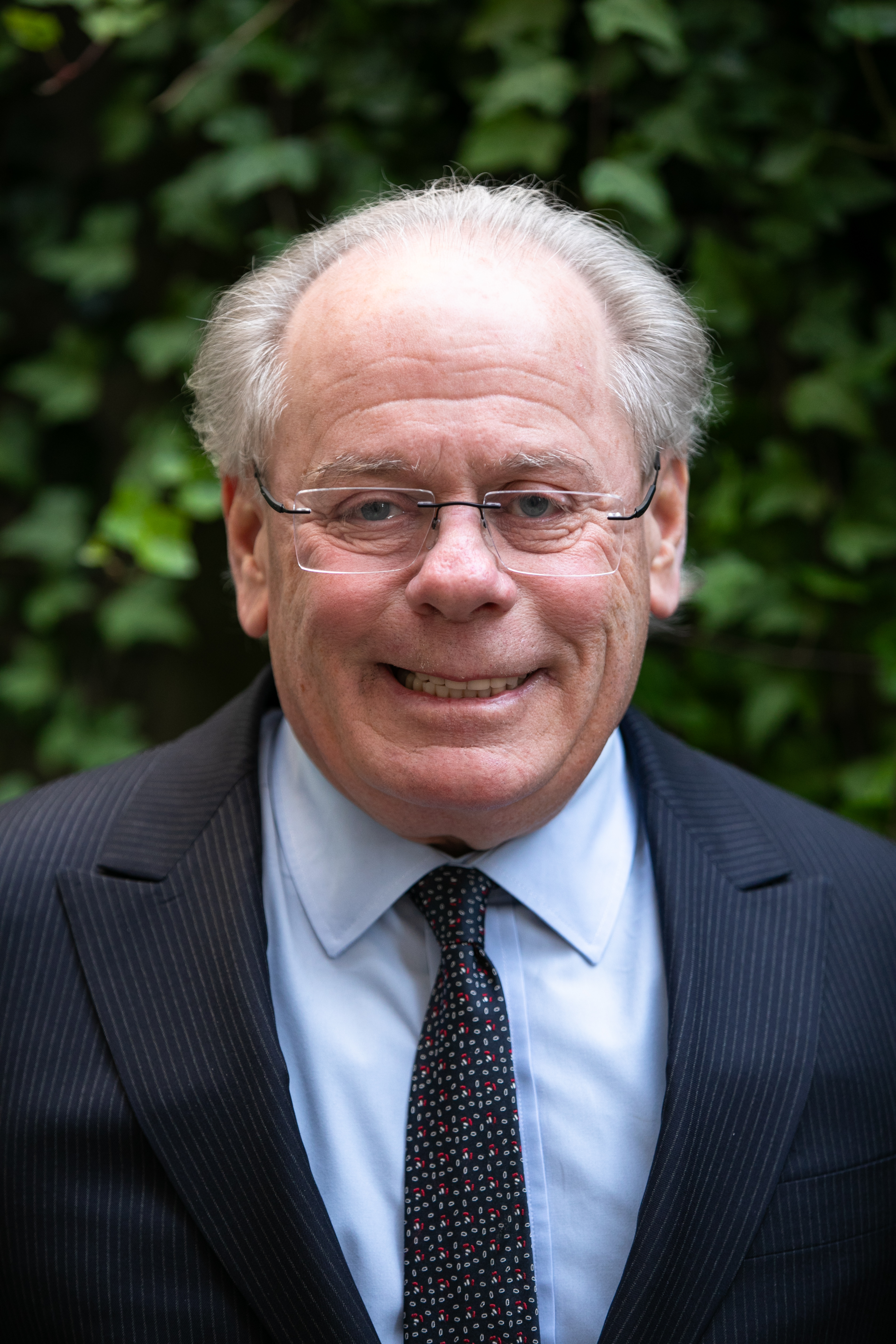
- Born: 1953 (age 72–73); Orange, New Jersey, U.S.
- Occupations: Former Executive Director, The Earth Institute at Columbia University
- Spouse(s): Donna Fishman, 2 children

Steven A. Cohen (born 1953) is an American academic who has taught public management and environmental policy at Columbia University since 1981. He is the former executive director of Columbia University's Earth Institute. He is a professor in the practice of public affairs at Columbia University's School of International and Public Affairs. He is also the director of the Master of Public Administration in Environmental Science and Policy in the School of International and Public Affairs and the director of the Master of Science in Sustainability Management in the School of Professional Studies. He served on the Environmental Protection Agency Administrator's National Advisory Council for Environmental Policy and Technology (2002–2004). He currently serves on the board of directors of Homes for the Homeless, the admissions committee of the Lotos Club, and as the lead independent director of the board of directors of the Willdan Group, Inc. Cohen formerly served on the faculty advisory committee for the Porter School of Environmental Studies at Tel Aviv University. Cohen also sat on the judging committee for the Yidan Prize Foundation. He served on the advisory board of the University of Minnesota's Institute on the Environment (2016-2022).

== Biography ==
Cohen is the senior vice dean of Columbia's School of Professional Studies and a professor in the practice of public affairs at Columbia University's School of International and Public Affairs. He is also director of the Master of Public Administration Program in Environmental Science and Policy at Columbia University's School of International and Public Affairs, director of the Masters of Science in Sustainability Management at Columbia University's School of Professional Studies, and the director of the Earth Institute's Research Program on Sustainability Policy and Management at Columbia University.

Cohen graduated from James Madison High School in Brooklyn, New York, in 1970 and then attended Franklin College, in Franklin, Indiana, where he received his B.A. in political science in 1974. He received his M.A. and Ph.D. from University at Buffalo, The State University of New York in political science, with a concentration in environmental policy and public policy. From 1976 to 1977, Cohen was a Ford Foundation Fellow in Urban Environmental Policy, and from 1978 to 1979, he was a Rockefeller Foundation Fellow in Public and Environmental Policy and Implementation.

Cohen served as a policy analyst in the EPA from 1977 to 1978 in the Office of Water and then in 1980–1981 in the Office of Hazardous Emergency Response and was responsible for developing and coordinating the implementation of public participation policy for the agency's hazardous waste clean-up Superfund Program. He worked as a consultant to the agency from 1981 to 1991, 1994–1996, and 2005–2010.

In 1981 he began working at Columbia University's School of International and Public Affairs as an assistant professor of political science and became the director of the Graduate Program in Public Policy and Administration in 1985. From 1985 to 1998, he was the director of Columbia's Graduate Program in Public Policy and Administration, and from 1998 to 2001 Cohen worked as the vice dean of Columbia University's School of International and Public Affairs. In addition, Cohen was the associate dean for faculty and curriculum at SIPA from 1987 to 1998. From 2002 to 2006, he directed education programs at The Earth Institute, and became executive director in 2006.

Cohen has acted as a consultant to the EPA's Superfund program, underground storage tank program and Region II management. Along with William Eimicke he has undertaken management consulting and training for a number of government and nonprofit organizations.

Cohen often comments on regional and national environmental policies, from Mayor Bloomberg’s PlaNYC to waste-to-energy options for urban areas, from the aftermath of 9/11 to global warming and nuclear energy. He is frequently mentioned in publications such as the Daily News, The New York Times, USA Today, and Financial Times on regional politics. Cohen has commented multiple times for both Fox News and NY1 television on the New York City mayoral race and the presidential campaigns.

Cohen is the author of The Sustainable City (2017, 2020), Understanding Environmental Policy (2006, 2014), Sustainability Management (2011), The Effective Public Manager (1988, now co-authored in its fifth edition), and the co-author of Management Fundamentals (2020), Sustainability Policy: Hastening the Transition to a Cleaner Economy (2015), The Responsible Contact Manager (2008), Strategic Planning in Environmental Regulation (2005), Tools for Innovators: Creative Strategies for Managing Public Sector Organizations (1998), and Total Quality Management in Government (1993). He has written numerous articles on public management, sustainability management, and environmental policy. Cohen also is a weekly contributor to The State of the Planet.

Cohen maintains a personal blog that includes an in-depth biography, listing of his publications and presentations, and more.

== Selected publications ==
Books

- Environmentally Sustainable Growth: A Pragmatic Approach (Columbia University Press, May 2023)
- Sustainability Policy: Hastening the Transition to a Cleaner Economy (with William Eimicke and Alison Miller), (Jossey-Bass Publishers, 2015)
- Understanding Environmental Policy, 2nd Edition (Columbia University Press, 2014)
- Sustainability Management: Lessons from and for New York City, America, and the Planet (Columbia University Press, 2011)
- Understanding Environmental Policy (Columbia University Press, 2006)
- Strategic Planning in Environmental Regulation: A Policy Approach That Works (With Sheldon Kamieniecki and Matthew A. Cahn), (MIT Press, 2005)
- The Effective Public Manager, 5th Edition (With William Eimicke and Tanya Heikkila), (Jossey-Bass Publishers, 2013)
- Tools for Innovators (With William Eimicke), (Jossey-Bass Publishers, 1998)
- Total Quality Management in Government (With Ronald Brand) (1993)

Articles

- "COVID-19 in New York City as an Extreme Event: The Disruption and Resumption of the Global City" [1]
- "Understanding the Sustainable Lifestyle" [2]
- “All Environmental Politics is Local” [3]
- "A positive vision of sustainability" (with Kelsie DeFrancia and Hayley Martinez) [4]
- “What Is Stopping the Renewable Energy Transformation and What Can the U.S. Government Do?” [5]
- “The Irrelevance of Global Climate Talks” [6]
- "Life Cycle Assessment and the U.S. Policy-Making Context" [7]
- “Sustainability and Management Competence” [8]
- "The Use of Strategic Planning, Information, and Analysis in Environmental Policy-Making and Management" [9]
- "Climate change 2011: A status report on US policy" (with Alison Miller) [10]
- "Sustainable New York City: A Work in Progress" [11]
- "Public Participation and Shaping Urban Development: The Case of the Atlantic Yard and Nets Arena Project in Brooklyn" (with William Eimicke) [12]
- "Environmental Policy at its Most Fundamental: The Case of New York City's Solid Waste Crisis" [13]
- "Managing Privatization: The Tools, Skills, Goals and Ethics of Contracting" (with William Eimicke) [14]
- "Managing Workfare:The Case of the Work Experience Program in the New York City Parks Department" [15]
- "Trump Wants to Unleash Energy, as Long as It’s Not Wind or Solar" [16]
- "A New Technology For Getting Rid Of ‘Forever Chemicals’" [17]
- "Renew Support for Renewable Energy" [18]
- "As New York Retreats from Charging Drivers More, These Cities are Pushing Ahead" [19]
- "Objections hamper plans for Tri-Cities wind farm, other renewable energy projects in Washington state" [20]
