= Cavco Industries =

Mobile and modular home manufacturing company

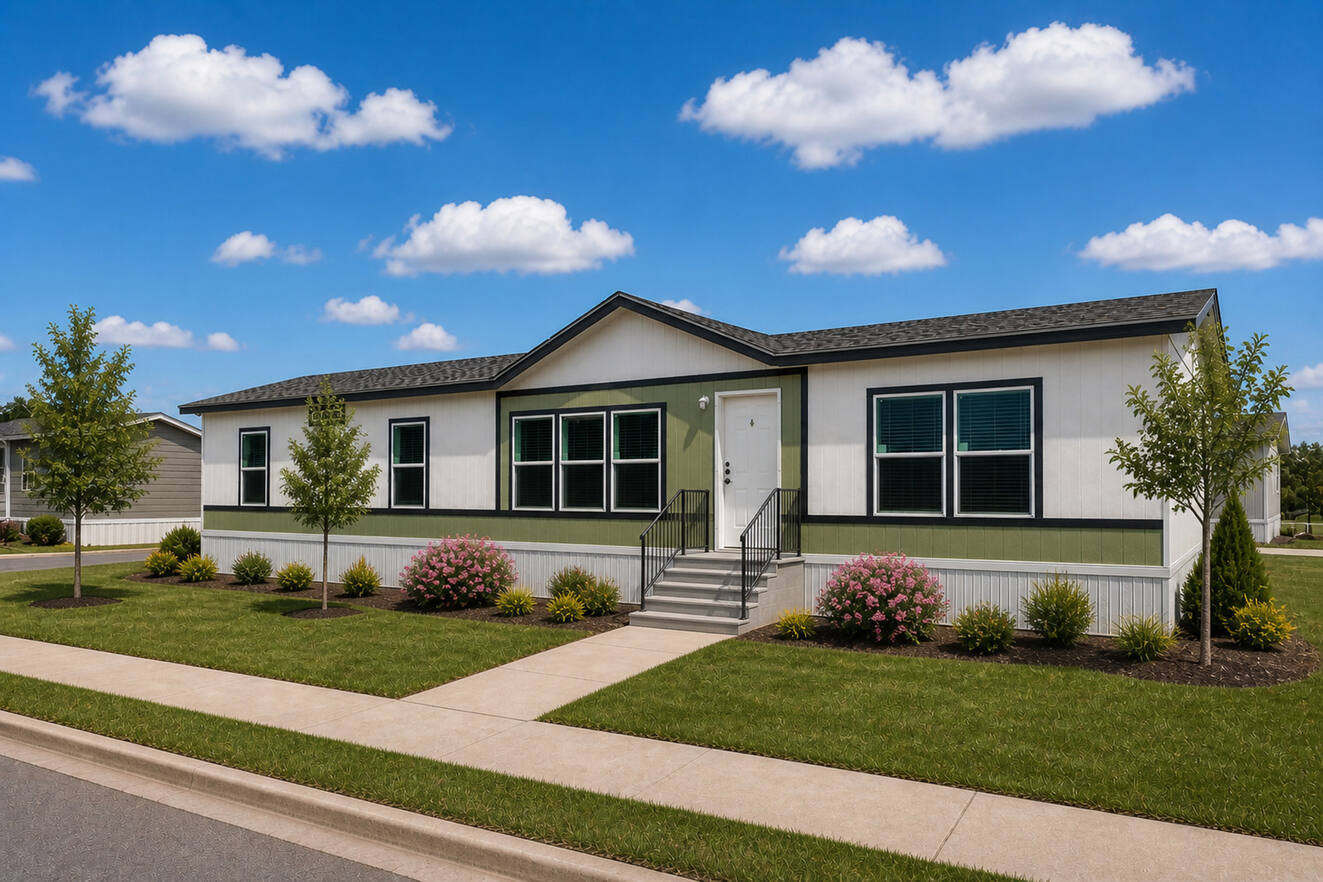
- A Cavco Manufactured Home
- Type: Public
- Traded as: Nasdaq: CVCO
- Industry: Housing
- Founded: 1965
- Headquarters: Phoenix, Arizona, U.S.
- Key people: William C. Boor (President and CEO)
- Products: Manufactured homes, modular homes, park model RVs, vacation cabins, commercial structures
- Number of employees: approx. 8,000 (2026)
- Website: www.cavcohomes.com

Cavco Industries, Inc. (Nasdaq: CVCO) is an American manufacturer of factory-built housing, including manufactured homes, modular homes, park model RVs, vacation cabins and commercial structures. Cavco is headquartered in Phoenix, Arizona. The company offers financing and insurance services for its products.

Cavco operates manufacturing facilities across the United States and Mexico and distributes homes through independent retailers, company-owned stores and developers. As of 2026, the company employed approximately 8,000 people. The company grew through acquisitions while unifying its operations under one national brand in 2025.

== History ==
=== Origins and early history (1965–1995) ===
Cavco Industries originated in 1965 when Al Ghelfi founded the unincorporated association Roadrunner Manufacturing Company (renamed to Cavalier Company in 1966) in Phoenix, Arizona. The company initially manufactured truck campers. The company shifted strategy after the 1973 oil crisis, as rising fuel costs hurt the RV and truck camper markets. Ghelfi bought out his business partner and transitioned the operation entirely to factory-built housing. Original product lines were discontinued, and the firm officially rebranded as Cavco Industries in 1974. The company expanded operations, selling units through specialized dealerships across Arizona. Throughout the late 1970s and 1980s, Cavco expanded into regional markets, diversifying its product lineup in 1986 by manufacturing and leasing relocatable commercial structures.

=== Centex ownership and independent spinoff (1996–2008) ===
In December 1996, the national homebuilding corporation Centex entered the manufactured housing sector by merging with Cavco Industries. Under Centex's ownership, Cavco integrated retail distribution, acquiring AAA Homes in 1998 to enter the direct-to-consumer sales field.

By the early 2000s, deterioration in the broader United States manufactured housing industry led to widespread industry contraction and consecutive operating losses. In response, Centex shifted its focus back to traditional site-built homes. On June 30, 2003, Centex spun off Cavco as an independent, publicly traded corporation, listing it on the NASDAQ exchange under the ticker symbol CVCO.

=== Mergers, acquisitions and brand consolidation (2009–present) ===
The company expanded through acquisitions of other building companies, including Fleetwood Enterprises (2009) and Palm Harbor Homes (2011). The company later added Commodore Corporation (2021), Solitaire Homes (2023) and American Homestar Corporation (Oak Creek Homes, 2025). These acquisitions increased production capacity, retail presence and geographic reach, particularly in the South Central and Northeastern U.S. regions.

In 2025, coinciding with its 60th anniversary, Cavco unified its legacy manufacturing brands under the single "Cavco" name (announced March 2025, effective April). More than 30 different manufacturers came under the Cavco brand. Plants now operate as "Cavco-[City]" (e.g., Cavco-Seguin, Cavco-Rocky Mount), with homes marketed by product lines.

== Operations ==
Cavco designs and builds factory-built homes in a climate-controlled environment. Its products include customizable manufactured and modular homes designed for residential, commercial and other applications. Homes are distributed nationwide (and parts of Canada) via company-owned retail locations and independent retailers, planned communities and developers.

In December 2023, Cavco launched The Anthem, the first nationally available, HUD-approved duplex series. As of 2026, there were 4 models in the Anthem series and the duplexes can be placed on a single home lot, thus doubling housing availability. In September 2026, Cavco introduced the first HUD Code chassis-free manufactured home, the Grande Arbor, in Washington D.C. at the 2026 Innovative Housing Showcase, an annual HUD-organized event that highlights innovative housing design and technologies.

The company operates two reportable segments:

- Factory-Built Housing (core): Manufacturing and retail sales.
- Financial Services: Consumer financing (via CountryPlace Mortgage and American Homestar Mortgage) and property/casualty insurance (via Standard Casualty Company, Cedarbrook Insurance Group).

== Leadership ==
William C. Boor is President and CEO (since 2019). During Boor's tenure, the company has expanded through acquisitions and increased its focus on factory-built housing.

== Acquisitions ==
Cavco expanded through acquisitions beginning in 2009 with the purchase of Fleetwood Homes. The company later acquired Palm Harbor Homes in 2011; Fairmont Homes, Friendship Homes and Chariot Eagle in 2015; Lexington Homes in 2017; Destiny Homes in 2019; Commodore Corporation in 2021; Solitaire Homes in 2023 and American Homestar Corporation in 2025.

| Year | Acquisition |
|---|---|
| 2009 | Fleetwood Homes |
| 2011 | Palm Harbor Homes |
| 2015 | Fairmont Homes |
| 2015 | Friendship Homes |
| 2015 | Chariot Eagle |
| 2017 | Lexington Homes |
| 2019 | Destiny Homes |
| 2021 | Commodore Corporation |
| 2023 | Solitaire Homes |
| 2025 | American Homestar Corporation |

== Homes for Our Own ==
Homes for Our Own is a Cavco Industries employee program that provides financial education on the home-buying process — including budgeting, credit improvement, and ongoing ownership costs — along with financial assistance for qualifying first-time homebuyers. The program is funded primarily through voluntary payroll contributions from employees, which the company matches dollar-for-dollar up to an annual limit of $200,000. Classes are offered in Spanish as well as English.

== Awards and recognition ==
Cavco Industries and its executives have received recognition from manufactured housing industry organizations and trade publications.

- 2022: The Manufactured Housing Institute (MHI) awarded its Community Impact Project of the Year honor to Cavco's Five Points Neighborhood Initiative.
- 2024: Training magazine featured Cavco's Master of Craft employee development program as a Training APEX Awards Best Practice.
- 2026: Cavco received two MHI Excellence in Manufactured Housing design awards – Manufactured Home Design – Single Section for the Serenity Cabana and Modular Housing Design Award for The Luxus.

=== Leadership awards ===
- Bill Boor, President and CEO, received the 2025 MHInsider Advocacy Award for his industry advocacy and outreach efforts.
- Allison K. Aden, Executive Vice President and Chief Financial Officer, received the 2024 Arizona CFO of the Year Award in the Enterprise Business category from the Arizona chapter of Financial Executives International.
  - In 2012, while serving as chief financial officer of Recall Corporation, Aden was also recognized as a Women Worth Watching award recipient.

== See also ==
- Manufactured housing
- Modular building
- Accessory Dwelling Units (ADUs)
- Mobile Home
- Champion Homes
- Clayton Homes
- D.R. Horton
- Lennar
- Toll Brothers
