= Clover Park (Florida) =

Baseball stadium in Port St. Lucie, Florida, US

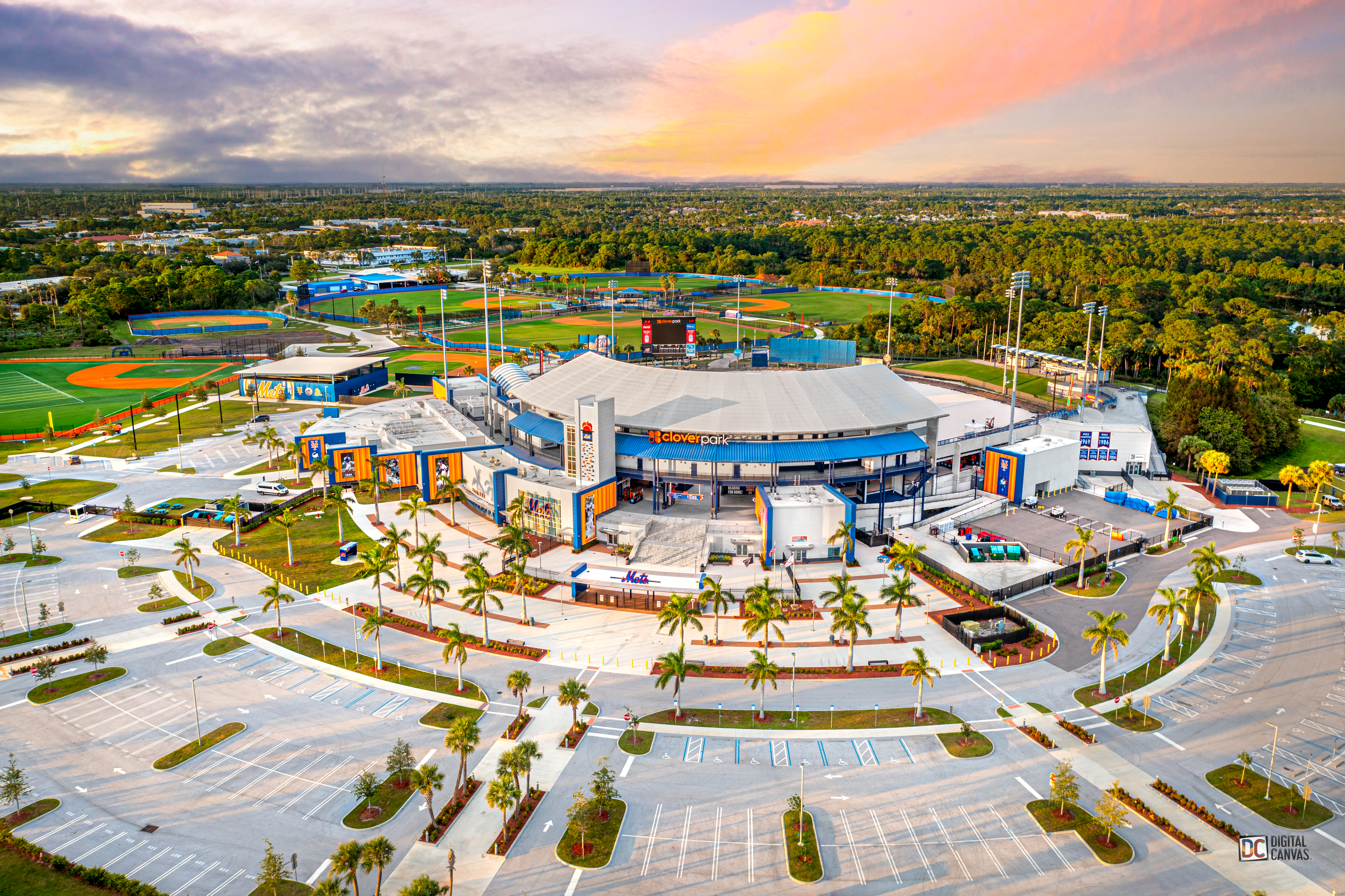
- Interactive map of Clover Park
- Former names: Thomas J. White Stadium (1988–2004); Digital Domain Park (2010–2012); Tradition Field (2004–2009; 2012–2016); First Data Field (2017–2019)
- Address: 31 Piazza Drive; Port St. Lucie, FL 34986
- Coordinates: 27°19′31.01″N 80°24′16.18″W
- Owner: St. Lucie County
- Operator: St. Lucie Parks & Recreation Department
- Capacity: 7,160
- Surface: Grass
- Field size: Left field: 338 feet (103 m); Left-Center field: 371 feet (113 m); Center field: 410 feet (120 m); Right-Center field: 371 feet (113 m); Right field: 338 feet (103 m)

Construction
- Groundbreaking: December 19, 1986
- Built: 1987
- Opened: March 5, 1988
- Renovated: 2019
- Cost: $11 million ($29.9 million in 2025 dollars)
- Architects: Hoon & White
- Structural engineer: Lantz Jones Nebraska, Inc.
- General contractor: Hunzinger Construction

Tenants
- New York Mets (MLB) (spring training); St. Lucie Mets (FSL) 1988–present FCL Mets (FCL) 1992–1999; 2004–2011; 2013–present

Clover Park is a baseball stadium located in Port St. Lucie, Florida. The stadium was built in time for the 1988 season and holds 7,160 people. It is the spring training home of the New York Mets (who moved from St. Petersburg's Al Lang Stadium), as well as the home to the St. Lucie Mets Single-A team and the Florida Complex League Mets Rookie League team. The stadium shares the same field dimensions of the now demolished Shea Stadium. It also sometimes hosts college games.

== Naming rights ==
The stadium was originally named Thomas J. White Stadium. White was a real estate developer from St. Louis, Missouri, who worked with sportswriter Jack Champion on the successful campaign to bring the Mets to Port St. Lucie. This name would continue to be used from 1988 until 2004 when the Mets changed the name of the venue to Tradition Field.

On March 23, 2010, during a Mets spring training game against the Atlanta Braves, it was announced that effective immediately the stadium would be renamed Digital Domain Park as a result of a multi-year partnership between the Mets and Digital Domain.

At the end of the 2012 season, the Mets announced that Digital Domain would no longer own the naming rights to the ballpark and that the stadium would temporarily be renamed Mets Stadium. On February 7, 2013, the Mets struck a new deal with the developers of the nearby master-planned neighborhood Tradition and the ballpark was once again called Tradition Field.

On February 23, 2017, the Mets announced a 10-year strategic partnership with First Data to rename the ballpark First Data Field. First Data's 2019 acquisition by Fiserv led in February 2020 to the ballpark being renamed Clover Park for the company's Clover point-of-sale-platform.

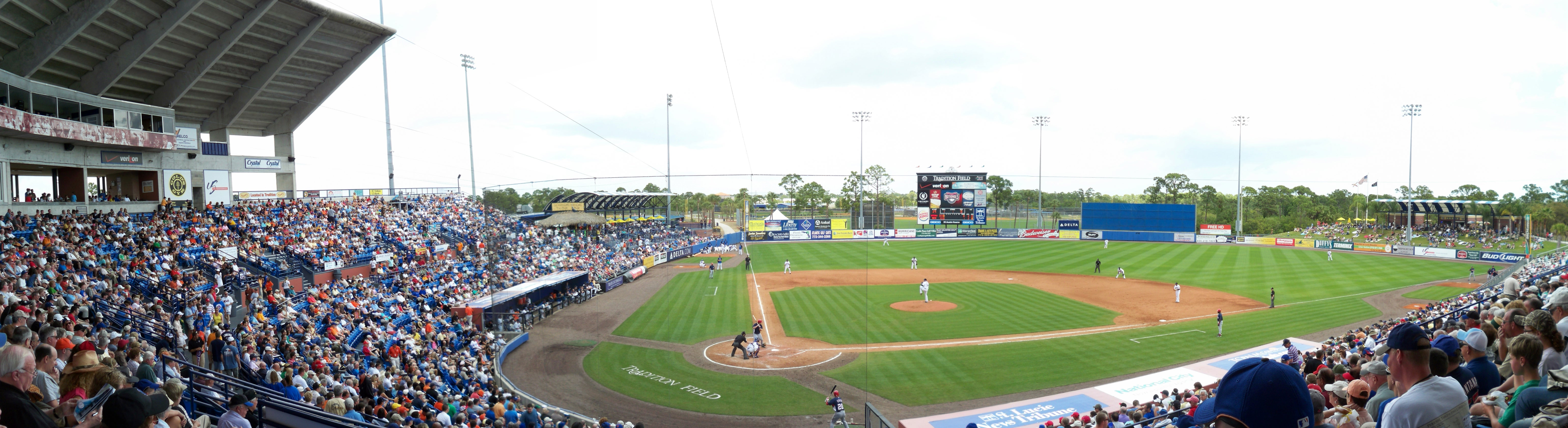
Tradition Field in 2009

== Improvements ==
The Stadium featured several new amenities in 2012. The right field bleacher was replaced with 500 field-level seats, highlighted by an outdoor bar and grill similar to the third base-side Tiki Bar. The right field section was also connected to the outfield grass berm area for easy access throughout the facility. The scoreboard was upgraded to include a larger screen featuring replay highlights in HD.

The stadium was renovated for the 2020 Spring Training season. The improvements included new concessions, clubhouses, and additional outfield areas for spectators. In 2022, the bullpens were moved from on the field to behind the left field fence.

== Florida State League All-Star Games ==
Since opening, Clover Park has hosted the Florida State League All-Star Game a total of three times. The most recent time was in 2015, following the 1994 and 2004 editions of the exhibition game.
