= Construction industry in the United States =

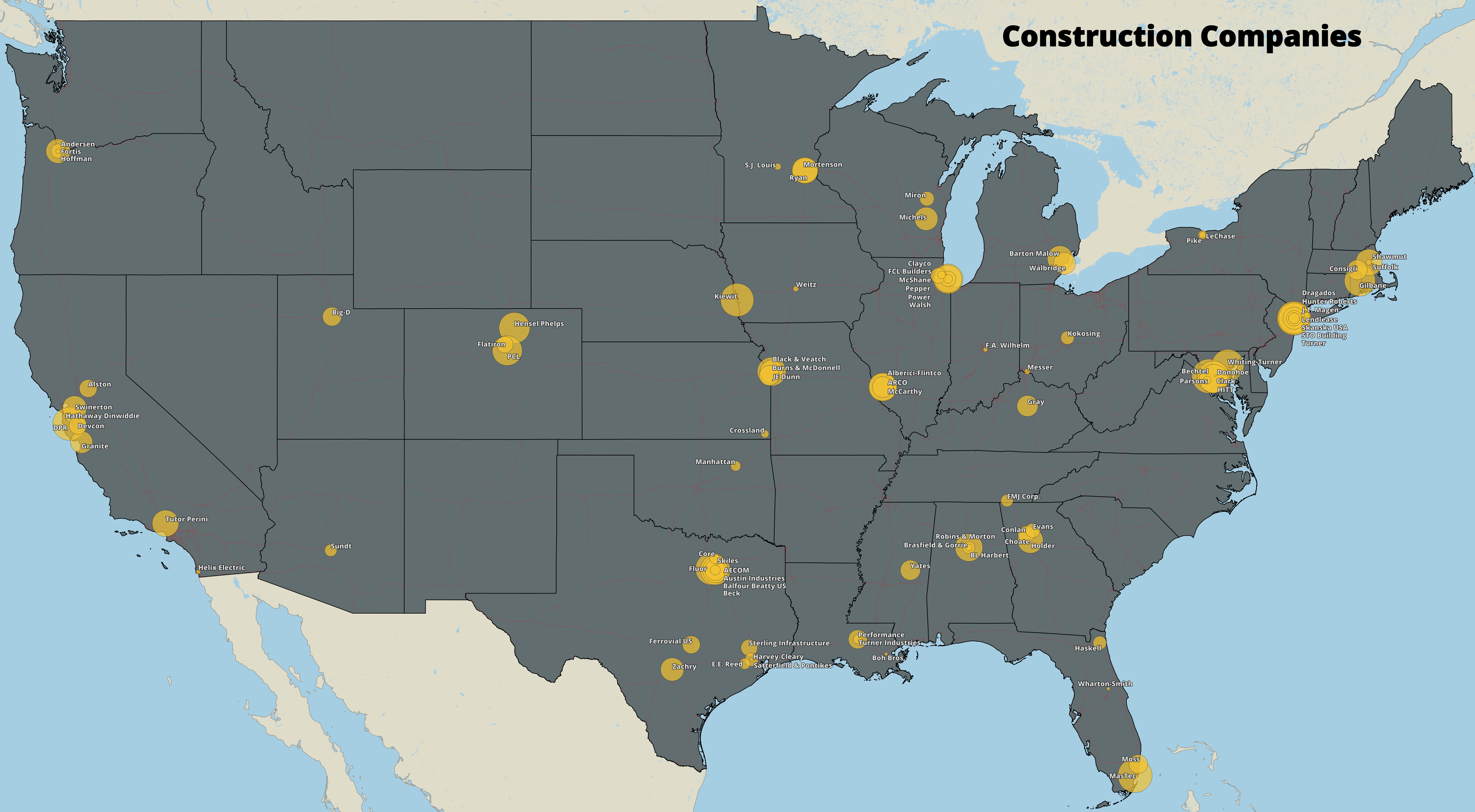
Largest construction companies in the United States, headquarters locations.

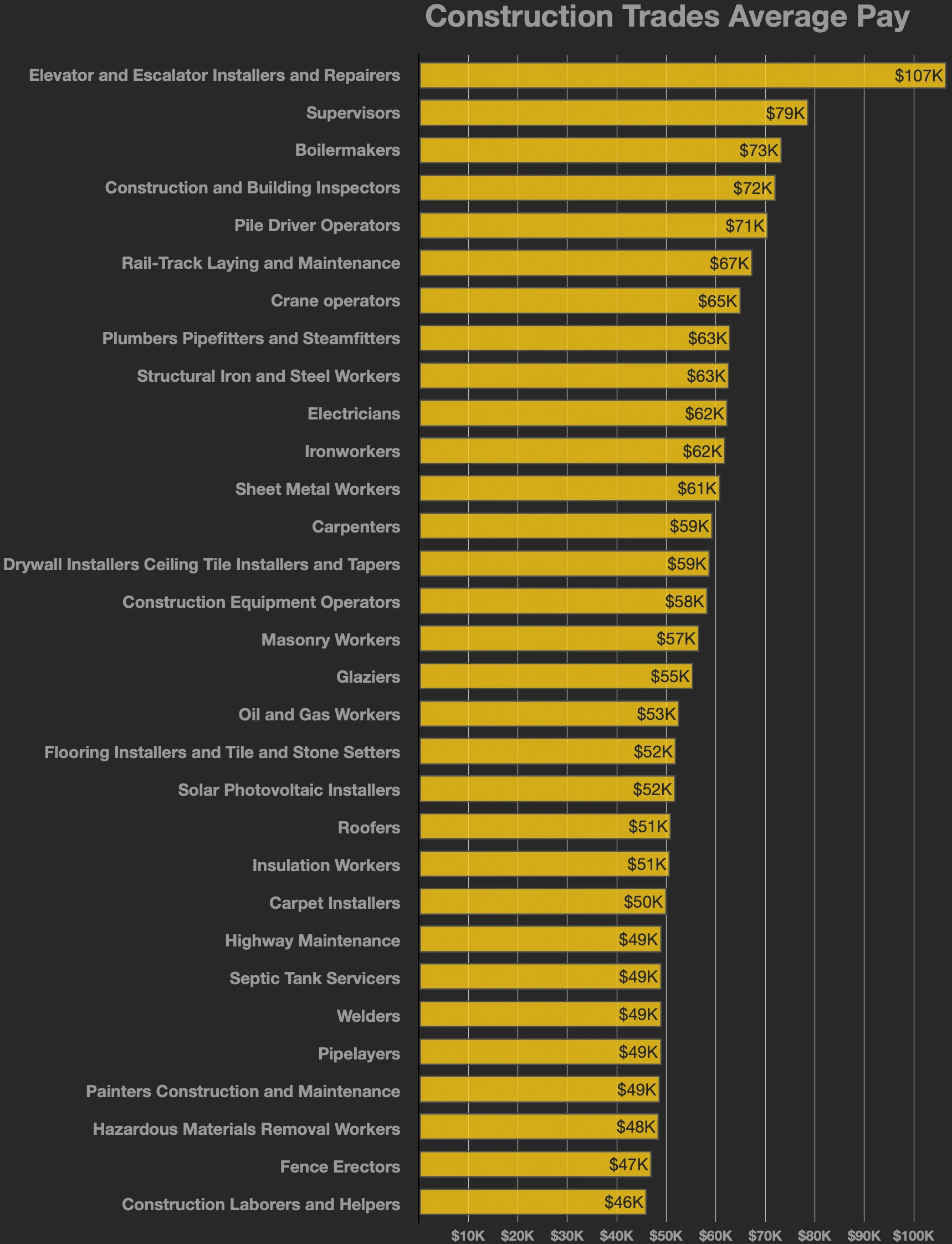
Construction trades average pay

The construction industry in the United States is one of the major sectors of the country's economy. As of November 1, 2022 there are over 745,000 general contractor LLCs employing over 7.6 million in its workforce, putting up almost US$1.4 trillion worth of structures annually.

== Regulation ==
The American construction industry suffers from fragmentation along state lines because of how professional licensing has traditionally been the province of the state governments. Thus, construction professionals based on one state who wish to practice in other states must comply with those states' various licensing, registration, taxation, and incorporation requirements. A 1998 treatise on the law of American construction professional licensing required 1,842 pages split across two volumes to summarize the requirements for fifty states, the District of Columbia, and contractors working for the federal government.

== Workforce ==
In 2023, 23% of the workforce was made up of immigrants, with about 12% of that being unauthorized immigrants.

== See also ==
- Associated General Contractors of America
- Journal of Construction Engineering & Management
- List of construction trades
- List of heavy equipment
- List of building information modeling software
- List of civil engineering software
