= Jim Clayton (businessman) =

American lawyer

- Born: James L. Clayton; March 2, 1934 (age 92); Finger, Tennessee, US
- Education: University of Tennessee
- Known for: Founder of Clayton Homes
- Spouse: Michell Beth Clayton
- Children: 4

James L. Clayton Sr. (born March 2, 1934) is an American businessman, investor, and philanthropist. He founded Clayton Homes in 1966 and built it into the United States' largest producer and seller of manufactured housing, a formerly publicly traded company that was sold to Berkshire Hathaway in 2003 for $1.7 billion.

== Early life ==
James L. Clayton was born in 1934 in Finger, Tennessee. His father was a sharecropper. As a child, he aspired to become a country music singer. After high school, he went to Memphis to attend Memphis State and perform in honky tonks. After becoming ill at the end of the first year, he transferred to the University of Tennessee in Knoxville, where he was a member of the Sigma Phi Epsilon fraternity and received an engineering degree in 1957. He received a J.D. degree from the University of Tennessee College of Law in 1964.

== Career ==
While a student, Clayton started an informal business of fixing and reselling used cars, establishing a used-car business in 1956. That business grew into a group of Knoxville-area automobile dealerships operated by Jim Clayton and his brother Joe; Jim Clayton sold his interest in the automotive business to Joe in 1981.

Clayton branched into the mobile home business in 1966.

Clayton published an autobiography, First a Dream (FSB Press, ISBN 978-0-9726389-0-6), in 2002, cowritten with Bill Retherford. Reportedly, the book motivated Warren Buffett to buy Clayton's company, but a 2004 article in Fast Company magazine suggested that the story was not as simple as was widely reported.

== Philanthropy ==
Clayton has made many charitable contributions in the Knoxville area, including a $3.25 million donation for construction of the Knoxville Museum of Art; a $1 million donation to the University of Tennessee College of Law for its Center for Entrepreneurial Law; and a $1 million donation to East Tennessee Baptist Hospital to establish the Clayton Birthing Center. With his wife, Clayton also made two $1 million donations to Freed-Hardeman University in Henderson, Tennessee, which is near his home town.

== 2020 helicopter crash ==
On August 3, 2020, Clayton, along with his brother Joe, Clayton Holdings VP Flynt Griffin, and developer John McBride, were onboard Clayton's Eurocopter EC130 when it crashed into the Tennessee River near the Sequoyah Hills neighborhood of Knoxville around 7:45 p.m.

Clayton, Griffin, and McBride resurfaced soon after the crash near to the wreckage, and were rescued by a nearby pontoon boat. Joe Clayton's body was recovered next to the wreckage of the helicopter at around 9:30 p.m. He was pronounced dead on arrival.
