= Mori Hosseini =

Iranian-born American businessman and higher education leader

- Born: Morteza Hosseini; 1955 (age 70–71); Mashhad, Iran
- Education: Chelsea College; Embry-Riddle Aeronautical University (BS, MBA)
- Occupation: Businessman
- Known for: Founder of ICI Homes
- Spouse: Forough Hosseini
- Children: 3

Morteza "Mori" Hosseini (born 1955) is an Iranian-born American businessman, political adviser, and higher education leader. He is the founder, chairman, and chief executive officer of ICI Homes, a Florida-based homebuilding company established in 1980. Hosseini has served as chairman of the University of Florida Board of Trustees and chairman of the Board of Trustees of Embry-Riddle Aeronautical University. He has been described as one of the most powerful unelected person in Florida.

== Early life and education ==
Hosseini was born in Mashhad, Iran, in 1955. His father, Ali Hosseini, owned a General Motors automobile dealership. As a child, Hosseini attended classes through the American-Iranian Society and developed an interest in the United States and Western education.

At age 15, he moved to England, where he studied aeronautical engineering at Chelsea College in London. He later immigrated to the United States and attended Embry-Riddle Aeronautical University in Daytona Beach, Florida, earning a Bachelor of Science degree in Aeronautical Studies and a Master of Business Administration.

== Business career ==
While attending college, Hosseini began investing in residential real estate by purchasing and renovating apartment properties. In 1980, he founded ICI Homes.

Under Hosseini's leadership, ICI Homes expanded throughout Florida and became one of the state's largest privately held homebuilding companies. The company has developed residential communities throughout Florida and has been ranked among the nation's largest homebuilders by Builder magazine.

In 2022, ICI Homes reported revenue of approximately $595 million and had constructed more than 10,000 homes.

He has received the Ernst & Young Entrepreneur of the Year Award in the Construction and Real Estate category.

== Higher education leadership ==
In 2010, he was appointed to the Florida Board of Governors, the governing body of the State University System of Florida. He later served as chairman of the board and was involved in advocating for performance-based funding for Florida's public universities.

In 2016, Governor Rick Scott appointed Hosseini to the University of Florida Board of Trustees. He was elected chairman of the board in 2018 and has served multiple terms in that role. The university's faculty union has criticized him for his lack of support for academic freedom.

Hosseini has also served on the Board of Trustees of Embry-Riddle Aeronautical University since 1999. In 2014, he became the first alumnus appointed chairman of the university's board.

== Political activities ==
As of 2024, Hosseini and his corporations have donated $3.5 million to conservative causes, and is considered a close ally of Florida governor Ron DeSantis, advising him on policy matters and in 2023 lending him a $27,500 golf simulator.

Former House Speaker Will Weatherford said of him, “I call Mori for advice [...] For a guy who’s not in politics, he understands people very well."

== Philanthropy ==
The couple have contributed to Embry-Riddle Aeronautical University, Daytona State College, and community initiatives in Volusia County. Several university facilities have been named in recognition of their support, including the Mori Hosseini Student Union at Embry-Riddle Aeronautical University and the Mori Hosseini Center at Daytona State College.

The Hosseinis have also supported Food Brings Hope, a nonprofit organization founded by Forough Hosseini that addresses food insecurity and educational needs among children in Volusia County.
