= Donald R. Horton =

American businessperson (1950–2024); founder of D. R. Horton

- Born: Donald Ray Horton; March 5, 1950; Zack, Arkansas, United States
- Died: May 16, 2024 (aged 74)
- Occupation: Businessman
- Known for: Founder and Chairman of D.R. Horton
- Spouse: Martha Martin (m. 1971)
- Children: 2

Donald Ray Horton (March 5, 1950 – May 16, 2024) was an American businessman and the founder and chairman of D.R. Horton, the largest homebuilder by volume in the United States since 2002. Under his leadership, the company grew from a local operation in Fort Worth, Texas, to a Fortune 500 corporation that has constructed over one million homes.

== Early life and education ==
Horton was born in Zack, Arkansas, and raised in nearby Marshall. He attended Central Arkansas State (now the University of Central Arkansas) to study business before transferring to the University of Oklahoma in 1971 to pursue pharmacy school. Shortly after, he returned to Arkansas to join his father's real estate brokerage.

== Career ==
In 1977, Horton moved to Fort Worth, Texas, where he worked for a local homebuilder. In 1978, he founded his own company, D.R. Horton, Inc., with a loan to build a single house. He successfully sold the home while it was still in the framing stage, a practice he would repeat to scale the business quickly.

=== Expansion and public offering ===
Throughout the 1980s, Horton expanded the company’s footprint across Texas and into other regions of the United States. He took the company public on the NASDAQ in 1992, later moving to the New York Stock Exchange under the ticker DHI in 1995.

Horton served as president and CEO from 1991 until 1998, thereafter remaining as chairman of the board until his death. In 2002, D.R. Horton surpassed its competitors to become the largest homebuilder in the United States by volume.

== Philanthropy ==
In 2001, Horton established Camp Horton, a summer camp designed for the children of D.R. Horton employees. He was also known for corporate philanthropy, including programs that provided homes to deserving employees and supported staff members called to active military duty.

== Personal life and death ==
Horton married Martha "Marty" Martin in 1971. They had two sons, Ryan and Reagan.
