= Moss & Associates =

American construction company

Coordinates: 26.206060°N 80.152669°W

- Company type: Private
- Industry: Construction Management, General Contracting
- Founded: 2004
- Headquarters: Fort Lauderdale, Florida, United States
- Website: www.mosscm.com

Moss & Associates is one of the southeast USA's largest privately held general contractors providing a variety of services including design/build, general construction, construction management and preconstruction consulting for commercial, institutional and residential projects. In addition to its Fort Lauderdale, headquarters, the company has offices in Miami, Tampa, Clearwater, and Ocala, Florida; Greenville, South Carolina; and El Paso, Texas. Moss & Associates is one of the top institutional contractors in the nation, the seventh largest general contractor in Florida and the second largest in South Florida.

Moss has projects in the United States and The Bahamas, including: Nova Southeastern University in Davie, Florida; the Biomedical Research Center for the University of Miami's Institute for Human Genomics; and Bass Pro Shops in Clarksville, Indiana. They are part of the joint venture known as Hunt-Moss, which is constructed the Marlins Park in the Little Havana section of the City of Miami.

== History ==
Bob L. Moss, a 40-year veteran of the construction trade spent 22 years with a Fortune 250 construction firm, where he managed the company's Florida operations and eventually became chairman, president and CEO. He retired from that position and in March 2003 established Moss & Associates in 2004. His son, Scott Moss, was one of the first to join the team and son, Chad Moss, followed soon thereafter. Scott Moss serves as the company's President and Chad Moss is Senior Vice President. As of 2022 the company had approximately 350 employees.

== Operations ==
Moss & Associates is a recipient of the University of South Florida's Sunshine State Safety Award.

As the eighth largest green builder in the southeast, and counted among the top 100 green builders in the United States, Moss & Associates takes a proactive approach to preserving the environment by investing heavily in LEED training for executives and operations and preconstruction teams. By 2009, Moss had 35 employees designated as LEED Accredited Professionals (AP) with an additional 27 in the process of obtaining the AP designation offered by the U.S. Green Building Council. In 2013, Moss & Associates agreed to acquire Peter R. Brown Construction, the construction management at risk business of Atkins.

In 2019, Moss & Associates made an investment in Fortress Identity, a Miami-based company specialising in active and passive biometric identity solutions.

== Major Projects ==
- Florida Marlins Ballpark: Miami
- City Place South Tower: West Palm Beach, Florida
- Downtown Dadeland: Miami, Florida
- Emerald Grande at HarborWalk Village: Destin, Florida
- Himmarshee Landing: Fort Lauderdale, Florida
- The Ivy: Miami, Florida
- The Mint: Miami, Florida
- Bass Pro Shops: Clarksville, Indiana
- University of Miami Biomedical Research Center: Miami, Florida
- Nova Southeastern University, University Center: Davie, Florida
- Nova Southeastern University Performing Arts Center: Davie, Florida
- Nova Southeastern University Dormitory Housing: Davie, Florida
- Leon Medical Center – Flagler: Miami, Florida
- Bay Correctional Facility Expansion: Panama City, Florida
- Gadsden Correctional Facility: Lecanto, Florida
- Palm Beach County Jail Expansion: Belle Glade, Florida
