= Bristol Alliance of Companies =

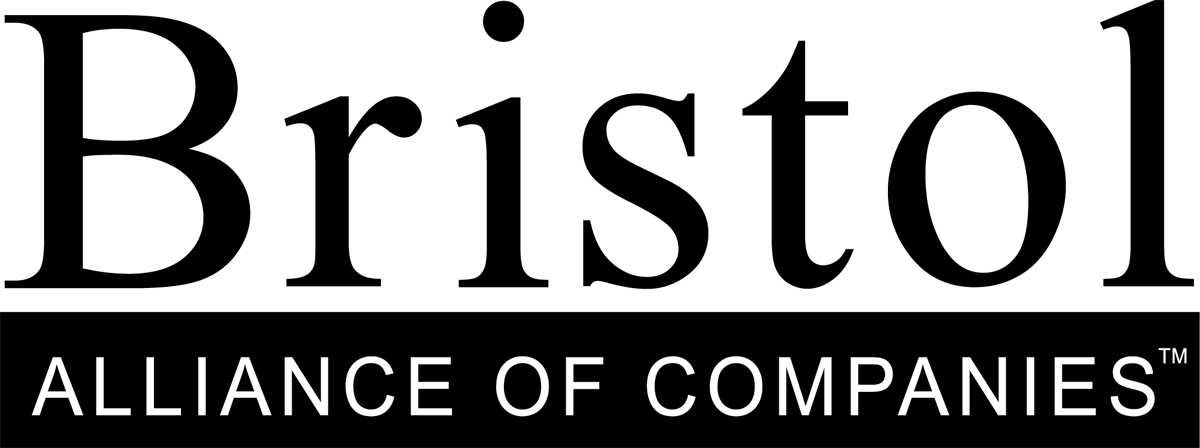
- Industry: Construction
- Website: bristol-companies.com

The Bristol Alliance of Companies is the marketing entity for Bristol Industries, LLC, an Alaskan corporate group which provides a range of services, including civil, structural and mechanical engineering; heavy, civil and vertical construction; environmental remediation; fuel systems; range and unexploded ordnance response services; electrical and telecommunications services; and demolition and site preparation services throughout the United States, its territories and select international locations.

Marketed under the umbrella of the Bristol Alliance of Companies are: Bristol Construction Services, LLC; Bristol Design Build Services, LLC; Bristol Engineering Services Corporation; Bristol Environmental Remediation Services, LLC; Bristol General Contractors, LLC; and Bristol Site Contractors, LLC.

Each Bristol company is a subsidiary of the Bristol Bay Native Corporation, one of thirteen Alaska Native Regional Corporations created under the Alaska Native Claims Settlement Act of 1971 (ANCSA), and is entirely Alaska Native owned.

Corporate headquarters is located in Anchorage, AK. Other office locations are in Wasilla, AK; Tempe, AZ; Denver, CO; Omaha, NE; Wilmington, NC; San Antonio, TX; and Marysville, WA.

== History ==
Bristol Environmental Services Corporation (now known as Bristol Engineering Services Corporation) was formed in 1994 as a wholly owned subsidiary of Bristol Bay Native Corporation. Two years later the company expanded to Kirkland, Wash., to expand its services to the Pacific Northwest, effectively marking its first move into the continental United States. The office was moved to Marysville, Wash., in 2000.

In 1997, the company entered into environmental remediation through a joint venture with Nugget Construction, Inc., on a contracted project in King Salmon, Alaska. Multiple contracts awarded in the following years led to the addition of civil engineering services to Bristol Environmental Services Corporation portfolio of services in 1999, causing the company to be rebranded as Bristol Environmental and Engineering Services Corporation.

After the opening of a new office in San Antonio, Texas, in 2002, Bristol Environmental was awarded multiple construction contracts through clients such as the U.S. Army Corps of Engineers’ Alaska and Seattle districts and the U.S. Department of Navy. In 2003, Bristol Construction Services was formed to specializes in large-scale range development and sustainment services, in addition to general construction services. A year later, Bristol Design Build Services was formed to accommodate vertical construction.

2005 saw the creation of two additional companies, with Bristol Fuels Systems, LLC, formed to provide upgrades and modifications of fuel systems for the U.S. Department of Defense and commercial customers and Bristol Industries, LLC, formed as an administrative arm to support the Bristol companies in various areas. The following year, the concept of the Bristol Alliance of Companies was officially created to market the companies.

Over the next few years, the companies saw heavy expansion, opening new offices in North Carolina and Missouri. During this time, the companies won multiple safety awards for work across the country from the U.S. Army Corps of Engineers’ Alaska, Charleston, Gulf Region, Savannah and Seattle districts, the U.S. Environmental Protection Agency and the Pacific Air Forces, among others.

Bristol General Contractors, LLC, was formed in 2010. The same year, Bristol Environmental Remediation Services received three new contracts from the USACE's Gulf Region and Alaska districts, for remediation services on St. Lawrence Island, Alaska; the investigation of three remote islands in the Alaskan Aleutian Chain; and developing enhancements for storage and fuel delivery systems in Umm Qasr, Iraq, giving the company its most varied set of projects to date. In 2011 and 2012, new offices were opened in Wasilla, Alaska; Denver, Colo.; and Omaha, Neb., further defining its presence throughout the United States.

== Companies ==
There are nine primary organizations marketed under the BAC:

=== Bristol Industries, LLC ===
The administrative arm of the Bristol Alliance of Companies.

=== Bristol Construction Services, LLC ===
Focus on heavy and civil construction, site restoration/development, military range design build, operational range clearance, munitions response services and rail road construction.

=== Bristol Design Build Services, LLC ===
Focus on design build management and vertical construction services.

=== Bristol Engineering Services Corporation ===
Focus on civil engineering, permitting and planning, total project management encompassing planning, design and construction.

=== Bristol Environmental Remediation Services, LLC ===
Focus on environmental consulting, remediation, waste characterization/disposal, hazardous toxic waste removal, and military range and UXO services.

=== Bristol Fuel Systems, LLC ===
Focus on design, construction and testing of bulk fuel systems, piping/pipeline systems and fuel systems.

=== Bristol General Contractors, LLC ===
Focus on heavy and civil construction services, new construction projects, reconstruction, rehabilitation and repairs, water resources, marine facilities and open space improvements.

=== Bristol Prime Contractors, LLC ===
Focus on performing highway, street and bridge construction.

=== Bristol Site Contractors, LLC ===
Focus on performing site preparation, excavating and grading, demolition of buildings and other structures, and septic system installation, as well as range and unexploded ordnance construction support and removal service.

== Awards and honors ==
In 2004 Bristol Environmental and Engineering Services Corporation become the first company of the alliance to graduate from the U.S. Small Business Administration's 8(a) program, a classification that allowed the company to heavily expand its client base.

The construction of a fully sustainable Tactical Equipment Maintenance Facility at Joint Base Lewis-McChord, Wash., by Bristol Design Build Services, LLC, received a LEED Gold Rating by the U.S. Green Building Council, a national benchmark for the design, construction, and operations of high-performance green building. In 2011, BDBS’ work on the TEMF was acknowledged by the Occupational Safety and Health Administration for excellence in the contractor's employee safety and health program, accepting Bristol into its Voluntary Protection Program and recognizing their work as a "workplace safety and health star.” The company was also awarded with the VPP merit status in September 2010 for the construction of a single-story building at the same base.

Meanwhile, on multiple occasions Bristol has been named the U.S. Army Corps of Engineers’ Safety Contractor of the Year, notably for the work of Bristol Environmental Remediation Services, LLC, earning the distinction from both USACE's Alaska (2005) and Wilmington districts (2009, 2010). The company has also received more than twenty five additional awards throughout its decade of services with the USACE across its Alaska, Wilmington, Charleston, and Gulf districts.

In 2008, Bristol Design Build's work on the Eielson Chapel Center was awarded the Pacific Air Forces’ Top Concept Design Category Award, allowing it to be placed in the running for the U.S. Air Force's highest honor, the Design Awards Program.
