= Schumacher Homes =

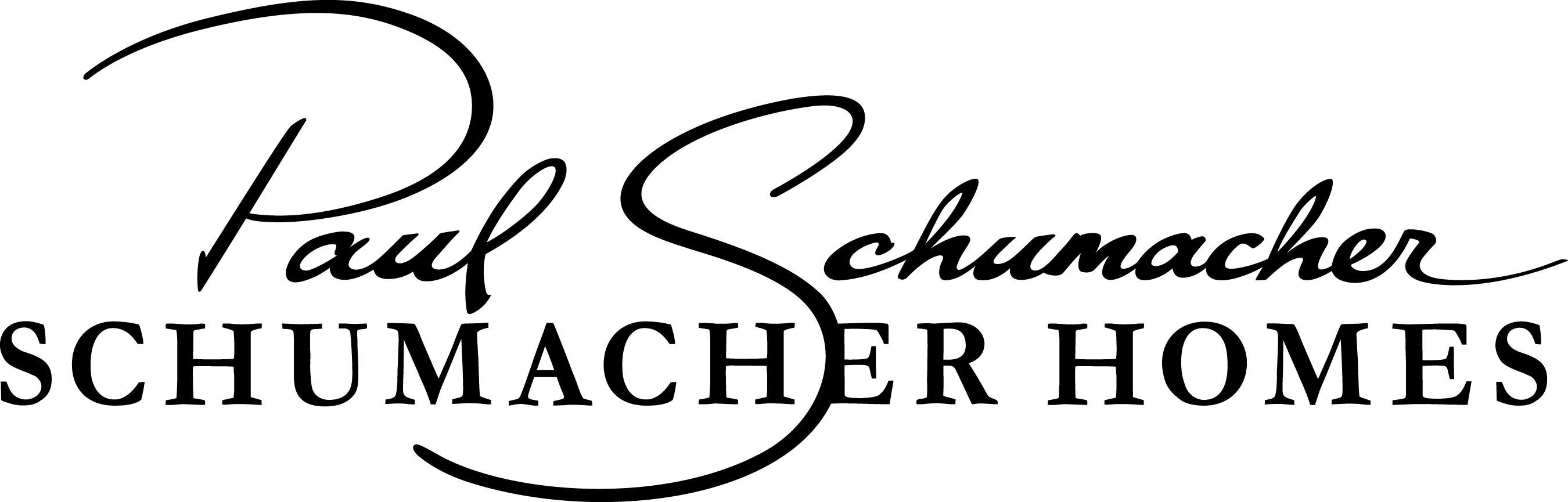
- Type: Private
- Industry: Home construction
- Founded: 1992, Canton, Ohio
- Founder: Paul Schumacher
- Headquarters: Canton, Ohio, United States
- Area served: Georgia, Indiana, Kentucky, Louisiana, Michigan, Mississippi, North Carolina, Ohio, Pennsylvania, South Carolina, Tennessee, Texas, Virginia, and West Virginia
- Key people: Paul Schumacher (Founder and CEO)
- Website: www.schumacherhomes.com

Schumacher Homes, headquartered in Canton, Ohio, is a custom homebuilder in the United States.

== History ==
Founded in 1992 by Paul Schumacher, Schumacher Homes specializes in designing and constructing customizable homes tailored to individual client preferences.

== Locations ==
Schumacher Homes has 30 locations and operates in 14 states across the United States:

- Georgia
- Indiana
- Kentucky
- Louisiana
- Michigan
- Mississippi
- North Carolina
- Ohio
- Pennsylvania
- South Carolina
- Tennessee
- Texas
- Virginia
- West Virginia

== Financial services ==
Schumacher Homes provides financing options through its affiliate, Schumacher Mortgage LLC, which specializes in construction loans.
