= WithersRavenel =

Multidisciplinary civil engineering firm

- Formerly: Withers & Ravenel
- Type: Private company
- Industry: Civil engineering
- Founded: 1983; 43 years ago
- Founders: Hamilton “Tony” Withers and Sam Ravenel
- Headquarters: Cary, North Carolina, United States
- Area served: Southeast United States
- Products: Engineering and consulting services
- Number of employees: 460 (2026)
- Website: withersravenel.com

WithersRavenel, formerly Withers & Ravenel, is an American multidisciplinary civil engineering firm headquartered in Cary, North Carolina. Founded in 1983, WithersRavenel has nine office locations across North Carolina in Asheville, Cary, Charlotte, Greensboro, Pittsboro, Powells Point, Raleigh, and Wilmington.

WithersRavenel became an Employee Stock Ownership Program (ESOP) company in 2014 and, in 2019, WithersRavenel completed the transition to become a 100% employee-owned Employee Stock Ownership Plan (ESOP) company.

Currently, WithersRavenel has more than 460 employees serving a variety of public and private sector clients.

== History ==
WithersRavenel was established in 1983 as Withers & Ravenel, P.A., by Hamilton “Tony” Withers and Sam Ravenel in Cary. For the remainder of the decade, the company would add its first employees and take on its maiden projects.

In the 1990s, WithersRavenel hired Jim Canfield, the company's current President, added surveying services, and formed Withers & Ravenel Environmental Engineering. Throughout the decade, the company took on private and public projects working for clients such as Badin Shores and the North Carolina National Guard.

In 2001, the company officially changed its name to Withers & Ravenel, Inc. In the years to follow, WithersRavenel would surpass 200 employees and open new offices in Greensboro and Wilmington.

The 2010s saw the company re-brand itself as WithersRavenel in conjunction with becoming an ESOP company. In addition, WithersRavenel opened three new offices in Asheville, Pittsboro, and Raleigh. WithersRavenel opened its newest office location in 2021 in Charlotte.

The company celebrated the 40th anniversary of its founding in 2023.

== Services & Markets ==
WithersRavenel provides civil engineering, surveying, planning, environmental, funding, financial, and infrastructure consulting services. Its principal service areas include construction administration, design and planning, environmental services, funding and finance, geomatics and surveying, infrastructure asset management, land and site development, stormwater, and water and wastewater utilities.

The firm works across three primary markets. Its land development practice serves private developers through site evaluation, planning, permitting, engineering, surveying, environmental, stormwater, utility, and construction-related services. Its public-sector work includes consulting for municipalities, counties, councils of government, utility districts, and state, federal, and Tribal agencies.

== Awards ==
| Year | Award | Ranking | Issuing Organization |
|---|---|---|---|
| 2017 | Best Places to Work | N/A | Triangle Business Journal |
| 2017 | PSMJ Premier Award for Client Satisfaction | N/A | PSMJ | Resources, Inc. |
| 2018 | Engineering Firms in the Triangle | 9th | Triangle Business Journal |
| 2019 | Fastest-Growing Company in the Triangle | 15th | Triangle Business Journal |
| 2019 | Top 500 Design Firms | 451st | Engineering News-Record |
| 2019 | PSMJ Premier Award for Client Satisfaction | N/A | PSMJ | Resources, Inc. |
| 2020 | ESOP Company of the Year | N/A | Carolinas Chapter | The ESOP Association |
| 2020 | PSMJ Premier Award for Client Satisfaction | N/A | PSMJ | Resources, Inc. |
| 2020 | Fastest-Growing Company in the Triangle | 37th | Triangle Business Journal |
| 2021 | Space Award | N/A | Triangle Business Journal |
| 2021 | PSMJ Premier Award for Client Satisfaction | N/A | PSMJ | Resources, Inc. |
| 2021 | Fastest-Growing Middle-Market Company | N/A | Business North Carolina |
| 2021 | Fastest-Growing Company in the Triangle | 35th | Triangle Business Journal |
| 2022 | Top 100 Fastest-Growing AEC Firms in the United States and Canada | N/A | Zweig Group |
| 2022 | Top Southeast Design Firms | 45th | Engineering News Record |
| 2022 | Fastest-Growing Company in the Triangle | 39th | Triangle Business Journal |
| 2023 | Top 500 Design Firms | 323rd | Engineering News Record |
| 2023 | Top 100 Fastest-Growing AEC Firms in the United States and Canada | 36th | Zweig Group |
| 2023 | Fastest-Growing Company in the Triangle | 43rd | Triangle Business Journal |
| 2024 | Top 100 Fastest-Growing AEC Firms in the United States and Canada | N/A | Zweig Group |
| 2024 | Zweig Marketing Excellence Award - Special Events Category | N/A | Zweig Group |
| 2024 | CX-cellence Award Winner - Professional Services | N/A | Client Savvy |
| 2024 | PSMJ Premier Award for Client Satisfaction | N/A | PSMJ | Resources, Inc. |
| 2024 | Mid-Market 40 Award | 21st | Business North Carolina |
| 2024 | Fastest-Growing Company in the Triangle | 30th | Triangle Business Journal |
| 2024 | Platinum CX-cellence Award Winner - Client Experience | N/A | Client Savvy |
| 2024 | Healthiest Employers Triad Winner | N/A | Healthiest Employers |
| 2025 | CX Gold Award for Excellence in Client Experience | N/A | Client Savvy |
| 2025 | CX-cellence Award - Professional Services | N/A | Client Savvy |
| 2025 | Top 500 Design Firms | 291st | Engineering News Record |
| 2025 | Top 100 Fastest-Growing AEC Firms in the United States and Canada | 66th | Zweig Group |
| 2025 | Fastest-Growing Company in the Triangle | 16th | Triangle Business Journal |
