= The Stewart/Perry Company =

American construction company

- Type: Private company
- Industry: Construction
- Founded: 1984; 42 years ago
- Founders: Merrill H. Stewart Jr; Charles Perry
- Headquarters: 4855 Overton Road, Birmingham, Alabama, United States
- Area served: United States
- Key people: Merill H. Stewart Jr. (Chairperson); Heath Cather (President)
- Services: Commercial construction; Civil Management; Design-build
- Website: stewartperry.com

The Stewart/Perry Company is an American commercial general contractor headquartered in Birmingham, Alabama, United States. The company was founded in 1984 and it operates mainly in the Southeastern United States with select projects nationwide for some core clients providing services for retail, light-industrial, adaptive reuse, mixed-use, multifamily and historic renovation projects.

== History and operations ==
The Stewart/Perry Company was established in 1984 by Merrill H. Stewart Jr and Charles Perry. The company is licensed by the Alabama Licensing Board for General Contractors and provides commercial construction, design-build and civil management services.

In 2008, the company opened its headquarters located on a 16-acre wooded campus at 4855 Overton Road in Birmingham, Alabama. The headquarters was designed by the Birmingham-based architecture firm HKW and it achieved the LEED (Leadership in Energy and Environmental Design) certification from the US Green Building Council.

Stewart/Perry's commercial client portfolio includes national retailers and commercial developments such as the Target Corporation, Buc-ee's, TJX companies such as HomeGoods and Marshalls, PetSmart, Five Below, Ulta Beauty, Ross Stores, Academy Sports + Outdoors, Onelife Fitness and Dick's Sporting Goods.

The company has completed various adaptive reuse and historic renovation projects in Downtown Birmingham including the restoration of the Lyric Theatre, the residential conversion of the Thomas Jefferson Hotel as well as the redevelopment of the former Edwards Chevrolet Building into Nextec, a 65,000-square foot technology hub and workspace for startup businesses.
