= Deltec Homes =

American home construction company

- Type: Private
- Industry: Home production
- Founded: 1955
- Founder: Clyde Kinser
- Headquarters: Asheville, North Carolina, United States
- Website: Official website

Deltec Homes is an American home construction company located in Asheville, North Carolina. The company builds round-shaped houses throughout the US, the Caribbean, and other locations internationally. Deltec Homes has received multiple sustainability awards through the U.S. Department of Energy's Zero Energy Ready Home program and has been featured in national and international media coverage discussing their hurricane-resistant design, energy efficiency, and residential architecture.

== History ==
Deltec Homes was founded by Clyde Kinser in 1955 as Kinser Home Insulation of Asheville. Kinser sold insulation door to door, listening to his customers' needs, and then sending a crew out the next day to install the insulation. He soon realized his customers wanted to conserve energy in many ways, so he broadened the company’s energy efficient products to aluminum doors and windows, and later vinyl products, and changed the name of the company to Kinco Corporation.

Kinser and his sons purchased designs from another Asheville company called Rondesics who made a round structure, then made substantial improvements to create the compression ring and tension collar roof system. This company, called Delta Technologies, served one customer initially but as the popularity of these resort homes increased, other resort companies purchased Deltec homes and the commercial building applications grew.

In the mid-1980s the business shifted from commercial applications to residential homes and became Deltec Homes. As of 2014, more than 85% of the company's homes are primary family residences. Deltec Homes operated as a subsidiary of Kinco until Kinco was sold in 1994. At that time Deltec was spun out as a separate company.

Deltec Homes is a privately held company. Robert Kinser was chairman of the board, but died on December 13, 2017. In 2014, the company built its 5000th home.

== Products ==
Deltec Homes produces resilient, high-performance homes. They include both the 360-degree collection of round homes and the Renew collection, including the Ridgeline and Solar Farmhouse models. They are best known for their round-shaped homes that are more hurricane resistant than a traditionally shaped house while being more energy efficient naturally. After working with Appalachian State University's Solar Decathlon award winners, the company broadened their homes lines, introducing the Renew collection of homes. The solar farmhouse has since been introduced, specifically designed to be net-zero energy efficient. The Deltec factory is completely powered by renewable energy.

== Awards and recognition ==
- 2019 Department of Energy Zero Energy Ready Housing Innovation Award winner
- 2021 Department of Energy Zero Energy Ready Housing Innovation Award grand winner
- 2023 Department of Energy Zero Energy Ready Housing Innovation Award winner
