= Fischer Homes =

American home building company

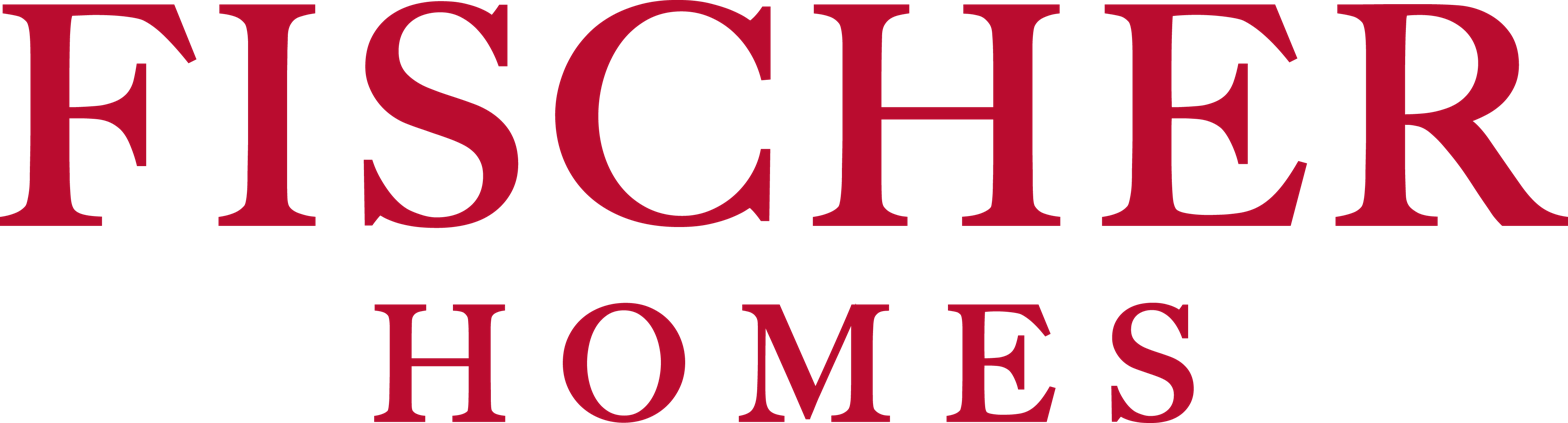
- Type: Private
- Industry: Homebuilding
- Founded: 1980; 46 years ago
- Founders: Henry Fischer; Elaine Fischer
- Headquarters: Erlanger, Kentucky, United States
- Area served: Midwest, Southeast
- Key people: Greg Fischer (Chairman); Tim McMahon (CEO); Jay Smith (President and COO)
- Products: Single-family homes, Townhouses, Condominiums, Patio homes
- Revenue: ▲US$1.5 billion (2022)
- Parent: The Fischer Group
- Website: fischerhomes.com

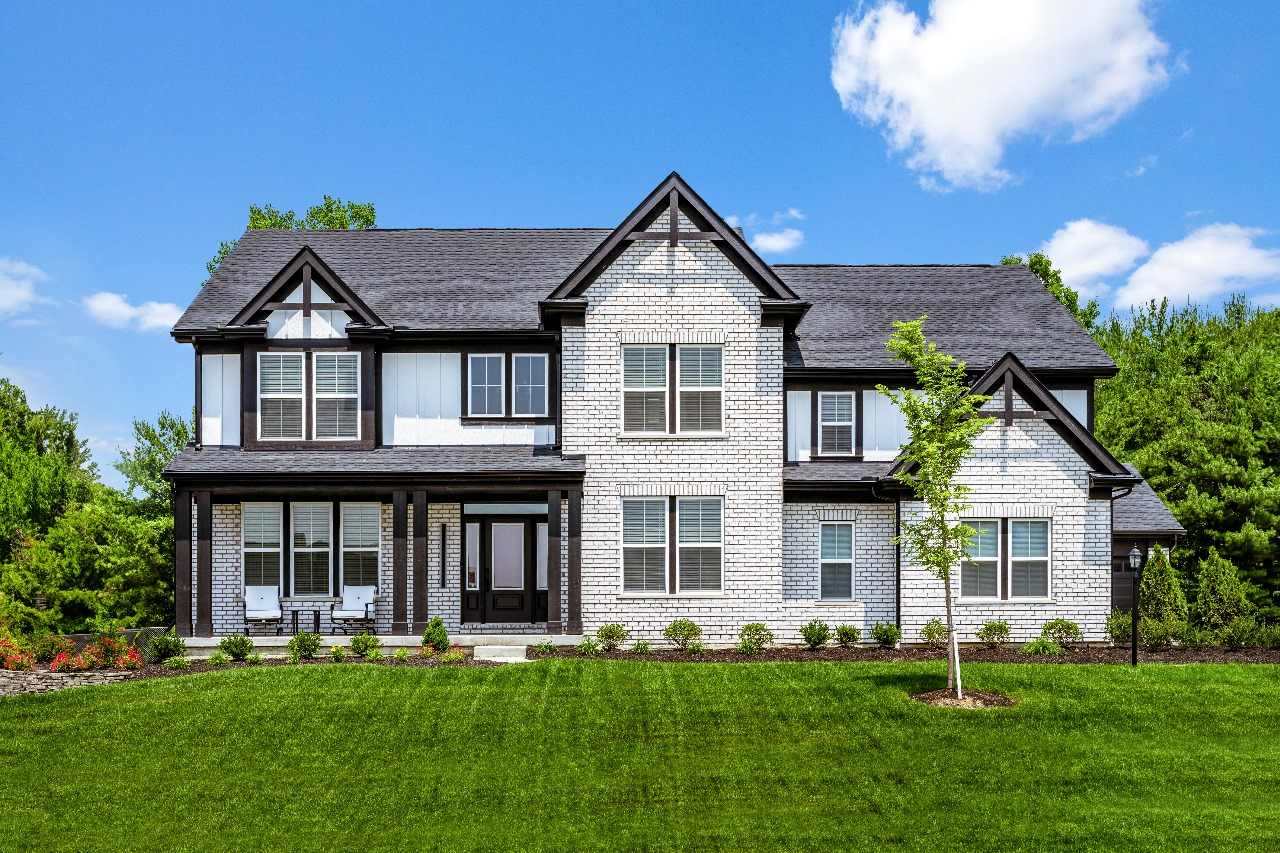
Fischer Homes chesapeake exterior

Fischer Homes is a privately held homebuilding company based in Erlanger, Kentucky.

== History ==
Fischer Homes was founded in 1980 in Northern Kentucky by Henry and Elaine Fischer. In its early years, the company focused on the Northern Kentucky and Greater Cincinnati area, building roughly 300 to 350 homes a year. Greg Fischer serves as the Chairman of the company.

The company is part of the Fischer Group, which also includes Grand Communities, Homestead Title, Victory Mortgage, and Acendion Collective. Since its foundation, the company has built over 40,000 houses.

Bob Hawksley joined the company in 1990s as a chief executive officer. During his tenure, between 2016 and 2022, annual home closings increased from about 350 to more than 3,000 across eight markets, while revenue rose from $637 million in 2018 to $1.5 billion by 2022. In 2020, the company had a total revenue of around $829 million.

In October 2022, Tim McMahon was promoted from president and chief operating officer to chief executive officer. Hawksley became CEO Emeritus and retired in February 2023 after 28 years with the company. At the same time, Jay Smith was promoted to president and chief operating officer.

During the 2020s, Fischer Homes expanded into several new markets, including Georgia, Florida, and North Carolina. In December 2023, the company entered the Florida market through the acquisition of Samuel Taylor Homes, a Panama City Beach based builder founded in 2011.

In December 2023, Fischer Homes partnered with Snap One's Clare Controls and Guardian Alarm to offer smart home security systems in new homes.

In May 2025, Fischer Homes announced plans to relocate its corporate headquarters from Erlanger to Covington, Kentucky. The relocation is expected to be completed by 2027.

== Philanthropy ==
Fischer Homes has supported St. Jude Children's Research Hospital through the St. Jude Dream Home Giveaway program for many years. The company has built 35 Dream Homes and raised more than $34 million for the hospital's mission as of 2025.

In 2022, Fischer Homes built and give away three St. Jude Dream Homes in a single year and received the Dr. Donald Mack Lifetime Achievement Award from St. Jude in 2024.

The company also contributed to community amenities including the Pampers Nursing Suite at Great American Ballpark for the Cincinnati Reds in 2015, the Family Care Center at Kings Island in 2016, and the Welcome Home exhibit at the Cincinnati Children's Museum in 2025.
