= O'Donnell and Naccarato =

American structural engineering firm

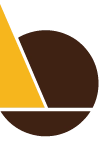

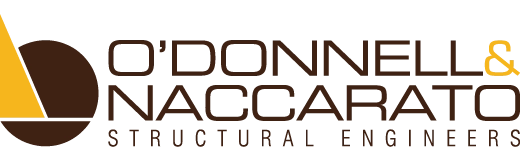
- Formerly: Seymour Greenberg (1954–1974); Greenberg, O'Donnell and Naccarato (1974–1981)
- Company type: Structural Engineering
- Industry: Civil engineering
- Founded: 1954; 71 years ago in Philadelphia, United States
- Founder: Seymour Greenberg
- Number of locations: 6 (2023)
- Area served: Northeast United States
- Key people: William O’Donnell; Peter Naccarato
- Revenue: $63.7M (2022)
- Owner: Peter Naccarato
- Number of employees: 129 (2022)
- Website: www.o-n.com

O'Donnell and Naccarato (O&N) is a structural engineering firm in Philadelphia, Pennsylvania with offices in New York City, New Jersey, Florida, and Indiana.

== History ==
The firm was founded in 1954 as Seymour Greenberg, named after the founder and original principle engineer, Seymour Greenberg, and operated out of the Philadelphia Bourse building. The firm hired two more principle engineers, William O’Donnell and Peter Naccarato and the name of the firm was changed in 1974 to Greenberg, O'Donnell and Naccarato, however, by 1981 the firm was renamed O'Donnell and Naccarato. William O'Donnell III was a Philadelphia native, born on January 14, 1944. After graduating from the Cardinal Dougherty High School in 1961, O'Donnell earned an undergraduate degree in civil engineering from Villanova in 1965. O'Donnell served in the U.S. Army as a Sergeant and engineer during the Vietnam War, however, never saw combat and spent the entire war in Korea. O'Donnell died on December 15, 2019. Anthony Naccarato is a graduate of Villanova's class of 1988 and since the passing of William O'Donnell has been the sole President of the company.

== Engineering developments ==
- In 1962 Seymour Greenberg pioneered the use of exposed steel structural elements within an interior space to comport with the overall aesthetic of a property resulting in a fundamental change to interior design and Industrial style interiors.
- In 2007 O'Donnell and Naccarato developed a series of self-compacting concrete beams in association with Villanova University to mitigate pre-stress loss and camber in beams.
- In 2010 O'Donnell and Naccarato developed "mini piles" during their designing of The University Medical Center at Princeton to help reduce the live load and the overturning force associated with full length piles.
- In 2021 O'Donnell and Naccarato joined the ASCE's Structural Engineers 2050 Program, working to develop ways to wholly eliminate the use of embodied carbon within concrete to dramatically reduce global CO_{2} emissions.
- In 2021 O'Donnell and Naccarato revolutionized blast protection during the design of the Frank J. Guarini Justice Complex. Following the Oklahoma City bombing, the United States Federal government has been pursuing new and novel solutions to blast protection within federal buildings. The Frank J. Guarini Justice Complex uses a series of massive V-shaped trusses made from steel ranging from W14x233 up to W14x730 to form asymmetrical cantilevers. Combined with four elevator cores and a six-foot thick concrete pad on the ground level, the Frank J. Guarini Justice Complex could take a previously catastrophic ground level blast and suffer little overall structural damage.
- In 2023 O'Donnell and Naccarato developed the Children's Hospital of the King's Daughter, during which, the firm committed to a fully steel skeleton innovating wide-flange brace elements to ensure future flexibility, leaving the hospital with room to expand as its programs and technologies change.

== Offices ==
- Philadelphia: O&N's original and oldest office, the firm moved into the office in 1981 during the rebranding process from Greenberg, O'Donnell and Naccarato. Serving as the headquarters for the entire firm, working primarily on the firm's tall and super-tall building projects.
- Mountainside: O&N's second office, established in 2013 to better service the firm's projects in North Jersey and New York City, the office primarily designs new parking garages, as well as several assisted living facilities.
- New York City: Established following an expansion into projects in New York State, the New York City office was founded in 2015 and focuses on facade restoration, as well as auxiliary services for the firm's other offices.

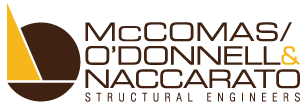
Indianapolis office Logo

- Indianapolis: Established in 1991 as the headquarters of the McComas Engineering firm, in 2019 the firm was bought by O&N to become their Indianapolis office. The office works on the firm's Midwest projects and continues McComas' design and restoration services. The office retains the McComas name and is officially McComas/O’Donnell & Naccarato
- Miami: Established in 1992 as the headquarters of Douglas Wood Associates, Inc, the firm was purchased by O&N in 2022 to expand the firm's presence into Florida. The office continues Douglas Wood's reputation for restoration and renovation work, primarily working on existing buildings. The office retains the Wood name and is officially Wood/O’Donnell & Naccarato
- Orlando: Established in 2022, the O&N Orlando office was established following the firm's expansion into Florida. The firm specializes in the design of hospitals as well as facade and parking garage restorations.

== Mergers and acquisitions ==
=== Douglas Wood and Associates ===
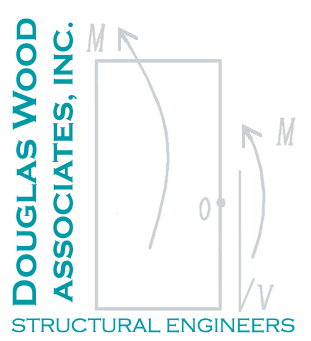
Douglas Wood's logo prior to acquisition

Douglas Wood & Associates was founded by its eponymous Douglas Wood in 1992 specializing in historical buildings, sculptures, medical, and hospitality buildings. The firm received praise for its structural design of the award-winning Doral Park Pavilion in Doral, Florida, a 25 by 50-foot concrete pavilion designed to look like natural boulders that was entirely designed in 3D modeling. Seeking to expand into the Florida market, especially due to the building boom in Miami, O’Donnell & Naccarato acquired Douglas Wood due to their established reputation as a structural engineering firm, specifically in the fields that O’Donnell & Naccarato already work on, namely hospitals and facade restoration. At the time of the merger, DW&A had 23 employees.

=== McComas ===
McComas' logo prior to acquisition

Founded by Rodney McComas in 1991 and based out of Carmel, Indiana, McComas engineering serviced Ohio, Kentucky, and Tennessee as well as the Chicago and St. Louis metro areas. At the time of the merger in 2019, McComas had 12 employees, and O’Donnell & Naccarato had begun to seek expansion beyond Pennsylvania, New Jersey and New York. Rodney McComas was also the president of the Indiana branch of the Structural Engineers Association.

== Construction Management ==
O'Donnell and Naccarato also maintains a construction management wing that works with property owners and municipal government to keep projects on schedule and to cut out waste spending by contractors and architects. O'Donnell and Naccarato managed the construction of a $1.7 million Fire academy in Plymouth Township, being paid $171,000 by Montgomery County to ensure the project remained on schedule.
