= Shannon & Wilson =

- Company type: Private
- Industry: Civil engineering
- Founded: 1954; 72 years ago, in Seattle, Washington, U.S
- Founders: William L. Shannon; Stanley D. Wilson
- Headquarters: Seattle, Washington, U.S
- Area served: Worldwide
- Key people: Gerard Buechel, President, Seattle Office Manager and Director; Gregory Fischer, Chairman of the Board and Office Manager of Denver Area
- Services: Geotechnical engineering; Geological engineering; Environmental services; Consulting; Natural resources; Construction; GIS; Hydrogeology; Mining engineering; Seismology; Sustainability
- Revenue: $28 million (2003)
- Number of employees: 300-500
- Website: www.shannonwilson.com

Shannon & Wilson, also known as S & W, is an American geotechnical engineering and environmental consultancy firm headquartered in Seattle, Washington founded in 1954. It was founded by William L. Shannon and Stanley D. Wilson (de), both of whom are alumni of Harvard University. The firm does various forms of work from geotechnical, geological, and environmental services ranging from natural resource management to geophysical surveying for public and private sectors. The company’s markets include dams and levees, design and construction, energy, federal, industrial, property development, transportation, wastewater management, and waterfront facilities. However, over half of their work is devoted to retrofitting and performing safety investigations on transportation projects.

== Founding ==
The firm was founded in 1954 as a result of encouragement by geotechnical engineering pioneer Arthur Casagrande, who Shannon and Wilson were colleagues of.

== Staff ==
In 1998, the firm peaked at 130 employees. However, with the introduction of the tax-cutting Initiative 695 and the recession after that, both of which slashed transportation funding, the number of employees was reduced to 90 and had never exceeded 100 staff members for several years. However, the company has since grown to more than 300 employees in 11 offices nationwide.

== Events ==
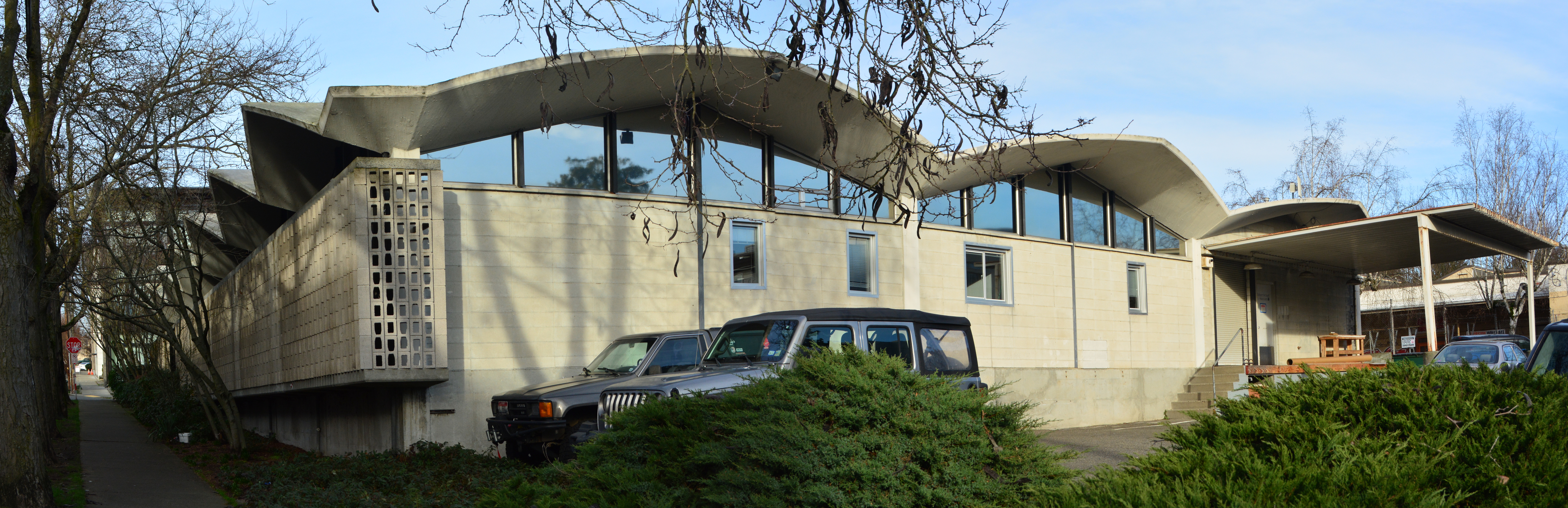
Former headquarters of Shannon & Wilson. This 1960 NBBJ-designed building has Seattle Landmark status.

=== Expansion ===
Although headquartered in Seattle, the firm has offices based in Richland, Portland, St. Louis, Fairbanks, Anchorage, and Denver. The Denver office opened around 2000 to work on a nearby revamp of Interstate 25.

=== Lawsuits ===
In 2002, Shannon & Wilson became involved in a lawsuit as a result of property damage initiated by landslides in a residential area on Perkins Lane on top of Magnolia Hill. The court ended up ruling in favor of Shannon & Wilson.

== Recognition ==
In recognition of their achievements, each year Shannon & Wilson sponsors the Stanley D. Wilson Memorial Lecture at the University of Washington, the Stanley D. Wilson Fellowship at the University of Illinois, and the William L. Shannon Endowed Fellowship at the University of Washington.

== Services ==
- Geotechnical Engineering
- Contamination / Remediation
- Geologic Hazards
- Natural Resources
- Water Resources
- Design-Build
- Tunneling / Underground
- Arctic Engineering
- Construction Management
- Geotechnical Software Development

== Notable projects ==
- SR 520 Floating Bridge
- Alaskan Way Viaduct replacement tunnel
- Link light rail
- Tacoma Narrows Bridge
- Seahawks Stadium
- Seattle Center Monorail
- U.S. Courthouse, Seattle
- Lower Meramec River Wastewater Treatment Plant
- Baumgartner Tunnel
- Boston's Central Artery
- Third Harbor Tunnel
