= ICI Homes =

American custom homebuilding company

- Type: Private
- Industry: Homebuilding
- Founded: 1979
- Founder: Mori Hosseini
- Headquarters: Daytona Beach, Florida, United States of America
- Key people: Mori Hosseini (CEO); Tom McCall (COO, CFO)
- Revenue: US$343 million (2015)
- Divisions: Central Florida, East Central, Mid-Florida, North Florida
- Website: icihomes.com

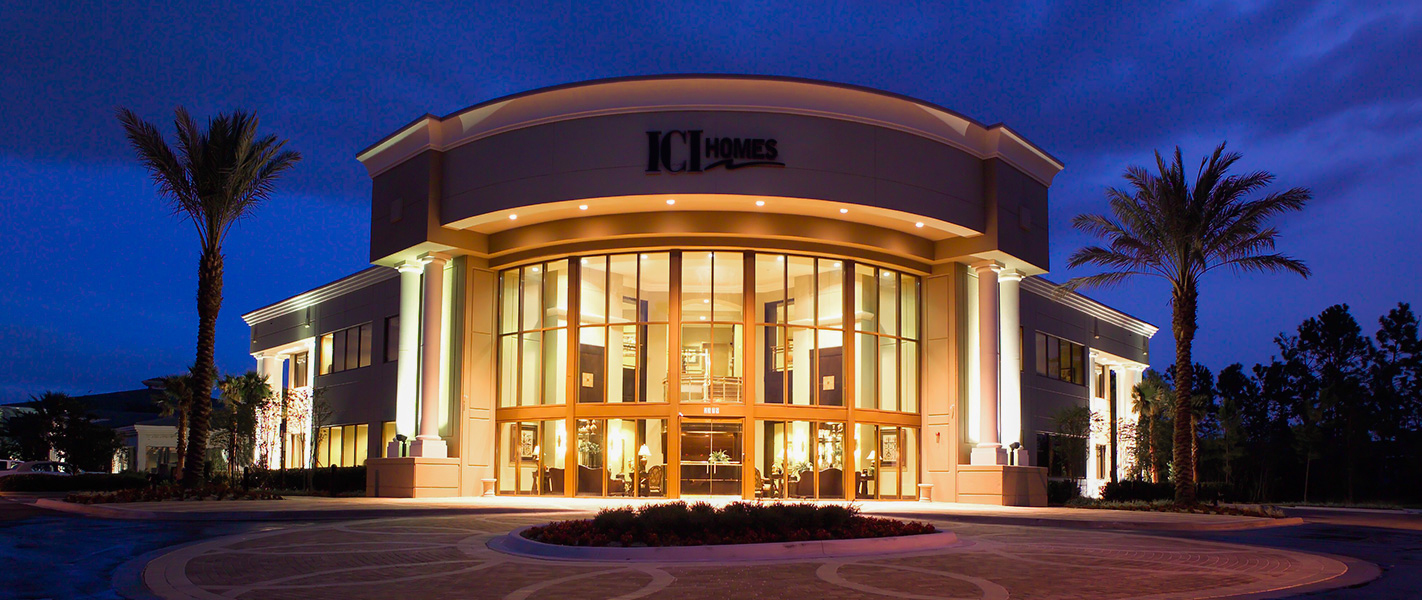
ICI Homes Corporate Headquarters

ICI Homes is a custom homebuilding company based in the United States, founded in 1979 as Intervest Construction, Inc. in Daytona Beach, Florida, its present-day headquarters. The company has built over 10,000 homes since its founding.

In 2014, ICI Homes was ranked the largest homebuilder and the 4th largest family-owned business in Volusia County.

== History ==
Intervest Construction Inc. was founded in Daytona Beach in 1979 by Mori Hosseini. Initially having only two employees, Mori built up the company while working towards an MBA at Embry–Riddle Aeronautical University.

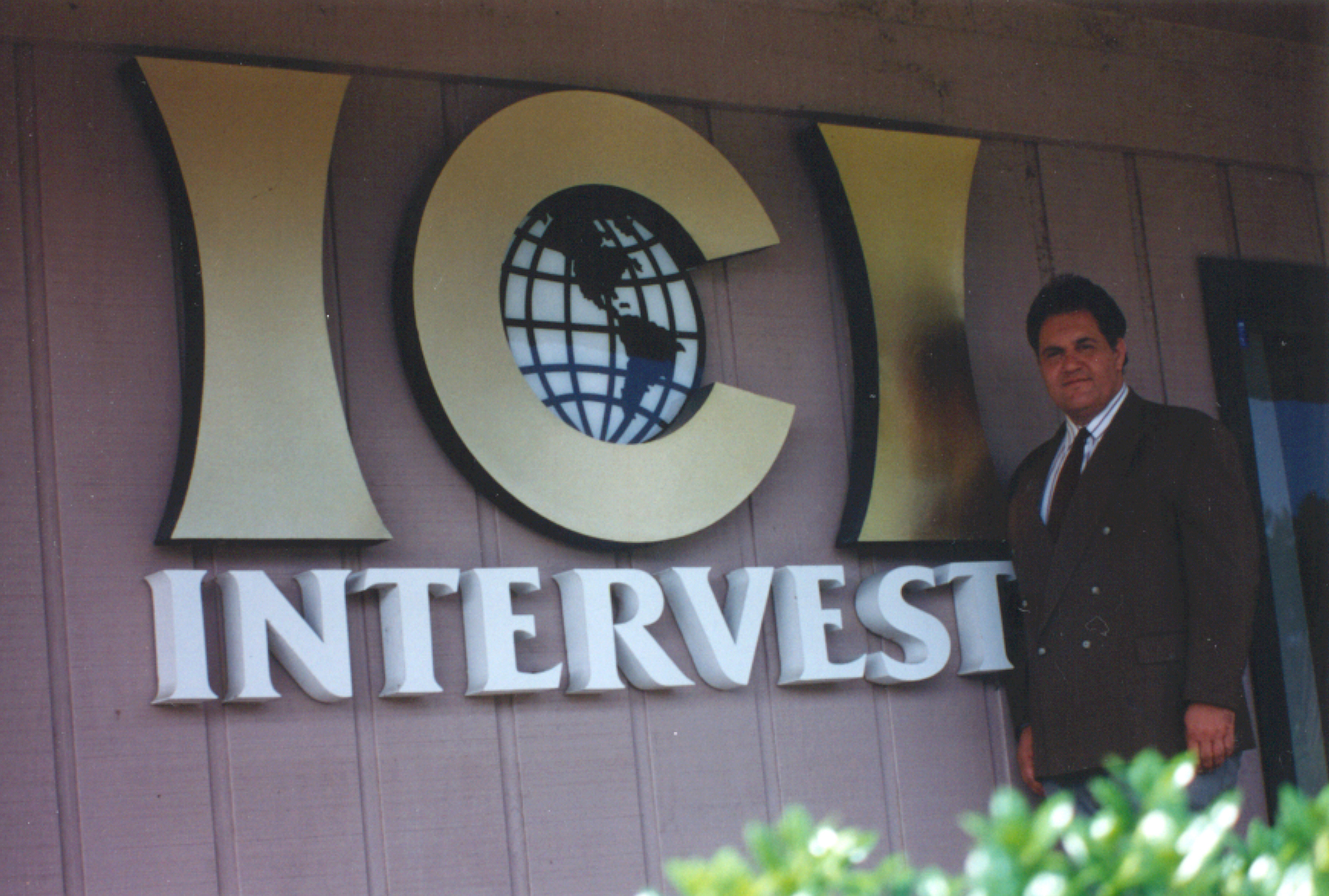
Mori Hosseini poses in front of the original Intervest Construction building.

In 1984, the North Florida Division was established. By the end of the year, construction had started on 54 homes in the Jacksonville area. By the company's 10th anniversary in 1990, it had built more than 200 homes.

Intervest Construction Inc. started operating under the ICI Homes moniker in 1998 and its corporate logo was launched which is still in use today.

In 2000, at the company's 20th anniversary, the company launched its Central Florida division, primarily focusing on the Orlando and Tampa areas. The company also built homes in communities in Georgia and Tennessee, but returned to Florida exclusivity after a couple years. At the end of the 2003 fiscal year, ICI Homes had marked a total of 10,000 closed homes.

The subprime mortgage crisis that began in 2007 hit the new home construction industry especially hard. ICI Homes prevailed by expanding its efforts into other niches, such as timeshares, condominiums, and renovations. As the market stabilized and improved, the company refocused its efforts back to custom homebuilding.

In 2014, the company added six new communities. In 2015, The Northeast Florida Builders Association (NEFBA) named ICI Homes its 2014 Builder of the Year.

In June 2020, the company acquired 571.86 acres(for $8.42 million) in St. Johns County, Florida near Creekside High School for a mixed-use community called the Crossroads.

== EQ FACTOR ==
All ICI Homes are rated against the company's own EQ FACTOR—a program which rates its homes in terms of quality and energy efficiency—and the national Home energy rating by the Residential Energy Services Network (RESNET).

ICI Homes launched its most energy efficient home, The Emerald, in February 2009 at Plantation Bay Golf & Country Club. The Northeast Florida Builders Council (NEFBC) bestowed its Laurel Award for Best Interior Merchandising in a Detached Home priced at more than US$1 million. The Emerald has been praised by environmentalists, builders, and planners for energy efficiency and environmental quality. It received more than 13,000 visits in 2009, a record for the company.
