= WPCS International =

WPCS International Incorporated (Nasdaq: WPCS) is an American corporation with global operations that is headquartered in Exton, Pennsylvania. The company is a design-build engineering firm focused on the deployment of wireless networks and related services including site design, technology integration, electrical contracting, construction and maintenance. WPCS serves the specialty communication systems sector which includes public services, healthcare and alternative energy and the wireless infrastructure sector which includes work performed for commercial wireless carriers. WPCS has a diverse customer base of corporations, government entities and education institutions worldwide. WPCS was founded in 2002 by Andrew Hidalgo and has approximately 500 employees.
