= Versar =

Versar, Inc.
- Traded as: NYSE: VSR
- Industry: Program and Construction Management, Environmental Services, and Security Systems
- Founded: 1969
- Headquarters: Springfield, VA
- Key people: Dwane Stone (CEO)
- Revenue: ▲US$ 102.622 million (2013.6)
- Net income: ▲US$ 2.403 million (2013.6)
- Total assets: ▲US$57.377 million (2013.6)
- Total equity: ▲US$37.624 million (2013.6)
- Number of employees: 400 (2013)
- Website: www.versar.com

Versar, Inc. is a project management company providing technical and management support to government and companies in the world. The company was founded on July 14, 1969. The company operates in three segments including Engineering and Construction Management, Environmental Services, and Professional Services. It offers project scoping/development, cost estimation, construction oversight through Engineering and Construction Management. The company offers environmental solutions through Environmental Services. The company offers solid waste management, water program management, staff augmentation through Professional Services.

== History ==
In 1969, Versar, Inc. was founded in Springfield, Virginia. In January 2014, the company selected Locus Technologies (Locus) Environmental Information Management (EIM) software to be the preferred environmental data management system.

In 1997, the company acquired a majority interest in Science Management Corp.

In February 2014, the Company completed the acquisition of Lime Energy, Inc.'s Facility Repair and Renewal (FRR) business unit.

In November 2017, Versar was acquired by Kingswood Capital Management for $1.6 million.
