= Wick Buildings =

American manufacturer of shelters

- Type: Private company
- Industry: Construction
- Founded: 1954
- Headquarters: Mazomanie, Wisconsin, US
- Key people: John F. Wick (Founder); Allan Breidenbach (President/General Manager)
- Products: Commercial Buildings; Industrial Buildings; Horse Buildings; Agricultural Buildings; Barndominiums
- Number of employees: 200
- Website: www.wickbuildings.com

Wick Buildings, Inc. is a manufacturer of shelter products, which have been offered since its founding in 1954. Wick Buildings are wood-frame structures covered with formed sheet steel. These structures serve a variety of building and shelter needs and desires including commercial offices, mini-warehouses, churches, agricultural buildings and homes. Wick buildings currently serves 37 states from Colorado to New York.

== History ==
Wick Buildings, Inc. ("Wick") is an ESOP (Employee stock ownership plan) Wisconsin company. Wick Buildings was founded in 1954 by John F. Wick, incorporated in 1958, and re-organized in March 2010.

Through continued growth, Wick Buildings has grown to become a major producer of shelter products. These shelter products include post-frame agricultural and commercial buildings. All Wick shelter products are sold through a network of independent builders.

In the early days, these buildings were used primarily on farms in the Midwest as replacement for the two-story dairy barn. Wick Buildings consist of a wood-frame structure covered with sheet steel panels. Clear span trusses (up to 100 feet in width) are fabricated in the plant. Siding and roofing are formed and cut from rolled steel at Wick's production facilities. These components, together with the necessary pre-cut lumber, doors and trim material, are loaded on semi-trailers and delivered to the buyer's site. The buildings are either assembled on site by company personnel or the crews of Wick Building's independent contractors ("Builders").

With the sale of over 75,000 buildings since its founding in 1954, Wick Buildings is one of the nation’s largest producers of post-frame buildings.

These buildings include, but not limited too, agricultural, suburban, barndominiums, equestrian, pole barns and pole barn homes. Wick's post-frame buildings are marketed and sold under the "Wick Buildings" trademark.

== About John Wick - Founder of Wick Buildings ==
John F. Wick is a Wisconsin native and graduate of the University of Wisconsin–Madison.

With a background in agriculture and advanced schooling in business finance and civil engineering, Mr. John Wick started the business with the sale and construction of post-frame metal buildings (pole buildings) out of Mazomanie, Wisconsin. The production facility and North American Headquarters for Wick Buildings and products are located at the Wick Manufacturing Complex in Mazomanie, Wisconsin. (25 miles west of Madison, Wisconsin off Highway 14 and on Walter Road in Mazomanie, Wisconsin.)

== In pop culture ==
Derek Kolstad, grandson of the company's founder John F. Wick and writer for the 2014 American neo-noir action thriller film John Wick, named the film and its eponymous character after his grandfather. John F. Wick stated, "I was tickled by Derek using my name for a movie, and the hit man character was frosting on the cake."

== See also ==
- Wick Buildings Web Site
- Wick Buildings Facebook Page
- Wick Building Pinterest Page
