= Willdan Group =

American consulting company

Willdan Group, Inc.
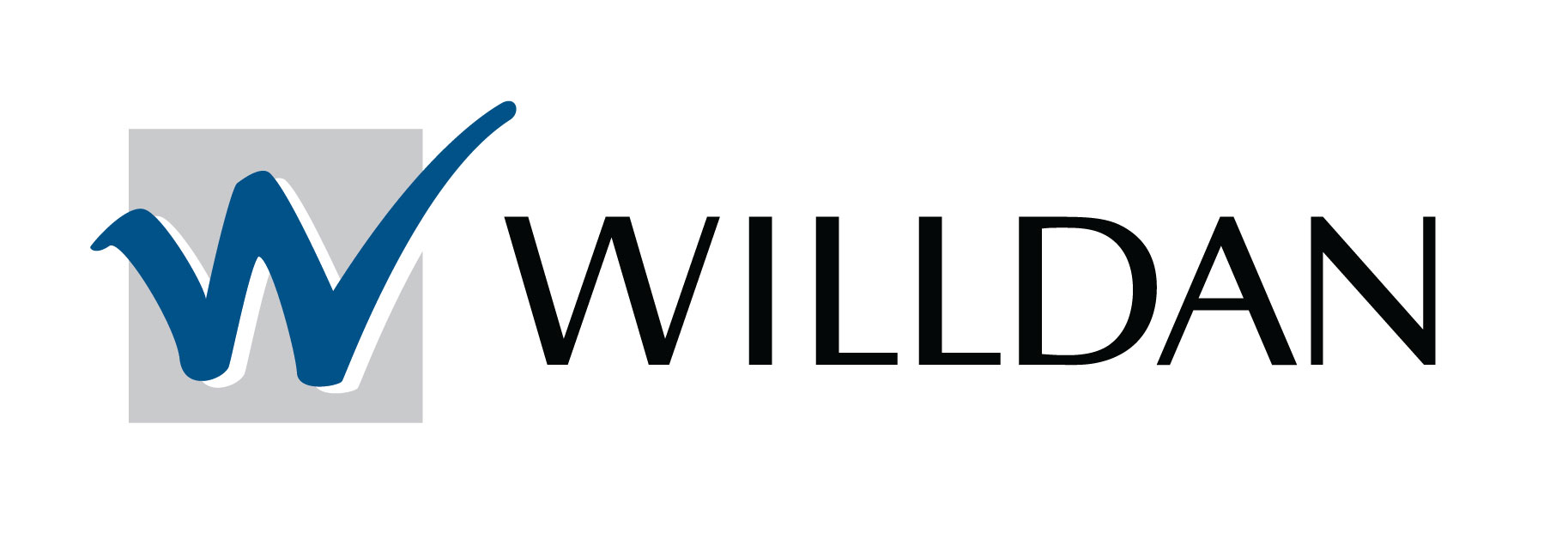
- Type: Public
- Traded as: Nasdaq: WLDN; Russell 2000 Component
- Industry: Business Support Services
- Founded: 1964; 62 years ago
- Headquarters: Anaheim, United States
- Key people: Thomas D. Brisbin; (Chairman); Michael A. Bieber; (CEO); Creighton K. (Kim) Early; (Executive Vice President & CFO); Daniel Chow; (COO)
- Revenue: ▲US$ 272.25 million (2018)
- Operating income: ▲US$ 12.77 million (2018)
- Net income: ▲US$ 10.03 million (2018)
- Total assets: ▲US$ 301.84 million (2018)
- Total equity: ▲US$ 144.29 million (2018)
- Number of employees: 1202 (2018)
- Website: Willdan.com

Willdan Group, Inc. (Willdan) is an American publicly traded company selling professional technical and consulting services to public and private utilities, public agencies at all levels of government, and commercial and industrial firms. The company operates offices in more than a dozen states, with its key operations in California and New York.

== History ==
In 1964, the company was built by William Stookey and Dan Heil in southern California on a then-unique model of providing outsourced engineering services exclusively to municipalities, especially newly urbanizing cities.

Over the next 50 years, the company's expansion has reflected the increasingly complex challenges facing communities, with a focus on energy efficiency, energy engineering, cogeneration, Energy Savings Performance Contract, Community Choice Aggregation, smart city, microgrid consulting, and Transactive energy software.

In 2006, Willdan Group, Inc. completed its initial public offerings in NASDAQ, becoming a publicly traded company under the symbol WLDN.

In 2008, Willdan acquired Intergy Corporation, then renamed Willdan Energy Solutions, offering energy efficiency utility program management.

In 2015, Willdan acquired 360 Energy Engineers and Abacus Resource Management, expanding its capabilities into Energy Service Company and Energy Savings Performance Contract services.

Willdan acquired NYC-based Genesys Engineering, P.C., in 2016, bringing Power Engineering services into its portfolio, with an eye to evolution of U.S. power systems toward Distributed generation and microgrids.

The big data analytics firm Integral Analytics, Inc. (IA) was acquired by Willdan in July 2017. IA's software solutions help investor-owned utility and smart city managers solve problems arising from the transformation of an electrical grid facing growth in distributed generation sources, such as solar power and electric vehicles, effectively harnessing the power of renewable energy and energy storage.

The energy engineering and sustainability firm of Newcomb Anderson McCormick, Inc. was acquired by Willdan in April 2018, bringing strong relationships as a long-term energy efficiency, renewable energy, and green buildings consultant for the University of California, California State University, and California Community Colleges System, and with San Francisco Bay Area public agencies and utilities.

With its November, 2018, acquisition of Lime Energy, Willdan further expanded its presence in the energy market. Lime Energy has delivered energy efficiency programs for 10 of the 25 largest electric utilities and five of the 10 largest municipal utilities in the U.S.

Acquisition of The Weidt Group in March 2019 added energy engineering for new construction and a strong presence in the Upper Midwest. In July 2019, Willdan entered a $200 million expanded credit facility to fund future acquisitions, and also announced its acquisition of Onsite Energy Corporation, adding industrial sector clients for Willdan's energy efficiency services.

In October 2019 Willdan announced the acquisition of Energy and Environmental Economics, Inc (E3), a data-driven energy analysis and strategy consulting firm headquartered in San Francisco, California. E3 has more than 70 employees across offices in San Francisco, Boston, and New York. E3 generated approximately $16 million in revenue in 2018.

Willdan acquired Alternative Power Generation, Inc. (APG), an electrical engineering and construction management firm, in a stock purchase in March, 2025. APG adds significant expertise in data center substation design and construction management, microgrids, EV charging stations, and renewable energy projects for the commercial sector. In 2024, APG generated approximately $37 million in revenue.
