= SMBH, Inc. =

American structural engineering company

- Company type: Private
- Industry: Structural Engineering, Architecture, Construction
- Founded: 1972
- Headquarters: Columbus, Ohio
- Key people: Stephen J. Metz (Principal + President), Jon Beier (Principal + Vice President), Lisa Connelly (Partner + Chief Marketing Officer)
- Services: Commercial, Education, Healthcare, Recreational, Public, Religious, Multifamily, Renovation, BIM, Sustainable Design, Historic Preservation
- Number of employees: 34
- Website: SMBH, Inc.

SMBH, Inc. is a full-service structural engineering firm located in Columbus, Ohio. Providing structural engineering services for architects, contractors and building owners, SMBH, Inc. has experience designing educational facilities, medical centers, courthouses and commercial and residential buildings. Since 1972, SMBH, Inc. has served the architectural and construction communities in Ohio and surrounding states. SMBH, Inc. has worked with architectural firms such as Graham Gund's Gund Partnership, Mack Scogin Merrill Elam Architects, Peter Eisenman, and Robert A.M. Stern.

== History ==
SMBH, Inc. located in Columbus, Ohio, was founded in 1972 as a structural engineering firm for the architectural industry. Founded as Lantz and Jones, the firm changed its name to Lantz Jones and Nebraska, Inc. in 1975 to reflect a change in ownership. Lantz Jones and Nebraska had offices in Charleston, West Virginia and Stuart, Florida. SMBH, Inc. still performs work in these areas, but now operates out of the Columbus, Ohio office. During the past two decades, the ownership has transitioned from Bill Lantz, Tom Jones and Jim Nebraska to Stephen J. Metz, Bob Baumann, and Jon Beier. The ownership transition prompted the name change to Shelley Metz Baumann Hawk, Inc. in 2005 and in 2013, the company name was shortened to SMBH, Inc. In March 2013, Bill Shelley stepped down from his role as president of the company. He was replaced by Stephen Metz.

== Major Projects ==
SMBH, Inc. has worked on the following projects: Franklin County Courthouse, located in Columbus, Ohio, the William Oxley Thompson Memorial Library, located on Ohio State University campus, the Polaris Hilton Conference Center, located in Columbus, Ohio, Limited Brands World Headquarters & Distribution Center, located in Columbus, Ohio, Hocking College Residence Hall, located on the Hocking College campus, the Austin Eldon Knowlton School of Architecture, located on The Ohio State University campus, Grange Insurance Headquarters Expansion Office and Parking Garage, located in downtown Columbus, Ohio, Nationwide Children’s Hospital Research Building 3, located in Columbus, Ohio, Broad Street United Methodist Church, located in Columbus, Ohio, Farmer School of Business, located at Miami University, Ohio School for the Deaf/Ohio State School for the Blind, located in Columbus, Ohio, Linden-McKinley High School, Columbus, Ohio Public Schools, the South High Rise residence halls located on the campus of the Ohio State University, and the Morris Hospital, located in Morris, Illinois.

== Sustainable Design ==
SMBH, Inc. has been involved with sustainable and Leadership in Energy and Environmental Design (LEED) certified projects, as well as team members who are LEED Accredited Professionals.

Examples of green building and sustainable design includes work on the following projects: Student Academic Services Office Building; Columbus, Ohio, Franklin County Courthouse, Columbus, Ohio; West Side Family Health Center, Columbus, Ohio; Grange Insurance Audubon Center, Columbus, Ohio; Columbus State Community College – Academic Center E, Delaware, Ohio; Ohio School for the Blind/Ohio State School for the Deaf, Columbus, Ohio; Mid Ohio Food Bank, Columbus, Ohio; Hocking College – Energy Institute, Logan, Ohio; Miami University – Farmer School of Business Building, Oxford, Ohio.

== Associations ==
SMBH, Inc. are members of the following associations: American Council of Engineering Companies (ACEC), American Institute of Architects (AIA) - Columbus, Ohio, American Institute of Architects (AIA)- West Virginia, American Institute of Steel Construction (AISC), American Concrete Institute (ACI), American Society of Civil Engineers (ASCE), International Concrete Repair Institute (ICRI), National Trust for Historic Preservation, Post-Tensioning Institute (PTI), Structural Engineers Association of Ohio (SEAo0), Tilt-Up Concrete Association (TCA).
