= Clayton Homes =

American manufactured housing company

- Type: Subsidiary
- Industry: Construction; Manufacturing; Financial services
- Founded: 1956; 70 years ago
- Founder: Jim Clayton
- Headquarters: 5000 Clayton Road, Maryville, Tennessee, United States
- Area served: United States
- Key people: Kevin T. Clayton (President & CEO)
- Products: Manufactured homes
- Number of employees: 16000
- Parent: Berkshire Hathaway
- Website: www.claytonhomes.com

Clayton Homes (or Clayton) is the largest builder of manufactured housing and modular homes in the United States. It is a wholly owned subsidiary of Warren Buffett's Berkshire Hathaway.

Clayton Homes' corporate headquarters are in Maryville, Tennessee. Its subsidiaries include Clayton Home Building Group, Clayton Properties Group, Vanderbilt Mortgage, 21st Mortgage, and insurance company HomeFirst Agency.

== History ==
Clayton Homes was founded in 1956 by Jim Clayton. The business began by refurbishing and reselling used mobile homes. In 1966, Jim Clayton opened a Clayton Homes store location in Knoxville, Tennessee, on Clinton Highway. Clayton Homes established its own mortgage company in 1974 and added a manufacturing division in 1975. The company went public in 1983, trading on the New York Stock Exchange. Each year from 1989 through 1992, Clayton Homes was named on the Forbes list of the best small companies in America. Kevin Clayton, Jim Clayton's son, took over the company in 1999. Kevin Clayton had joined Clayton Homes in the 1980s and held several leadership roles in the company and its subsidiaries before becoming CEO.

In 2002, Clayton Homes earned a revenue of $1.2 billion. It was acquired by Berkshire Hathaway in 2003 for $1.7 billion. Cerberus Capital Management also expressed interest in bidding for the company. The certificate of merger was filed in Delaware, and Clayton Homes stock was removed from the New York Stock Exchange. In 2007, Clayton Homes' revenue was $3.66 billion. Clayton Homes sold its land-lease communities business to Denver-based Yes Companies LLC in 2008. The deal involved 65 properties in 11 states. The i-house brand was introduced in May 2008 as a green, energy efficient home. By 2009, Clayton Homes had sold over 1.5 million homes. In 2009, Clayton Homes launched the eHome as a more affordable version of the i-house.

In 2015, Clayton Homes worked with Oak Ridge National Laboratory and the architectural firm Skidmore, Owings & Merrill to produce a 3D printed house and car which share a single energy unit. Clayton Homes expanded into the traditional home building market with the acquisition of Georgia-based homebuilder Chafin Communities in 2015, and Tennessee-based Goodall Homes in 2016. Clayton Homes acquired River Birch Homes, based in Hackleburg, Alabama, in April 2016. The following month, Clayton Homes hosted its first Birmingham-based home show. The show had 492 attendees and featured 27 homes from 27 facilities. That same month, Clayton Homes announced that it would partner with nonprofit Next Step to build a modular duplex in Waco, Texas on a lot owned by NeighborWorks Waco in order to create affordable housing in the Greater Waco area.

In 2016, Clayton Homes was recognized as number 292 on Forbes' list of America's Best Employers. The company introduced a line of tiny homes during fall 2016 with the debut of its "Low Country" prototype in North Carolina. The designer series received media acclaim from USA Today, The Post and Courier, among others.

On July 10, 2017, Clayton Properties Group announced the purchase of home building operator Harris Doyle Homes, which is based in Birmingham, Alabama. Known for its manufactured housing, Clayton Homes is expanding into the site-built, $250,000-and-under housing market, as reported in July 2017. Since October 2015, Clayton Homes has acquired homebuilders in Atlanta, Nashville, Kansas City, Denver, and Birmingham. In 2019, Clayton Homes also worked with Colorado-based advertising agency Made to create the "Prefabulous" series to promote its manufactured housing and attempt to fight the view that off-site built homes are "low-end and one-size-fits-all". As of 2021, Clayton Properties Group, a subsidiary of Clayton Homes, is ranked number eight in size on Builder Magazine’s Top 100 list of home builders in the US with a gross revenue of $2.98 billion.

== Operations ==
Clayton Homes produces homes under the brand names of Buccaneer Homes, Cavalier Homes, Clayton Homes, Crest Homes, Giles Industries, Golden West Homes, Karsten Company, Marlette Homes, Norris Homes, Schult Homes, and Southern Energy Homes. Clayton Homes also owns retail brands Oakwood Homes, TruValue Homes and Luv Homes. In 2016, Clayton acquired G&I Homes, a family-run company based in New York.

As of 2019, Clayton Homes has 40 home building facilities and more than 350 retail outlets located across the United States. At these facilities, retail locations and distribution centers, the company employs 16,000 people. Clayton Homes produces about 50,000 homes per year at its facilities, which is about half of the industry's total. The off-site built home is then transported to its final location in sections to be assembled on a foundation. Clayton Homes has taken a number of sustainability measures at its facilities including preventing 200 short tons (180 tonnes) of waste from going to a landfill from its facility in Bean Station, Tennessee, in 2020 by recycling metal, cardboard, wire, and plastic. The Bean Station facility also saved 40,000 U.S. gallons (150,000 L) of water annually – a 50% reduction – through implementation of water conservation upgrades.

== Controversies and litigation ==
=== FEMA lawsuit ===
Clayton Homes was involved in a lawsuit in 2011 with FEMA after providing portable classrooms as part of Hurricane Katrina relief which were found to contain formaldehyde. Afterwards, one of 12 prefabricated shelters provided to Haiti through the Clinton Foundation after the 2010 earthquake was found to have a formaldehyde level of 250 ppb, "a very high level" according to a scientist specializing in indoor pollutants at Lawrence Berkeley National Laboratory.

=== Alleged predatory sales practices ===
In 2015, The Seattle Times and the Center for Public Integrity published a report alleging that Clayton Homes unfairly targeted and exploited minority home buyers, including "predatory sales practices, exorbitant fees and interest rates that can exceed 15 percent, trapping many buyers in loans they can’t afford and in homes that are almost impossible to sell or refinance." The company was subsequently investigated federally.

Clayton Homes was further criticized for its alleged use of corrupt business practices. The company denied discriminating against its customers or its workers. Warren Buffett, the CEO of Berkshire Hathaway, defended Clayton against predatory lending claims in an interview saying: "We have 300,000 loans on the books and in the last 3 years I've not received one letter of complaint from anybody."

== Philanthropy ==
=== Hope for Warriors ===
In 2015, Clayton Homes released the Patriot home model and partnered with the Hope for the Warriors veterans assistance group. Clayton Home Building Group gave a check for $33,600 to the organization in January. Hope for the Warriors works with veterans from all branches of the military, as well as post 9/11 active duty, National Guard, and reserve service members. In May 2016, Clayton presented a $100,000 check to the organization.

In 2019, Clayton Home Building Group became a founding sponsor of the Warrior's Compass Suite program by Hope for the Warriors to help veterans transition from US military service to civilian employment. Clayton Home Building Group committed to donating $300,000 to support the program.

=== Family Promise ===
Clayton Homes also partners with Family Promise to donate homes to families who have experienced homelessness. In 2021, Clayton Homes donated $450,000 and 3 off-site built homes to be used to prevent family homelessness.
