= Rouse =

Rouse may refer to:

== Places ==
- Rouse, California, United States, a census-designated place
- Rouse, Wisconsin, United States, an unincorporated community
- Rouses Point, New York, United States, a village
- Rouse Islands, Antarctica
- Cape Rouse, Antarctica

== People ==
- Rouse (surname)
- Rouse Simmons (Wisconsin politician) (1832–1897), American politician and businessman

== Other uses ==
- The Rouse, a military bugle call
- The Rouse (Miéville novel), a 2026 novel by China Miéville
- Rouse Baronets, an extinct baronetcy in the Baronetage of England
- Rouse High School, Leander, Texas, United States
- Rouse Ranch, Holt County, Nebraska, United States
- The Rouse Company, an American real estate developer

== See also ==
- Rouse model in polymer physics
- Rouse number, a non-dimensional number in fluid dynamics
- Rouse Rocks (disambiguation)
- Rouses, a supermarket chain in Louisiana and Mississippi
- Rousse, Bulgaria
- Rowse, a surname
- Raus (disambiguation)
