= Prowse =

Prowse may refer to

- Prowse (surname)
- Prowse Point Commonwealth War Graves Commission Cemetery in Belgium
- USS Prowse (PF-92), a United States Navy patrol frigate that was transferred to the United Kingdom while under construction; served in the Royal Navy as HMS Zanzibar (K596) from 1944 to 1946
- Keith Prowse, a British trading company
- 1978 Keith Prowse International, a women's tennis tournament

== See also ==
- Rowse
