= SuperPlus Food Stores =

Defunct American supermarket chain

SuperPlus Food Stores was an American discount supermarket chain that operated in the Chicago area during the 1980s until it was sold, piecemeal, by its parent company, The Great Atlantic & Pacific Tea Company (A&P).
