= Sav-A-Center =

Supermarket chain

Sav-A-Center was a trade name owned by The Great Atlantic & Pacific Tea Company.

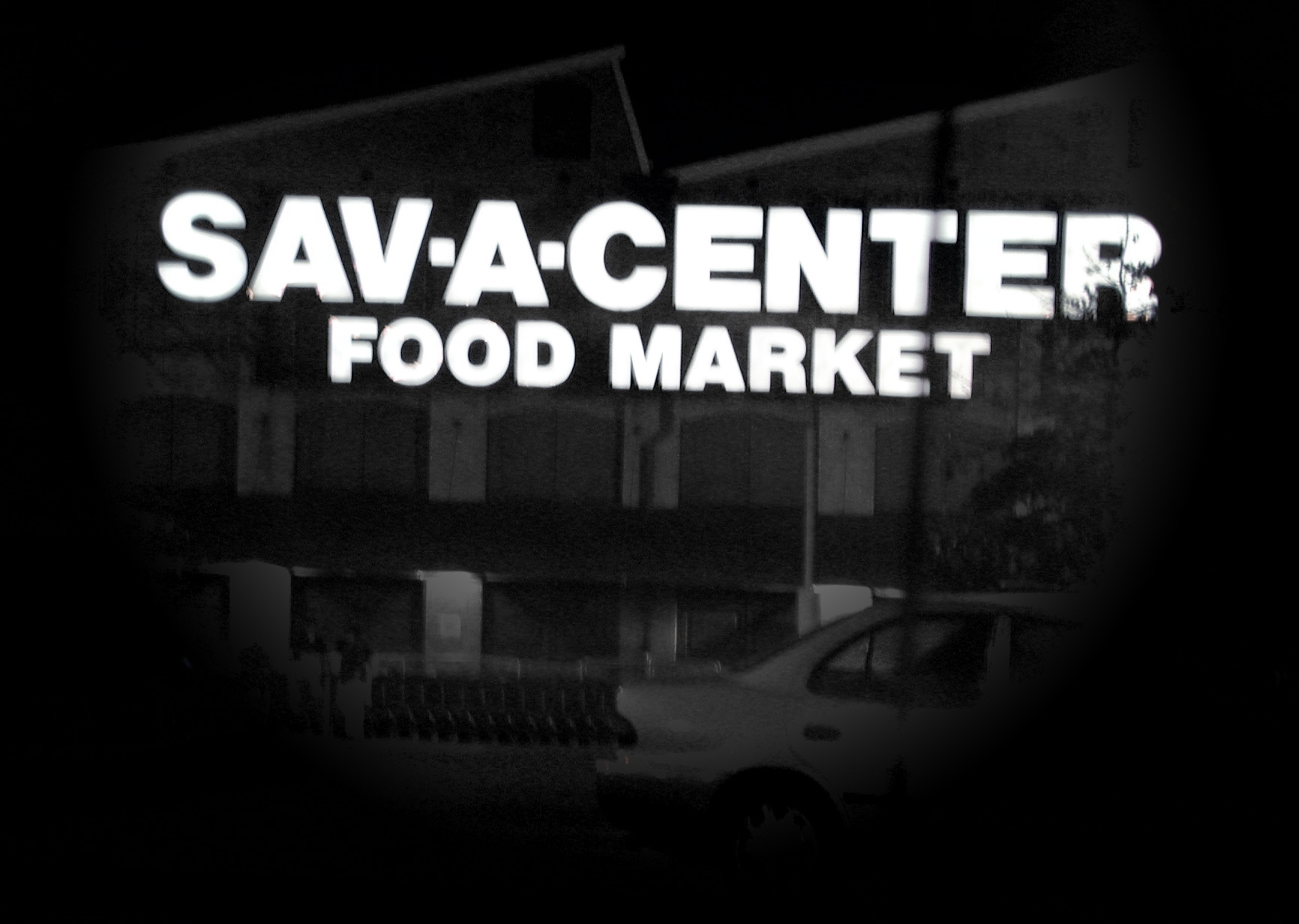
Sav-A-Center in Uptown New Orleans, 2000

== History ==
The Sav-A-Center name was first used for a chain of supermarkets in the greater New Orleans, Louisiana, area starting in the 1980s. The division operated throughout Louisiana, and also had stores in Mississippi. In addition, the Sav-A-Center division included three regular A&P stores, one of which was a small "corner grocery" in the French Quarter of New Orleans that A&P had been operating since 1931.

When Schwegmann filed for bankruptcy in 1999, A&P purchased six stores to add to its Sav-A-Center division. In April 2004, A&P purchased four New Orleans stores from Albertsons with the intention of converting them under the Sav-A-Center banner. By this point, A&P had 28 such stores in the New Orleans area. In May, the company announced a restructuring plan that would limit A&P to the East Coast region, and the Sav-A-Center stores.

In August 2005, many stores sustained damage as a result of Hurricane Katrina. Twenty-one stores reopened within a few months of the storm; two others following remodeling to repair flood damage. Five stores were closed permanently due to severe damage to the stores and surrounding areas. In April 2007, the chain exited the Baton Rouge area.

By May 2007, A&P announced that it was planning to exit the New Orleans area, and was seeking buyers for its 21 remaining Sav-A-Center stores. A&P cited the need to focus on its operations in the Northeast, and its merger with Pathmark, as the reason for the sale.

It was announced in September 2007 that the remaining Sav-A-Center stores would be sold to the locally owned Rouses chain. Rouses took over 16 Sav-A-Center stores, including the Mississippi stores and the French Quarter A&P, sold one to competing chain Breaux Mart, and closed the others.

=== A&P Sav-A-Center ===
Architectural rendering of an A&P Sav-A-Center store

The Sav-A-Center name was also added to many of A&P's Northeastern and mid-South Atlantic stores in the 1980s. In 1981, A&P purchased 17 Stop & Shop locations in New Jersey and rebranded several under the Sav-A-Center branding. After the sale, A&P found itself sharing strip-mall space with many Bradlees stores, which at the time were owned by Stop & Shop. When A&P took over the supermarkets, a common wall was built to separate the businesses. In many areas, including Tidewater region/Hampton Roads, Virginia, in North Carolina, plus most of A&P's Northeastern area, traditional A&P stores were remodeled as Sav-A-Centers; the classic A&P sign's red, orange, and yellow colors became shades of kelly green.

In the Northeast, the former Stop & Shop stores were larger than most of the traditional A&P stores. The company tried to use the Sav-A-Center conversion as a part of its "We've Built a Proud New Feeling" campaign, which was created to shed the company's high-price, stodgy perception. The campaign featured images of larger, cleaner, modern-style stores, happy, upscale-looking shoppers, and friendly, cooperative staff. (It was during this time that A&P debuted its Futurestores.) The Sav-A-Center stores were renovated with oversized graphics of fresh-looking produce and baked goods; they also were outfitted with IBM-POS checkouts. However, A&P had trouble shedding its high-price perception; gradually, the low-volume Sav-A-Centers lost sales and shoppers to stores such as Pathmark and NYC area-leader ShopRite. Some of the stronger Sav-A-Centers survived, but many eventually closed, or were re-branded as A&P Food Market in the 1990s or as Food Basics in the 2000s.

=== Kohl's Sav-A-Center ===
After A&P purchased the Kohl's Food Stores chain, based in Wisconsin, some of those stores were re-branded as Kohl's Sav-A-Center. These stores were later re-branded as Kohl's Food Market or Kohl's Food Emporium before that chain went under.

=== Family Mart Sav-A-Center ===
In the 1980s and 1990s A&P rebranded many locations of its Southern United States The Family Mart chain as Family Mart Sav-A-Center.

=== Dominion Save-A-Centre ===
Beginning in the late 1980s, A&P Canada opened several stores in the Toronto area under the Sav-A-Centre name. Its logo was the same as the American Sav-A-Center, with the exceptions of being red rather than green.

A&P purchased 92 Dominion stores in 1985. By the late 1990s, some stores were rebranded as Dominion Sav-A-Centre. In August 2005, A&P sold its Canada operations to Metro and the stores were all converted by 2009.

=== Pathmark Sav-A-Center ===
In March 2007, A&P purchased Pathmark. A few months later, Rouses Markets bought 19 Sav-A-Center and A&P stores from A&P, including the historic location in New Orleans' French Quarter. In June 2008, Pathmark introduced a "price impact" store concept, under the Pathmark Sav-A-Center brand. This format was introduced to remodeled stores in Irvington and South Edison, New Jersey.

After the success of these stores, A&P announced it would rebrand 16 Pathmark Super Centers, and eight of the 13 Philadelphia-area A&P Super Fresh stores as Pathmark Sav-A-Center stores. In addition, A&P's website later rebranded Pathmark as Pathmark Sav-A-Center.

== See also ==
- List of Canadian supermarkets
