= SuperFresh =

Supermarket brand

- Type: Subsidiary
- Industry: Supermarket
- Founded: 1982
- Headquarters: Staten Island, New York, U.S.
- Number of locations: 20
- Area served: New Jersey, New York
- Parent: Key Food
- Website: superfreshmarket.com

SuperFresh is a supermarket brand owned by Key Food Stores which operates in New York City and its New Jersey suburbs. The company currently operates twenty supermarkets.

The name previously belonged to a chain of stores run by A&P, based largely in the cities and suburbs of Philadelphia, Baton Rouge, Baltimore, and Washington DC.

== History ==
=== A&P ownership (1982–2015) ===
A&P and its unionized employees created the supermarket brand in 1982 and converted its Mid-Atlantic region stores to the new name. Employees were offered profit-sharing benefits and given more control over individual stores, allowing the local market to more directly affect a store's offerings.

By 1986, SuperFresh stores were located in the Philadelphia area, Delaware, Maryland, southern New Jersey, Washington, D.C., and northern Virginia. SuperFresh stores also operated in Baton Rouge, Louisiana, until 2003, when they were rebranded to A&P's Sav-A-Center banner. In December 1994, A&P Canada converted five locations to low-cost versions of the SuperFresh concept. Another 20 stores were converted in February 1995.

In 2006, A&P acquired six Clemens Family Markets, which were located in Montgomery and Bucks counties in suburban Philadelphia, converting them to the SuperFresh banner.

In 2007, A&P acquired the Pathmark supermarket chain. By June 2008, it announced plans to convert eight of the 13 Philadelphia-area SuperFresh stores to its new Pathmark Sav-A-Center banner. The company planned to renovate the remaining SuperFresh stores into its successful "Fresh" format (used in its A&P Fresh Markets). The change would re-position the Superfresh brand as an upscale banner.

Following its Chapter 11 bankruptcy reorganization, A&P announced in early 2011 its intention to sell or close 32 stores across its six supermarket banners. Included in the group were eight SuperFresh stores and one former SuperFresh store in Glasgow, Delaware, which had just been converted to the Pathmark Sav-A-Center brand two years prior.

On April 13, 2011, A&P announced plans to close or sell 25 additional SuperFresh stores: 22 in Maryland, two in Delaware (Dover and Milford), and the only store in Washington, D.C. After holding an auction in May, 13 stores were shut down because no buyer was found. These supermarkets closed by July 15 and were replaced by Shoppers Food & Pharmacy, ShopRite, and Fresh & Green's.

On November 14, 2012, A&P announced the closure of three New Jersey SuperFresh locations in Marlton, Westmont, and Plainsboro. These stores were liquidated in January 2013, leaving Manahawkin, Ocean City, and Wildwood as the only remaining stores in New Jersey.

On July 20, 2015, A&P announced that it was filing for bankruptcy for a second time. Acme Markets acquired 75 A&P, SuperFresh, and Pathmark stores across Connecticut, Delaware, Maryland, New Jersey, New York, and Pennsylvania. The company liquidated in late 2015, selling as many stores as possible to competitors, and closing the remainder. During this process, all Superfresh stores were either closed or re-bannered as Acme or ShopRite.

=== Key Food ownership (2016–present) ===
In February 2016, Key Food Stores acquired the trademark and rights to the SuperFresh brand name during the A&P bankruptcy auction. On March 11, 2016, Key Food relaunched the SuperFresh brand from their location in Paterson, New Jersey. By June, the company had a store in Bloomfield and on Staten Island.

All Key Food locations in the state were rebranded under the SuperFresh banner in 2017. In July 2021, a SuperFresh opened in North Baldwin on Long Island, replacing the Pathmark that had closed in 2015.

In 2025, the first location was opened in Florida in Miami Gardens just one mile from Hard Rock Stadium.

== Slogans ==
The 1994–2004 Super Fresh logo

- Doing More for You
- The great store...just next door!
- We Built A Proud New Feeling (mid-to-late 1980s; also used by parent chain A&P during this time)
- We're Fresh... We're Super Fresh
- We're Fresh Obsessed
- I Love This Store! (2002–2010)
- You want lower prices, we hear you. (2010–2011)
- Better Store, Better Living. (2011–present)
- The Savings Never Stop. Every Aisle, Every Item, Every Day. (2016–present)
