= Key Food =

Grocery store chain in the United States

Key Food Stores

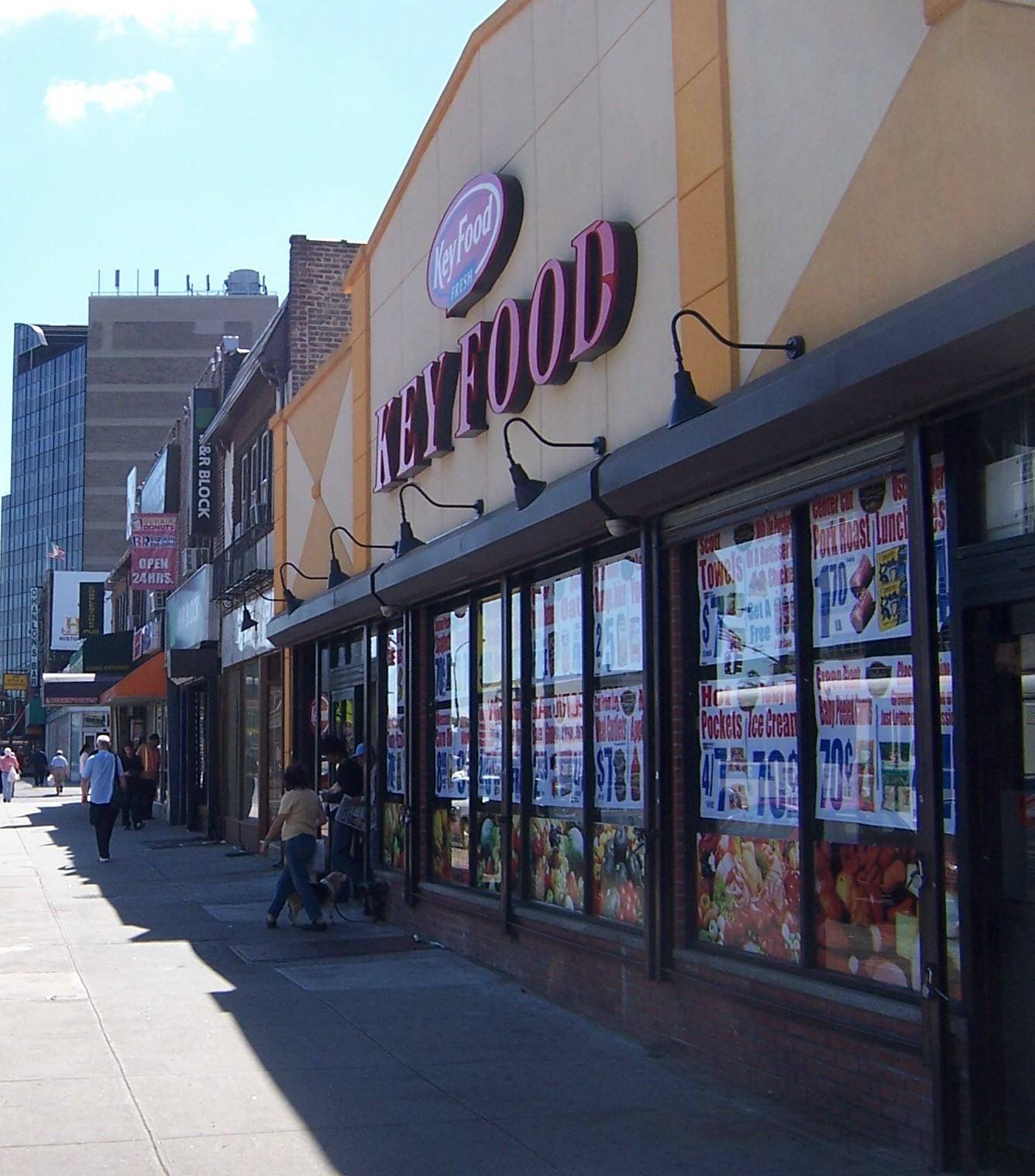
- Type: Retailers' cooperative; Private
- Industry: Retail (Supermarket)
- Founded: 1946 (80 years ago) in Brooklyn, New York, U.S.
- Headquarters: Matawan, New Jersey, U.S.
- Number of locations: 324
- Area served: Connecticut, Delaware, Florida, Maryland, Massachusetts, New Jersey, New York, Pennsylvania, Rhode Island
- Key people: Dean Janeway (CEO)
- Products: Bakery, grocery, delicatessen, health and beauty, frozen foods, produce, seafood, meats, dairy, general merchandise, floral, alcoholic beverages, snacks, pet supplies
- Services: Grocery; Pharmacy; Online shopping and home delivery
- Members: 76
- Subsidiaries: Food Emporium; Super Fresh
- Website: keyfood.com

Key Food Stores Co-op, Inc. is a cooperative of independently owned supermarkets, founded in Brooklyn, New York, on April 20, 1937. Its stores are located in Connecticut, Maryland, Delaware, Massachusetts, Rhode Island, New Jersey, New York, Pennsylvania, and Florida. The headquarters for the Key Food cooperative is in Matawan, New Jersey.

The cooperative also operates stores under the Key Food Marketplace, Key Fresh & Natural, Food Dynasty, Urban Market, Food World, Food Universe Marketplace, SuperFresh, and The Food Emporium banners.

== History ==
During the 1970s and '80s, Key Food was connected to a trucking firm that committed $10 million worth of tax fraud.

In 1984, LAMM Food Corporation of Port Washington, New York – an affiliate that operated four Key Food stores at the time – was among three chains charged with price fixing for conspiring to stop redeeming discount coupons at double and triple their face value in 1981 and 1982. LAMM, Supermarkets General, and King Kullen each pleaded no contest.

On November 30, 1986, Key Foods president Camillo D'Urso went missing while fishing in Key Largo. He was never found and was presumed to have drowned. In February 1987, Pasquale Conte, owner of the affiliated Tapps Supermarkets and a director of the cooperative, was arrested for his involvement in the attempted murder of a defendant in the Pizza Connection trial. Long suspected of mob ties, Conte was involved in a heroin smuggling operation with the Sicilian Mafia. Though the disappearance of D'Urso was believed to be unrelated to the hit, the FBI did investigate a connection. In an unrelated case, Conte later pleaded guilty in 1994 to a 1990 mob-related murder and was sentenced to seven and a half years in prison.

In January 1997, nearly 100 workers were laid off from the co-op's warehouse in Canarsie when distribution operations were moved to New Jersey. Another 200 jobs were saved after a union agreement kept the Brooklyn facility open.

Key Food first experimented with home delivery in 1998, when two stores owned by Gemstone Supermarkets partnered with Homedelivery.com. In July 2000, Key Food began outsourcing its distribution and transportation operations to Grocery Haulers, Inc. As part of the deal, the company sold its fixed assets, including two New York-based warehouses and inventory to GHI. In November 2008, the cooperative names Dean Janeway as chief executive officer.

In 2011, Key Food expanded to Connecticut and New Jersey, with stores in Stamford and Jersey City. It also launched a new banner, Fresh n’ Save Marketplace, with two locations in Staten Island and Queens. In August 2012, the co-op reopened its South Street Seaport location as 55 Fulton Market, a 23,000 square feet, two-floor flagship store.

The cooperative took over two Queens CTown locations in January 2013, converting them to Key Food stores. In June 2013, Key Food opened several new locations in New York City within a two-week period. These included two in Queens, four in Brooklyn, and another in Staten Island. In December 2013, Key Food debuted its upscale Urban Market concept in Williamsburg, Brooklyn. A second location opened in Long Island City a year later. In May 2014, the second Key Food location in New Jersey opened in Manalapan. Toward the end of 2014, the cooperative introduced the Food Universe banner with seven stores in New York City. In December, it opened the Olive Tree Marketplace in Staten Island.

In November 2015, Key Food completed the purchase of 23 stores from the bankrupt A&P, increasing its total number of stores to 212. The stores included three Pathmark, three A&P, 10 Waldbaum's, four Food Emporium, and three Food Basics USA locations in New York and New Jersey. Two of the stores opened as Food Universe locations under corporate operation, rather than cooperative ownership, for the first time in company history. The acquisition made it the largest grocer in New York City.

In July 2015, the cooperative debuted its Windsor Farms banner, opening a store in Brooklyn's Windsor Terrace neighborhood. In December 2015, Key Food acquired the Food Emporium banner name and related intellectual property assets from A&P. The company also acquired the SuperFresh name and assets in February 2016. By October, another 10 former A&P locations had joined the cooperative. In total, it took control of 11% of A&P's 297 stores at the time of its bankruptcy. By June 2016, Key Food had rebranded three stores under the SuperFresh name. In October, the co-op introduced its Urban Meadow private label. At the end of the 2016 fiscal year, Key Food had gained 42 stores from Associated Stores Group over the previous 30 months. In January 2019, Key Food opened its first location in Florida.

When Fairway Market filed for bankruptcy in January 2020, Key Food purchased its Georgetown, Brooklyn store. In October 2020, the cooperative signed a 10-year contract with UNFI for the wholesaler to serve as the primary supplier for its 315 stores. In late 2020, the co-op moved its corporate headquarters from Staten Island to Matawan, New Jersey. By January 2023, Key Food had 62 locations in Florida and four stores in Pennsylvania. In 2025 the contract between UNFI and Key Foods was cancelled by mutual agreement with UNFI indicating that the contract was not profitable. UNFI intends to close its distribution center in Schnecksville, Pennsylvania, in September 2025 laying off over 700 employees.
