= Kohl's =

American department store chain

Kohl's Corporation

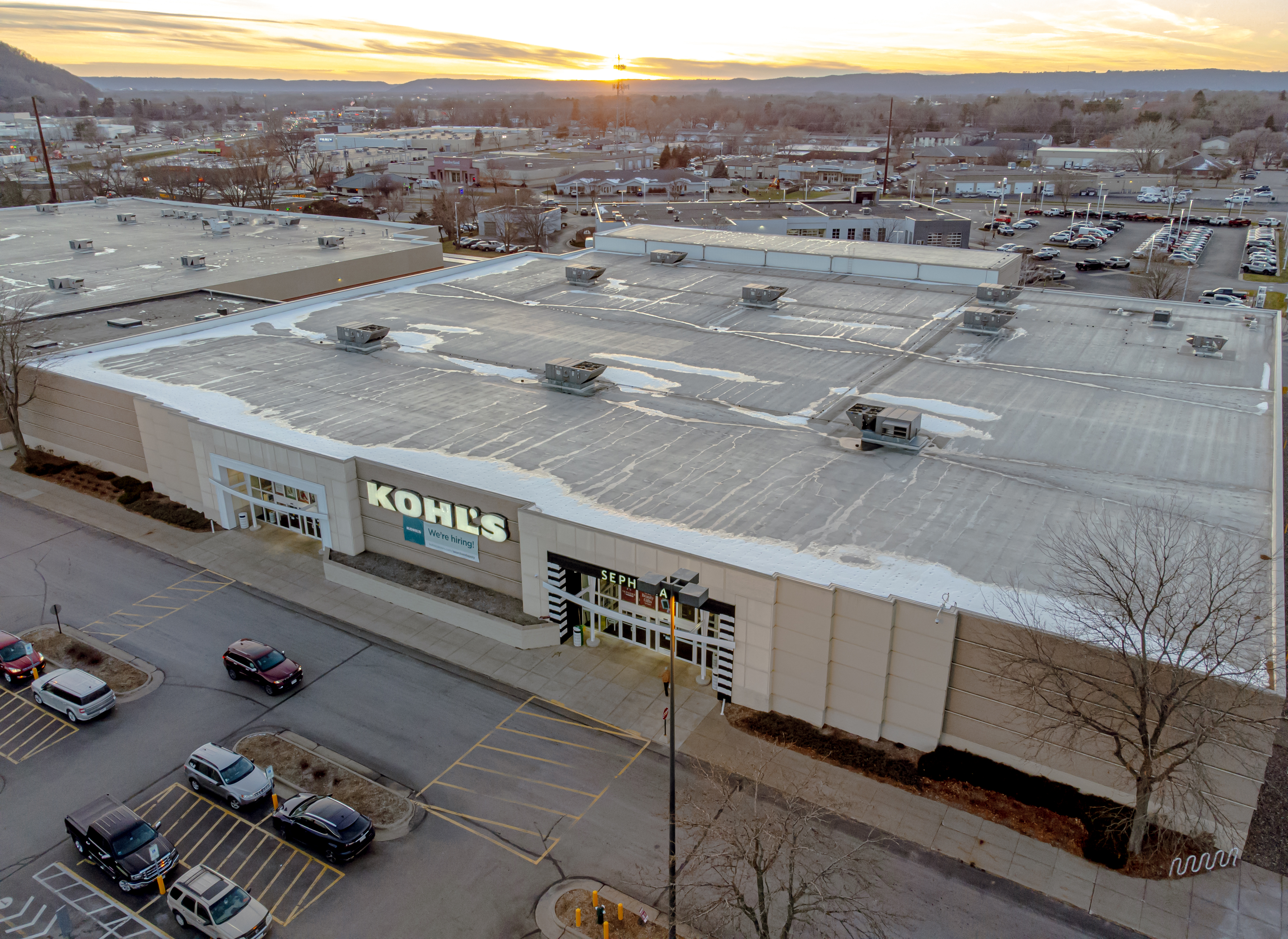
- Kohl's store in Onalaska, Wisconsin
- Type: Public
- Traded as: NYSE: KSS; S&P 600 component
- Industry: Retail
- Founded: September 12, 1962 (64 years ago), in Brookfield, Wisconsin, U.S.
- Founder: Maxwell Kohl
- Headquarters: Menomonee Falls, Wisconsin, U.S.
- Number of locations: 1,174 (February 2024)
- Key people: Michael Bender (Chairman and CEO)
- Products: Clothing, footwear, jewelry, accessories, beauty products, furniture, decor, bedding, bath, toys, books, appliances, electronics, pet products, housewares
- Website: kohls.com

Kohl's Corporation (KOHL'S is stylized in all caps) is an American department store retail chain. It has 1,174 locations as of February 2024, operating stores in every U.S. state except Hawaii. The company was founded by Polish immigrant Maxwell Kohl, who opened a corner grocery store in Milwaukee, Wisconsin, in 1927. It went on to become a successful chain (Kohl's Food Stores) in the local area, and in 1962 the company branched out by opening its first department store. British American Tobacco (BAT) took a controlling interest in the company in 1972 while still managed by the Kohl family, and in 1979, the corporation was sold to BATUS Inc. A group of investors purchased the company in 1986 from BATUS and took it public in 1992.

Kohl's is headquartered in the Milwaukee suburb of Menomonee Falls, Wisconsin. It became the largest department store chain in the United States in May 2012, surpassing its competitor JCPenney. The company is listed on both the S&P 400 and the Fortune 500. In terms of revenue, the chain was the 23rd-largest retailer in the United States in 2019.

== History ==
=== Founding ===
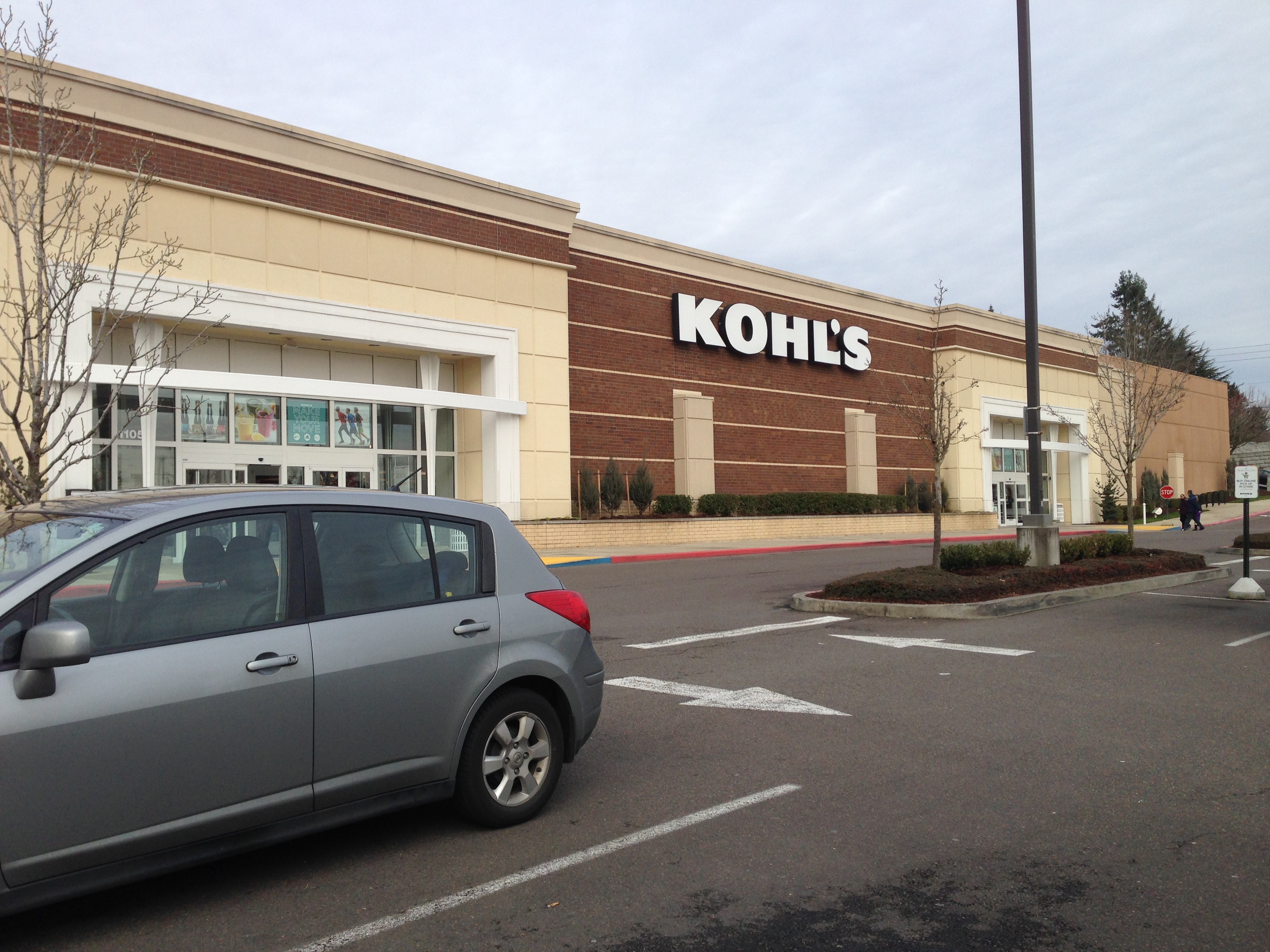
The exterior of a typical Kohl's department store in Beaverton, Oregon.

Maxwell Kohl, who had operated traditional grocery stores since 1927, built his first supermarket in 1946, the first in what would become a southeastern Wisconsin chain known as Kohl's Food Stores. In September 1962, after building Kohl's Food Stores into the largest supermarket chain in the Milwaukee area, Kohl opened his first department store in Brookfield, Wisconsin. He positioned Kohl's between the higher-end department stores and the discounters, selling everything from candy to engine oil to sporting equipment.

=== BATUS ownership ===
In 1972, the British American Tobacco Company's U.S. retail division, Batus Inc., bought a controlling interest in Kohl's Corporation, which at the time operated 50 grocery stores, six department stores, three drug stores, and three liquor stores. The Kohl family, led by Allen Kohl and Herb Kohl, continued to manage the company. Herb Kohl left the management in 1979, eventually becoming a United States senator and owner of the Milwaukee Bucks. The firm then expanded Kohl's presence from 10 to 39 stores in Wisconsin, Illinois and Indiana. The grocery stores were sold to A&P in 1983, operating under the name Kohl's Food Store, and later Kohl's Food Emporium. In February 2003, A&P put the Kohl's Food Stores up for sale, as part of an effort to reduce debt. That same year, A&P closed all Kohl's Food Stores locations and the Kohl family left remaining management.

=== Public listing ===
A group of investors, led by the senior management, purchased the company in 1986. Building on the existing 40 department stores, the company added 27 more stores over the next two years. In 1988, the chain acquired 26 locations from the Chicago-based retailer MainStreet, gaining several stores in Chicago's suburbs, the Twin Cities, and Michigan. Kohl's completed its initial public offering on May 19, 1992, and began trading on the New York Stock Exchange under the symbol KSS.

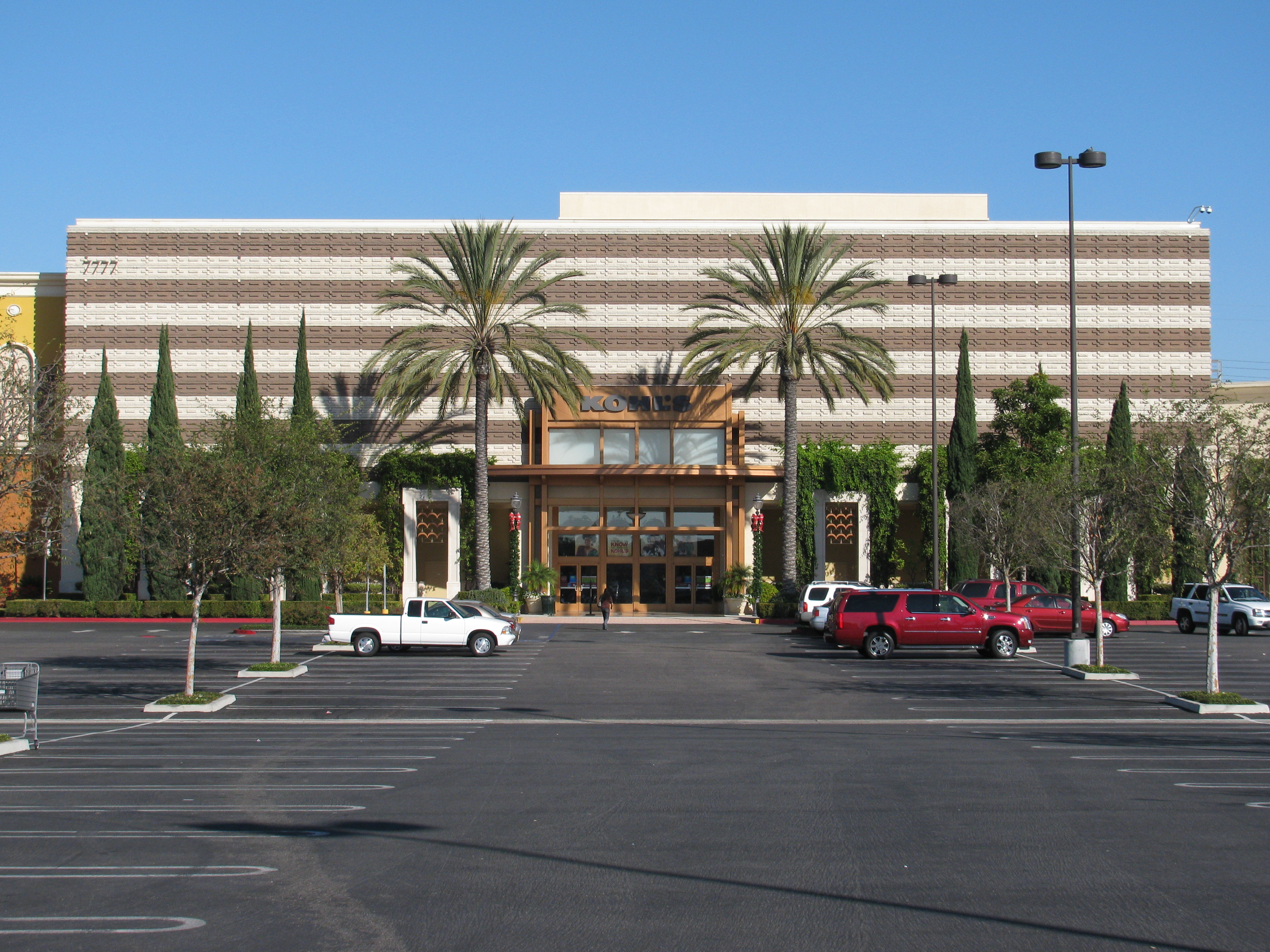
Kohl's in Huntington Beach, California (formerly The Broadway)

During the 2000s, Kohl's expanded nationwide to 49 states. Building from 76 stores in the Midwest in 1992, Kohl's expanded into the New York metropolitan area in 2000 after Caldor was liquidated. The chain later expanded into the Dallas-Fort Worth metroplex and California in 2003 with 28 new stores, the Pacific Northwest in 2006 with 10 new stores, and the Southeast with 43 new stores opening between 2005 and 2008. To raise money to repurchase its stock and open new stores, Kohl's sold its credit card division in 2006 to J.P. Morgan Chase for $1.5 billion.

=== 2010s ===
In 2011, Kohl's replaced Chase with Capital One as their private credit card processing partner for an undisclosed sum. In 2016, Kohl's added the Capital One backed private label Kohl's Card to the Kohl's App to create Kohl's Pay - the first integrated mobile checkout solution for a retailer in US, combining Kohl's Card, Kohl's Cash, Kohl's Yes-2-You Rewards and Kohl's coupons into a single QR Code Payment, with technology powered by Omnyway, Inc (né OmnyPay), a Silicon Valley startup. That same year, Kohl's became the first retailer to include Kohl's Card and Kohl's Rewards in one tap payments with Apple Pay.

Kohl's hired New York City advertising agency DeVito/Verdi in 2009 to strengthen the Kohl's brand via a series of national television, online, and social media campaigns. The same year, Newsweek magazine ranked the company 18th overall and first in its industry in its "Green Rankings", an examination of 500 of the largest corporations on their environmental track records. Newsweek remarked that Kohl's had the largest solar power program of any retailer globally, it pursues green building certification, and over 78 locations in six states have solar panels. Kohl's had also begun to sell reusable shopping bags the previous year.

Kohl's was awarded $62.5 million in tax credits from the Wisconsin Economic Development Corporation in 2012. The retailer was to create 3,000 jobs with the funds, but only created 473. In the same year, Kohl's requested financing from the village of Menomonee Falls, Wisconsin, to fund the construction of its new headquarters there. Kohl's received $2 million, the first of five installments that was to equal a total payout of $12 million, but ultimately backed out of the transaction.

In 2015, the company opened the first test store of Off/Aisle, a chain built around selling like-new clothing, home goods, jewelry, and accessories that were purchased and returned at Kohl's stores. The stores sold items at discounted prices, and had a more restrictive return policy than typical Kohl's stores. The Off/Aisle stores were ultimately closed in 2019.

=== Stock decline ===
In early January 2017, Kohl's shares fell 19% in value, in what The Wall Street Journal said was "the stock's worst day on record," and noted that it was a noticeable exception to the overall declining volatility of the market. The company ranked 157th on the 2018 Fortune 500, the annual list of the largest United States corporations, having earned revenues of $19.095 billion in 2017. In that year, Kohl's entered into a partnership with Amazon, which included a program where select stores would accept Amazon returns; in 2019 it was expanded nationwide. In 2018, Kohl's announced a pilot program to lease space to grocer Aldi and, the following year, to fitness center Planet Fitness, alongside up to 10 stores each.

Kohl's began a pilot program accepting Amazon returns in 2017 at stores in the Chicago, Los Angeles, and Milwaukee areas; in 2019, the company opened Amazon "Return Drops" at all of its stores, after seeing a corresponding increase in foot traffic and sales. By 2024, some investors questioned whether the program was actually profitable due to the required in-store workers.

=== Recent history ===
On March 16, 2022, it was announced that Hudson's Bay Company and Sycamore Partners were considering bids to buy Kohl's, after which its shares jumped 17%. On April 25, 2022, it was announced that Simon Property Group and Brookfield Asset Management, the owners of JCPenney, had set an offer to buy Kohl's. In June 2022, the Franchise Group considered making a bid for the ownership of Kohl's which might result in the sale of the real estate that Kohl's owns to fund the acquisition by the Franchise Group. Kohl's ultimately withdrew from the deal after Franchise Group lowered their bid for the company after finding out that Kohl's had downgraded its outlook for the second fiscal quarter for the company as a result of "softer consumer spending amid decades-high inflation".

Despite declining sales of furniture and home goods (the 6.3% decline in February 2024 was the 12th consecutive quarter of decline), Kohl's planned to enlarge its home assortment by 40% in March 2024. In 2024, Kohl's struck a deal with Babies R Us to add baby supplies and furniture, and products from Graco, Carter's, Fisher-Price and other brands. Tom Kingsbury was CEO from 2022 to early 2025, replacing Michelle Gass. As of November 2025, Michael Bender is chairman and CEO of Kohl's. Bender became interim CEO in May following the firing of Ashley Buchanan, who was CEO for less than five months before being dismissed for unethical conduct.

== Brands and store layout ==
Kohl's uses a "racetrack" layout with a single aisle that circles the entire store, a layout borrowed from discount stores.

Kohl's store brands include diffusion lines from high-end designers such as Dana Buchman, Vera Wang, Narciso Rodriguez, and Peter Som. Celebrities such as Avril Lavigne, Lauren Conrad, Daisy Fuentes, Paula DeAnda, Jennifer Lopez, Britney Spears, Marc Anthony, and Tony Hawk have sold branded clothing exclusively through Kohl's.

Kohl's private label brands generate nearly half of the firm's $19 billion in annual sales. These include in-house clothing brands such as American Beauty, Apt. 9, Croft & Barrow, Jumping Beans, So, Tek Gear, and Urban Pipeline. The Sonoma Goods for Life brand of apparel and home goods alone is worth over a billion dollars, and Kohl's announced relaunch plans for the brand in 2016. Kohl's has also purchased the exclusive retail rights to existing brands such as Candie's and Mudd Jeans, and it inked a deal in 2018 with Authentic Brands Group to license the Nine West brand as a "By Kohl's" line.

In 2021, Kohl's made a deal with makeup retailer Sephora to have certain Kohl's locations have Sephora stores inside of the stores. This was a move to replace their in-house beauty selection. The next year, Sephora at Kohl's (S@K) expanded to all Kohl's locations. In 2024, Haus Labs by Lady Gaga announced that they had joined the Sephora at Kohl's assortment.

=== List of brands ===
The store's private label offerings are referred to as "By Kohl's" brands.

- American Beauty
- Apt. 9 (apparel)
- The Big One (home)
- Croft & Barrow (women's; purchased from JCPenney in 2001)
- Draper James
- FLX (activewear)
- Hotelier (home)
- Jumping Beans (children's)
- LC Lauren Conrad (women's)
- Little Co. by Lauren Conrad (children's)
- Mingle & Co. (home)
- Miryana (home)
- Sea and Skye (juniors)
- Simply Vera Vera Wang (or SVVW; women's; diffusion line)
- SO (juniors)
- Sonoma Goods for Life (or Sonoma; home and apparel)
- St. Nicholas Square (holiday)
- Tek Gear (activewear)
- Urban Pipeline
