= Rowse =

Rowse is a surname, derived from the name of an ancestor, 'the son of Rose' and may refer to

- A. L. Rowse, British historian
- Anne Rowse, retired New Zealand dancer
- Herbert James Rowse, British architect
- Michael Rowse, naturalised Chinese civil servant in Hong Kong
- Samuel W. Rowse, American artist
- Tony Rowse, founder of Rowse Honey in 1938

== See also ==
- Prowse (disambiguation)
- Rouse (disambiguation)
