= Rouse Rocks =

Rouse Rocks may refer to:

- Rouse Islands, a small group of islands in the eastern part of Holme Bay in Antarctica
- Rouse Rocks, an alternate name for John T. Young's sculpture Soaring Stones
