= Food Basics (American supermarket) =

American discount supermarket

- Food Basics logo, circa 2012

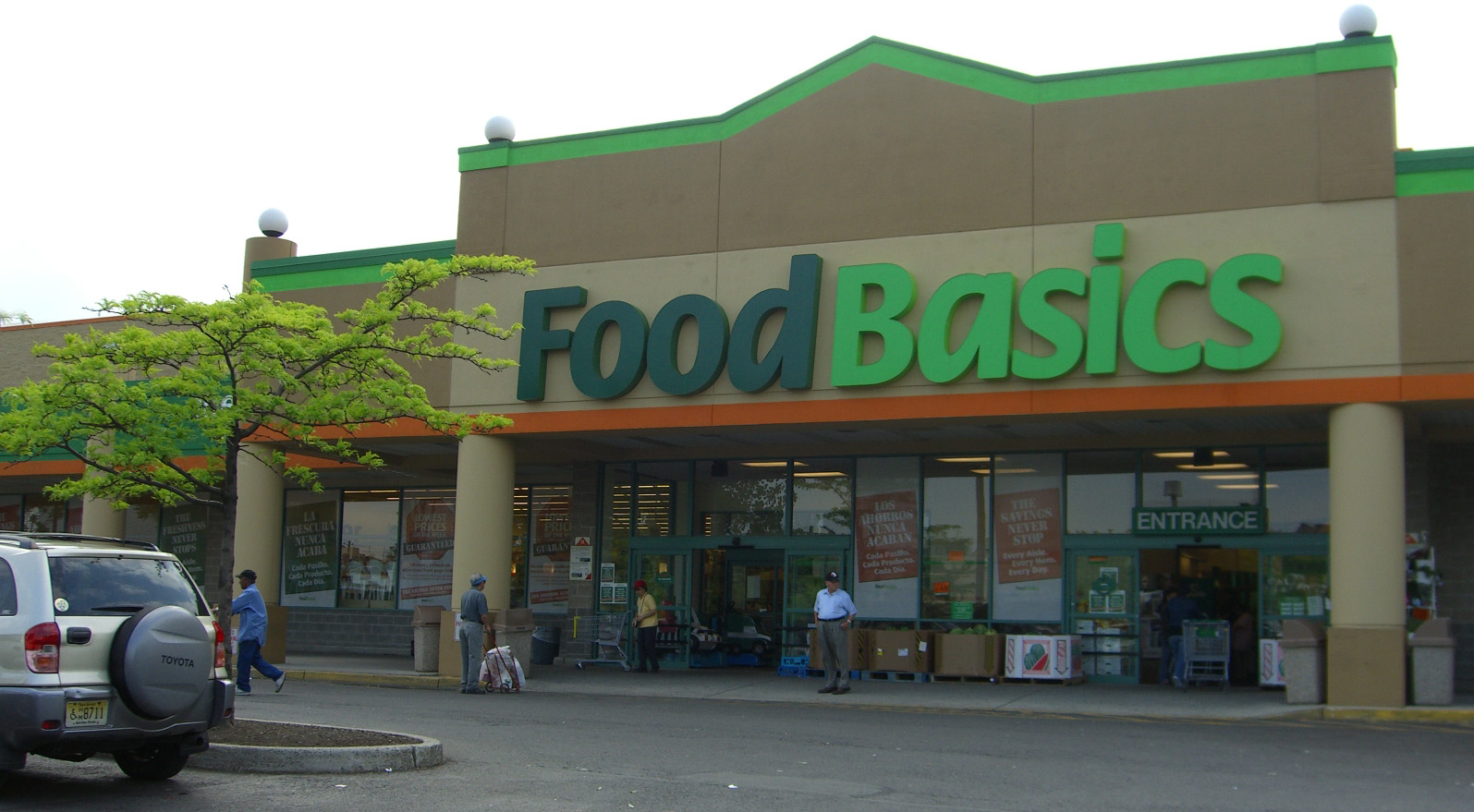
- The Food Basics in North Bergen, New Jersey in 2007
- Industry: Retail; Grocery
- Founded: Toronto, Ontario, Canada (1995 - Canadian concept); Passaic, New Jersey, United States (2001 - US concept)
- Defunct: 2015
- Headquarters: Montvale, New Jersey, United States
- Area served: Northeastern United States
- Parent: The Great Atlantic & Pacific Tea Company

Food Basics was a no-frills discount supermarket chain owned and operated by The Great Atlantic & Pacific Tea Company in the northeastern United States.

Food Basics carried major national brands, as well as A&P's portfolio of private labels, including America's Choice, A&P's flagship private label, Food Basics and Home Basics, Live Better, and Green Way. The stores also included brands usually not carried by other A&P family stores.

Food Basics, like the rest of A&P’s operations, was liquidated and closed in 2015. The name and trademark was purchased by Allegiance Retail Services, which also purchased the name and trademark for Food Basics’ former corporate sibling Pathmark.

== History ==
The Food Basics concept began in 1995 in Canada, where it was launched by A&P's Canadian subsidiary. As of 2009, the two chains were no longer connected as the Canadian Food Basics stores are now owned and operated by Metro Inc., which purchased A&P's Canadian stores.

In 2001, A&P brought the Food Basics concept to the U.S., reopening its closed A&P supermarket in Passaic, New Jersey, as its first Food Basics in the US. A&P was pleased with the results and within several months of opening the Passaic store, A&P decided to expand the Food Basics banner into nearby Paterson, and renovated an A&P store there.

Some of the new Food Basics stores had been part of the A&P family for decades, including the Paterson store mentioned above, with A&P's former Atlantic Regional headquarters nearby; in fact, before a separate building was constructed in the 1970s, A&P operated its store inside the headquarters building.

Other Food Basics stores, such as the Wallington, New Jersey, Food Basics store, became part of A&P when the chain purchased Stop & Shop's New York Metro division in 1982.

From its beginning, American Food Basics stores followed the same business plan as the Canadian stores: no in-store bakery or deli, some locations had no in-store butcher, and customers were not given free plastic bags. In the latter case, customers were encouraged to bring their own bags, with a small discount for each bag used, or use cardboard boxes provided for free. A sturdier plastic bag than a typical supermarket shopping bag was available to customers for a small fee. In the US, this was not a popular policy. Food Basics eventually stopped charging for shopping bags and started using cheap plastic bags used by its competitors and its fellow A&P banner stores.

In its early years, all of Food Basics' stores in the United States had been small former A&Ps. In the mid-2000s, A&P expanded the Food Basics concept to larger stores, including a former A&P Food Market in North Bergen, New Jersey, a former Super Fresh Super Store in Northeast Philadelphia, a Pathmark Super Center in the Eastside section of Paterson (the city's second Food Basics store), and an A&P Super Food Mart in Bridgeport, CT.

In nearly all cases, the converted Food Basics stores were able to retain elements of the A&Ps they took over. The North Bergen and Paterson Eastside stores kept the pharmacy departments that their old stores had and were the only Food Basics to offer pharmacies. Five Food Basics kept the old stores' liquor licenses, with a sixth store selling only beer.

In 2006, A&P made changes to the Food Basics model, opening a prototype store in Glassboro, New Jersey. The newer format emphasized low pricing (or "best pricing"), fresh produce, cut meats, and a bakery. New signage, colors, and wide aisles were among the changes in the Glassboro store.

In 2014, A&P operated 10 Food Basics stores: seven in New Jersey, two in Philadelphia, and one in Brooklyn.

When A&P opted for liquidation in 2015, nine of the ten remaining Food Basics locations were sold to other operators. Key Food purchased several of these stores and rebranded the Paterson and Glen Rock, New Jersey stores under the Super Fresh banner, which was the name of A&P’s Philadelphia-area chain and which Key Food acquired in the bankruptcy auction for the company’s intellectual properties. The Passaic and Eastside Paterson stores were rebranded Gala Fresh, another Key Food brand concept, but neither store operates under this brand; the Eastside Paterson store rebranded as another Key Food marque, Food Universe, while the Passaic store was closed and subdivided; half of the store is now occupied by Dollar Tree and the other is home to that store’s sibling chain of variety stores, Family Dollar.
