= A&P =

American grocery store chain

The Great Atlantic & Pacific Tea Company
- A&P logo, 2006–2009

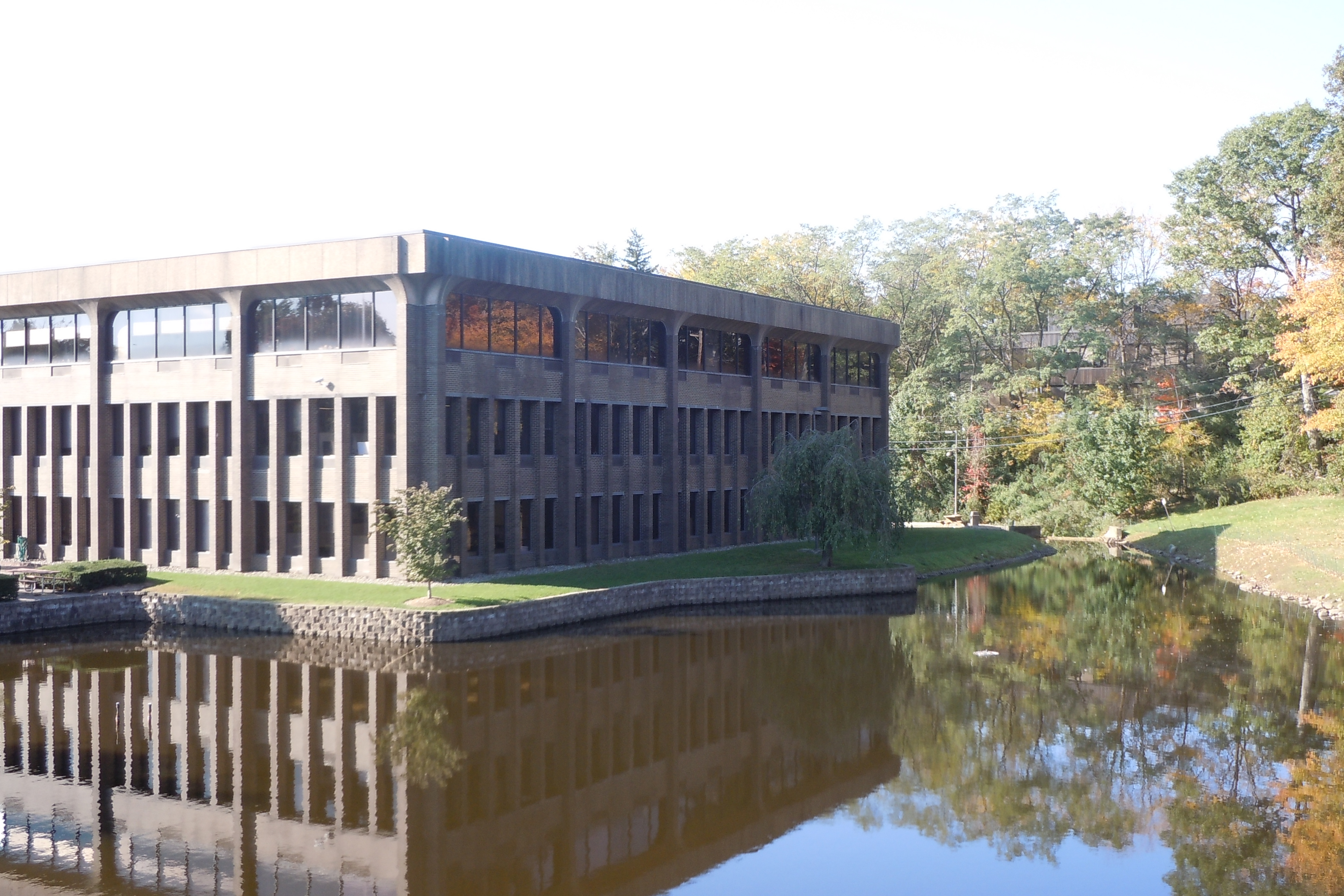
- A&P's final headquarters, since demolished and replaced with townhomes, in Montvale, New Jersey
- Trade name: A&P
- Formerly: Gilman & Company (1859–1869)
- Type: Public
- Industry: Grocery
- Founded: February 17, 1859; 167 years ago in New York City, New York, United States
- Founders: George Gilman; George Huntington Hartford
- Defunct: November 2015; 10 years ago
- Fate: Chapter 11 bankruptcy and Liquidation
- Successor: apcoffeetea.com
- Headquarters: Montvale, New Jersey, US
- Number of locations: 15000 at peak (1930); 296 at liquidation (2015)
- Areas served: United States, Canada
- Number of employees: 28,500 (2015)
- Website: aptea.com at the Wayback Machine (archived October 17, 2015)

The Great Atlantic & Pacific Tea Company, better known as A&P, was an American chain of grocery stores that operated from 1859 to 2015. From 1915 through 1975, A&P was the largest grocery retailer in the United States (and, until 1965, the largest U.S. retailer of any kind).

A&P was considered an American icon that, according to The Wall Street Journal, "was as well known as McDonald's or Google is today", and "the Walmart of its time." At its peak in the 1940s, A&P captured 10% of total US grocery spending. Known for innovation, A&P provided variation in the US consumer's diet and nutritional habits by making available a vast assortment of food products at much lower costs. Until 1982, A&P also was a large food manufacturer.

A&P was founded in 1859 as "Gilman & Company" by George Gilman, who opened a small chain of retail tea and coffee stores in New York City, and then expanded to a national mail order business. The firm grew to 70 stores by 1878; by 1900, it operated almost 200 stores. A&P grew dramatically by introducing the economy store concept in 1912, growing to 1,600 stores by 1915. After World War I, it added stores that offered meat and produce, while expanding manufacturing.

In 1930, A&P, by then the world's largest retailer, reached $2.9 billion in sales ($55.9 billion today) with 15,000 stores. In 1936, it adopted the self-serve supermarket concept and opened 4,000 larger stores (while phasing out many of its smaller units) by 1950. After two bankruptcies, A&P finally closed the last of its doors in 2015.

== History ==
=== 1859–1878: Gilman era ===
The forerunner of A&P was founded in the 1850s as Gilman & Company by George Gilman (1826–1901) to continue his father's leather tanning business; in 1858 the firm's address was 98 Gold Street in Manhattan. Gilman's father died in 1859, leaving the son wealthy. That year, Gilman & Company entered the tea and coffee business from that storefront. One source speculates that Gilman decided to enter a more respectable business in light of his wealth. In May 1861, Gilman turned over the tanning business to his brother Winthrop; George moved his tea business to 129 Front Street. Initially, Gilman & Company was a wholesaler. In early 1863 the firm became a retailer, Great American Tea Company. Quickly, it opened five stores, moving its office and warehouse to 51 Vesey Street.

Gilman proved to be a master at promotion; the business quickly expanded by advertising low prices. The firm was able to offer low prices by acting as both the wholesaler and retailer. Gilman also built a nationwide mail order business. By 1866, the firm was valued at more than $1 million (~$16.8 million in 2024). In 1869, the transcontinental railroad was completed; Gilman created a parallel company, the Great Atlantic & Pacific Tea Company, to promote the then-new concept of prepackaged tea under the Thea-Nector name. The tea company, which some sources say was co-founded by George Huntington Hartford, continued to use the Great American name for mail-order purposes. In 1871, A&P introduced another concept when it offered premiums, such as lithographs, china, and glassware with the purchase of coffee and/or tea at its stores. These premiums are now collectibles.

=== 1878–1951: Hartford era ===
==== Evolution of the grocery store ====
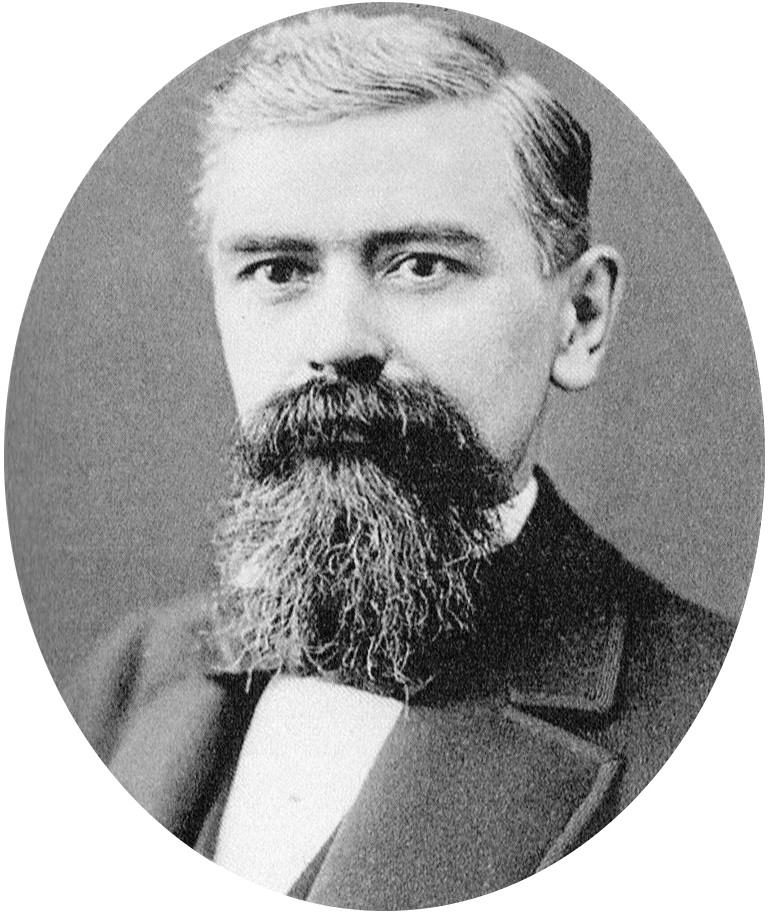
George Huntington Hartford, mid-1870s

Hartford joined Gilman & Company as a clerk perhaps in the late 1850s; Hartford later was promoted to bookkeeper, then cashier, in 1866. By 1871 Hartford was in a position of authority and was responsible for expanding A&P to Chicago after its great fire. A&P's first store outside New York City was opened just days after the disaster. The firm rapidly expanded; in 1875 A&P had stores in 16 cities. In 1878, Gilman left the active management of the firm to Hartford. By then, the firm operated 70 lavishly equipped stores and a mail order business with combined annual sales of $1 million.

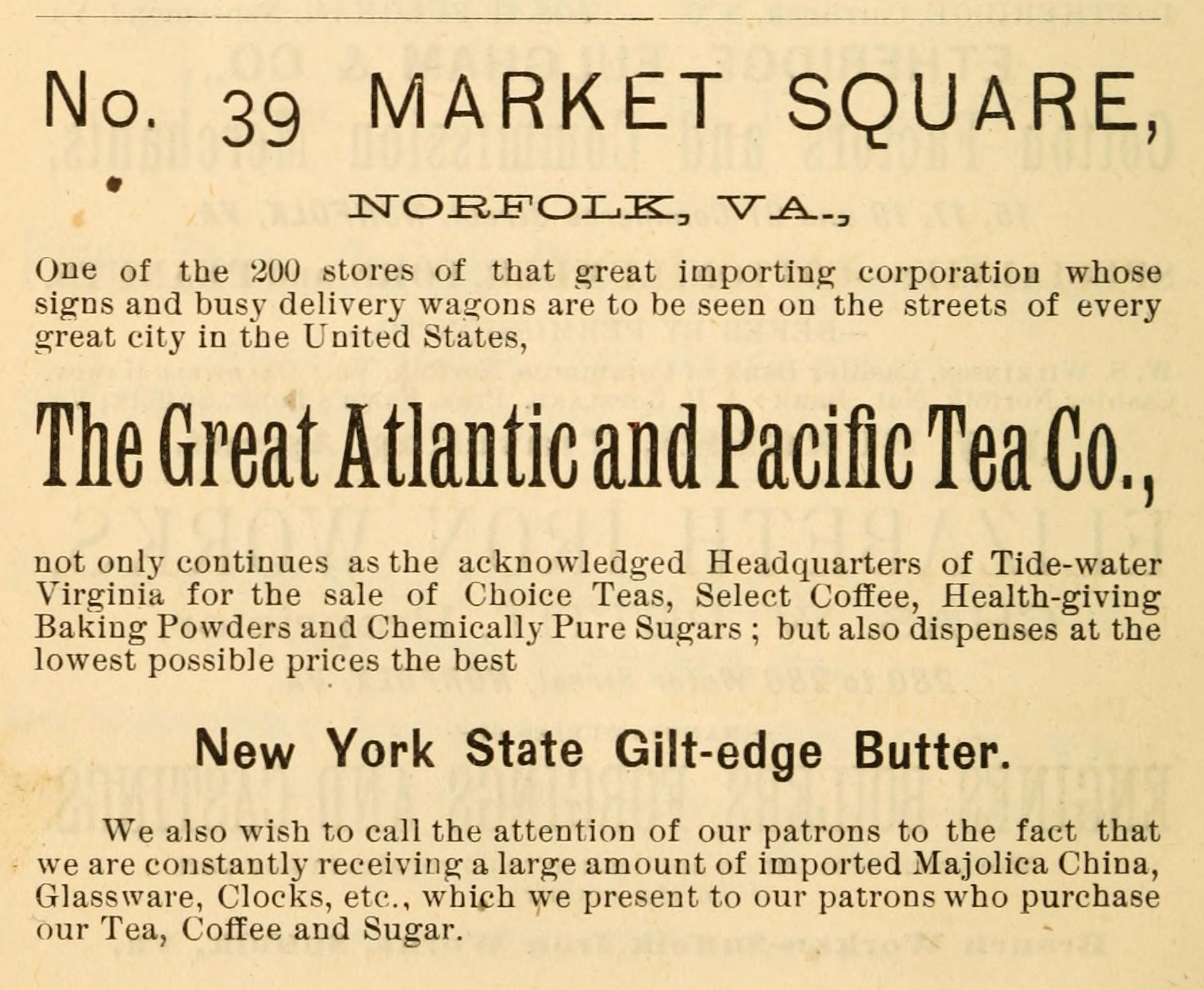
A 1888 advertisement for A&P from a Norfolk, Virginia, guidebook, listing the range of items carried

To raise revenue, Congress raised tariffs on tea and coffee. Profits on these products declined; around 1880 A&P started to sell sugar in its stores. The company continued aggressive growth and by 1884 operated stores as far west as Kansas City and as far south as Atlanta. The company also operated wagon routes to serve rural customers. About this time, two of Hartford's sons, George (1864–1957) and John (1872–1951), joined the firm. A&P lore holds that George convinced his father to expand the product line to include A&P-branded baking powder. Over the next decade, the company added other A&P-branded products, such as condensed milk, spices, and butter. As it expanded its offerings, the tea company was gradually creating the first grocery chain. By 1900, the firm had sales of $5 million (~$155 million in 2024) from 198 stores as well as its mail order and wagon route operations. However, other grocery chains were expanding more rapidly and blanketing their respective areas while the tea company's stores were spread over a much larger area. A&P quickly found itself at a disadvantage.

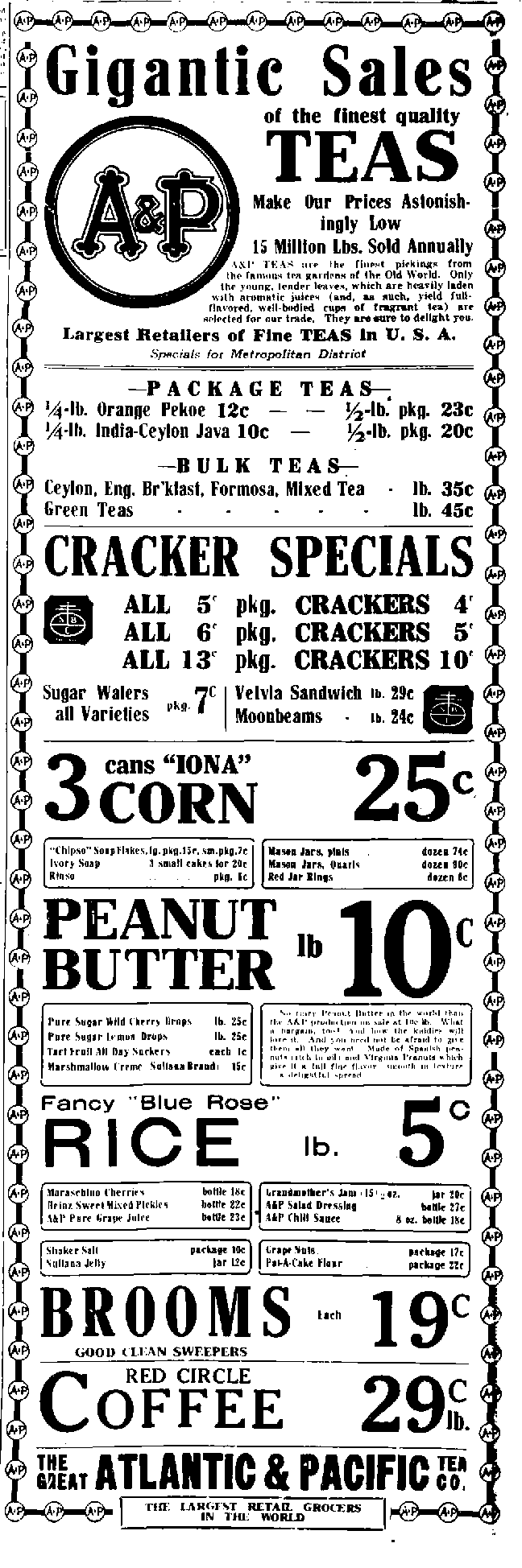
An A&P newspaper ad from New York City, 1922

In 1901, George Gilman died without a will, starting a legal battle among his numerous heirs. The senior Hartford stepped into the battle by asserting that, in 1878, Gilman gave him half of the company in an unwritten partnership agreement. Evidence provided to the court established that Hartford received half of A&P's profits starting in 1878 and that the company's leases were in his name. The heirs realized that without Hartford, the firm would quickly become unprofitable. Therefore, in 1902 they agreed to a settlement where A&P was to be incorporated, with $2.1 million (~$61.4 million in 2024) in assets.

Under this agreement, the Gilman heirs received $1.25 million in preferred shares at 6% interest, while Hartford received $700,000 in common stock and the remainder of the preferred shares. This gave Hartford control of the voting stock. Over several years, Hartford was able to repurchase the preferred shares from the Gilman heirs. A&P opened an average of one store every three weeks. A nine-story headquarters and warehouse was built in Jersey City; it later expanded to include a manufacturing plant and bakery.

By 1908, George Hartford Sr. divided management responsibilities among his sons, with George Jr. controlling finance with John directing sales and operations. The sons ran A&P for over 40 years. The younger Hartford moved aggressively to promote the A&P brand, dramatically increasing the product line. To make space for the new items, A&P replaced in-store premiums with Plaid Stamps, which sought to mimic S&H Green Stamps, a popular rewards program. By 1912, the corporation operated 400 stores and averaged a 22% gross margin, resulting in a 2% profit. A&P's peddlers were also operating 5,000 rural routes in distinctive red-and-black wagons.

==== Development of economy stores ====
Food prices were a political issue in the 1912 presidential election after a 35% increase in 10 years. To counter this trend, some chains experimented with a no-frills format. After long debate, the Hartfords agreed to John's proposal of experimenting with an economy store designed to operate at a 12% gross margin. Capitalized at only $3,000 including its initial inventory, the prototype economy store operated with only a manager, and without fancy fixtures. Within two months, weekly sales increased to $800 and the store achieved a 30% annual return on investment. A&P quickly expanded the concept; by 1915 the chain operated 1,600 stores.

A&P's tremendous growth created problems with suppliers. Cream of Wheat, the largest breakfast food manufacturer, demanded that all retailers adhere to the cereal's pricing per box. A&P purchased the product at wholesale, 11 cents per box (3 cents less), and decided that a 1-cent markup was appropriate for its economy store format. Cream of Wheat cut off supplies and A&P sued. U.S. District Court Judge Charles Hough ruled against A&P, saying that a manufacturer can establish retail prices. As a result, A&P and other large chains expanded manufacturing of private brands.

Hartford Sr. died in 1917; control of the company passed into a trust with his sons George, Edward, and John as trustees in complete control.

==== Adding stores that included grocery, meat, produce, and dairy ====
After World War I, A&P rapidly expanded; in 1925 it operated 13,961 stores. The newer combination stores included space for meats, produce, and dairy, as well as traditional grocery items. Sales reached $400 million and profit was $10 million. However, the Hartford brothers were concerned that gross margins had reached 22% to cover higher costs and that the chain veered from its low-cost discipline. In early 1926, the brothers discussed the situation with division management and launched a program to lower prices and improve cost controls. That year, sales increased 32%; A&P moved its headquarters to the new Graybar Building adjacent to Grand Central Terminal.

In 1927, A&P established a Canadian division; by 1929 it operated 200 stores in Ontario and Quebec. In 1930, the corporation's 16,000 stores reached $2.9 billion (~$43.2 billion in 2024) in sales, resulting in a 25% grocery-store share in its operating areas, and about 10% nationwide. No retail company had ever achieved these results. A&P was twice as large as the next largest retailer, Sears, and four times that of grocer Kroger. Unlike most of its competitors, A&P was in excellent position to weather the Great Depression. The Hartfords built their chain without borrowing; their low-price format resulted in even higher sales. From 1929 through 1932, A&P reported a record $110 million in after-tax profits with each Hartford child earning over $5 million yearly in dividends and equity.

A&P's success caused a backlash that threatened to destroy it. Thousands of mom-and-pop grocery stores could not match A&P's prices. While small operators had little political clout, they were supplied by thousands of wholesale distributors which had considerable political influence. Anti-chain store movements gained traction in the 1920s, but became stronger during the Depression. In 1935, Texas Congressman Wright Patman introduced legislation that would have levied a federal tax on chain stores. If adopted, this legislation likely would have ended A&P.

While this legislation did not move in Congress, in 1936 Patman sponsored the Robinson–Patman Act that outlawed charging different prices to similar customers; this law passed. Patman then reintroduced his first bill. A&P retained a lobbyist and dropped its opposition to unionizing activities of the politically powerful American Federation of Labor (AFL). George and John Hartford also took the unusual step of publishing an open letter pointing out that the legislation would increase food prices. The tide of public opinion then turned against the bill, which was defeated.

==== Converting to supermarkets ====
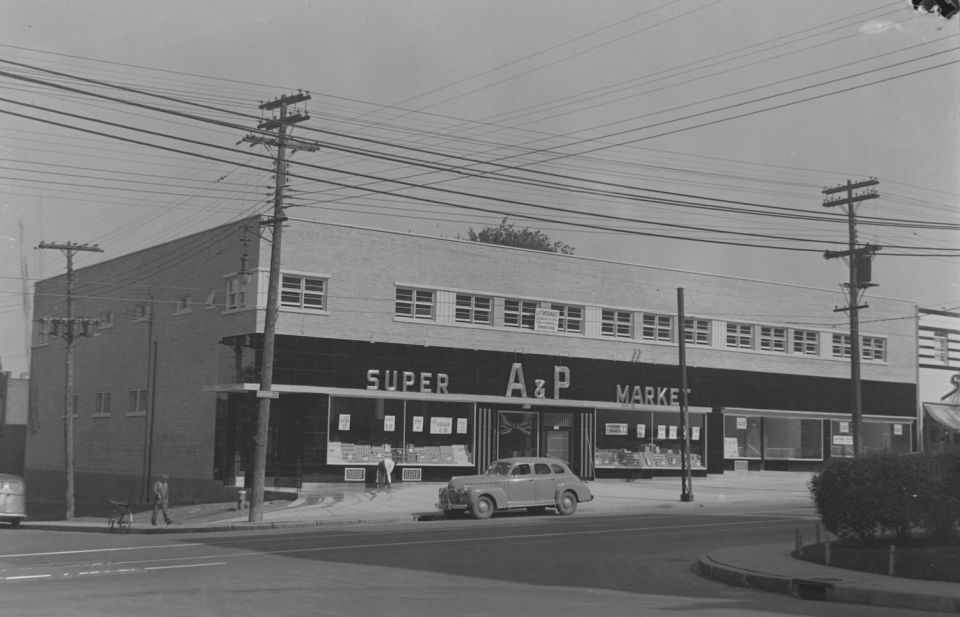
An A&P supermarket, in Snowdon, Quebec, 1941

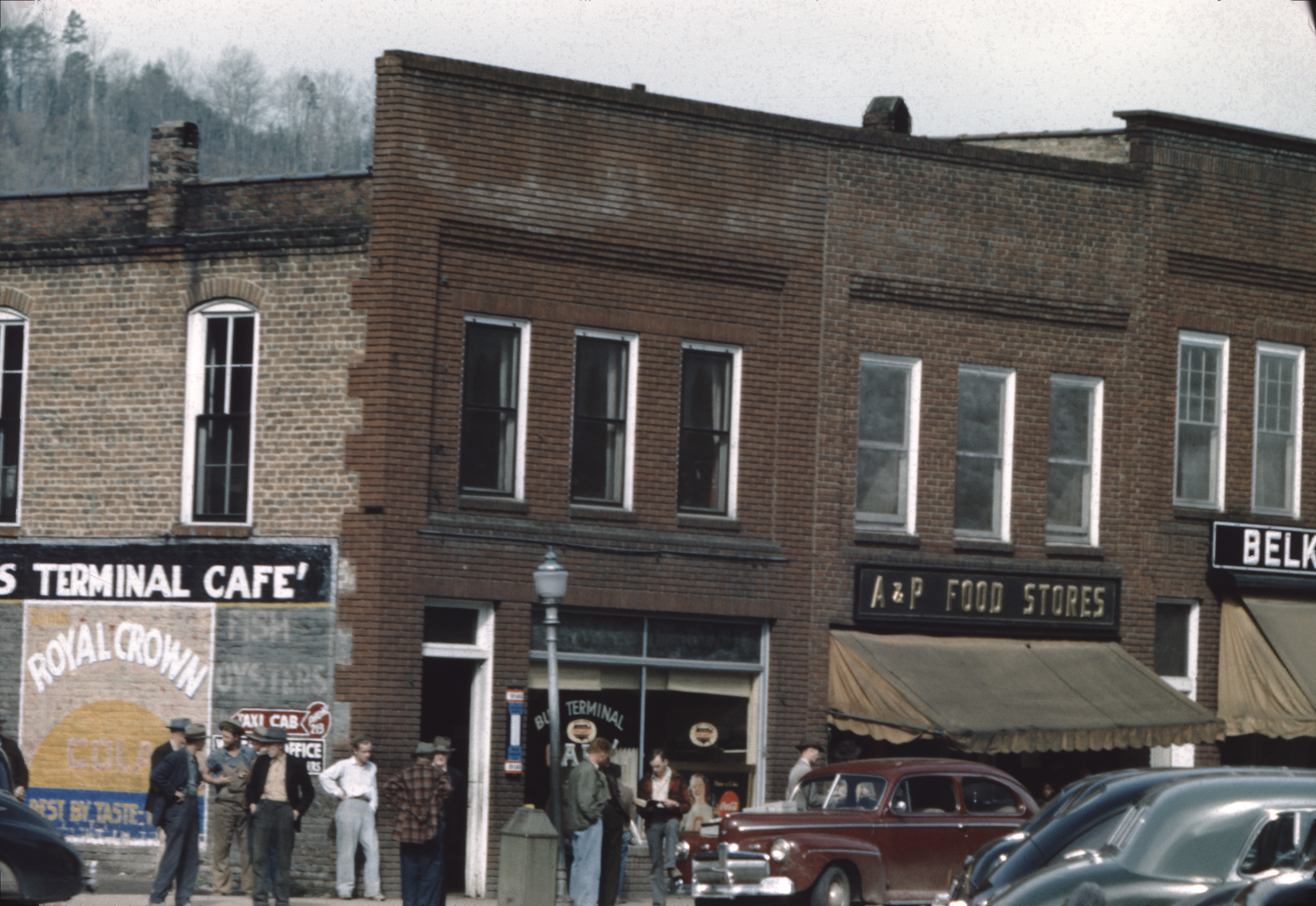
An A&P store in the 1940s

In 1930, the first supermarket opened in California. On the East Coast, Michael J. Cullen, a then-former A&P employee, opened his first King Kullen supermarket in Jamaica, Queens. Two years later, Big Bear opened in Elizabeth, New Jersey, and quickly equaled the sales of 100 A&Ps. In 1933, A&P's sales dropped 19%, to $820 million, because of the competition. After considerable debate, the Hartford brothers decided to open 100 supermarkets, the first of which was in Braddock, Pennsylvania. The new stores proved to be very successful; in 1938, the company operated 1,100 supermarkets. The chain continued to build supermarkets and slowly phase out smaller stores except in dense urban areas; in 1950, A&P operated 4,000 supermarkets and 500 smaller stores. Sales reached $3.2 billion with an after-tax profit of $32 million.

A&P's success attracted the attention of President Franklin D. Roosevelt's anti-trust chief, Thurman Arnold, who was urged by Representative Wright Patman to investigate A&P. In 1942, A&P and their senior executives—including the Hartford brothers—were criminally charged for restraint of trade in Dallas federal court. In 1944, prosecutors withdrew the complaint on grounds that the Dallas federal judge thought the case was weak.

The same day the Dallas case was withdrawn, charges were filed in Danville, Illinois against the same defendants, and were assigned to Federal Judge Walter Lindley. The prosecution complained that A&P had an unfair competitive advantage because their vertical integration—including manufacturing, warehousing, and retailing—allowed them to charge lower prices. Prosecutors also complained that A&P refused to buy from food retailers who sold only through brokers or refused to give A&P advertising allowances. The judges contended that if unchecked, A&P would become a monopoly. A&P said their grocery-store share was only about 15%, much less than the leaders in other industries. Judge Lindley agreed with the government, fining each defendant $10,000.

In 1949, the U.S. Court of Appeals upheld Lindley's decision; A&P decided not to appeal further. In September, the anti-trust division asked the court to order the spinoff of A&P's manufacturing operations and the breakup of A&P's retail operations into seven independent companies. Thousands of letters poured into the Justice Department supporting A&P; the Hartford brothers gave extensive interviews with Time magazine and appeared on the November 13, 1950, cover. Time wrote that, next to General Motors, A&P sold more goods than any other retailer in the world. John was quoted as saying, "I don't know any grocer who wants to stay small ... I don't see how any businessman can limit his growth and stay healthy." The case dragged on into the business-friendly Eisenhower administration. In late 1953, the government agreed to drop its demands to break up A&P if they shut down their produce brokerage that also supplied competitors.

In fighting the anti-trust suits, A&P also emphasized the considerable impact of their activities on the public welfare, which had been recognized as the legacy of George Hartford Sr. and his sons. The concepts pioneered and perfected by the Hartfords and their competitors enabled the public to enjoy healthier eating at lower cost. In 1950, the average American consumed 10 percent more food than in 1930, with poorer households enjoying an especially important improvement in the quality of the food they consumed. John Kenneth Galbraith supported this contention in his 1952 book American Capitalism by citing A&P as an example of countervailing power. To support his thesis, he discussed a 1937 A&P study of the feasibility of opening a plant to manufacture corn flakes. The mere possibility of A&P producing corn flakes forced existing corn flake manufacturers to lower their prices by 10%.

=== 1951–1974: Post-Hartford era ===
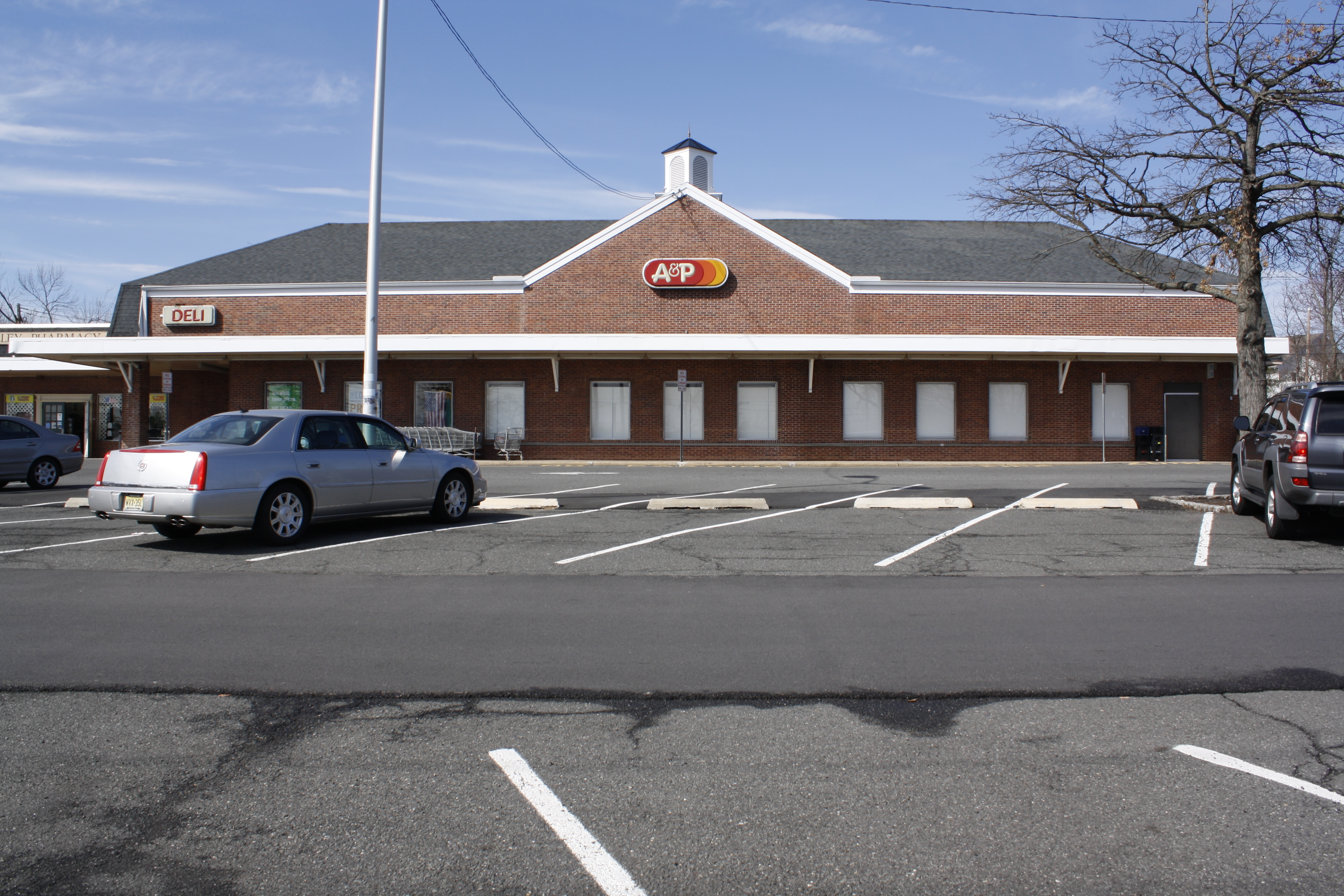
A&P's new stores from 1955 to 1970 tended to be smaller than competitors. This unit, in Pluckemin, New Jersey, remained unchanged (except for A&P's "sunrise" logo) until it closed in 2013.

In 1951, John Hartford died in the Chrysler Building after returning from a meeting of the automaker's board of directors. George remained as A&P's chairman and treasurer, appointing the corporation's longtime secretary Ralph Burger as its new president. While Burger started with A&P in 1910 as a clerk in Glens Falls, New York, he was a staffer who lacked John Hartford's strategic marketing skills. Under Burger, A&P continued to report record sales and operated with expenses of 12.6% of sales when the industry average was 15%.

Burger was also president of the John A. Hartford Foundation started by sons John and George in 1929, assuring Burger's control of A&P when George died in 1957. George's trust was dissolved; the stock began selling on the New York Stock Exchange (under the symbol GAP) at $59 per share. For the first time, A&P elected six outside directors onto its board. In late 1961, A&P stock peaked at $70 (~$561.00 in 2024).

The seeds for A&P's 35-year fall from the country's largest grocery to bankruptcy (and later liquidation) were planted in the 1950s:

- A&P was starved of capital. While A&P was publicly traded, control rested with Burger, who headed both the corporation and the Hartford Foundation. Most of A&P's profit was declared as dividends to satisfy the income needs of the trust and its heirs. A&P also remained opposed to debt financing; the only source of capital was the depreciation account. While competitors invested in larger, modern supermarkets, A&P was slow to update its retail capital plant. By 1970, A&P stores were considerably smaller and mostly older than those of its competitors.
- A&P placed too much emphasis on private label products. In 1951, the Supreme Court ruled that manufacturers could not establish minimum prices unless the retailer agreed to the arrangement. This decision launched a revolution in discount retailing fueled by the rapid increase in television advertising that raised demand for national brands. Contrary to this, A&P invested substantial amounts of its scarce capital to expand manufacturing, including $25 million to construct the world's largest food plant in Horseheads, New York. Because A&P stores were smaller, its shelves were dominated by private-label products, and customers found that national brands were often out of stock.
- A&P's labor costs were higher than those of most competitors. Because A&P stopped growing, a rising percentage of its workers were making higher wages due to their seniority. This was not a problem for most of A&P's competitors because they were rapidly expanding and had relatively fewer workers with high seniority. To offset higher labor costs, A&P tried to operate stores with fewer employees, resulting in long lines at checkouts and empty shelves.

Ralph Burger attempted to reverse downward tonnage figures by reintroducing trading stamps, creating A&P's Plaid Stamps. However, by late 1962, the initial sales gains evaporated and the six outside directors threatened to resign unless Burger retired. When Burger left in May 1963, the stock was trading in the $30s (~$315.00 in 2025). Burger was replaced with a succession of presidents who were unable to stem the downward spiral. In 1971, the board turned to William J. Kane, who joined A&P in 1934 as a full-time store clerk. Kane believed that A&P could be turned around by focusing on basic store operations, including cleanliness, product availability, customer service, and courtesy.

When his program stalled, Kane implemented a strategy to substantially cut prices by converting A&P to a warehouse store concept that became known as W.E.O. Warehouse Economy Outlet (or Where Economy Originates). The problem was that most A&Ps were not large enough to properly implement the program; losses quickly mounted. In early 1973, the stock dropped to $17, and Charles Bluhdorn of Gulf+Western made a tender offer at $20 per share. Kane rejected the offer, although some stockholders thought that the offer was attractive considering A&P's continuing difficulties. A&P exited California and Washington state in 1971 and 1974, respectively, making Missouri its westernmost reach. In 1974, the corporation also left its long-time headquarters in the Graybar Building, moving to Montvale, New Jersey.

=== 1975–2001: Scott/Wood era ===
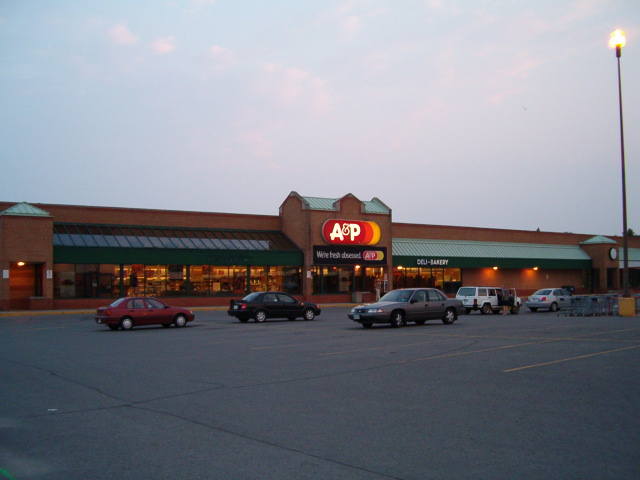
During the Scott/Wood era, A&P started to build modern stores. This unit was in Belleville, Ontario. Note the "sunrise" logo introduced in 1975.

In February 1975, A&P considered a plan by Booz Allen Hamilton to close 36% of its 3,468 stores. Kane agreed to resign and was replaced by Jonathan Scott, the 44-year-old president of Albertsons. Under Scott, A&P closed 1,500 stores in three years, reducing to 1,978 units. Scott hired numerous executives from outside and pushed authority down to the regional level. During his first three years, A&P built 300 supermarkets ranging from 23,000 square feet (2,100 m^{2}) to 32,000 square feet (3,000 m^{2}), along with its first combination grocery-drug stores with 40,000 square feet (3,700 m^{2}) under the A&P Family Mart name. The first Family Mart opened in Greenville, South Carolina, as The Family Mart in 1977.

The Family Mart chain consisted of mostly 40,000–55,000 square feet (3,700–5,100 m^{2}) stores, and were among the first A&P stores to possess a combination of a full-service supermarket and pharmacy. Scott continued Kane's efforts to improve basic store operations (including cleanliness and customer service) instituting a large training program. Weekly per-store sales increased from $37,000 in 1974 to over $70,000 in 1976, with total sales increasing from $6.4 billion to $7.2 billion despite the closures. Manufacturing was also reorganized. While initial results were promising, by 1978, A&P profits started to slide due to economic conditions caused by high inflation.

The A&P sunrise logo designed by Lippincott & Margulies, 1975–2006

With the share price down to $7, the John A. Hartford Foundation finally came to the conclusion that it could no longer wait for a turnaround. Erivan Haub, owner of the German Tengelmann Group, expressed interest. Born in 1930, Haub studied retailing in the U.S. after World War II and built his family's grocery business into a 2,000-store chain with annual sales of the equivalent of $2 billion. Although still having a home in Germany, his children were born in the United States.

Haub agreed to pay $7.375 per share for 42% of A&P's stock. Haub also quietly bought other shares until he owned 50.3% in February 1981. Scott did not renew his five-year contract; Haub hired James Wood to become chairman. Wood, an Englishman who was the same age as Haub, previously ran the American Grand Union supermarket chain. Many executives recruited by Scott left A&P; they were replaced by Wood's associates from Grand Union.

In Germany, Tengelmann had considerable success with Plus stores; they were smaller units featuring low price private-label products along with a limited assortment of meats and produce. A&P opened several divisions of Plus stores in the U.S. to take advantage of A&P's manufacturing plants and numerous small stores. However, the concept failed to win American customers who were attracted to other chains offering low prices on national brands.

James Wood realized that another massive store-closing program was necessary to turn around A&P. In October 1981, it announced that it would downsize to under 1,000 stores and close the Chicago division. Under the plan, A&P also closed its large manufacturing group except the four coffee warehouses. To finance this program, A&P planned to terminate its non-union pension plan, using its $200 million surplus. The plan's obligations were covered by annuities that cost only about $130 million because of the then high interest rates. A&P's non-union employees were covered by a defined contribution 401(k).

William Walsh, then a recently retired executive, filed a class action that was ultimately settled by increasing the value of the annuities. A&P still realized over $200 million and was not required to pay taxes because of tax losses carried forward from previous closing programs. The Philadelphia division also was to close, unless the unions agreed to contract concessions. When the unions refused, A&P started implementing the plan. The unions offered to purchase the stores, but realized that they did not have the capital required. As an alternative, the unions agreed to a profit-sharing arrangement if A&P formed a new subsidiary, and operated under a different name. The new banner, "Super Fresh", proved profitable. A&P realized that its name was not the asset it had been.

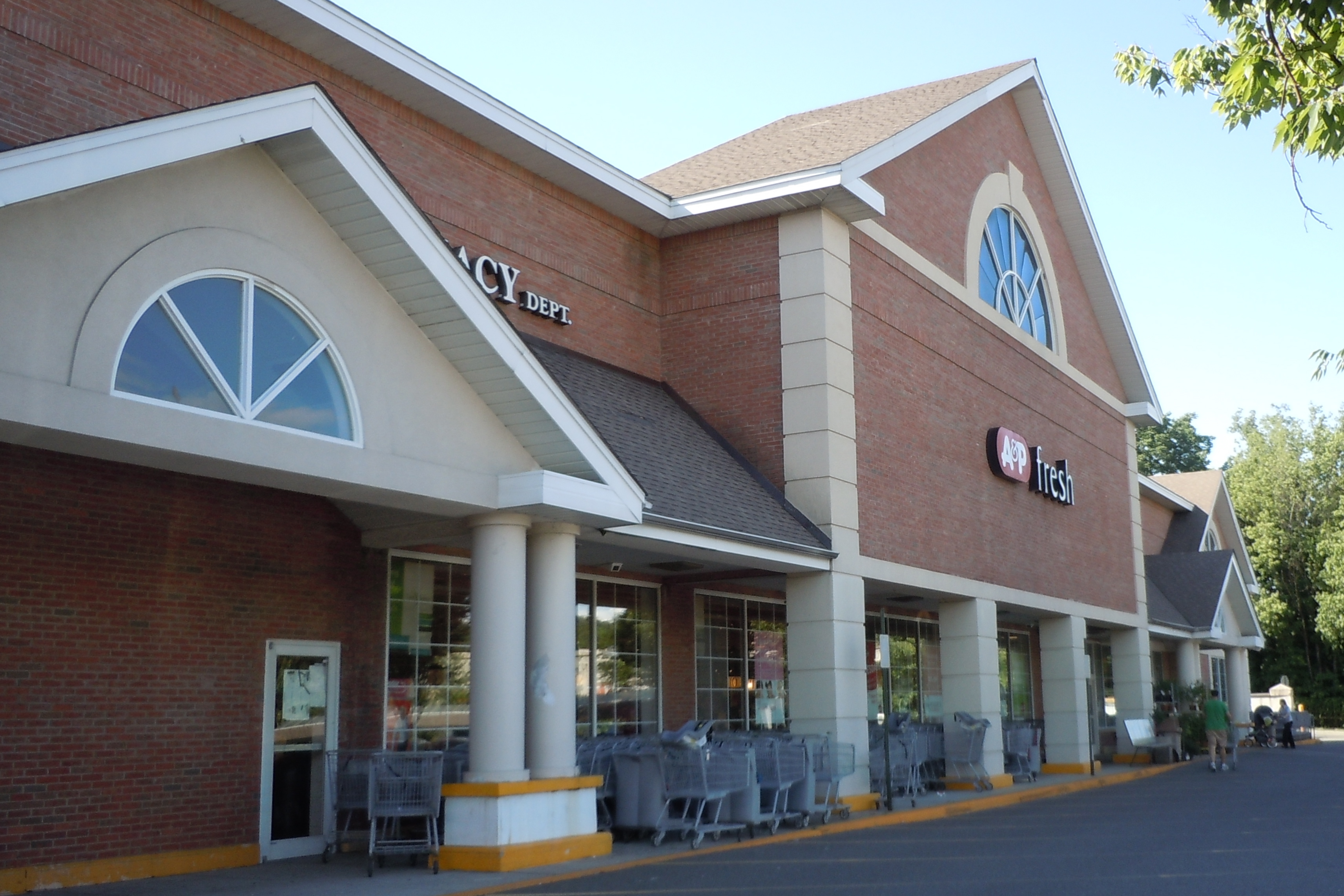
A&P Fresh Midland Park, New Jersey: It became an ACME in 2015 due to A&P's liquidation.

A&P started to acquire stores from other chains. Starting in 1982, A&P acquired several chains that continued to be operated under their own names, rather than being converted to A&P. While A&P regained profitability in the 1980s, in 2002 it operated at a record loss because of new competition, especially from Walmart. A&P closed more stores, which included the sale of its large Canadian division. A&P also spun off Eight O'Clock Coffee, the last of its manufacturing units. In 1982, Stop & Shop exited New Jersey, not returning for almost 20 years. A&P purchased most of these stores to replace obsolete ones. In 1983, A&P bought Wisconsin-based Kohl's Food Stores (which had been part of the Kohl's department store chain) from BATUS, enabling A&P to reenter Wisconsin and Illinois. In 1984, A&P purchased Pantry Pride's Richmond, Virginia, division. The next year, A&P reinforced its profitable Canadian division by closing stores in Quebec, and acquiring Ontario's Dominion Stores. In the U.S., A&P started construction of larger 40,000-square-foot (4,000 m^{2}) supermarkets known as A&P Future Stores.

In 1986, A&P purchased Waldbaum's (with stores in southern New York and southern New England) and The Food Emporium, the latter an upscale New York City-based chain. In 1989, A&P acquired Michigan-based Farmer Jack; also, A&P attempted to expand into Europe by bidding unsuccessfully for the Gateway Corporation (then the United Kingdom's third-largest grocery chain), although they did open stores in the Netherlands, which they operated until the early 2000s. At the end of the decade, A&P reported a profit of 1.3% (compared to an industry average of 1.04%) on sales of $11 billion.

In the early 1990s, A&P started to struggle again because of the economy and new competition, especially Walmart. In 1992, A&P's sales dropped to $1.1 billion; it posted a loss of $189 million. A&P responded by strengthening its private label program and overhauling its remaining U.S. units. Most stores smaller than 40,000 square feet (4,000 m^{2}) were expanded, closed, or replaced with units from 50,000 square feet (5,000 m^{2}) to 80,000 square feet (7,000 m^{2}). The new stores included pharmacies, larger bakeries, and more general merchandise.

A&P continued to suffer in the South and abandoned most of the region by pulling out of Alabama, Florida, Georgia, Kentucky, the Carolinas, Tennessee, and Virginia. Most of these stores were sold to Kroger. As a result, A&P was reduced to four regions: the Northeast, the Midwest (Michigan and Wisconsin), New Orleans, and Ontario. To reinforce the New Orleans division, A&P purchased six Schwegmann supermarkets; however, A&P was now reduced to 600 stores. Christian W.E. Haub, the youngest son of Erivan, became co-CEO in 1994 and CEO in 1997 when Wood retired from that post. In 2001, Wood also retired as chairman, with Haub assuming that title as well.

=== 2001–2015: Final years as a supermarket chain ===
A&P modified its sunrise logo in 2005, removing the colored bands and shrinking the oval's size. A modified version of this logo was still used on Best Cellars liquor stores until their closure.

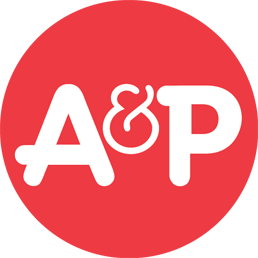
Upon becoming a private company in 2012, A&P debuted a circular logo. The previous two logos were also used until the supermarkets closed.

Nationwide, Walmart gained a dominant position in the grocery industry, forcing much of the competition to downsize, though in A&P's core Northeast region, Walmart still had not become a major grocery competitor. In 2003, after declaring its largest loss, A&P closed Kohl's Food Stores and A&P's remaining stores in Vermont and New Hampshire, reducing it to just over 500 stores. Also in 2003, A&P spun off the Eight O'Clock Coffee division (its last manufacturing operation) to Gryphon Investors for $107 million. (In 2006, Gryphon sold Eight O'Clock Coffee to Tata Global Beverages for $220 million).

In 2005, A&P sold its 237-store Canadian division (consisting of A&P, Dominion, Ultra Food and Drug stores, as well as the Canadian Food Basics units) to Montreal-based Metro Inc. for Can$1.7 billion in cash plus shares of Metro. By 2009, the A&P name disappeared from these stores. In 2007, A&P closed its New Orleans division, limiting A&P's footprint to the Northeast. Also in 2007, A&P acquired Pathmark, a long-time Northeastern rival, for $1.4 billion (~$2.03 billion in 2024). With this purchase, A&P again became the largest supermarket operator in the New York City area. At the same time, Tengelmann reduced its shares to 38.5%, while the private equity firm Yucaipa, as major shareholder of Pathmark, acquired 27.5% of A&P's shares. In 2012, A&P emerged from bankruptcy by becoming a private company, as Tengelmann ended its holding, and briefly returned to modest profitability in 2013 and 2014.

This allowed A&P to regain its position as the largest grocery retailer in the New York City area, and the second-largest in the Philadelphia area. However, the Federal Trade Commission declared that as a result of the acquisition, A&P would be a monopoly in parts of Long Island and Staten Island. As part of its settlement with the FTC, the corporation was forced to divest of some Waldbaum's and Pathmarks.

When A&P marked its 150th anniversary in 2009, it was ranked only No. 21 by Supermarket News of the top 75 North American grocery retailers based on 2008 fiscal year estimated sales of US$9.6 billion (~$13.7 billion in 2024). Tengelmann held approximately 38.5 percent of A&P, with Yucaipa holding a 27.5 percent share; the rest was held by individual shareholders and investor groups. Christian Haub was chairman. Eric Claus, then president and CEO, left A&P, with Sam Martin assuming these responsibilities.

==== First Chapter 11 bankruptcy (2010) ====
Rise and decline in number of stores
Year	No. of stores
1863	5
1878	70
1900	400
1915	1,600
1930	15,709
1950	4,500
1970	4,000
1980	2,000
1990	1,000
2000	600
2010	395
2015	296
All stores were closed by November 25, 2015.

The Great Recession affected many supermarkets as customers migrated to discount markets in even greater numbers. A&P was especially hard hit because of its increased debt load to complete the Pathmark purchase. In June 2010, A&P stopped paying $150 million (~$210 million in 2024) in rent on the closed Farmer Jack stores. In August, A&P announced that it would close another 25 stores in Connecticut, Maryland, New Jersey, New York, and Pennsylvania: 13 Pathmarks, 6 A&Ps, 2 Waldbaum's, and 4 Super Fresh stores. In September, A&P announced it was selling seven Connecticut stores to Big Y.

On December 10, 2010, bankruptcy rumors surfaced; A&P stock tumbled from over $3 per share to below $1 before trading was halted. Two days later, A&P announced it was filing for Chapter 11 bankruptcy. According to documents submitted to U.S. Bankruptcy Court in White Plains, New York, A&P listed over $2.5 billion in assets, and $3.2 billion in debt.

After the filing, A&P remained in operation (with its stock symbol changed to GAPTQ) while it developed a reorganization plan. In November 2011, the corporation announced that it had entered into an agreement to receive $490 million (~$672 million in 2024) of debt and equity financing from Yucaipa, Mount Kellett Capital Management, and investment funds managed by Goldman Sachs Asset Management. The agreement enabled A&P to complete its restructuring and emerge from Chapter 11 as a private entity in early 2012. At this time, Christian Haub left A&P, and Tengelmann wrote off its books the remaining equity.

==== Second Chapter 11 bankruptcy and supermarket shutdown ====
A&P briefly returned to modest profitability by cutting costs in its remaining stores, although customer spending further decreased. In 2013, again a company, A&P was put up for sale but could not find a suitable buyer. In January 2014, Sam Martin resigned. In March, Paul Hertz was named CEO and President as the company broke even. On January 15, 2015, the trade publication Supermarket News reported that A&P was still for sale.

There were rumors of several parties being interested, including Cerberus, still owning Albertsons assets. However, no suitable offers were received. In May, rumors emerged that A&P was in more financial trouble as it declared a huge loss (in April) for the previous year, losing more business to better-managed competition. As customers were staying away, A&P considered its second bankruptcy filing in less than five years.

There were rumors that A&P would sell all stores more than 40 miles from its corporate offices, shrinking the company to about 100 stores. Other rumors were that the company would sell all its stores. Rumors also surfaced about a Chapter 7 bankruptcy and total liquidation, selling the company in pieces, as well as a Chapter 11 bankruptcy with selling in pieces. The company remained for sale as a whole, receiving no bids for any of its stores. Other alternatives were explored, including selling other assets.

On July 19, 2015, A&P filed for Chapter 11 bankruptcy protection, immediately closing 25 underperforming stores. The next day, A&P announced that 76 of its stores (including Super Fresh and Pathmark units, as well as one Food Emporium unit) had been sold to Albertsons (owner of Philadelphia-based Acme Markets). Stop & Shop purchased 25 units, mainly Pathmarks in New York City, Nassau and Suffolk counties. The Key Food co-operative acquired 23 units, mainly in New York City, including all remaining Food Basics and Food Emporium stores.

Morton Williams acquired two Food Emporium stores in Manhattan, while Wakefern Food Corporation, the cooperative which runs ShopRite and PriceRite, acquired 12 units, including 9 Pathmark stores. Local grocers also acquired units either through sales or auctions. All supermarkets were closed by November 25 (Thanksgiving eve). The last remaining portion of A&P, Best Cellars at A&P, had its stores auctioned in summer 2016, with 11 stores sold (none as going concerns) and 6 leases rejected.

== Store design ==
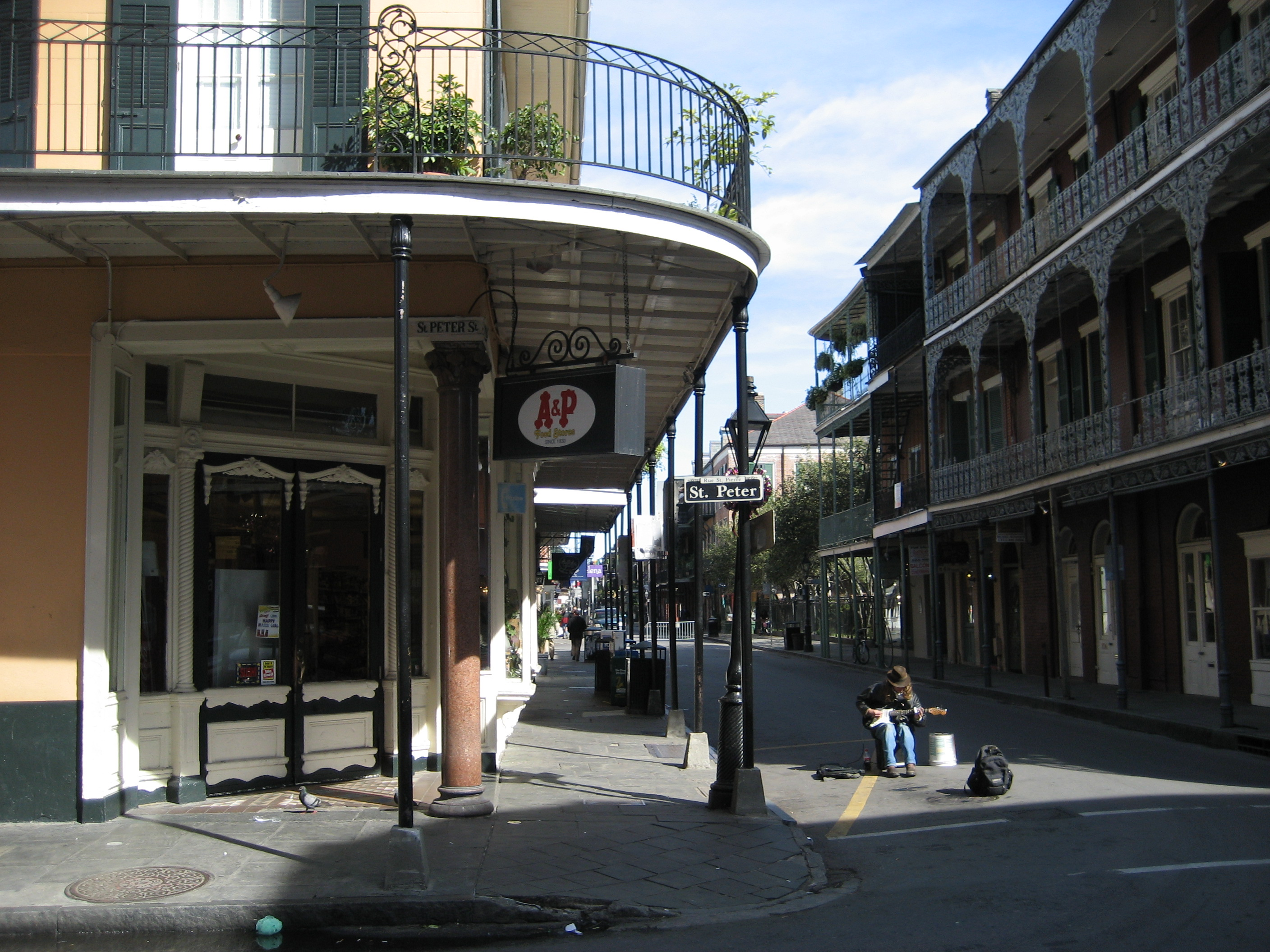
The A&P in New Orleans' French Quarter (1930–2007)

The A&P Historical Society describes early stores as "resplendent emporiums" painted in vermilion and equipped with a large gas light T sign. Interiors included crystal chandeliers, tin ceilings, and walls with gilt-edged Chinese panels. A clerk stood behind a long counter to serve customers (self-service did not become common until the 1930s), and the cashier's station was shaped like a pagoda. When A&P started offering premiums, the wall opposite the counter was equipped with large shelves to display the giveaways.

After John Hartford became responsible for marketing in the 1900s, A&P began offering S&H Green Stamps to free space for the expanded line of groceries available in the stores. The economy stores John Hartford developed in 1912 eliminated frills. Typically 600 square feet (56 m^{2}), these stores were equipped with basic shelving and a small ice box. A&P agreed only to short leases so that it could quickly close unprofitable stores.

In the early 1920s, A&P opened combination grocery/meat/produce stores eventually converting into supermarkets in the 1930s. On average, each supermarket replaced six older combination stores. A&P's policy of agreeing only to short-term leases resulted in differences in store design into the 1950s. During the mid-20th Century A&P stores were considerably smaller in size than those of other chains. As late as 1971, half of the A&P stores were under 8,000 square feet (740 m^{2}).

During the Scott era, store design was modernized and controlled from headquarters. A&P developed four different-sized prototypes: 23,000 square feet (2,100 m^{2}), 28,000 square feet (2,600 m^{2}), 30,000 square feet (2,800 m^{2}), and 32,000 square feet (3,000 m^{2}). Family Mart stores were combination grocery/drug units with 40,000 square feet (3,700 m^{2}) of floor space.

=== Futurestore ===
During the Wood era, A&P developed the "Futurestore" concept; these supermarkets used black-and-white decor. Family Mart would serve as the testbed for the concept design.

Futurestore was one of two concepts A&P launched during the 1980s (the other being Sav-A-Center; also defunct). Futurestore's first supermarket was in the New Orleans area in 1984, where A&P converted two Kroger stores it had acquired. The first conversion of an A&P to the Futurestore format was in New Jersey in 1985.

The Futurestore concept spread to A&Ps in the southeastern US, plus its traditional Mid-Atlantic region (operating in the Philadelphia area under the Super Fresh name), but, in the late 1980s, all Futurestores had been re-branded, or closed.

Like its sibling supermarket, Sav-A-Center, A&P Futurestore was identified by its features and color scheme. The Futurestore interior was black and white, compared to the green and white of Sav-A-Center stores. Most Futurestores also had a glass atrium storefront. In addition, Futurestore signage featured pictograms, similar to those of European supermarkets.

Futurestores typically offered the latest in gourmet departments and electronic services in exclusive neighborhoods. Futurestore's amenities were more gourmet- and specialty-oriented than found at a traditional A&P or Sav-A-Center supermarket. Futurestores also had more modern fixtures and machinery than A&Ps had at the time.

Since the concept was never adopted for a widespread rollout, A&P phased out the Futurestore nameplate, closing some stores and converting others to A&P or Sav-A-Center. Many customers felt Futurestore did not have the same panache of other upscale food retailers, which not only offered more gourmet products, but also cooked and delivered it. A&P, however, did not immediately change the interior of the Futurestores, unlike its Sav-A-Centers, after A&P began to rebrand them as A&P Food Markets in the 1990s.

=== Pharmacies ===
In the mid-1990s, A&P began adding pharmacies, concentrating on building units of 45,000 square feet (4,200 m^{2}) to 65,000 square feet (6,000 m^{2}).

=== Overseas ventures ===
In the early 1980s there was discussion for A&P to open a store in Saudi Arabia. A&P Preservation reported in March 2018 that A&P did open a store in Saudi Arabia, in Riyadh. Tengelmann Representative Petra Czech says that the name was licensed to Saudi operators. The store was most likely converted to the Saudi rendition of Safeway.

== Store names ==
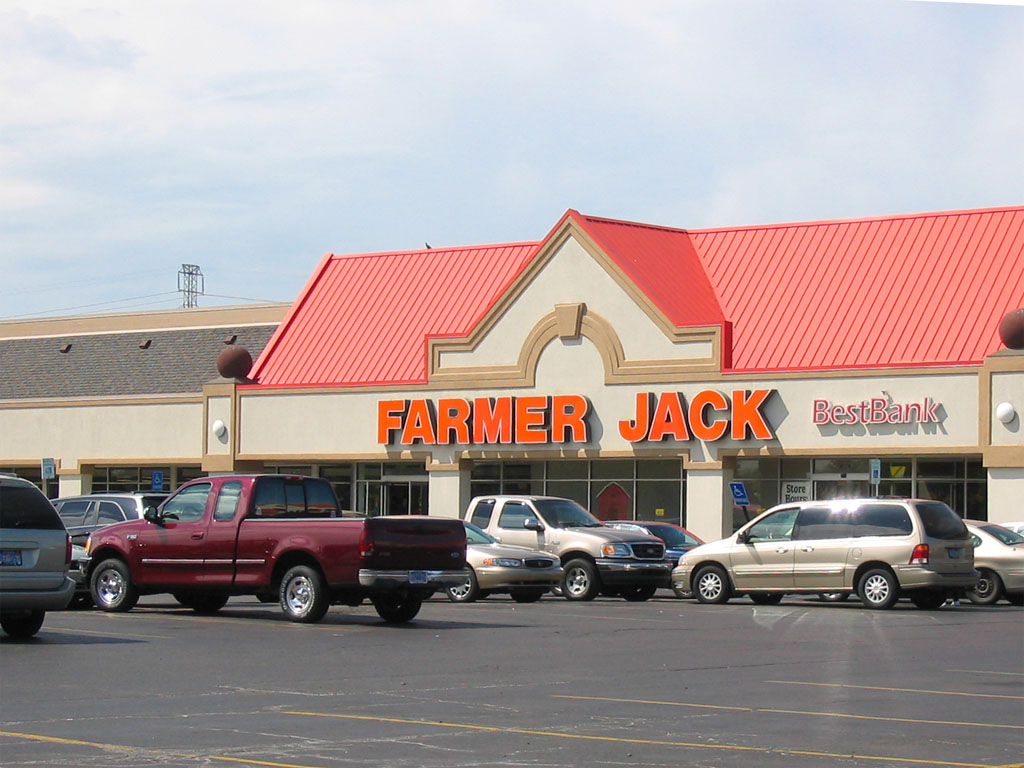
A&P acquired the 79-store Farmer Jack chain in 1989 and used that name until the division was closed in 2007.

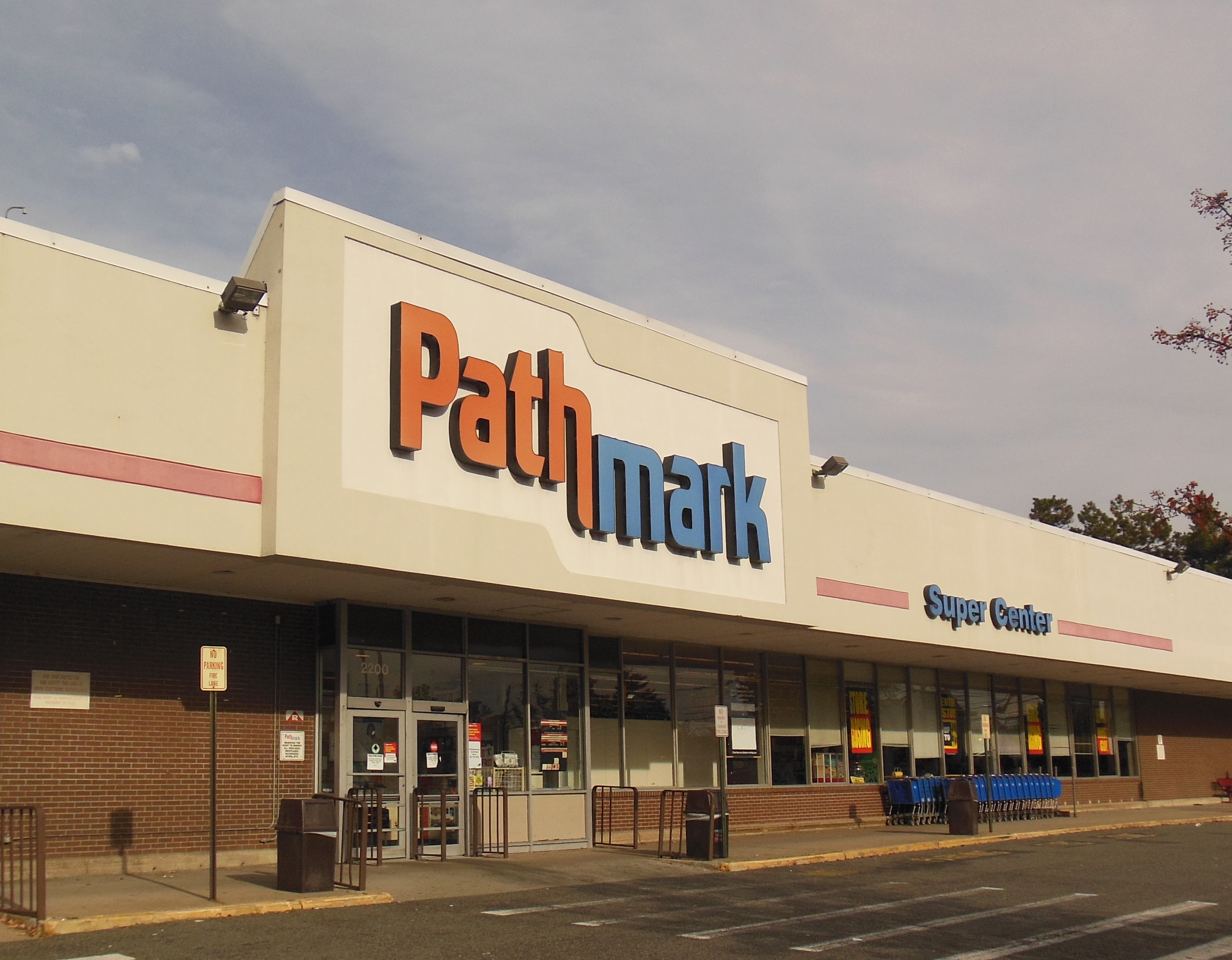
In 2007, A&P acquired the 141-store Pathmark chain, and continued to operate most of them as such until 2015.

For most of its history, A&P operated its stores under that name. That changed during the Scott and Wood eras when A&P created chains, or used the original names of acquired chains. The following were A&P's retail operations under a different name:

- Family Mart: Started in 1977, this chain of large grocery stores/pharmacies was based on similar units built by Skaggs-Albertson's when A&P Chairman Scott worked for the latter. Initially successful, within 10 years Family Mart opened 28 units in Alabama, Florida, Georgia, and the Carolinas. The 18 Family Marts in Florida were sold in 1987 and the remaining Family Marts were closed by 1999.
- Plus: In Germany, Tengelmann operated many small stores under the Plus name, focusing on low-cost no-frills operations. After acquiring a majority stake of A&P, Tengelmann converted some of A&P's smaller stores to the Plus concept.
- Super Fresh: When A&P announced the closure of its Philadelphia division (which included Delaware, Maryland, and southern New Jersey) during the 1981–82 restructuring, the unions offered to buy many of these stores. A&P agreed; the corporation and the unions settled on a new labor agreement that included a profit-sharing provision. The agreement also called for the stores to be operated under a new name, Super Fresh. These stores proved to be profitable, and in 1986 the name was extended to supermarkets in the District of Columbia, and Virginia; the latter included Richmond-area Pantry Pride stores A&P purchased in 1981. Super Fresh stores were still in operation when A&P began liquidation. In the subsequent auction, Super Fresh brand was acquired by Key Food and later re-launched, primarily in and around Newark, New Jersey, rather than its original Philadelphia footprint.
- Food Basics (US & CA): In the early 2000s when the recession was hitting formerly prominent middle class areas, A&P had recorded record losses for stores in New Jersey suburbs such as Paterson, North Bergen, and Glassboro. A&P quickly turned around these unprofitable stores into a no-frills supermarket, called Food Basics. It offered the bare staples in the grocery department at a lower price. The stores featured both the America's Choice and Food Basics storebrands, as well as the normal name brand items other A&P-owned stores sold. By 2010, Food Basics operated more than a dozen stores in lower-class New Jersey cities, and several Super Fresh-turned-Food Basics stores in Central Philadelphia. The stores had no service departments except for a service deli. All other meats, seafood, and baked goods were produced off-premises, which cut A&P's labor costs in these stores by more than 50%, by taking out the higher-paying jobs of a butcher and baker, and replacing them with more stock clerks and cashiers.
- Kohl's Food Stores: A&P acquired the Wisconsin-based Kohl's Food Stores in 1983 after closing A&P's large Chicago division in 1982. The first Kohl's opened in 1946; during the 1960s it expanded into department stores. In 1972, Kohl's was purchased by British American Tobacco, which decided to spin off the grocery stores to A&P a decade later. A&P closed Kohl's Food Stores in 2003.
- Dominion (Canada): In 1985, A&P acquired the Dominion chain in Canada, consisting of 92 supermarkets, 2 warehouses, and an office complex. Dominion was sold in 2005.
- Ultra Food & Drug / Miracle Mart / The Barn Markets (Canada): A&P acquired these two supermarket chains in Canada, and operated them until the chain's demise in the early 2000s, and operated out of the same store styles of its counterparts.
- The Food Emporium: Also in 1985, this 26-store New York City-based chain was acquired by A&P. Founded in 1919 as Daitch Crystal Dairies (later becoming Shopwell Supermarkets), the chain peaked at 103 stores in 1962. In the late 1970s and early 1980s, Shopwell closed many of its stores and changed its name to The Food Emporium to focus on affluent areas. Food Emporium stores were still in operation through A&P's liquidation; Key Food acquired The Food Emporium and four stores, along with the Super Fresh brand, in the liquidation, maintaining use of the brands today.
- Waldbaum's was acquired in 1986. The New York City-based chain was founded in 1904 and opened its first supermarket in 1951. The company quickly expanded from the city into Nassau and Suffolk counties, and later into Connecticut and Massachusetts. In the early 2000s, A&P operated 80 Waldbaum's in southernmost New York state (outside Manhattan). Many Waldbaum's were still in operation when the company started liquidation, mainly in the Long Island area.
- Farmer Jack was a 79-store supermarket chain based in Detroit; it was purchased by A&P in 1989. Farmer Jack started in 1924; in the mid-1950s its name was changed to Borman's. These stores were renamed Farmer Jack in the late 1960s. In 1987, Farmer Jack was depleted of cash in a lengthy strike; it was sold in 1989 to A&P for $76 million. Within five years, all A&Ps in the Detroit area were converted to Farmer Jack, as were some A&Ps in Virginia and South Carolina. By 2007, all Farmer Jack stores were sold or closed.
- Sav-A-Center: The Sav-A-Center name was first used for a chain of 20 supermarkets in the greater New Orleans, Louisiana, area. The division operated throughout Louisiana, and had two stores in Mississippi. In addition, the Sav-A-Center division included three regular A&P stores, one of which was a small "corner grocery" in the French Quarter of New Orleans that A&P had been operating since 1931. By August 2005, Sav-A-Center operated primarily in the Baton Rouge and New Orleans metropolitan areas, and along the Mississippi Gulf Coast. Many stores sustained damage as a result of Hurricane Katrina. Twenty-one stores reopened within a few months of the storm; two others following remodeling to repair flood damage. Five stores were closed permanently due to severe damage to the stores and surrounding areas. In April 2007, the chain exited the Baton Rouge area. On May 30, 2007, A&P confirmed that it was planning to exit the New Orleans area, and was seeking buyers for its 20 remaining Sav-A-Center stores. A&P said the company cited its decision to focus on its remaining operations in the Northeast, where it operated the majority of its stores. It was announced in September 2007 that the remaining Sav-A-Center stores would be sold to the locally owned Rouses chain. Rouses took over 16 Sav-A-Center stores, including the Mississippi stores and the French Quarter A&P, sold one to competing chain Breaux Mart, and closed the others.
- Pathmark was a large New York-area chain that was one of A&P's major competitors when it was acquired in 2007. Pathmark, originally known as Supermarkets General, was formed in 1956 as a subgroup of the Wakefern co-operative known as ShopRite. When Supermarkets General broke from ShopRite in 1968, it converted its 81 stores to Pathmark. By 1977, Pathmark started to build larger stores with pharmacies. To overcome a hostile takeover in 1987, Pathmark's management instituted a leveraged buyout of $2.7 billion that committed it to make large debt payments. In 2000, Pathmark entered bankruptcy; after it was reorganized, Yucaipa Holding purchased 40% of Pathmark for $150 million. At the time of its 2007 purchase by A&P, Pathmark operated 141 stores and had a capitalization of $634 million. Many Pathmark stores were still in operation when A&P began liquidation. The brand has been sold to Foodtown, and in April 2019, a revived Pathmark (owned by Allegiance Retail Services) had opened in the East Flatbush section of Brooklyn.

== Private brands ==
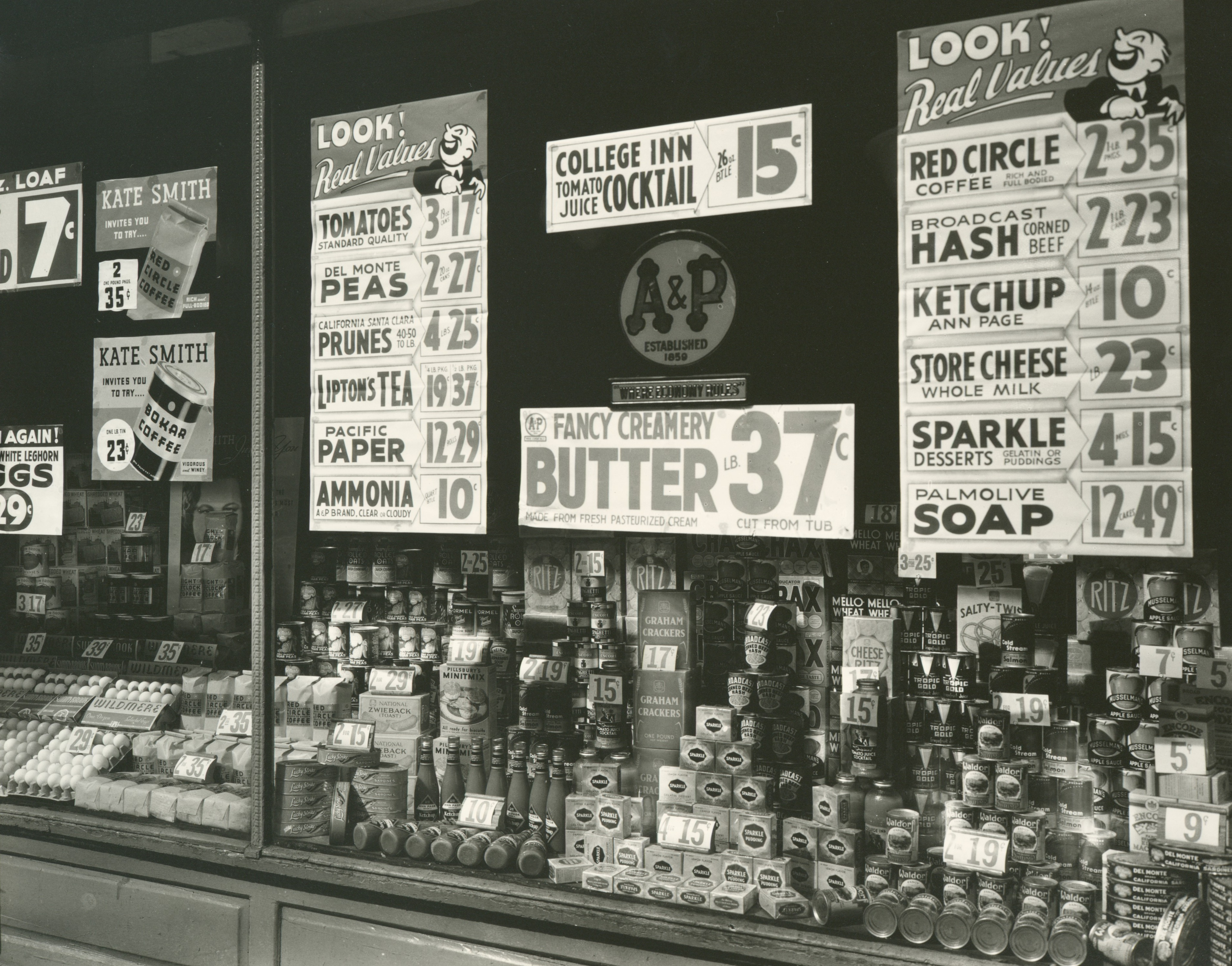
A&P, 246 Third Avenue, Manhattan, 1936. Note the prominent ads for A&P's private brands.

When A&P was founded, there were no branded food products, and retailers sold food commodities in bulk. In 1870, the company became among the first to sell a branded pre-packaged food product, introducing "Thea-Necter" brand tea. In 1885, the name "A&P" was introduced on baking powder containers. Also in the 1880s, the company adopted the name "Eight-O'Clock" for its coffee. When A&P moved its headquarters to Jersey City, New Jersey, in 1907, it included a bakery and coffee-roasting operation.

A&P's evolution into one of the country's largest food manufacturers was the result of the 1915 court decision in the Cream of Wheat litigation that upheld the right of a manufacturer to set retail prices. To keep prices down, A&P put emphasis on private label goods. By 1962, A&P operated 67 plants before consolidating many of them into the 1.5 million-square foot Horseheads facility, which was the largest food manufacturing plant in the world under one roof. In his 1952 book American Capitalism, John Kenneth Galbraith cited A&P's manufacturing strategy as a classic example of countervailing power that was a welcome alternative to state price controls.

As late as 1977, private label represented 25% of A&P's sales, with A&P manufactured products accounting for over 40% of this total. That year, A&P manufacturing reported sales of $750 million from its 23 plants(which by itself would have ranked A&P's manufacturing group at about number 350 in the Fortune 500).

Until the creation of a combined Manufacturing Group in 1975, the corporation's production operations were conducted by four separate divisions:

- Bakery (Grandmother's, Marvel, and Jane Parker): Until 1923, Jersey City was A&P's only bakery. A&P rapidly expanded the division until it was America's largest baker, with 37 plants. By 1977, the number of bakeries was reduced to seven; the division was closed during the 1981–82 restructuring. A Canadian baker continued to make Jane Parker cakes, but went bankrupt in 2014. Alex and Chris Ronacher took over the rights in 2016.
- Coffee (Eight O'Clock, Bokar, Red Circle): In 1919, A&P consolidated its coffee business into the "American Coffee Company", building roasting and grinding facilities. By 1977, A&P owned three coffee roasting plants, and one for canned coffee. The coffee operation survived the 1981–82 restructuring, not sold until 2003.
- Dairy: This division dates to 1922 when A&P purchased the White House Milk Company of West Bend, Wisconsin, to produce evaporated milk. At that time, grocers rarely sold fresh milk because of the lack of refrigeration. By 1977, the division operated three dairies, a cheese plant, and a dry milk plant.
- Grocery (Quaker Maid, Ann Page, Our Own Tea): In 1907, A&P opened a vegetable cannery. After World War I, A&P took advantage of the collapse of canned salmon prices to acquire canneries in Alaska. A&P then acquired facilities to produce a wide range of canned goods, frozen foods, nuts, tea bags, pasta, peanut butter, detergents, insecticides, gelatin, paper goods, and candy. A&P also operated a printing plant to produce labels and packaging for the other facilities, and promotional material for the stores. By 1977, A&P operated the Horseheads plant, plus six smaller facilities.

In the mid-1990s, A&P introduced a new simplified store brand called America's Choice, which would last until the chain's demise in 2015. (In Canada, the brand was called "Master Choice". This same branding was used for A&P's gourmet items in its U.S. stores.)

In 2008 and 2009, the corporation added the environmentally-sensitive Green Way brand, gourmet Food Emporium Trading Company brand, and low-cost Food Basics alternative.

== Woman's Day ==
What became Woman's Day was started by A&P in 1931, as a free leaflet with menus. In 1937, it was expanded into a magazine that was sold exclusively in A&P stores, for 5 cents. Circulation reached 3 million in 1944 and 4 million by 1958, when the magazine was sold to Fawcett Publications.

== In arts, entertainment, and media ==
- In the opening scene of the movie Breaking Away, Dennis Quaid sings, "When I die I want to be buried in the parking lot of a A&P".
- Gillian Darmody, played by Gretchen Mol, and Roy Phillips go to dinner with executives from A&P in season 4, episode 3 of Boardwalk Empire
- In Tim Burton's movie Big Eyes, Margaret Keane goes into a A&P & sees her paintings being sold
- The supermarket was mentioned in the Charles Manson song "Garbage Dump"
- In the Starz series Gaslit, a character says to Martha Mitchell (played by Julia Roberts), "I am going to the A&P".
- The 1981 song "Christmas Wrapping" by The Waitresses contains the lyric "A&P has provided me with the world's smallest turkey."
- From 1924 to 1936, A&P was the sponsor of the musical radio show The A&P Gypsies.
- A&P was also a long-time sponsor of Kate Smith's radio program; the popular singer became an A&P spokesperson, attending store openings around the country.
- In the 1951 Popeye short "Vacation With Play", the two squirrels in the cartoon originally spoke a transcribed radio announcement for an A&P advertisement on Jane Parker's Donuts. It can be heard only if slowing down the cartoon. Jane Parker is the name A&P used when selling their own line of baked goods such as doughnuts and cookies.
- The store is the setting for John Updike's 1961 short story, "A&P".
- A&P partnered with the Lifetime Network to produce the food-reality series Supermarket Superstar in 2013.
- A&P is mentioned in the 1988 movie, Scrooged. Bill Murray's character said "Look up A&P. If it's not under 'A', then look under 'P'" (A&P was supposed to bring over turkeys for the shelter).
- In the 1989 film Born on the Fourth of July, Ron Kovic works at the A&P supermarket early on, where his father is the manager of the store. He asks his high school crush to the prom while inside an A&P supermarket.
- In the 2001 book Good to Great, A&P was one of the companies examined against its rival Kroger.
- In 2007, A&P was the location where the music video for the rap song, "Produce Paradise," was filmed by brothers Mark and Matt D'Avella. A&P settled a lawsuit out of court.
- In the 2009 episode of Mad Men, "The Arrangements", a police officer notifies Betty Draper that her father has died, telling her: "He collapsed in line at the A&P."
- In the 2004 episode of Without a Trace, "Wannabe", Emily Levine says to a classmate, in reference to her (Emily) friend Brandee's mom writing her history report, "Well at least her mom doesn't work at the checkout counter at the A&P."
- In the 2022 adaptation of Don DeLillo's 1985 novel White Noise, A&P figured prominently as the character's grocery of choice, most dramatically at the beginning of the final credits.
- In the fifth season episode of Psych, "Not Even Close... Encounters", it is shown that Lassiter has a physical "crap list". One person on the list is "Check out Girl @ the A&P", but that may be an old grudge as there were no A&Ps in California anymore at the time of the episode's airing.

== See also ==
- List of supermarket chains in the United States
- Retail apocalypse
- List of retailers affected by the retail apocalypse
