= Raus =

Raus may refer to:

- Erhard Raus (1889–1956), Austrian colonel general in the German Wehrmacht during World War II
- Raus, a 2nd century king of the Hasdingi Vandals allied with the Roman Empire
- Raus (Birs), Switzerland, a river
