= Rouses =

U.S. supermarket chain

Rouses Markets
- Type: Private
- Industry: Retail (Supermarket)
- Founded: City Produce Company; 1923; 103 years ago Rouses Markets; 1960; 66 years ago
- Founders: J.P. Rouse (City Produce Company); Anthony J. Rouse (Founder of Rouses Markets)
- Headquarters: Thibodaux, Louisiana, U.S.
- Number of locations: 66 (2023)
- Area served: Louisiana, Alabama & Mississippi
- Key people: Donald Rouse Sr.; Donny Rouse Jr.; Allison Rouse Royster; Tommy Rouse
- Products: Bakery, dairy, deli, frozen foods, general grocery, meat, pharmacy, produce, seafood, snacks
- Revenue: ▲$1.5 billion (2023)
- Number of employees: 7,000 (2023)
- Website: www.rouses.com

Rouses Markets is an American grocery supermarket chain headquartered in Thibodaux, Louisiana.

== History ==
The company had its start as the City Produce Company, founded in Thibodaux, Louisiana by J. P. Rouse in 1923, which bought produce from local farmers in the Terrebonne and Lafourche Parishes, as well as the French Market in New Orleans, and shipped them around the United States.

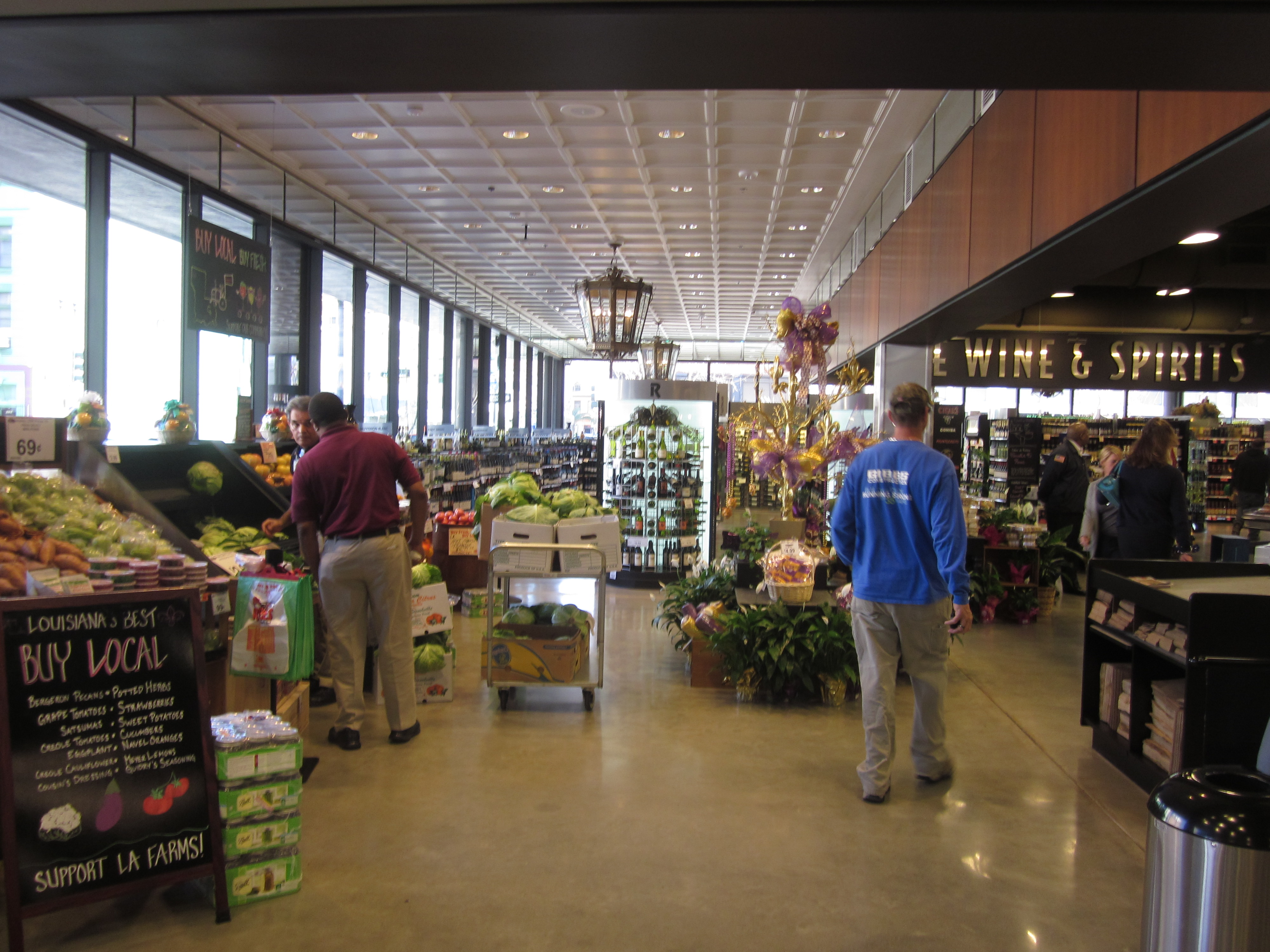
Interior of Rouses Market in New Orleans Central Business District, 2011.

In 1960, Anthony Rouse Sr. (son of J. P. Rouse) and his cousin, Ciro DiMarco, opened a 7,000-square-foot (650 m^{2}) grocery store in Houma, Louisiana.

In the 1970s, Ciro decided to exit the business and sold his portion of the business to Anthony's son, Ryan Rouse. In the late 1970s Anthony's son Tommy also joined the business. Throughout the 1970s, the company operated stores in Houma, Raceland and the Rouses’ hometown of Thibodaux. During the 1980s, the company opened more new stores in South Louisiana, in the communities of Lockport, Cut Off and Morgan City.

Rouses opened its first store in Metairie in 1995 and was then the largest independent grocer in Louisiana.

In 2003, Rouses opened a 54,000-square-foot (5,000 m^{2}) store in Covington. That store was followed by other St. Tammany Parish locations in Mandeville in 2005 and Slidell in 2006.

In 2007, two years after hurricanes Katrina and Rita devastated the New Orleans area, Rouses acquired A&P’s Southern Division of 17 Sav-A-Center stores, effectively doubling the company in size, and giving the company its first stores in the city of New Orleans and in Mississippi. In 2008, Rouses acquired two additional stores in Mississippi.

In January 2009, Rouses opened a newly constructed store in Youngsville, Louisiana, a community in the Lafayette area. This location was the first in the Acadiana region for the chain, its westernmost store, and the biggest grand opening event in company history.

In 2010, the company acquired a store in Mathews, Louisiana which was previously operated by Winn-Dixie. In 2011, Rouses opened a 40,000-square-foot full service grocery store in the Central Business District of New Orleans, ending 45 years without.

In 2013, Rouses expanded into Alabama by taking ownership of six Belle Foods stores in the Mobile area. The first of those stores opened in Theodore, Alabama on February 9, 2014.

In 2016, Rouses acquired LeBlanc's Food Stores, expanding its presence in the metro Baton Rouge area with 9 additional locations. All LeBlanc's Food Stores were rebranded as Rouses Markets.

In 2021, Steve Galtier, the former head of Human Resources for Rouses, posted pictures on social media of himself and Donald Rouse Sr., his life partner and former boss, attending the pro-Trump rally in Washington D.C. just before the storming on the US Capitol Building. Although Rouse Sr. claims not to have taken part in the insurrection, many Rouses Market customers called for a boycott of their stores.

== Recognition ==
- 2018 The Shelby Report of the Southeast's Retailer of the Year
- 2013 The 8 Best Regional Supermarket Chains in America
- 2010 New Orleans Magazine's Best Grocery Store/Deli
- 2009 Gambit Best Supermarket
- 2009 Sophisticated Woman's Best Supermarket
- 2009 Daily Comet's Best Grocery Store in Lafourche Parish
- 2009 Houma Courier's Best Grocery Store in Terrebonne Parish
- 2009 Sophisticated Woman's Best Supermarket
- 2009 Jefferson Life's Best Supermarket
- 2009 Louisiana Life's Best Places to Work
- 2009 AOL's Best Grocery Stores
- 2008 Gambit Best Supermarket
- 2008 Sophisticated Woman's Best Supermarket
- 2007 Association for Corporate Growth Louisiana Deal of the Year
- 2007 Sophisticated Woman's Best Supermarket
- 2007 Gambit Best Neighborhood Grocery on the North Shore
- 2006 Sophisticated Woman's Best Supermarket
- 2006 Progressive Grocer Store of the Month
- 2006 Thibodaux Chamber of Commerce Business of the Year
- 2005 Gambit Best Neighborhood Grocery on the North Shore
- 2005 St. Tammany West Chamber of Commerce Business Appreciation Award – Largest Expansion
- 2004 National Grocers Association Advertising Award Best Commercials
- 2004 National Grocers Association Advertising Award Best Grand Opening Campaign
- 2004 Addy Award Best Grocery Store Commercials
- 2003 Addy Award Best Grocery Store Commercials
- 1999 Food People of the Year (Donald)
- 1995 National Grocers Association Award - Fast Bagger
- 1984 Progressive Grocer Store of the Month
