= Prowse (surname) =

Prowse is a surname. Notable people with the surname include:

- Albert Prowse (1858–1925), Canadian political figure
- Andrew Prowse (fl. 1980s–present), Australian film and TV director
- Benjamin Charles Prowse (1862–1930), Canadian political figure
- Charles Bertie Prowse (1869–1916), British Army officer
- Daniel Woodley Prowse (1834–1914), Canadian political figure
- David Prowse (1935–2020), British athlete and actor
- David Prowse (politician) (born 1941), Australian political figure
- Edgar Prowse (1905–1977), Australian political figure
- George Prowse (1896–1918), British sailor who won a Victoria Cross in World War I
- Heydon Prowse (born 1981), British journalist and actor
- Ian Prowse (fl. 1990s–present), British musician
- James Harper Prowse (1913–1976), Canadian political figure
- Jane Prowse (fl. 1990s–present), US playwright and author
- John Prowse (1871–1944), Australian political figure
- Juliet Prowse (1936–1996), South African-American dancer and actress
- Lemuel E. Prowse (1858–1925), Canadian political figure
- Philip Prowse (born 1937), Scottish theatre director
- Robert Henry Prowse (1828–1924), Canadian political figure
- Samuel Prowse (1835–1902), Canadian political figure
- Thomas Prowse (MP), MP for Somerset from 1740 to 1767
- Thomas William Lemuel Prowse (1888–1973), Canadian political figure
- William Prowse (1752–1826), British naval officer
- William Jeffrey Prowse (1839–1870), British author

Fictional characters:

- Emily Prowse, character in the television series Jericho
- Jonah Prowse, character in the television series Jericho
