= Kohl's Food Stores =

Grocery store chain

Kohl’s Food Stores
- Type: Subsidiary
- Industry: Retail (grocery)
- Founded: 1946; 80 years ago in Milwaukee, Wisconsin, U.S.
- Founder: Maxwell Kohl
- Defunct: 2003; 23 years ago
- Headquarters: Milwaukee, Wisconsin, U.S.
- Area served: Wisconsin
- Parent: Independent (1946–1972); British American Tobacco (1972–1982); A&P (1982–2003)
- Website: Archived official website at the Wayback Machine (archived 2003-06-19)

Kohl's Food Stores was a Milwaukee-area grocery store chain and subsidiary of The Great Atlantic and Pacific Tea Company. Kohl’s Food Stores distribution center was located in Waukesha, while its management offices were located in Milwaukee, Wisconsin.

The first location opened in 1946. The last remaining locations closed in 2003.

== History ==
=== Early history ===
Maxwell Kohl, who had operated traditional grocery stores since 1927, built his first supermarket in 1946, the first in what would become a southeastern Wisconsin chain known as Kohl's Food Stores. In September 1962, after building Kohl's Food Stores into the largest supermarket chain in the Milwaukee area, Kohl opened his first department store in Brookfield, Wisconsin. He positioned Kohl's between the higher-end department stores and the discounters, selling everything from candy to engine oil to sporting equipment.

=== Sale to A&P and closure ===
In 1972, the British American Tobacco Company's U.S. retail division, Batus Inc., bought a controlling interest in Kohl's Corporation, which at the time operated 50 grocery stores, six department stores, three drug stores, and three liquor stores. The Kohl family, led by Allen Kohl and Herb Kohl, continued to manage the company. Herb Kohl left the management in 1979, eventually becoming a United States senator and owner of the Milwaukee Bucks. The firm then expanded Kohl's presence from 10 to 39 stores in Wisconsin. The grocery stores were sold to A&P in 1983, operating under the name Kohl's Food Store, and later Kohl's Food Emporium. In February 2003, A&P put the Kohl's Food Stores up for sale, as part of an effort to reduce debt. That same year, A&P closed all Kohl's Food Stores locations and the Kohl family left remaining management. Jewel was rumored to buy Kohl's, but that deal fell through. The Madison area stores were sold to Roundy's.

== See also ==
- Kohl's
