= Rouse Islands =

Island group in Holme Bay, Antarctica

- Location within Antarctica

Geography
- Location: Antarctica
- Coordinates: 67°34′48″S 62°57′00″E
- Highest elevation: 28 m (92 ft)

Administration
- Administered under the Antarctic Treaty System

Demographics
- Population: Uninhabited

The Rouse Islands or Rouse Rocks are a small group of islands in the eastern part of Holme Bay in Antarctica, fringing the coast of Mac Robertson Land close south of Welch Island. The Rouse Islands have an elevation of 28 m (92 ft). The Rouse Islands were discovered on February 13, 1931, by the British Australian and New Zealand Antarctic Research Expedition (BANZARE) under Sir Douglas Mawson, who named them for E. J. Rouse of Sydney, who assisted the expedition with photographic equipment. The Rouse Islands have since been found to be islands.

== See also ==
- Composite Antarctic Gazetteer
- List of Antarctic islands south of 60° S
- SCAR
- Territorial claims in Antarctica
