= Hartford (surname) =

Origin
- Meaning: deer crossing
- Region of origin: United Kingdom (England, Ireland, Scotland)

Hartford is a surname that means 'the place where deer cross'.

== People ==
- Asa Hartford (born 1950) Scottish footballer
- Dee Hartford (1928–2018), American television actress
- George Huntington Hartford (1833–1917), co-founder of The Great Atlantic & Pacific Tea Company
- George Ludlum Hartford (1864–1957), heir to The Great Atlantic & Pacific Tea Company and co-founder of the John A. Hartford Foundation
- Huntington Hartford (1911–2008), heir to The Great Atlantic & Pacific Tea Company fortune and developer of Paradise Island, Bahamas
- Jeff Hartford, Canadian DJ and producer
- John Hartford (1937–2001), American country/bluegrass musician
- John Augustine Hartford (1872–1951), heir to The Great Atlantic & Pacific Tea Company and co-founder of the John A. Hartford Foundation
- Malik Hartford (born 2005), American football player

== Fictional characters ==
- Andrew Hartford, in the television series Power Rangers Operation Overdrive
- Walter "Doc" Hartford, from The Adventures of the Galaxy Rangers
