= John Hartford House =

Historic house in New York, United States

- John A. Hartford House
- U.S. National Register of Historic Places
- U.S. National Historic Landmark
- New York State Register of Historic Places
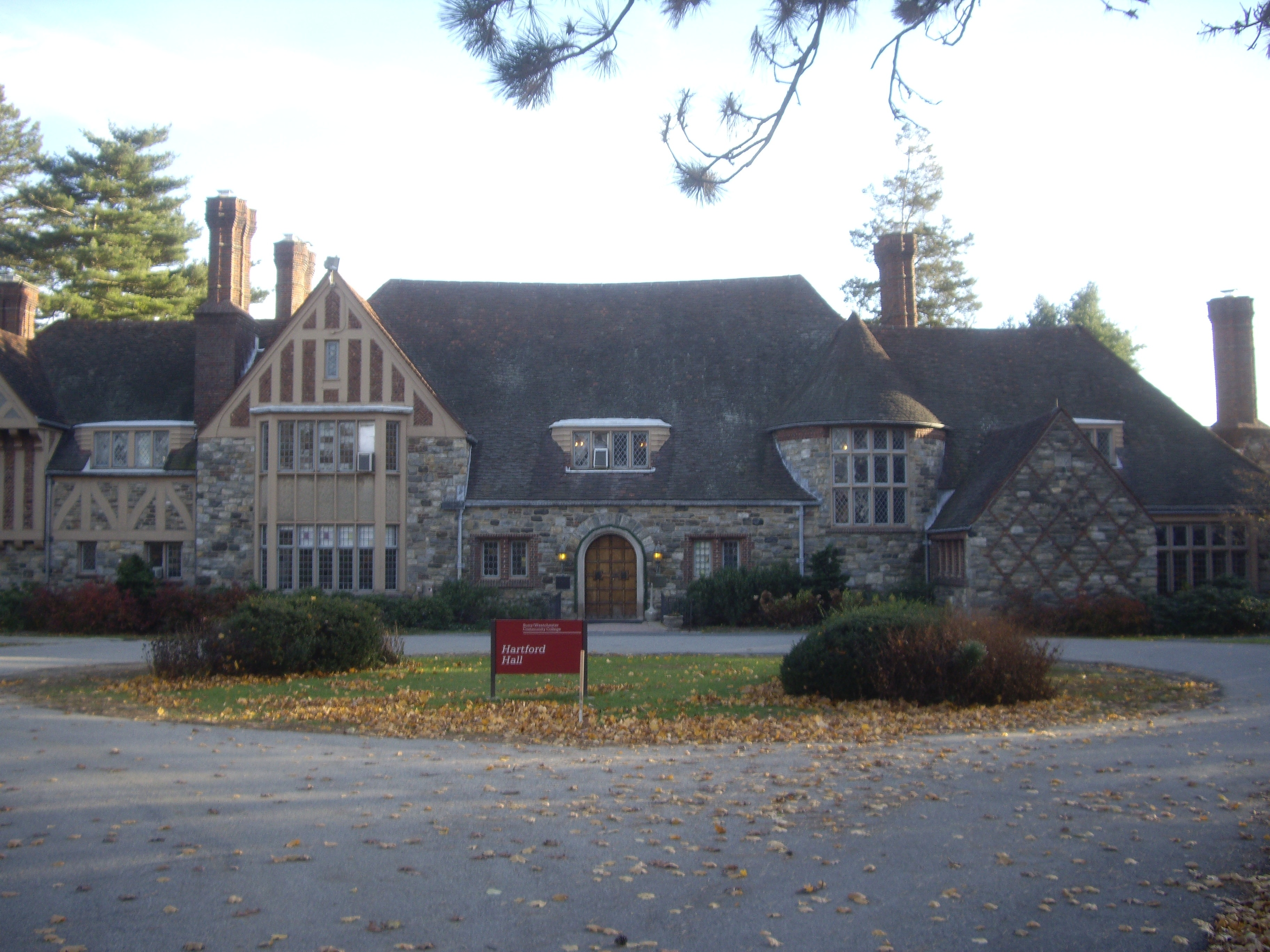

- Location within New York Location within the United States
- Location: Westchester Community College
- Nearest city: Valhalla, New York
- Coordinates: 41°4′8″N 73°47′25″W
- Area: 10 acres (4.0 ha)
- Built: 1930
- Architect: Mann & MacNeille
- Architectural style: Tudor Revival
- NRHP reference No.: 77000987
- NYSRHP No.: 11904.000145

Significant dates
- Added to NRHP: December 22, 1977
- Designated NHL: December 22, 1977
- Designated NYSRHP: June 23, 1980

The John A. Hartford House, now known as Hartford Hall, is a historic house on the campus of Westchester Community College in Valhalla, New York, U.S. It was built in 1930–32 by John A. Hartford (1872–1951), company president of the Great Atlantic and Pacific Tea Company (A&P). The house was designated a National Historic Landmark in 1977 for its association with Hartford, who oversaw the rise of A&P into the nation's first national chain grocer. The building now houses the office of the college president, among other uses.

== Description and history ==
The John A. Hartford House stands on the campus of Westchester Community College, located west of the village of Valhalla. The college is located on a portion of the original Hartford country estate. The house is a large Tudor Revival structure, designed by Mann and MacNeille, an architecture firm from New York City, and completed in 1932. It is 2 1/2 stories in height, built mainly out of fieldstone and covered by a slate hip roof. The stone is laid in rough courses, with wooden beams interrupting some of them. Red brick chimneys with corbelled tops dot the structure. The interior is finished with rich woodwork, marble, and plasterwork. Despite the building's adaptation to institutional use, it retains some feeling of a home, and still includes some of John Hartford's furnishings.

John Hartford purchased over 300 acres (120 ha) of land in 1930 from Joseph Daly, a New York lawyer who had used the estate for breeding horses. Hartford had the house built, along with other trappings of a country estate, including a nine-hole golf course. Of Hartford's estate buildings, only the house and a greenhouse survive. Hartford is considered by historians of business to be the principal force in the expansion of A&P to national scope; the company was founded in 1859, but its expansion took place in between 1910 and 1930, with Hartford and his brother George at the corporate helm.

After Hartford died in 1951, the property was controlled by the John A. Hartford Foundation, which leased it to Yale University for use in a forestry program. In 1957, the foundation sold the property to the county at a discounted price, for use as an educational facility. The county had been seeking a home for the community college, whose administration it had taken over from the state.

== See also ==
- List of National Historic Landmarks in New York
- National Register of Historic Places listings in northern Westchester County, New York
