= George Hartford =

George Hartford may refer to:

- George Huntington Hartford (1833–1917), American businessman
- George Ludlum Hartford (1864–1957), son and successor of George Huntington Hartford
- Huntington Hartford (George Huntington Hartford II, 1911–2008), grandson of George Huntington Hartford
