= Murphy Ranch =

Abandoned ranch in Los Angeles

Coordinates: 34.072°N 118.513°W

Murphy Ranch is an abandoned ranch in Rustic Canyon in the Santa Monica Mountains, built in the 1930s by Winona and Norman Stevens. A long-running urban legend claims the ranch was built to serve as a Nazi enclave.

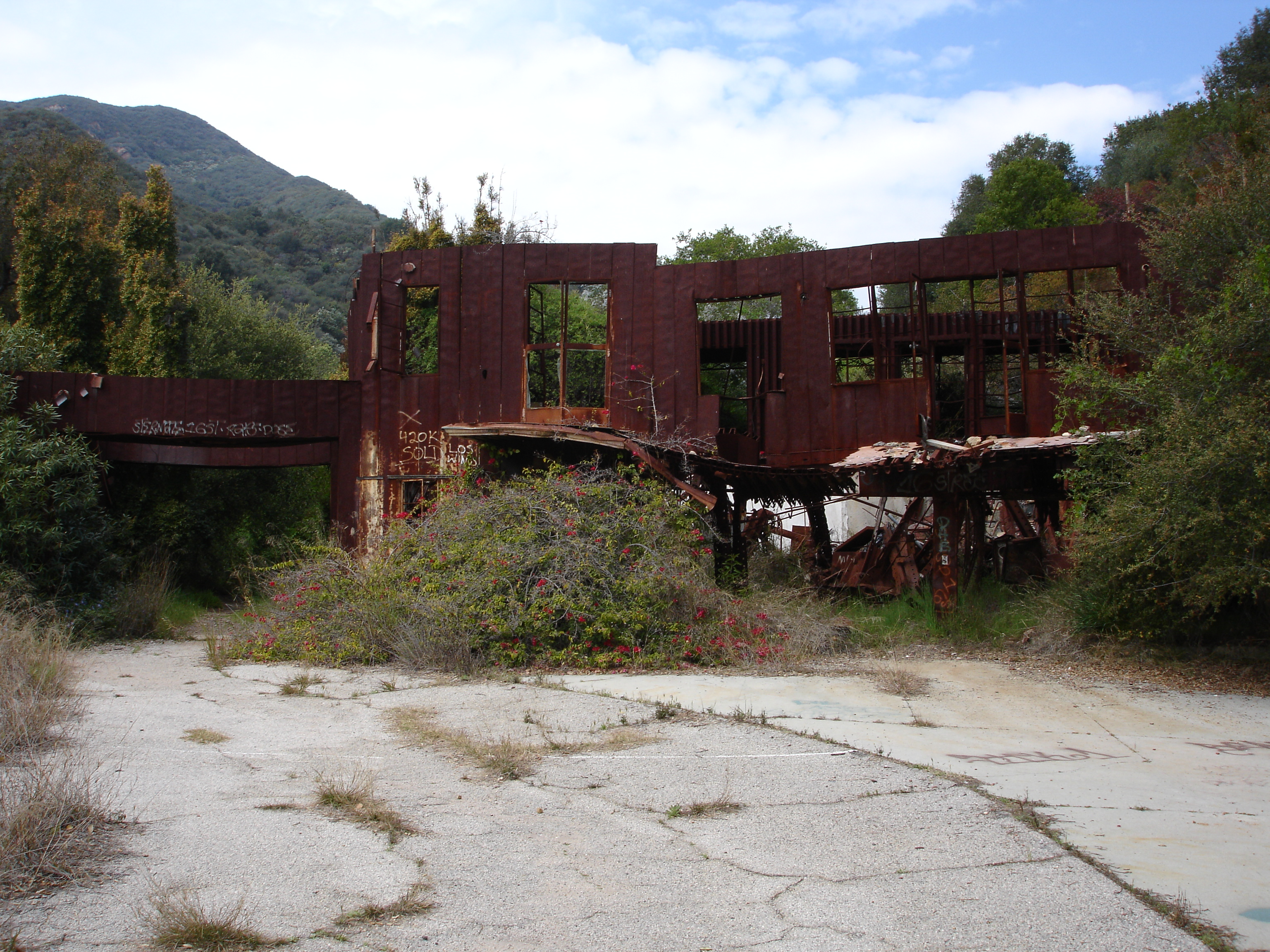
The Murphy Ranch house in Los Angeles, 2006

From 1950-1965, the property was owned by the Huntington Hartford Foundation, which operated it as an artists' retreat.

The site, now abandoned and in a state of disrepair, is currently owned by the city of Los Angeles.

== History ==
Jessie M. Murphy purchased 41 acres (17 ha) of the Lawes property in Rustic Canyon in the Santa Monica Mountains in the early 1930s. This land became known as Murphy Ranch. Winona and Norman Stevens purchased it from Jessie Murphy in 1933 or 1934. Winona Bassett Stevens was a wealthy heiress, inheriting a fortune amassed by Arthur J. Bassett in the Chicago steel industry. A Rasputin-like spiritual healer named Conrad Anderson convinced Winona to purchase the Murphy property as a survival retreat, accurately claiming that a great war was coming.

Construction began in 1934. Canyon hillsides were terraced, and 8 long concrete staircases were built into the side of the canyon to maintain orchard trees on the terraces. A good well was drilled, and a 300,000-gallon water tank and another smaller tank were added to be filled from the well. A watering system was built to water the trees in the terraces. A concrete building to house two large diesel generators was constructed to provide electricity for the property's needs. The entire 41 acres were chain-link fenced at the perimeter, with barbed wire strands across the top. It appears that this fence is still there today. An electric gate at the property entrance had an intercom wired to the main house, from which the gate could be operated remotely. A strong steel house was built to serve as a garage in the original plan. Several large mansions were planned, one by architect Paul Williams, a well-known African American architect in the Southern California area. However, only the steel building and two other small houses were built by the time the Stevens family moved in, which was November 26, 1942 - Thanksgiving Day.

The family consisted of Norman and Winona Stevens and their four children: Dale, Robin, Carlile, and Theanne. Conrad Anderson had a house on the property, and three of his followers also moved to the property: Ilsa Reynolds, Josephine Spotts, and Florence Kamp. All but Conrad Anderson worked daily on the property, tending livestock and chickens, maintaining the orchards, milking cows, raising hay and other crops, etc. During WWII, Norman managed quality control for carrier-based fighter planes at Douglas Aircraft. His oldest son Dale enlisted in the army and fought in Europe under General Patton. His second son Robin went to Asia as part of the war effort in the militarized merchant marine. The family moved out in 1945, after the war ended. The Stevens moved to a property they bought in Ramona. Anderson had died in 1943. In 1949, they sold the property to Huntington Hartford for $100,000. This was a huge loss for the Stevenses, as they had put $900,000 into the property.

Hartford also bought the adjacent Josepho property for a total of 154 acres (62 ha). He set it all up as a retreat for artists and writers, who would be accepted to the retreat for six-month periods, all expenses paid for by Hartford. Henry Miller, Edward Hopper, and Christopher Isherwood were among those who were awarded these stays. The art colony ran until 1965 when Hartford ran out of money. He sold it that year to Jack Morehart, who owned Pacific Ocean Park. Morehart later sold 86.6 acres (35.0 ha) of the property, including Murphy Ranch, to the city of Los Angeles in 1972. He donated half and received $478,000 for the other half. It remains a Los Angeles city park to this day (2024). The Mandeville Canyon fire of 1978 destroyed most of the structures. The large water tank, gate, and remains of the steel building were torn down in 2016, mainly for safety. The concrete powerhouse is the only structure left standing on the Murphy Ranch portion of the property. It is thoroughly painted over by graffiti, which is continually updated. All entryways have been sealed.

=== Urban legend ===
John Vincent was a UCLA music professor who helped Huntington Hartford with the purchase of Murphy Ranch from the Stevens family and later managed the art colony. He told the story that the Stevens family had bought Murphy Ranch at the urging of a German spy called "Herr Schmidt". In 1975, Vincent produced an affidavit of the story for local historian, Betty Lou Young, who was writing a book about Pacific Palisades. In the affidavit, he said that the Stevens family (misspelled as 'Stephens'), built out the property based on National Socialist ideals. Young included the story in her book. Her son Randy Young shared the story over the years.

A 1990 Los Angeles Times article about the ranch featured Randy Young sharing his beliefs about the ranch's history. He speculated that "Jesse Murphy" was an assumed name used by Norman and Winona Stevens. Young also claimed that neighbors had reported paramilitary activities on the ranch and that federal agents raided the ranch the day after Pearl Harbor, arresting Herr Schmidt and finding a powerful shortwave radio used for communicating with Germany. No evidence, such as newspaper articles, can be found for any of these claims.

In his 2017 book Hitler in Los Angeles: How Jews Foiled Nazi Plots Against Hollywood and America, Steven Joseph Ross repeated some of Randy Young's claims.

Stanton Stevens, grandson of Norman and Winona Stevens, responded to the urban legend with his 2023 book, The True Story of Murphy Ranch.

== In popular culture ==
The ruins of Murphy Ranch are featured in Richard Kadrey's Sandman Slim series novel Killing Pretty.

Murphy Ranch was the featured location of the radio play "Annexing the Palisades" written in 2020 by Alex Goldberg. The play is set in 1939 and is about the construction of the house and its supposed Nazi ties.
