= Josephine Hartford Bryce =

American socialite (1903–1992)

- Born: Marie Josephine Hartford; 1903; New Jersey, U.S.
- Died: June 8, 1992 (aged 88); New York City, New York, U.S.
- Spouse(s): Charles Oliver O'Donnell (1923–1930); Vadim S. Makaroff (1931-1937); Barclay Kountze Douglas (1937–); John Felix "Ivar" Charles Bryce (1950–1985, his death)
- Children: Nuala O'Donnell Pell, Columbus O'Donnell
- Parents: Edward V. Hartford (father); Princess Henrietta Guerard Pollitzer Hartford Pignatelli (mother)
- Relatives: Huntington Hartford (brother), George Huntington Hartford (grandfather), Claiborne Pell (son-in-law)
- Family: Hartford family

Marie Josephine "JoJo" Hartford O'Donnell Makaroff Douglas Bryce (1903 – June 8, 1992) was an American heiress, thoroughbred racehorse owner and socialite from New York. She was the daughter of Edward V. Hartford, an inventor and heir to the A&P grocery store fortune.

== Biography ==
Marie Josephine "JoJo" Hartford was born in 1903. She was the first child born to Edward V. Hartford and his wife Henrietta Guerard Pollitzer. She was the granddaughter to George Huntington Hartford, who made his fortune leading the Great Atlantic & Pacific Tea Company. JoJo's parents were said to live ostentatiously compared to others in the Hartford family. Unlike his brothers, Edward V did not work for A&P, choosing to live as a gentleman. The couple travelled extensively, maintaining a plantation in South Carolina, a home on Fifth Avenue, and a weekend estate in New Jersey.

JoJo's father Edward died in 1922. Upon her father's death, his fortune would pass to JoJo, her brother Huntington and their mother Henrietta.

=== C. Oliver O'Donnell ===
After her father's death, the family began to spend their summers in Newport, Rhode Island. JoJo Hartford said her mother "always believed, as Southerners do, that she was terribly grand", and bought one of Newport's most grand oceanside estates. There, JoJo Hartford met her first husband Charles Oliver O'Donnell, a grandson of Columbus O'Donnell and heir to the Baltimore and Ohio Railroad fortune. The pair married in 1923 and had two children, Nuala and Columbus. The couple divorced in 1931; he sued her for cruelty.

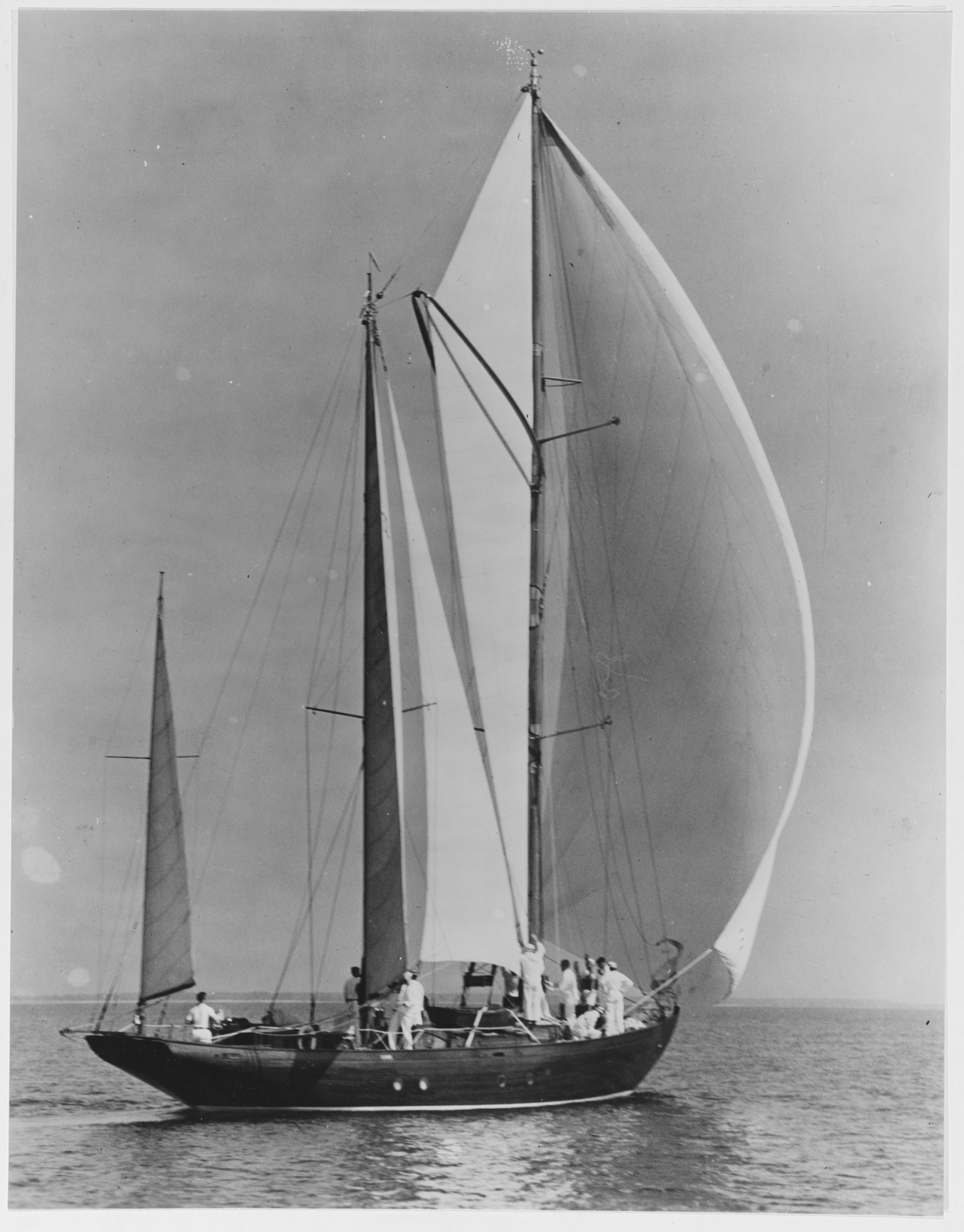
USS Vamarie after being transferred to the U.S. Naval Academy.

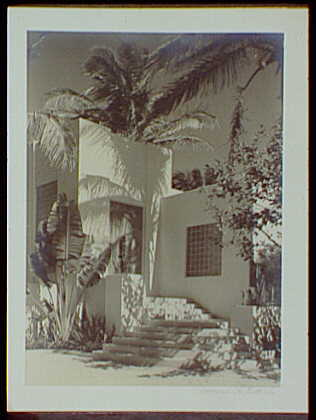
The Reef, designed by Maurice Fatio and built at 702 North County Road in Palm Beach for the Makaroffs in 1936. It was designated as a landmark in 1990.

=== Vadim Stefan Makaroff ===
In 1931, JoJo married Vadim S. Makaroff in Paris, France. Makaroff was the son of Russian admiral Stepan Makarov, keen yachtsman and a businessman known as the "Caviar King". Upon their marriage, Makaroff commissioned the Vamarie, a 75-foot ketch. Vadim Makaroff would set several sailing records in the yacht.

In 1935, she was named by Fortune magazine to their roster of the richest U.S. women. The description of Makaroffs stated:

"Their life is one of very luxurious sport, from a ski lodge in Canada, their racing yacht the Vamarie, on to the tennis courts under a powerfully lighted glass ceiling in their lavish Long Island estate. She is the very pattern of a young and terrifically wealthy woman, constantly entertaining, spending, taking up new diversions, traveling and like other wealthy women- constantly afraid that people are after her money."

From 1935 to 1936, JoJo and Vadim commissioned architect Maurice Fatio to design and build The Reef, an international style estate on Palm Beach. Mrs. Makaroff commissioned her friend Marjorie Oelrichs to design the interior. The estate went on to win a gold medal and named "the most modern house in America" at the 1937 Paris International Exhibition. The Makaroffs would later divorce and donate the Vamarie to the United States Naval Academy.

=== Barclay Kountze Douglas ===
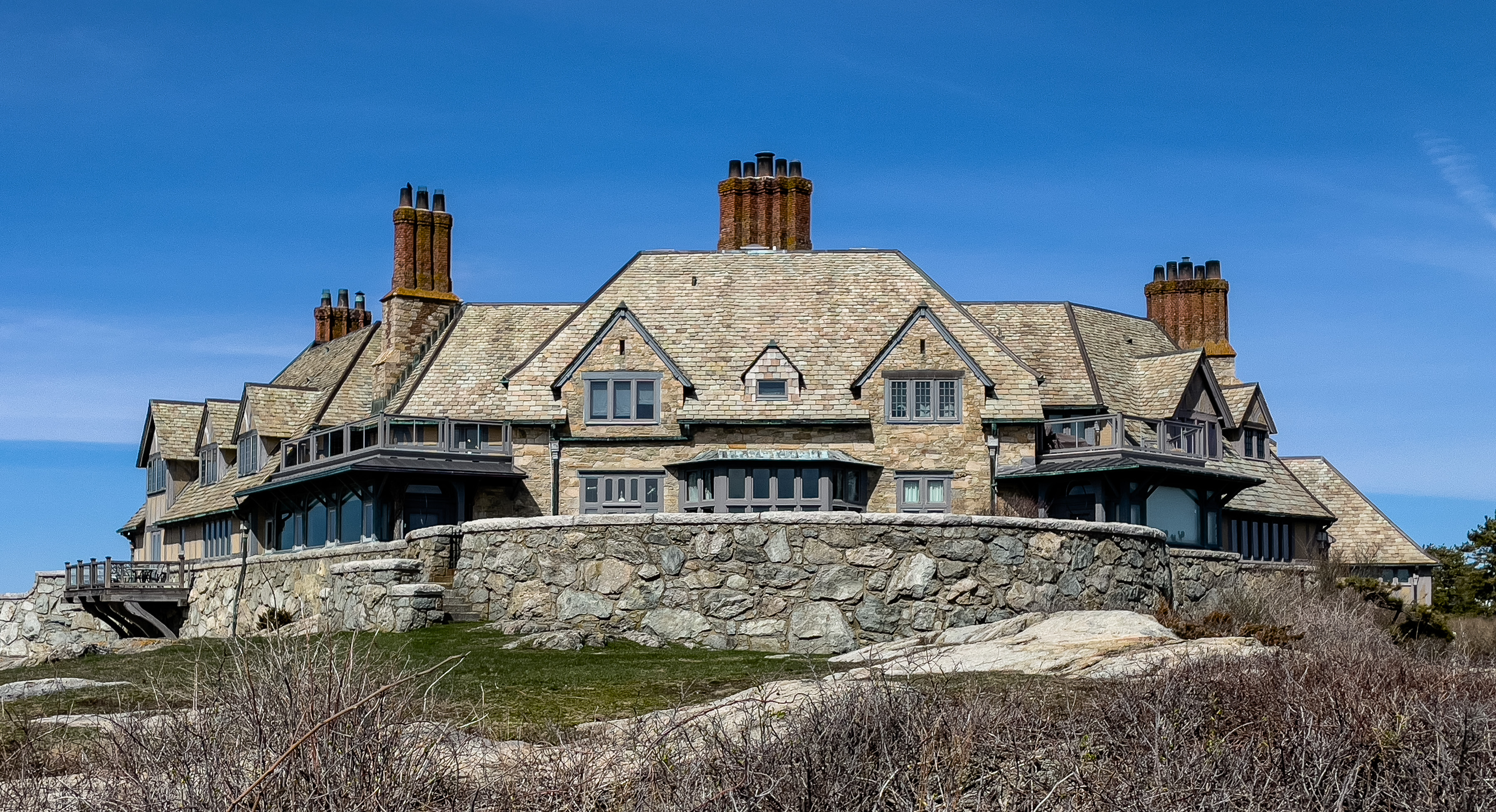
The Waves mansion in Newport, Rhode Island, home to Mr. and Mrs. Barclay Douglas

On March 31, 1937, JoJo Makaroff married Barclay Kountze Douglas, a sportsman, aviator and former yachtsman of the Vamarie. With her third husband, JoJo Douglas became heavily involved in thoroughbred racing, as well as aviation. In 1938, she received her pilot's license and bought her first plane. JoJo Douglas would sell The Reef at a loss. The couple moved to Newport, Rhode Island, where they purchased The Waves estate, alternatively known as the John Russell Pope House in 1937. JoJo and Barclay would later divorce.

=== Mill River Stable ===
JoJo Douglas's racing stable, Mill River, had several notable horses throughout the 1940s. Her racing colors were orange and red. Some of Douglas's top horses included Miss Grillo (the namesake of the Miss Grillo Stakes), Eurasian and Chop Chop. In 1942, Mill River's Fair Call placed seventh in that year's Kentucky Derby. In March 1944, Mill River led the nominations for that year's Kentucky Derby, with five horses. None ultimately would run. In 1947, her horse Secnav contested the Preakness Stakes, finishing seventh.

=== Ivar Bryce ===
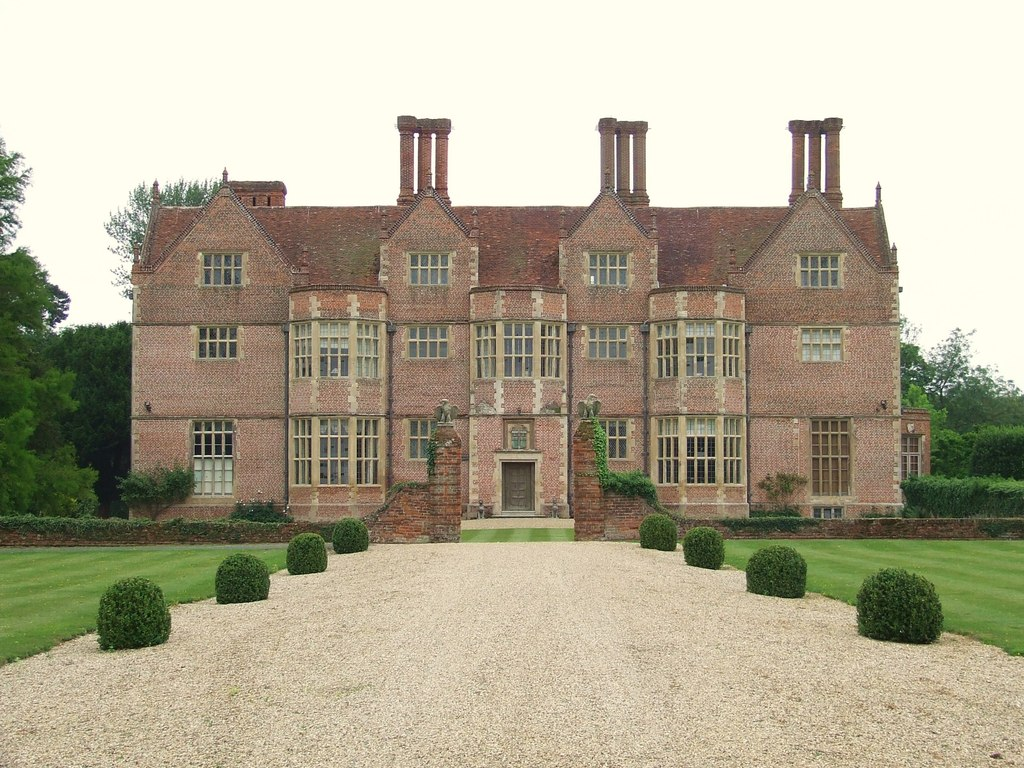
Moyns Park estate, Essex, England

In 1950, JoJo Douglas married her fourth husband, Englishman John Felix "Ivar" Charles Bryce, the grandson of John Pablo Bryce. Ivar Bryce was a former British intelligence officer, co-owner of the North American Newspaper Alliance and heir to Moyns Park. The couple would spend considerable time in England where JoJo worked to restore the property, and where they would travel to and host parties across Europe as members of the jet set. While in Europe, JoJo Bryce moved many of her racing horses to England to race.

When not residing in England, JoJo and Ivar Bryce split their time between properties in Vermont, New York, Acapulco, Newport and "Xanadu", an estate on New Providence Island, The Bahamas. JoJo's brother, Huntington Hartford, owned nearby Paradise Island. Ivar and JoJo Bryce regularly hosted their close friend Ian Fleming, who based elements of his character Felix Leiter on Ivar. Their lavish properties were said to have inspired several of the settings of his James Bond novels. On a visit to the Bryces' Black Hole Hollow Farm in Vermont, JoJo Bryce reportedly encouraged Fleming to take a trip to Saratoga Springs to attend the Travers States. The racetrack at Saratoga would later appear in Diamonds Are Forever.

JoJo's husband Ivar died in 1985, and she would die at home in New York on June 8, 1992, at the age of 88.
