= Ruth Shaw Wylie =

American composer and music educator

Ruth Shaw Wylie (24 June 1916 – 30 January 1989) was a U.S.-born composer and music educator. She described herself as “a fairly typical Midwestern composer,” pursuing musical and aesthetic excellence but not attracting much national attention: “All good and worthy creative acts do not take place in New York City,” she wrote in 1962, “although most good and worthy rewards for creative acts do emanate from there; and if we can’t all be on hand to reap these enticing rewards we can take solace in the fact that we are performing good deeds elsewhere.” She was among the many twentieth-century American composers whose work contributed to the recognition of American “serious” music as a distinct genre.

== Biography ==
Ruth Shaw Wylie was born in Cincinnati, Ohio and grew up in Detroit, Michigan, where she received her undergraduate degree and a master's degree in music composition at Wayne State University (WSU). In 1939 she entered the doctoral program in music composition at the Eastman School of Music where she studied with Bernard Rogers and Howard Hanson. She was awarded the PhD in 1943 and took a position teaching at the University of Missouri where she stayed until 1949. In the summer of 1947 she studied with Arthur Honegger, Samuel Barber, and Aaron Copland at the Berkshire Music Center at Tanglewood. She returned to Detroit to teach at WSU where she remained for twenty years, retiring from teaching as Professor Emerita in 1969. She moved to Salt Lake City, Utah, and then to Estes Park, Colorado in 1973, and continued composing.

At WSU Wylie taught music theory and composition and served as head of composition; during one year she served as interim chair of the music department. In the early 1960s she founded, directed, and performed with the WSU Improvisation Chamber Ensemble; she continued to count her work with group improvisation as among her most significant contributions. She received a number of awards, including "Friends of Harvey Gaul" and the ASCAP Standard Award. Wylie was a resident fellow at the Huntington Hartford Foundation (1953–54) and at the MacDowell Colony (1954 and 1956). She composed The Long Look Home for the Michigan Chamber Orchestra for a Bicentennial Celebration commission from the Michigan Council for the Arts.

Wylie published articles on music in the Journal of Aesthetics and Art Criticism, in the Detroit journal Criticism, and elsewhere.

== Compositions ==
Wylie composed about 60 titles. Her earlier works—from the 1940s into the 1960s—include sonatas, symphonies, string quartets, and didactic pieces for piano; in these works she develops her own interpretation of American neoclassicism. Examples are Five Madrigals from William Blake (1950); Concerto Grosso for string orchestra and seven solo woodwinds (1952); String Quartet No. 3 (1954), completed during a Huntington Hartford Foundation residency; Sonata for Viola and Piano (1954), completed at the MacDowell Colony; and Sonata for Flute and Piano (1959).

Her later works, almost entirely instrumental, are noticeably freer in their construction in accordance with avant-garde ideas of the 1960s and 1970s. Wylie explained in 1985, “I try to study and evaluate all the new musical trends as they arise—twelve-tone, electronic, aleatory, computer, tonal modifications, microtones—whatever. Then I may use, at least to a limited extent, what in all of these trends I find to be aesthetically sound and creatively honest.” Examples include Involution (1967) for orchestra; Psychogram for piano (1968); The Long Look Home (1975), a multimedia work for orchestra with poetry and slides (1975); Incubus for flute, clarinet, percussion, and cello ensemble (1973); Views from Beyond, suite for orchestra (1978); Music for Three Sisters for flute, clarinet and piano (1981); Seven Scenes from Arthur Rackham for two flutes, oboe, viola, cello, piano and percussion (1983); Flights of Fancy (1984), commissioned by Doriot Anthony Dwyer; and Concerto for Flute and Strings (1986).

== Legacy ==
Wylie's papers, which consist of working drafts, master sheets, and performance scores of nearly all her compositions, are housed in the University Library at California State University, Northridge.

== Works ==
Ballet

- Spring Madness (1951)
- Façade, Op. 18 (1956)
- The Ragged Heart, Op. 21 (1961)

Orchestral

- Suite for string orchestra (1941)
- Suite for orchestra, Op. 2 (1941)
- Suite for chamber orchestra, Op. 3 (1942)
- Symphony No. 1 "Archaic", Op. 6 (1943)
- Symphony No. 2, Op. 11 (1948)
- Holiday Overture (Good Luck Overture), Op. 14 (1950)
- Involution for small orchestra, Op. 24 No. 2 (1967)
- The Long Look Home for speaker and orchestra, Op. 30 No. 2 (1975); words by Jeanne Wylie Torosian
- Memories of Birds, Op. 32 No. 1 (1977)
- Views from Beyond, Op. 33 No. 1 (1978)
- Shades of the Anasazi for small orchestra, Op. 38 (1984)

Concertante

- Concerto Grosso for string orchestra and seven solo woodwinds, Op. 15 (1952)
- Clarinet Concertino, Op. 24 No. 1 (1967)
- Concerto for flute and strings orchestra (1986)

Chamber music

- String Quartet No. 1, Op. 1 (1941)
- String Quartet No. 2, Op. 8 (1946)
- Song and Dance for clarinet and piano, Op. 9 (1947)
- Seven Wishful Duets for Two Wistful Recorders (1953)
- Wistful Piece for oboe, or flute, or violin and piano, Op. 16 No. 2 (1953)
- Sonata for viola and piano, Op.16 No.3 (1954)
- String Quartet No. 3, Op. 17 (1956)
- Sonata for flute and piano, Op. 20 (1960)
- Theme Music for "Keep Michigan Beautiful" Campaign for soprano recorder, alto recorder and snare drum (1966)
- Pieces [Music] for Improvisation Ensemble (1968)
- Three Inscapes for flute, viola, guitar, piano and percussion, Op. 26 (1970)
- Five Occurrences for woodwind quintet, Op. 27 (1971)
- Incubus for flute, clarinet, percussion and 16 (or 8, or 32) cellos, Op. 28 (1973)
- Imagi for any combination of flute, oboe, clarinet, violin, cello and piano, Op. 29 (1974)
- Nova for vibraphone solo, flute, violin, clarinet, cello and percussion, Op. 30 No. 1 (1975)
- Toward Sirius for piano, harpsichord, flute, oboe, violin and cello, Op. 31 (1976)
- Airs above the Ground for flute, clarinet, violin and 4 cellos, Op. 32 No. 2 (1977)
- Terrae Incognitae for flute, viola, guitar, piano and percussion, Op. 34 (1979)
- Music for Three Sisters for flute, clarinet and piano, Op. 35 (1981)
- November Music for cello and piano, Op. 36 (1982)
- Scenes from Arthur Rackham for 2 flutes, oboe, viola, cello, piano and percussion, Op. 37 (1983)
- String Quartet No. 4, Op. 37 No. 3 (1983)
- Flights of Fancy for flute solo, Op. 38 No. 2 (1984)
- Signs and Portents for flute, cello and piano (1988)

Piano

- Five Easy Pieces, Op. 4 (1942)
- Sonata No. 1, Op. 7 (1945)
- Sonatina, Op. 10 (1947)
- Five Preludes, Op. 12 (1949)
- Sonata No. 2, Op. 16 No. 1 (1953)
- Six Little Preludes, Op.19, No. 2 (1959)
- Soliloquy for piano left hand, Op. 23 (1966)
- Psychogram, Op. 25 (1968)
- Mandala, Op. 33 No. 2 (1978)
- The White Raven, Op. 37 No. 4 (1984)

Vocal

- The Wanderer for voice and piano (1940)
- God's Grandeur for voice and piano, Op. 13 No. 2 (1950)
- Light for voice and piano, Op. 16 No. 4 (1953)

Choral

- I Sing of a Maiden, Carol for mixed chorus a cappella, Op. 5 (1942); 14th century anonymous text
- Five Madrigals for mixed chorus a cappella, Op. 13, No. 1 (1950); poems by William Blake
- Toward Nowhere for mixed chorus a cappella (1953); words by Jeanne Wylie
- ... in Just Spring for female chorus, 2 flutes, piano and percussion, Op. 19 No. 1 (1958); words by E. E. Cummings
- Echo for female chorus and string orchestra, Op. 22 (1965); words by Christina Rossetti

== Discography ==
- Ruth Shaw Wylie: Chamber Music – Tim Fain, Cyrus Beroukhim (violins); Dov Scheindlin (viola); Arash Amini (cello); Eveline Kuhn (flute); Melissa Marse (piano); RSW Productions 383027 (2010)

Wistful Piece for violin and piano, Op. 16 No. 2
Flights of Fancy for solo flute, Op. 28 No. 2
Sonata for viola and piano, Op. 16 No. 3
String Quartet No. 3, Op. 17
November Music for cello and piano, Op. 36

- Piano Music of American Composers Frank Retzel and Ruth Shaw Wylie – Barry David Salwen (piano); recorded in 1991 at Brooklyn College, City University of New York; Opus One CD 165 (1994)

Five Preludes, Op. 12
The White Raven, Op. 37 No. 2
Soliloquy for Left Hand Alone, Op. 23
Mandala, Op. 33 No. 2
Psychogram, Op. 25

- American Contemporary Instrumental Music – Psychogram; Rosemary Catanese (piano); LP disc; CRI SD 353 (1976); reissued on CD, CRI SD 353-P.
