= Edward V. Hartford =

- Born: Edward Vassallo Hartford; May 28, 1870; Orange, New Jersey
- Died: June 30, 1922 (aged 52); Deal, New Jersey
- Education: Stevens Institute of Technology
- Occupation: Inventor
- Employer: Hartford Suspension Company
- Title: Founder and President
- Spouse: Henrietta Guerard Pollitzer
- Children: Marie Josephine Hartford; George Huntington Hartford II
- Parent(s): George Huntington Hartford; Marie Josephine Ludlum
- Relatives: George Ludlum Hartford (brother); John Augustine Hartford (brother)

Edward Vassallo Hartford (May 28, 1870 - June 30, 1922) was the founder and President of the Hartford Suspension Company who perfected the automobile shock absorber. The middle son of A&P owner George Huntington Hartford and Marie Josephine Ludlum, Edward was the only son not involved in day-to-day operations of the food chain. However, starting in 1903, he was Secretary of the A&P corporation and along with his brothers George and John, was also one of the three trustees who controlled the company's stock after his father's death.

== Biography ==
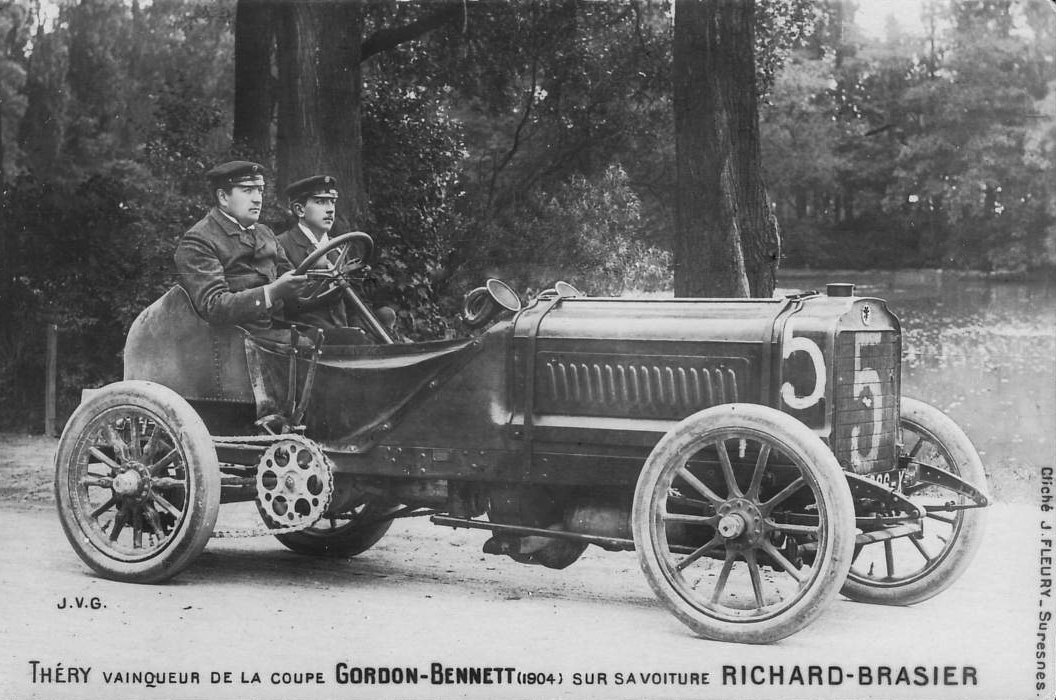
The winner of the 1904 Gordon Bennett competition in Germany equipped with Truffault-Hartford shock absorbers.

Edward was born in Orange, New Jersey. His father, George Huntington Hartford (1832–1917), owned the Great Atlantic and Pacific Tea Company. When Edward was eight, his father was also elected mayor of his community. He graduated from Orange High School and entered Stevens Institute of Technology. After graduating, he turned down his father's offer to join the firm and traveled for a few years in France and India.

Edward was fascinated by early automobiles, which were simply traditional wagons or carriages with primitive engines. While the springs were adequate at the lower speeds of horse-drawn vehicles, they proved dangerous at higher speeds because they continued to bounce after hitting an uneven surface, potentially causing the vehicle to veer out of control. Early bicycles had a similar problem.

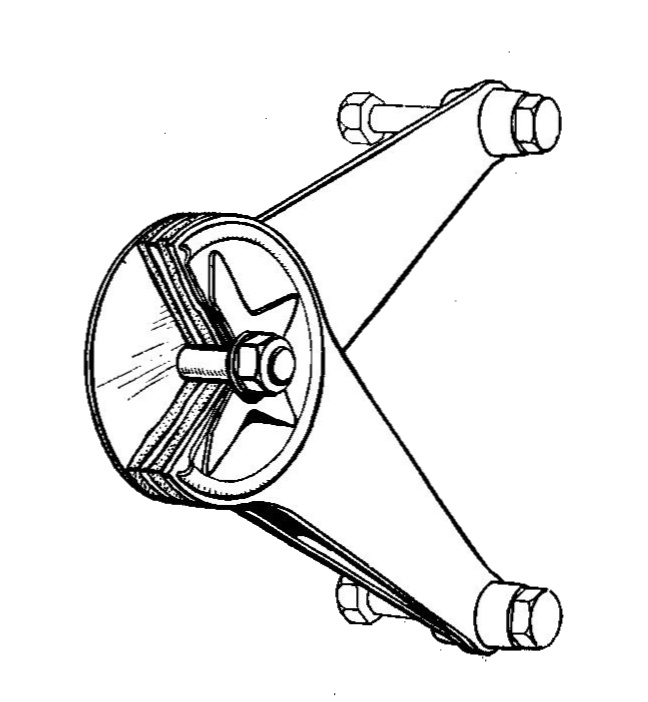
Truffault-Hartford shock absorber

In 1899, Edward was in France at a bicycle race where the winning bicycle was equipped with an early shock absorber built by J. Truffault. Hartford bought the rights to the device and perfected its design. In 1904, he established the Hartford Suspension Company and located the firm on Hudson Street in New York City. That year, a car built by Richard-Brasier equipped with Truffault-Hartford shock absorbers won the Gordon Bennett Cup (auto racing) in Germany, helping to establish a reputation for the new device. In 1908, the factory was moved to Jersey City, New Jersey next to the A&P headquarters. Edward continued to develop new features for automobiles. In 1910, he received a patent for an electric starter and the next year for an electric brake.

== Family ==
In 1901, Hartford married Henrietta Guerard Pollitzer (1881–1948), a socialite whose mother was descended from an old Charleston, South Carolina family. Edward and Henrietta lived on Park Avenue where they were prominent in New York society. They had two children: Josephine Hartford O'Donnell Bryce (1902–1992) and Huntington Hartford (1911–2008). Edward's daughter Josephine married Ivar Bryce. Ivar Bryce’s First Cousin Janet Bryce married David Mountbatten, 3rd Marquess of Milford Haven in 1960. Their children George Mountbatten, 4th Marquess of Milford Haven and Lord Ivar Mountbatten inherited Jo’s House Moyns Park in Essex. David Mountbatten served as Best Man to his first cousin Prince Philip of Greece and Denmark, at his marriage in November 1947 to the Princess Elizabeth, later Queen Elizabeth II. Ivar Bryce was also a close childhood friend of Ian Fleming, the Character Felix in the James Bond Movies is based on Ivar’s middle name John Charles Felix Bryce.

After Edward's company moved to Jersey City, the family moved to Deal, New Jersey, a wealthy community on the shore. Edward was an exceptional violinist and active in sports, including golf, ice skating, and yachting. In 1920, he received a patent for a "scientific putter". A Christian Scientist, he refused to see a doctor and died at age 51.

Now a wealthy widow, Henrietta moved with her children to Newport, Rhode Island where she ultimately purchased Seaverage, next to the Rough Point mansion owned by Doris Duke. In 1937, she married an Italian aristocrat, Prince Guido Pignatelli (1900–1967), of the Dukes of Montecalvo, who was only two years older than her daughter. In addition to Newport, the couple lived at "Wando Plantation", her mansion in South Carolina, in Washington, D.C., and at Melody Farm in Wyckoff, New Jersey where she died in 1948. Edward and Henrietta's granddaughter, Nuala O'Donnell, married Senator Claiborne Pell of Rhode Island.
