= John Vincent (composer) =

American composer, conductor and music educator

John Nathaniel Vincent Jr. (May 17, 1902 – January 21, 1977) was an American composer, conductor, and music educator.

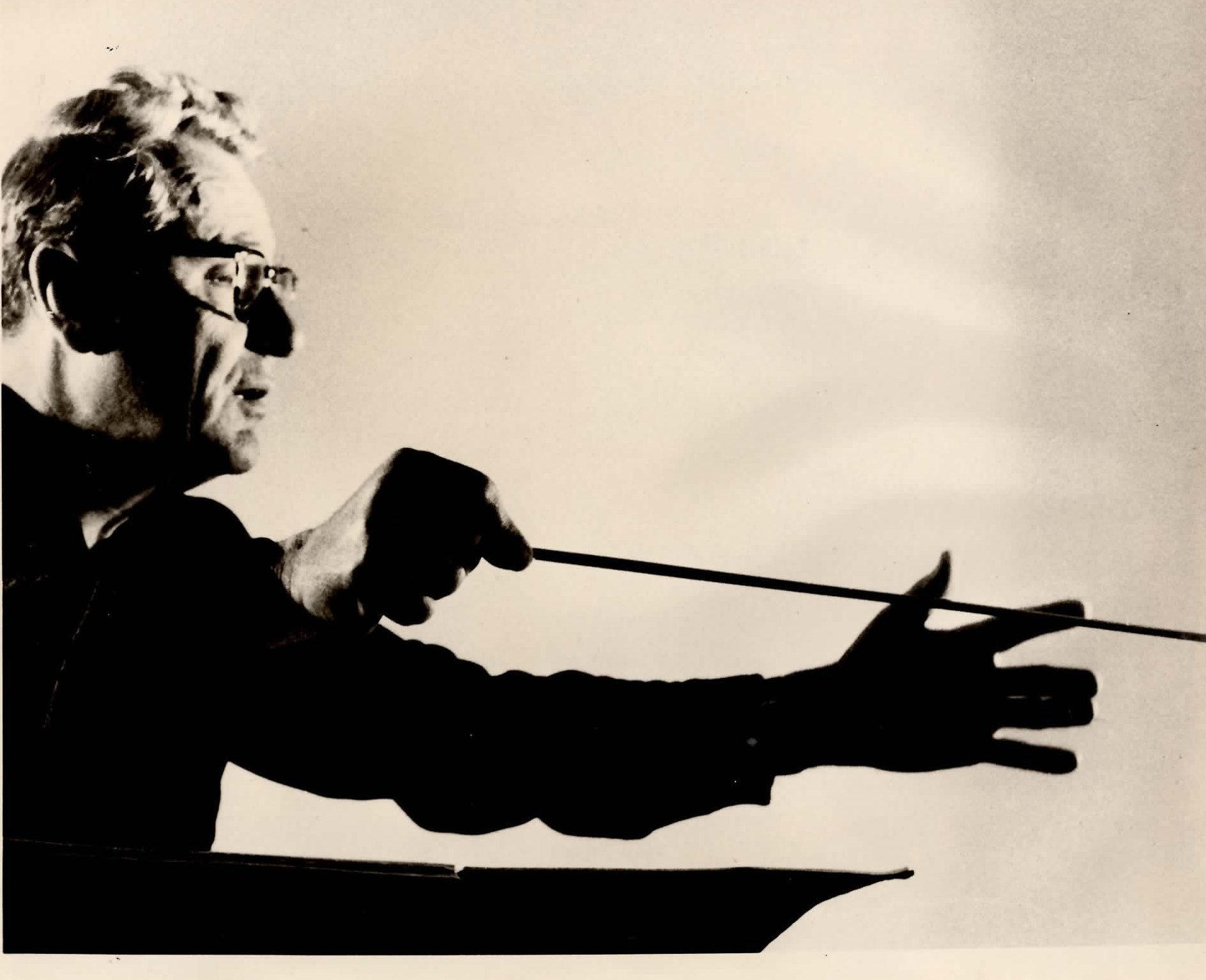
EPSON MFP image

Vincent was born in Birmingham, Alabama, and studied at the New England Conservatory of Music under Frederick Converse and George Chadwick graduating with a diploma in 1927. He continued his studies at George Peabody College where he earned a bachelor's and a master's degree followed by doctoral studies at Harvard University from 1933 to 1935. While at Harvard studying under Walter Piston he won the John Knowles Paine Traveling Fellowship for two years of study with Nadia Boulanger. He was able to study original manuscripts of all classical composers at the Bibliothèque nationale de France (French National Library). After transferring to Cornell University he earned his PhD in 1942. Made field recordings for Library of Congress with Alan Lomax, using Fairchild machine to preserve notables of the old South. Vincent was head of the music department at Western Kentucky University from 1937 to 1945 and Schoenberg's successor as professor of composition at UCLA, a position he held from 1946 to 1969. He surveyed music schools to create UCLA's state-of-art music building and Schoenberg Hall.

As a composer, Vincent's music is known for its rhythmic vitality and lyricism. Although his music is essentially classical in form it is distinctly individual. The free tonality of his work makes use of what he calls 'paratonality': the predominance of a diatonic element in a polytonal or atonal passage. Vincent wrote numerous orchestral works, chamber music pieces, art songs, and choral works. He also wrote one ballet, 3 Jacks (1942), a film score, Red Cross (1948), and an opera, Primeval Void (1969).

In 1951 his book The Diatonic Modes in Modern Music was published. He also conducted orchestras throughout the US, and all South American countries sponsored by U.S.-State Dept, and he was a director of the Rustic Canyon art-colony Huntington Hartford Foundation from 1952 to 1965. He died in Santa Monica, California in 1977.

Vincent was founding-director of Walt Disney's California Institute of the Arts.

== Personal life ==
Vincent married Amelia Bartlett, violinist, in 1927. In 1928 he formed the Aeolian Trio with Amelia and Abbie Durkee. Together they performed recitals in the El Paso area (Parker 1981). Amelia and John lived in Paris from 1935 to 1936 with their 7-year-old son, Nathaniel. In Paris, Vincent made arrangements to study privately with Boulanger at the Ecole Normale de Musique. During this year, Vincent's marriage with Amelia suffered. Amelia and their son returned to the United States to live with Vincent's parents. Amelia and John divorced in 1937. From June through October 1936, Vincent traveled by bicycle and motor scooter throughout Europe. After returning to the United States, he married Ruth Kimball in December 1937. They had two children together, Helen and John (Parker 1981).

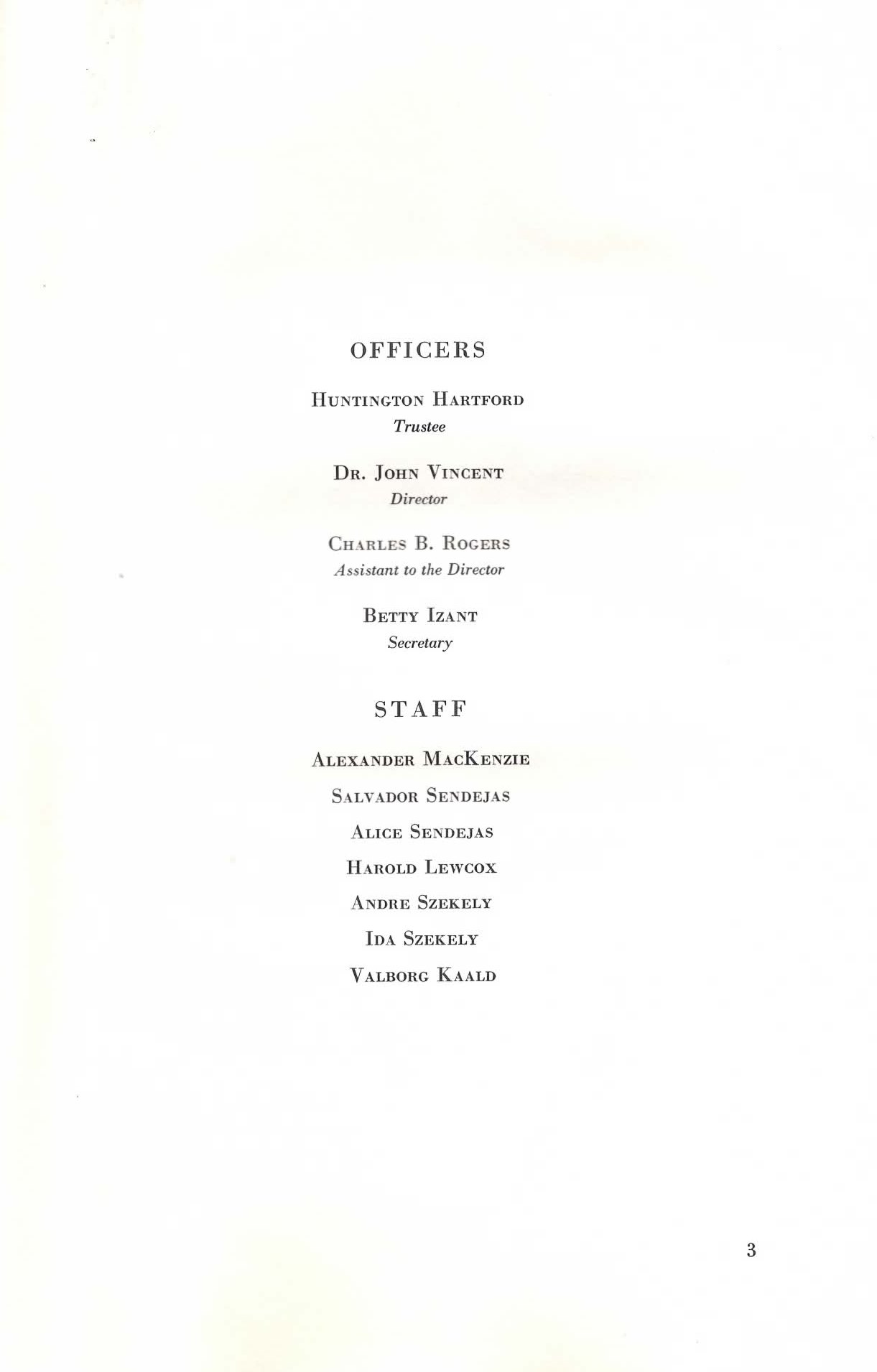
EPSON MFP image
