= Aaron Schwarz =

American architect

Aaron B. Schwarz is an American architect and founder of Plan A, a small firm in New York City. Prior to starting Plan A, Aaron partnered with Bradford Perkins and Mary-Jean Eastman as a founding principal when Perkins Eastman reorganized in 1984. His architectural works include higher education buildings at New York City College of Technology, Cornell University, Ashoka University, Columbia University, UConn and Westchester Community College, as well as projects in India and China. Other notable design work includes the development of a "protoparts" system for the New York City Department of Education.
