= John A. Hartford Foundation =

American philanthropy

The John A. Hartford Foundation
- Founded: 1929
- Founder: John A. Hartford; George L. Hartford
- Type: Non-operating private foundation (IRS exemption status): 501(c)(3)
- Purpose: Aging, Health
- Location: New York, NY, United States of America
- Region served: United States
- Method: Donations and Grants
- Key people: Rani E. Snyder, President; John R. Mach, Chairman, Board of Trustees
- Revenue: $27,106,354 (2015)
- Expenses: $35,905,082 (2015)
- Endowment: US$ 460.7 million as of 31 December 2011
- Employees: 18
- Website: https://www.johnahartford.org/

The John A. Hartford Foundation (JAHF or the Hartford Foundation) is a private United States–based philanthropy whose current mission is to improve the care of older adults. For many years, it made grants for research and education in geriatric medicine, nursing and social work. It now focuses on three priority areas: creating age-friendly health systems, supporting family caregivers and improving serious illness, and end-of-life care.

== History ==
Based in New York City, the foundation was founded in 1929 by John Augustine Hartford and later joined by his brother George Ludlum Hartford, the family owners of the A&P grocery chain. The foundation's mission from the beginning has been "to do the greatest good for the greatest number."

In the early and mid-20th century, the foundation primarily made grants for research centered on basic and clinical medicine and health care quality and costs. It was at one time the largest funder in these areas. In 1982, the focus turned towards improving the care of older adults, as there became an increasing need to fund this underserved area. In 1994, the foundation made this priority its chief mission.

== Leadership ==
Rani E. Snyder is president of the John A. Hartford Foundation. She assumed the role in 2026 after serving as acting president and previously as vice president of program.

Snyder is an American nonprofit executive and philanthropy leader with more than 25 years of experience in health care and aging. Her work has focused on improving care for older adults, including support for family caregivers. Prior to joining The John A. Hartford Foundation, Snyder worked at the Donald W. Reynolds Foundation, where she held leadership roles in its health care grant-making programs.

Snyder serves on the board of the American Society on Aging and is a past board chair of Grant-makers In Aging. She is also a fellow of the New York Academy of Medicine. She earned a Master of Public Administration in health care policy from New York University and completed doctoral studies in health services research at the UCLA School of Public Health.

== Priority areas ==
In a rapidly evolving health care environment, the Foundation supports the spread of evidence-based models that can accelerate care improvement for older adults. The three priority areas are: Age-Friendly Health Systems; Family Caregiving, and Serious Illness & End of Life.

=== Age-Friendly Health Systems ===
To prevent harm to older adults, improve health outcomes, and lower overall costs, health systems must adopt evidence-based models and practices that deliver better care to the aging population across all settings, including the home and community. By collaborating with experts in the healthcare industry, The John A. Hartford Foundation is working to create health systems that are age-friendly and able to meet the goals of the Triple Aim.

Grant-making in this area will: （1）Develop large-scale approaches that help health systems transform care; （2）Operationalize the essential elements of good care, building on the Foundation’s investments in evidence-based models and best practices; and （3）Better integrate community-based supports and services within the health system and across the continuum of care.

=== Family Caregiving ===
There are nearly 18 million people in the US regularly providing care to an older loved one who needs assistance. These family caregivers often manage complex care responsibilities, but frequently report receiving limited preparation and systemic support.

Recognizing the critical role that family caregivers play, The John A. Hartford Foundation is committed to transforming our health care and social services systems to meet the needs of family caregivers.

Grantmaking in this area will: （1）Improve the ability of health systems and providers to identify, assess, and support family caregivers; （2）Raise awareness among policymakers, health system leaders, funders, and the public to drive change; and （3）Create large-scale change in partnership with national efforts.

=== Serious Illness and End of Life ===
With increasing age comes greater risk for serious illness and the natural progression towards the end of life. Too often, care at this time fails to meet the goals and preferences of older adults and results in harm and burden. Palliative care and other effective approaches must be more widely available.

The John A. Hartford Foundation will continue to promote care that preserves dignity and honors the wishes of older adults and their families.

Grantmaking in this area will: (1) Increase access to high-quality palliative care services and other evidence-based models and practices; (2) Develop approaches for better educating and preparing the health care workforce; and (3) Foster communication and community-based solutions while informing public policy supportive of the needs of the seriously ill and their families.

== Activities ==
From about 1980 to 2012, the foundation focused on a two-pronged effort to build training capacity and conduct research into different models of care for older adults at schools of medicine, nursing, and social work. Its current programs aim to more directly impact the health of older adults. In 2013, the Foundation organized its grantmaking in five portfolios: Interprofessional Leadership in Action, Linking Education and Practice, Developing and Disseminating Models of Care, Tools and Measures for Quality Care, and Policy and Communications. In 2015 and 2016, the foundation implemented its current priority areas: creating age-friendly health systems, supporting family caregivers, and improving serious illness and end-of-life care. In 2016, the Age-Friendly Health System initiative was started in collaboration with the Institute for Healthcare Improvement (IHI), American Hospital Association (AHA), and the Catholic Health Association of the United States (CHA).

In 2008, the foundation led a consortium of grantmakers to fund a study from the Institute of Medicine to look at the "crisis" of an ill-prepared workforce and outdated models of caring for older adults."

== Geriatric training ==
In order to grow the geriatric workforce, JAHF has helped to develop training programs across various disciplines, from university-based physicians to nurses and social workers. The intention has been to establish a strong interdisciplinary labor force that is well-trained clinically and well-equipped academically to further geriatric research and care.

=== Medicine ===
One of the largest and most important programs in the foundation's recent history has been to help build academic capacity in geriatric medicine through the Centers of Excellence in Geriatric Medicine, which started in 1986. They are located at academic medical centers around the country, and are known as high-throughput producers of academic geriatricians as well as the generators of basic, clinical, and population level medical knowledge about older adults. As many as 55,000 physicians are trained or mentored at these centers annually.

The Paul Beeson Physician Faculty Scholars in Aging Research Program was launched in 1994, in partnership with Atlantic Philanthropies, the Commonwealth Fund, and the Starr Foundation. As of 2019, the three-year fellowship has trained 225 scholars, with significant impacts to aging research.

The foundation has also supported training and development programs for medical students, fellows, junior faculty, and senior thought leaders through its funding of the Association of American Medical Colleges for geriatric scholarships, residence programs, and curriculum development. Another important initiative has been building bridges from geriatric medicine out to the subspecialties of internal medicine and surgical and related specialties.

=== Nursing ===
Geriatric nursing has long been an important focus of JAHF, and this culminated in $5 million of funding to establish the John A. Hartford Foundation Institute for the Advancement of Geriatric Nursing in 1996, the first of its kind in the US. From supporting nursing societies to the American Association of Colleges of Nursing, the institute helped to build curriculums and experiences to expose nursing students to geriatrics in their programs.

To further the academic training of nurses, five centers of geriatric nursing excellence were established – 300 trainees had received pre- and postdoctoral fellowships through 2015, and as of 2012, 95% were part of nursing school faculties.

=== Social work ===
The foundation focused on enhancing the capability of schools of social work to train aging-competent social workers through the Geriatric Social Work Initiative in the late 1990s. There were three core goals for the initiative: (1) work with the Council on Social Work Education to incorporate geriatrics into the curriculum; (2) offer scholarships and fellowships to faculty and students to fund their pursuits in geriatric social work; and (3) provide practical exposure by placing upper-level social work students in field experiences.

== Care models ==
=== Community-based care ===
Programs of All-Inclusive Care for the Elderly (PACE) has long been championed by JAHF. Providing services for approximately 40,000 people, the model allows persons older than fifty-five to receive health and social services in their homes, instead of resorting to long-term care facilities. Despite being reimbursed by Medicare and Medicaid, PACE still only covers a small portion of those who are eligible.

=== Team Care ===
Separate from the foundation’s support of geriatric training, there were multiple studies done on promoting the interdisciplinary nature of care teams. Beyond just physicians and nurses, these teams also included social workers and others, and were especially effective for managing those with complex conditions and multiple comorbidities.

=== Hospital and home care ===
For some older adults with serious illness, the preferred place of treatment is their home. The Hospital at Home program allows this option for conditions such as congestive heart failure. The foundation has also invested in other innovative delivery models, such as Acute Care of the Elderly (ACE), which focuses on structuring age-appropriate hospital rooms, and Nurses Improving Care for Healthsystem Elders (NICHE), a framework for age-friendly nursing care in hospitals and other healthcare settings.

=== Palliative care ===
Originating in 2006, JAHF’s support of the Center for Palliative Care at Mount Sinai Medical Center has been one of its most significant projects. Despite difficulty in securing Medicare reimbursement, palliative care has expanded significantly, with almost 75% of all hospitals offering it in some capacity.

== Leadership and policy ==
JAHF has avidly supported thought leaders in policy, from funding National Health Policy Forum seminars to investing in various reports by the National Academies. The foundation continues to engage in the policy sphere through its various partnerships with government agencies.

=== Special grants ===
The foundation has made rare special grants, including grants in response to the 911 terrorist events, and Hurricanes Katrina and Rita. The grants have often focused on better disaster preparation and relief policies for institutionalized older adults.

=== Grantee communication ===
Beginning in 2006, the foundation has made efforts to communicate with its grantees and other stakeholders, sponsoring grantee perception surveys by the Center for Effective Philanthropy and released in part to the public. (A 2010 Grantee Perception Report is not currently publicly available.) It has circulated an e-newsletter to its stakeholder community since at least 2004, and has launched an online blog, Health AGEnda.

== Impact ==
When JAHF entered the space of aging and health, there were very few funders, and often with limited scope. The Veterans Health Administration and the Bureau of Health Professions were the only ones involved in geriatrician training. The Gerontological Society of American and the American Geriatrics Society, both created in the 1940s, helped to finance research and clinical work in aging. And in 1974, the National Institute of Aging was established, also with the primary intent to fund clinical research.

At that time (late 1970s), there were less than 750 geriatricians in the entire United States. Since then, JAHF has helped make tremendous progress, with more than 7,000 geriatricians certified by 2010 and geriatrics integrated into almost all medical curricula and board certification requirements across the country. Geriatrics exposure has also significantly changed in nursing education, with 90% of bachelor’s-level nursing programs incorporating geriatrics into their required coursework by 2003. This training is not just limited to physicians and nurses, JAHF has sought to bring geriatrics into the professional education of all health workers on some level.

The foundation has funded research into several experiential care delivery models, with subsequent initiatives focusing on policy integration within reimbursement frameworks.

== Governance ==
The foundation, like most large U.S. charitable foundations, has no set closure date.

Although not directly related by mission or program activities, in 1983 the Hartford Family Foundation was established in the State of New Jersey to preserve "the memory of the late George Huntington Hartford and the company he founded in 1859."

=== Investments ===
The foundation solicits no new donations, and invests the assets that it has not yet distributed to maximize the return on investment. Unsolicited donations or estate gifts are deposited into the foundation's core accounts, while larger donations are earmarked and targeted for projects mutually agreeable to the foundation and the donor(s).

=== Awards and honors ===
The foundation's grantees are often recognized with prestigious awards and honors—including multiple MacArthur Fellow ("genius") grants The foundation itself has won recognition; for example, in 2011 the foundation received the Community College of Philadelphia's Foundation Keystone Award for its work on the needs of older adults in community college nursing programs.

=== Criticism ===
The foundation's genesis as an offspring of the A&P supermarket fortune, and its consequent stockholding ties with the A&P during the chain's marketplace decline in the 1960s and '70s, proved almost disastrous to the solvency of the foundation. At several points grantmaking was placed on hiatus. In 1969 the foundation attracted attention of the U.S. House Ways and Means Committee during hearings about the tax treatment of foundations with substantial financial links to corporations. Huntington Hartford, John and George Hartford's nephew, never a part of the foundation's governance structure, was highly critical of this lingering financial relationship. A period of A&P stock divestiture ensued and the foundation returned to financial stability by the late 1970s.

== See also ==
- The Great Atlantic & Pacific Tea Company
- George Huntington Hartford
- George Ludlum Hartford
- John Augustine Hartford
- Huntington Hartford
