= John Augustine Hartford =

American businessman (1872–1951)

- Born: February 10, 1872; Orange, New Jersey, US
- Died: September 20, 1951 (aged 79); Chrysler Building, Manhattan, New York, US
- Employer: Great Atlantic and Pacific Tea Company
- Title: President
- Spouses: Pauline Augusta Corwin; Frances Bolger; Pauline Augusta Corwin
- Parents: George Huntington Hartford; Marie Josephine Ludlum
- Relatives: George Ludlum Hartford (brother); Edward V. Hartford (brother); Huntington Hartford (nephew)

John Augustine Hartford (February 10, 1872 – September 20, 1951) was the longtime President of the Great Atlantic and Pacific Tea Company ("A&P"), serving in that position for 35 years from 1916 until his death. His father, George Huntington Hartford (1833–1917) left the control of the company's voting stock to a trust that gave total control to John and his older brother George Ludlum Hartford (1864–1957) who served as chairman. John, who one company historian named the "Merchant Prince", ran the business operations side of the empire, while his brother George ran the financial side. Time magazine interviewed John and his brother George who were on their cover in November 1950. Time wrote that "going to the A&P was almost an American tribal rite". The Wall Street Journal in an editorial on August 29, 2011, wrote "Together the brothers, neither of whom had finished high school, built what would be, for 40 years, the largest retail outlet in the world." The New York Times in an editorial on September 7, 2011, wrote that John and George Hartford "were among the 20th century's most accomplished and visionary businessmen."

Born and raised in Orange, New Jersey, John Hartford started his career at A&P in 1888 after finishing high school. Far more outgoing that either his father or older brother, John traveled extensively and became the team's representative in the far flung empire. After his father acquired ownership of the company from the estate of George Gilman, the company's founder, John lead the company's expansion and the firm became the largest grocery chain by 1915. He reinvented the company three times: the economy grocery store concept in 1912; the combination grocery/meat/produce store in the mid-1920s; and the self serve supermarket in the late 1930s. As a result, he was responsible for improving the country's nutrition by lowering the cost of food and expanding the diet of the average American.

John's personal life was also different from his conservative father and brother. He was married three times: to Pauline Augusta Corwin (1872–1948) in 1892; to Frances Bolger in 1924; and, to his first wife for a second time in 1925. In 1950, Hartford had a chapel built on the New York-Presbyterian Hospital campus in memory of his recently deceased wife, Pauline. He owned a large Tudor manor house in Valhalla, New York and maintained a suite at the Plaza Hotel. John had no children and left his estate to the John A. Hartford Foundation. "To immortalize outstanding American merchants", Joseph Kennedy in 1953 commissioned a bronze bust of John's father George Huntington Hartford, four times life size along with 7 other men, which would come to be known as the Merchandise Mart Hall of Fame in Chicago.

== Life and career ==
John Hartford was born in Orange, New Jersey and was the fourth child of George Huntington Hartford (1832–1917) and Marie Josephine Ludium (1837–1915). John's father was already an executive at the Great Atlantic and Pacific Tea Company which his father would then own. Mr. Hartford was also elected Mayor of Orange when John was six and served as both Mayor and Gilman's partner. At an early age, John demonstrated an entrepreneurial spirit when on St. Patrick's day he parked his father's buggy along the parade route and charged people to climb up to get a better view. After completing high school, he joined A&P, working at a company warehouse.

By the time John joined the firm, A&P was making the transition from being a chain of tea and coffee shops to the first chain of grocery stores. John's older brother, known as Mr. George to distinguish him from his father known as Mr. Hartford, had joined the firm eight years earlier and had won respect for his suggestions to expand the then limited product line. Both John's father and brother were private people as compared to John's extroverted personality, and John quickly assumed the role of representing headquarters by extensively traveling around the company. Gilman died in 1901, and George Sr. acquired control of the company from the estate, eventually purchasing the interest of the Gilman heirs. At that time, A&P ranked only 5th among national grocery chains with 200 stores and the company started an aggressive expansion plan. About 1907, John and his brother George assumed greater management responsibilities when their father reached 75 with George Jr. controlling finance and John directing sales and operations.

One of John's early changes was to change the branding on the company's lines of private-label products. John decided to replace the company's long name on labels and store signs with the now distinctive "A&P". He also expanded the product lines available in the stores. To make room, he substituted the large inventory of premiums displayed in the stores with S&H Green Stamps. By 1912, the company reached 400 stores. Next, he proposed opening no-frills economy stores that offered low prices by operating at a 12% markup rather than the normal 22% markup. His father and brother rejected the idea, but later agreed to an experiment. The first store was opened with an investment of only $3,000 and produced a higher rate of return than the regular stores. Because the economy stores were small, they could be quickly set up in existing real estate. In three years, the chain expanded to 1600 units, opening 864 stores in 1915 alone. As a result of John's marketing concepts, A&P was now the largest grocer in the country. The next year, Mr. Hartford retired and John was named president while his brother George became chairman and Treasurer. In 1917, their father died and left his estate to a one-generation trust that gave total control of the company's voting stock to George and John as long as either lived.

In addition to its retail stores, A&P operated manufacturing plants on a small scale. After the Supreme Court ruled that manufacturers could establish minimum prices for their products, John decided to bypass the decision by expanding A&P's own manufacturing facilities. John personally consulted with Henry Ford about vertical integration and turned A&P into one of the country's largest food producers including coffee, tea, bakery, canned goods, and even a salmon packing operation in Alaska. A&P continued to rapidly expand and by 1925 operated 13,961 stores with sales of $400 million and profit of $10 million. John convinced George to decentralize management into regions but George insisted that headquarters retain control of finances, real estate, and purchasing policy, the areas he personally managed. The company introduced larger "combination stores" including space for meats, produce, and dairy as well as traditional grocery items, and launched a new drive to reduce costs. By 1930 the company's 16,000 stores reached sales of $1 billion.

A&P's sales and profits increased during the early years of the Depression because of the company's ability to deliver low prices. Meanwhile, a few entrepreneurs experimented with large self-service "supermarkets" that offered even lower prices. John held back opening his first supermarket until 1936. Over the next two years, the company opened 1,100 of the larger stores. The chain continued to rebuild itself so that by 1950 A&P operated 4,000 supermarkets and 500 smaller combination stores. Sales reached $3.2 billion with an after-tax profit of $32 million.

During the 1930s and 1940s, the Hartford brothers and their company were dragged into a political and legal battle that threatened to destroy the firm. To protect small independent grocers, Texas Congressman Wright Patman introduced legislation to place a prohibitive federal tax on each chain store. John hired a lobbyist and with his brother published a long letter pointing out that the effect of Patman's legislation would be a significant increase of food prices. The tide of public opinion turned against the bill and the proposal died.

During these events, in March 1939 Hartford received a call from a friend of President Franklin D. Roosevelt (FDR) inquiring if John was interested in loaning the President's son, Elliott Roosevelt $200,000 to invest in Elliott's foundering broadcasting network, the Texas State Network. When the President's son met with Hartford, John was reluctant to help him out and insisted that the President approve the transaction. In an arranged move, Elliott said "Let's get Dad on the phone," and called FDR in Warm Springs, Georgia. The President (who did not know Hartford) began the conversation with "Hello John!" He assured Hartford that he knew all about the matter, and that it was a sound investment. Despite the furious opposition of brother George Hartford, John felt he could not refuse the deal, especially as the Patman bill was still pending. After the loan, the White House arranged for the defeat of the bill in Congress. However, Elliott's broadcasting network, for which he had also obtained other loans in return for political favors, went bankrupt by the end of 1939.

In late 1941, after Elliott had joined the Army, the President asked Jesse Jones to negotiate settlements with his son's creditors. Though he later said he assumed the President would back up Elliott's debts, Hartford, influenced by the outbreak of war, in March 1942 agreed to accept $4,000 and then wrote off the remaining $196,000 on his taxes. He also agreed to give up his security in TSN stock, which Jesse Jones represented as "worthless." Hartford soon found that the stock rose rapidly after Elliott left the network and was in fact worth far more than the loan. In his memoir Fifty Billion Dollars, Jesse Jones detailed the matter and asserted that FDR had manipulated him into settling the deal with Hartford and two other major creditors.

The Federal Bureau of Investigation under J. Edgar Hoover had been aware of Elliott's schemes from the beginning. The Hartford loan scandal, which involved several other parties, was discovered by Congressional subcommittees investigating the U.S. Federal Communications Commission (FCC) in 1943, but FDR's top aide (then in private practice) Thomas Corcoran succeeded in keeping it under wraps until after FDR's death in April 1945. On wiretaps, Corcoran is heard saying that if the case (and related FCC matters) had broken in 1944, it would have finished FDR politically. However, soon after FDR's death John Hartford agreed to talk to syndicated columnist Westbrook Pegler about the matter, and a major investigation was launched, thanks to which the financial details are known today.

The matter caused bitter public controversy in August 1945, but in Congress, the Democratic majority shelved the matter, though registering a blistering Republican minority opinion. Both sides agreed Hartford's tax deduction was probably legitimate but Republicans contended that the President's son should have reported the debt forgiveness as income. Hartford testified to the Bureau of Internal Revenue that he never would have issued the loan without the President's personal assurances, and that he assumed FDR's word was "as good as S&P." Although he maintained that the Patman bill would have bankrupted A&P, he absolutely denied that he dealt with Elliott and Jones in order to obtain political favors.

John Hartford's favor to the President did not protect the company when Roosevelt's anti-trust division charged John and his brother George with a criminal violation of the anti-trust laws. The prosecutors contended that the combination of the company's manufacturing, distribution and retail operations, if unchecked, would drive all competition out of business. The company countered that its market share was only in the 15% range and that its low-cost strategy had resulted in a significant improvement in that nation's nutrition and standard of living. In 1945, the court agreed with the government and fined each of the brothers $10,000. In 1949, the U.S. Court of Appeals upheld the decision and the anti-trust division asked the court to break up the company Thousands of letters poured into the Justice Department supporting the company and the Hartford brothers gave extensive interviews with Time which put them on the magazine's November 13, 1950 cover. The case dragged on until the more business-friendly Eisenhower Administration dropped its demands to break up the company.

In 1893, John married Pauline Augusta Corwin (July 18, 1872–September 5, 1948) of Goshen, New York but did not have children. They lived at the Hotel Marie Antoinette in Manhattan. Because of the pressures of his work, the couple drifted apart and separated in 1915. Hartford became attached to Frances Bolger, a young model that he ultimately married in June 1923. The marriage lasted only six months and in 1924 he remarried Pauline in Paris. In 1928, they completed a Tudor manor house known as Buena Vista Farm in Valhalla, New York that they used as a weekend and summer residence. In 1953, the house was converted to Westchester Community College. The couple also maintained a suite at the Plaza Hotel and in 1929 created the John A. Hartford Foundation with a focus on improving health care for older Americans.

John died of a heart attack in an elevator at the Chrysler Building after attending a Chrysler board meeting. The San Francisco Call-Bulletin wrote "John A. Hartford belonged to a little group of Americans whose energy and vision made us the most prosperous nation in the world. He pioneered in foodstuffs just as Henry Ford did in Transportation. Their philosophy was blunt and simple, just as most works of genius are simple, sell more for less." The Columbus Georgia Ledger wrote "What Ford meant to transportation, what Edison meant to electricity, what Burbank meant to Horticulture, John Hartford meant to Food Retailing in America." The Davenport Daily Times wrote "In the death of Mr. John there passes a Retail Napoleon. He had a Grocery Empire as Ford had an Automobile Empire, Rockefeller an Oil Empire, Carnegie a Steel Empire. We shall not see their like again."

== See also ==
- John A. Hartford Foundation
- A&P Canada
- Great Atlantic was one of the comparator companies in the book Good to Great
