= Westchester Community College =

Community college in Valhalla, New York, US

SUNY Westchester Community College
- Former names: New York State Institute of Applied Arts and Sciences (1946–1953)
- Motto: Building Minds, Building Futures.
- Type: Public community college
- Established: 1946; 80 years ago
- Parent institution: State University of New York
- Affiliations: NJCAA Division I, III Region 15, District 3, Mid Hudson Conference
- President: Belinda S. Miles
- Students: 9,709 (fall 2025)
- Location: Valhalla, New York, United States; 41°04′00″N 73°47′25″W
- Campus: Suburban 218 acres (88 ha)
- Colors: Navy and Gold
- Nicknames: Vikings, Westcos
- Mascot: Chester
- Website: www.sunywcc.edu

SUNY Westchester Community College (also known as Westchester Community College or WCC) is a public community college in Valhalla, New York, in Westchester County. It is part of the State University of New York system.

== History ==
New York state opened five coed technical institutes in 1946, one each in the communities of Buffalo, Binghamton, Utica, New York, and White Plains. The five institutes were operated and financially supported by the state. The Westchester County location in White Plains was called the New York Institute of Applied Arts and Sciences and was housed in a few rooms of the Battle Hill School. The state decided to close the schools in 1953, unless the five communities would accept operating responsibilities and share the financial costs with the state. All five communities decided to retain the institutes. Some members of the Westchester County Board of Supervisors objected to taking on the management of the New York Institute of Applied Arts and Sciences, but community organizations, such as women's clubs, business men's leagues, and civic associations, voiced support. Some even pledged scholarships. A deal was reached so that the financial burden would be shared equally between the state, county, and the student body, with each contributing one-third towards the school's operating costs. On August 12, 1953, Westchester County announced that the Institute would be replaced with Westchester Community College beginning September 1, 1953.

New York governor Thomas E. Dewey appointed WCC's first board of trustees, which was composed of "successful lawyers, editors, manufacturers, labor readers and persons of varied racial backgrounds". The college's first president was Philip C. Martin and its first board chairman was Chauncey T.S. Fish. WCC began operating with a budget of $400,893. Original enrollment at the school was 550 men and women, paying in-state tuition of $125 per semester, and out-of-state tuition of $250 per semester. Westchester County billed the home counties of non-Westchester students an additional $125. The first courses available were in business administration, building construction, technologies (electrical, mechanical, industrial chemistry), food administration, and medical-dental office work. Originally, the college awarded Associate of Applied Sciences degrees. Night courses were offered, but did not count towards a degree. Additional instruction was provided in English, mathematics, and social sciences. Initial extracurricular activities included music, golf, basketball, track, chess, radio, and photography.

The salary range for faculty was $3,900-7,000, "somewhat higher than most public schools" in 1953, but required 12 months of work and no tenure was granted at the time. "Minor employees" of the college had a salary starting at $3,480, and the president received a salary of $12,400.

=== Search for a permanent location ===
Paying $30,000 per year in rent to the county, and facing eviction from the Battle Hill School facility, the college began looking for alternate housing. The trustees of State University of New York (SUNY) approved spending $25,000, matching a pledge by the county board, to plan for a permanent site for WCC. In April 1955, a ten-member committee was formed by County Executive James D. Hopkins investigated possible sites for Westchester Community College. In addition to "many old estates", three main sites were available to the college: Ridge Road Park (Greenburgh), reservation land in White Plains on the Bronx River Parkway, and a "used state normal school site" in White Plains on North Street. By late in that year, sixteen properties had been examined, including lands located in parks, private estates, closed schools, and open countryside. The site committee agreed to a minimum of 100-acres for the college, and the state and county were sharing a capital commitment of $5,800,000 to build the new campus.

In August 1956, the site committee chose to locate the campus on the Ridge Road Park property in Hartsdale, then the estate of Henry J. Gaisman, an executive with The Gillette Company. The committee rejected more rural sites because of their distance from populated areas. The chosen property was within walking distance to the Hartsdale train station and to bus stops on Central Park Avenue. Hopkins and the committee asked the county to buy the property immediately, but Gaisman "cooled to the idea" and eventually prevented officials from entering the property. John H. Downing, a member of the board of supervisors, argued to have a northern Westchester site chosen instead of the Gaisman estate. The board argued that the 136 acre Gaisman property was best because of its central location in the county, and that 85% of the college's students lived in southern Westchester and New York City. Gaisman continued to refuse to sell his property, and on October 1, 1956, the County Board of Supervisors voted 25 to 15 to acquire the land by means of condemnation. Before the county could legally act, Gaisman gifted the estate to the Roman Catholic Archdiocese of New York, forcing the site committee to look elsewhere.

With the Gaisman estate off the table, the county turned its attention to the 364-acre Valhalla estate of the late John A. Hartford, who was president of the Great Atlantic and Pacific Tea Company. The property, called Buena Vista Farm, was occupied by Yale University, which only used "a few of the acres", but which had a contract with the Hartford Foundation to use the land until 1972. Yale conducted forestry research at the site, and had a $500,000 geophysics laboratory located there. On June 28, 1957, the county board voted 37 to 3 to purchase the Hartford site. The county's contract with the Hartford Foundation specified that the land be used for "educational and charitable" purposes. Some county officials objected to the large site being used exclusively for the college. A compromise was reached to divide the land for use between the college and county recreation. Yale agreed to vacate its operations completely by August 31, 1958. The Hartford Foundation agreed to sell the property, valued in 1958 between $3,000,000-4,000,000, for only $750,000. The low price was offered to help lower the cost of tuition for students. With the land finally acquired and plans in place to relocate the college from the Battle Hill School to Valhalla by 1959, County Executive Hopkins vowed to expand the college into a 4-year school awarding bachelor's degrees.

=== Presidents ===
1. Philip C. Martin (1946–1970)
2. Joseph N. Hankin (1971–2013)
3. Belinda S. Miles (2015–present)

== Campus ==
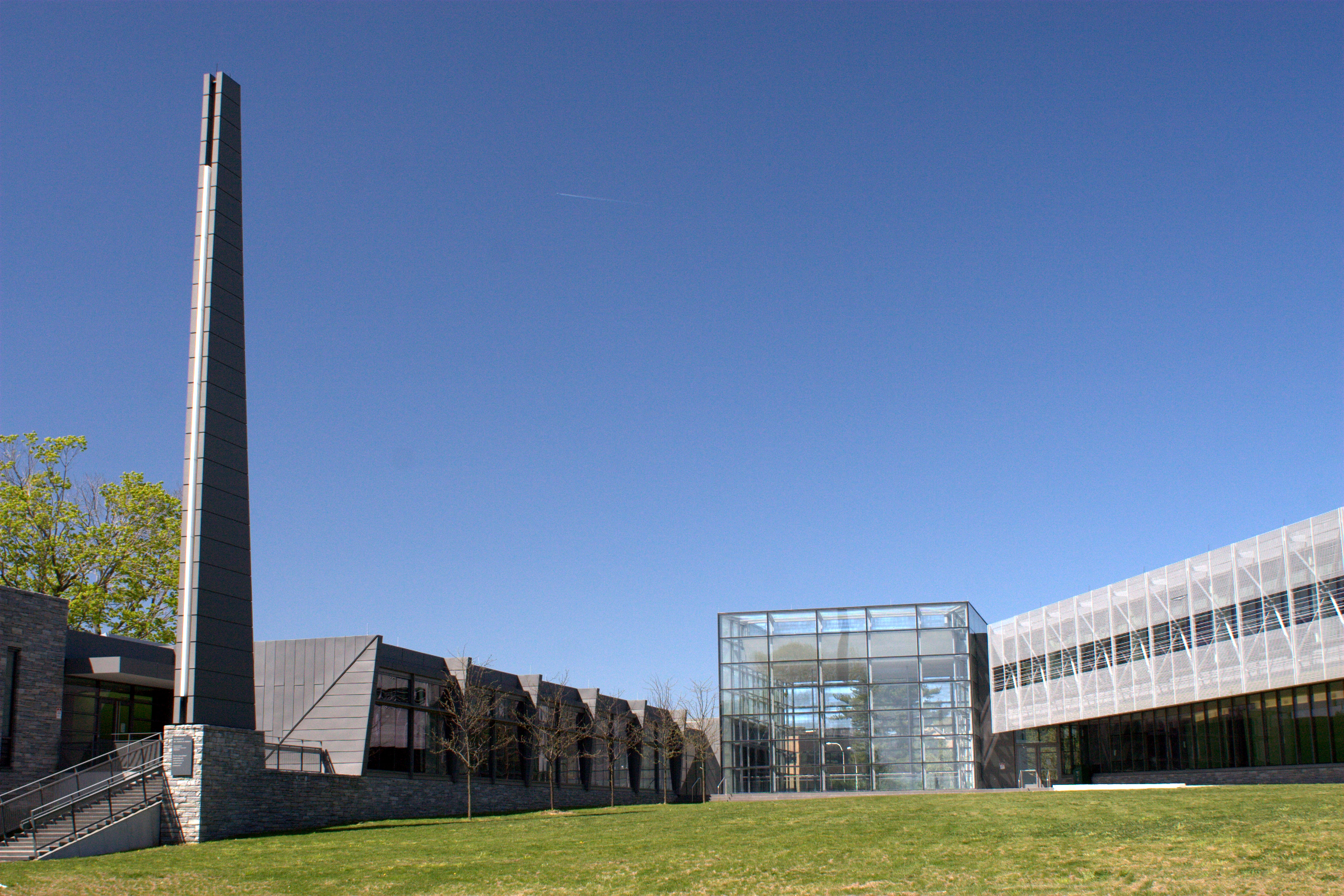
The Gateway Building on the campus of Westchester Community College in Valhalla, New York.

WCC's main campus sits at an elevation of 500 ft (152 m), off of Grasslands Road in Valhalla, just north of White Plains. In 1780, this location was the site of the Battle of Young's House, a surprise attack by British and Hessian troops on American soldiers. The attack occurred at what was then called Young's Corners (now Knollwood and Grasslands roads) at Young's Tavern. When the troops marched off the fields, they encountered a group of American colonists, some the victims of smallpox, who were buried alive in snowdrifts. The land later belonged to the founder of Kensico Cemetery, Reiss Carpentar. He died in 1910, after being the victim of a swindle, and the land was then acquired by Joseph Daly. Daly used the property largely for breeding horses, and he later sold it to John Hartford.

A master plan for the college was completed in 1961, with plans for the buildings on campus. The plan included 8 buildings, and they were to be finished by 1988: the Engineering Technologies building (1962), the Student Center (1963), the Physical Education building (1964), the Classroom building (1967), the Learning Resource Center (1969), the Science building (1978), the Academic Arts building (1981), and the Administration building (1988). The Mount Kisco architecture firm of Kaeyer, Parker & Garment designed the Science, Academic Arts, and Administration buildings. The Administration building was originally to have four floors, according to the master plan, but was scaled back to three after funding from the county and the New York State Dormitory Authority was reduced due to inflation.

The Learning Resource Center was renamed the Harold L. Drimmer Library in 1994, after a longtime chairman of the college's board of trustees. The library was completely renovated and expanded in 2002, at a cost of $15 million. The new design was carried out by the firm Lothrop Associates, which doubled the size of the building to over 100,000 square feet. The updated building contains not only library facilities, but also computer training labs, a student lounge, and conference rooms. The building's architect, Aaron B. Schwarz of Perkins Eastman architects, incorporated as much natural lighting as possible into the new design. The building's facade has stones similar to the original Learning Resource Center building, to better match the existing look on campus. Schwarz received a Design Award in 2003 for the building, from the Westchester/Mid-Hudson chapter of the American Institute of Architects. A more recent addition was the Gateway Center which functions as a unique resource on the campus, housing the college's Business Programs, Professional Development Center, and multi lingual programs. The design of this building was made by Ennead Architects, and structurally engineered by Leslie E. Robertson Associates. This building has won two awards; National Winner, AISC Ideas2 Award (2011), and Excellence in Structural Engineering, SEAoNY (2011).

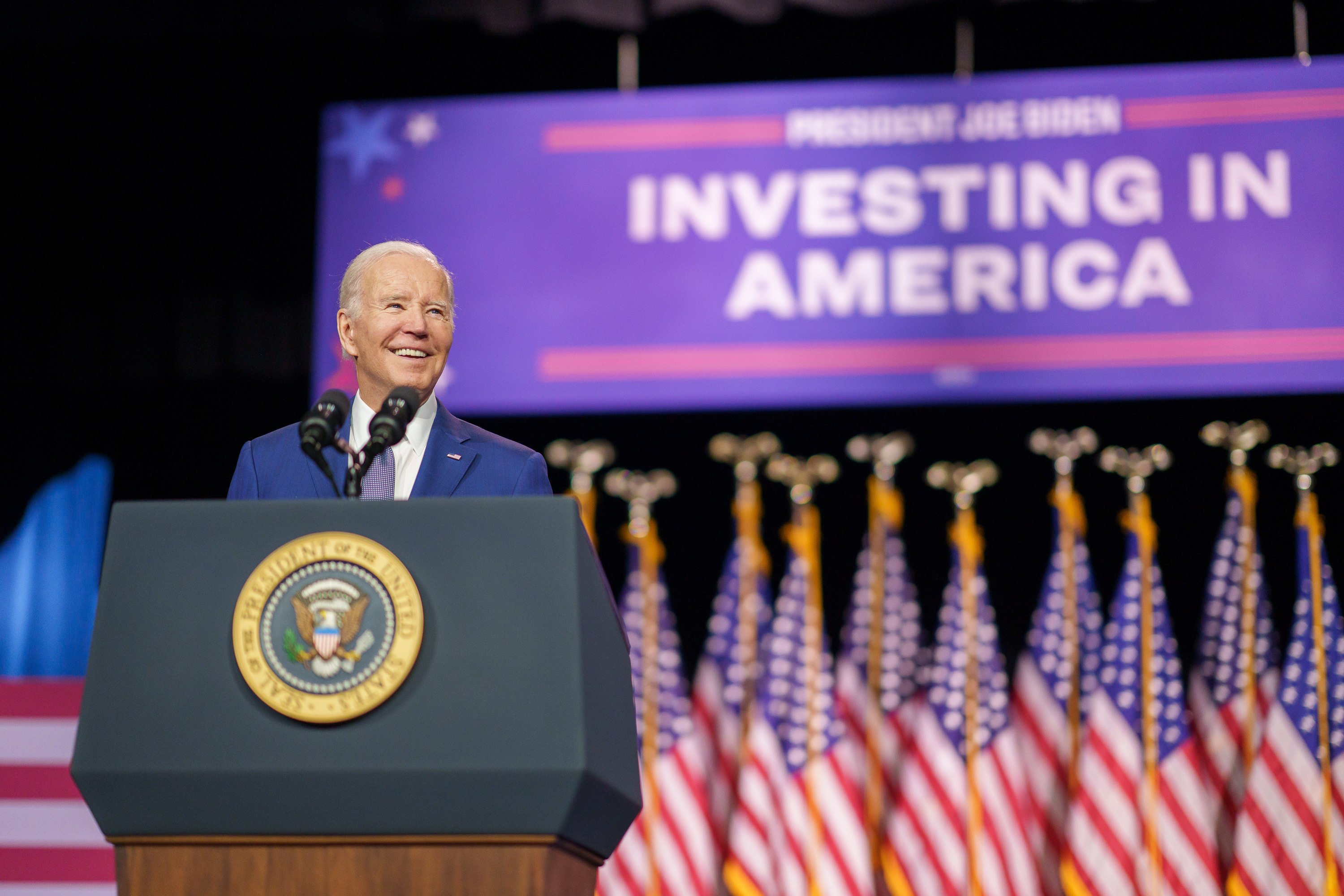
President Joe Biden, pictured in 2023 at the Hankin Academic Arts Building on Valhalla campus

=== Extension sites ===
In addition to the Valhalla campus, the college provides instruction at twelve other off-campus locations including extension centers in Peekskill, Ossining, White Plains, Mount Vernon, and Yonkers. In addition, it offers classes in Shrub Oak, New Rochelle, Mahopac and Port Chester. Other classes for programs such as "Mainstream" (for mature adults) are offered at various locations throughout the county. The Educational Opportunity Center is in Yonkers.

=== Native Plant Center ===
The Native Plant Center (NPC), a non-profit project of the Westchester Community College Foundation, is an affiliate of the Lady Bird Johnson Wildflower Center in Austin, Texas. The NPC, with the goal to educate the community on the value of native plants, presents various educational programs including workshops and conferences, is responsible for two demonstration gardens on the main campus, offers trips to gardens and horticultural displays, and coordinates an annual plant sale.

=== Westchester Center for the Arts ===
The Westchester Gallery is located in the Westechester Community College Center for the Arts in the County Center in White Plains. Located in the entryway of the Center for the Arts, the gallery hosts professional local, regional, and national artists, as well as the center's yearly faculty and student art exhibitions. Exhibitions at the gallery are frequently accompanied by talks, lectures, and presentations from the featured artists, and draw audiences from around the county.

== Academics ==
The college offers three associate degrees: associate of arts, associate of science, and associate of applied science.

The college's curriculum is registered and approved by the New York State Education Department and offers associate degrees in forty areas and certificates in twenty. Courses are offered during spring and fall semesters as well as two sessions during the summer. In addition to courses leading to associate degrees or certificates, the college offers non-credit courses. The student body numbers 12,000.

== Student life ==
Extracurricular and co-curricular activities at Westchester Community College includes a student run programming board called the Westchester Events Board (WEB), who plans major social events; and cultural events.
