= George Ludlum Hartford =

Chairman and treasurer of the Great Atlantic and Pacific Tea Company

- Born: November 7, 1864; Brooklyn, New York City, New York
- Died: September 23, 1957 (aged 92); Montclair, New Jersey
- Education: Saint Benedict's Preparatory School
- Occupation: Great Atlantic and Pacific Tea Company
- Title: Chairman and treasurer
- Spouse: Josephine Burnet Logan
- Parent(s): George Huntington Hartford; Marie Josephine Ludlum
- Relatives: John Augustine Hartford (brother); Edward V. Hartford (brother); Huntington Hartford (nephew)

George Ludlum Hartford (November 7, 1864 – September 23, 1957) was the longtime chairman and treasurer of the Great Atlantic and Pacific Tea Company (A&P), serving in those positions for over 40 years from 1916 until his death. He was the successor to his father, George Huntington Hartford (1832–1917) and led the company with his younger brother, John Augustine Hartford (1872–1951). Under the terms of their father's will, the two brothers had total control of the company's voting stock as long as either was alive. "Mr. George" as he was known to distinguish him from his father, "Mr. Hartford", was considered the "financial genius" at the firm who balanced his brother, "Mr. John" who was the firm's "merchandising power". They built the chain into the world's largest retailer with annual sales of $4.5 billion in 1957 when George died. Time magazine interviewed John and his brother George who were on their cover in November 1950. The Wall Street Journal in an editorial on August 29, 2011, wrote "Together the brothers, neither of whom had finished high school, built what would be, for 40 years, the largest retail outlet in the world." The New York Times in an editorial on September 7, 2011, wrote that John and George Hartford "were among the 20th century’s most accomplished and visionary businessmen".

Raised in Orange, New Jersey, George Jr. started his career at A&P after finishing high school. In the mid-1880s, he made an early mark on the firm by proposing that the company sell baking soda at the company's tea and coffee stores. This started a trend to add additional items that ultimately resulted in A&P becoming the first chain of grocery stores. As the company expanded into the largest retailer, George focused on finance and basic management. He was the voice of caution balancing his more outgoing brother. After John died in 1951, George exercised sole control of the company. While A&P continued to report record sales and profits during the rest of his life, the company made mistakes that ultimately lead to the loss of its position in the 1970s as the leading supermarket operator.

His personal life was also conservative and George did not marry until he was in his 40s. His wife, Josephine Burnet Logan (1861-1944) was a widow and they moved to Montclair, New Jersey, where they lived with her daughter, Mabel. Despite his position as the company's chairman, he was largely unknown to the public and even in the company except among a small group of senior executives. "To immortalize outstanding American merchants", Joseph Kennedy in 1953 commissioned a bronze bust of George's father George Huntington Hartford, four times life size along with seven other men, which would come to be known as the Merchandise Mart Hall of Fame in Chicago.

== Life and career ==
Hartford was born in Brooklyn and was the second child and first son of George Huntington Hartford (1832–1917) and Marie Josephine Ludlum (1837–1935). George Sr. was a bookkeeper for the recently formed Great American Tea Company, a retailer of tea and coffee in Manhattan that ultimately became the "Great Atlantic and Pacific Tea Company". Two years later, he was promoted to cashier and the family moved to Orange, New Jersey. At age 13, George Jr. started working for A&P on evenings and weekends while attending Saint Benedict's Preparatory School in Newark, New Jersey. 1878 became a momentous year for the Hartford family when A&P's founder, George Gilman retired and left the management of the 70 store chain to George Hartford Sr., who now received half of the profits from the company. Hartford Sr. was also elected mayor of Orange, New Jersey, and served in that position until 1890. George Jr. finished school and started working for the company full-time as a cashier in a nearby store in Newark, New Jersey.

In the early 1880s, A&P only sold tea, coffee and sugar at their stores, and the concept of a chain grocery store had not yet emerged. Young George convinced his father to add baking powder to the product line, starting the company down the path to increase the number of items offered until ultimately A&P's became the first chain to operate grocery stores. By labeling the product under the company's name, George also started the trend of chain stores marketing products under their own private labels. Over the next decade, the company added other private labeled products such as condensed milk, spices, and butter. By the end of the century, the firm's sales reached $5 million from 198 stores as well as its mail order and wagon route operations.

In 1901, George Gilman died and George Sr. negotiated a settlement with the estate that allowed him to control all of the voting stock and eventually repurchase the preferred shares from the Gilman heirs. The Hartfords moved aggressively to expand the enterprise, opening a new store every three weeks. In 1907 or 1908, George Hartford Sr. divided management responsibilities among his sons with George Jr. controlling finance and John directing sales and operations. The two ran the company as a team for over 40 years. In 1912, John proposed to create small economy stores to cut costs and increase volume by offering low prices. The concept was successful and by 1915 the chain operated over 1,600 stores. When George Sr. retired in 1916, George Jr. became Chairman in addition to Treasurer.

George Jr. lived with his parents until 1908 when he married a widow, Josephine Burnet Logan (1861 - 1944) and moved to Montclair, New Jersey. George and Josephine raised her daughter, Mabel and did not have additional children. He was a private individual who lived modestly despite his wealth. George never had a passport and did not travel except to vacation on the New Jersey shore. He rarely attended social events. His one passion was automobiles, which he took apart and reassembled to see how they worked. George also drove himself to his office.

After World War I, A&P rapidly expanded and by 1925 operated 13,961 stores with sales of $400 million and profit of $10 million. John convinced George to decentralize management into regions but George insisted that headquarters retain control of finances, real estate and purchasing policy, the areas he personally managed. The company introduced larger "combination stores" including space for meats, produce and dairy as well as traditional grocery items and launched a new drive to reduce costs. By 1930 the company's 16,000 stores reached sales of $1 billion.

Because George was opposed to borrowing and John insisted on maintaining low costs and prices, A&P was in excellent position to weather the Depression and reported even higher sales and profits. A&P's success strengthened the opposition of small independent grocers and their political allies. In 1935, Texas Congressman Wright Patman introduced legislation to place a significant federal tax on each chain store. If adopted, this legislation would have put A&P out of business. George and John Hartford took the unusual step of publishing a long letter pointing out that the effect of Patman's legislation would be a significant increase of food prices. The tide of public opinion turned against the bill.

Meanwhile the supermarket revolution was taking place in grocery retailing. A few operators experimented with large self-service supermarkets that proved successful. A&P held back until 1936 when the brothers agreed to try the concept. By 1938, the chain operated 1,100 of the larger stores. The chain continued to rebuild itself so that by 1950 A&P operated 4,000 supermarkets and 500 smaller combination stores. Sales reached $3.2 billion with an after tax profit of $32 million.

George and his brother John were deeply hurt when they were convicted in Federal Court in 1945 for criminal violations of the antitrust laws. President Roosevelt's antitrust division charged that the combination of the company's manufacturing, distribution and retail operations, if unchecked, would drive all competition out of business. The company countered that its market share was only in the 15% range and that its low cost strategy had resulted in a significant improvement in that nation's nutrition and standard of living. The court agreed with the government and fined each of the brothers $10,000. In 1949, the U.S. Court of Appeals upheld the decision and the antitrust division asked the court to break up the company Thousands of letters poured into the Justice Department supporting the company and the Hartford brothers gave extensive interviews with Time which put them on the magazine's November 13, 1950, cover. The case dragged on until the more business friendly Eisenhower administration that dropped its demands to break up the company.

John Hartford died suddenly in 1951 and was replaced by the company's longtime secretary, Ralph Burger. Now in his 80s, George remained as A&P's chairman and treasurer. Burger was a strong staffer who lacked John Hartford's strategic marketing skills. A&P continued to report record sales but made strategic mistakes that would ultimately cost the company its leadership position in 1974.

In 1957, George L. Hartford died at his home and was buried in Montclair next to his wife. Because he was the last survivor of his siblings, his father's trust was dissolved. Most of his estate was left to the John A. Hartford Foundation.

== See also ==
- A&P Canada
- Great Atlantic was one of the comparator companies in the book Good to Great
- John A. Hartford Foundation
