= George Gilman =

American businessman

- Born: George Francis Gilman c. 1826; Waterville, Maine, US
- Died: March 3, 1901 (age 75); Bridgeport, Connecticut, US
- Known for: The Great Atlantic and Pacific Tea Company (A&P)
- Partner: George Huntington Hartford

George Francis Gilman (c. 1826 – March 3, 1901) was an American businessman. A native of Waterville, Maine, he moved to New York City when he joined his father's leather tanning business. By age 30, he had his own leather business in New York. After his father died, Gilman decided to enter the more respectable tea and coffee business and started what would ultimately become The Great Atlantic and Pacific Tea Company, better known as A&P.

Gilman had a flair for marketing and pioneered many sales techniques that are now commonplace retailing. Initially he opened stores in New York City and also operated a nationwide mail order business selling tea and coffee. In 1871, he opened a store in Chicago, Illinois and within a few years operated stores in 16 cities.

In 1878, Gilman retired to his mansion in Bridgeport, Connecticut where he became known as an eccentric. The firm was operated by George Huntington Hartford who had been responsible for the company's business affairs. Under the unwritten understanding, Hartford received half of the profits. Gilman never had children and died without a will. Hartford asserted in court that he was entitled to half of the company and Gilman's estate agreed to a settlement that allowed Hartford to ultimately buy out the Gilman interests.

== Biography ==
Born in Waterville, Maine, George Gilman came from a wealthy family that traced its ancestry back to the Mayflower. George's father, Nathaniel Gilman was a successful privateer and embargo runner during the War of 1812. Nathaniel entered the New York City leather trade in 1834 and formed Gilman, Small and Company in an area known as the swamp two blocks east of city hall. Eventually the company operated three leather warehouses in the city and relocated the tannery upstate. The forerunner of A&P was founded by George Gilman in the mid-1850s as Gilman & Company to continue his father's leather tanning business. In 1858, Gilman built his own warehouse at 98 Gold Street in Manhattan. The business also had an office in St. Louis, Missouri.

Gilman's father died in 1859 without a will, resulting in litigation that was not settled for 50 years. That year, George Gilman's firm entered the tea and coffee business using the storefront at his Gold Street warehouse. One source speculates that Gilman decided to enter a more respectable business in light of his wealth. In May 1861, Gilman turned over his tanning business to his brother Winthrop and George moved his tea business to 129 Front Street. Initially, Gilman & Company was a wholesaler. In early 1863 the firm became a retailer calling itself the Great American Tea Company. Quickly, Gilman opened five stores and moved his office and warehouse to 51 Vesey Street.

Gilman proved to be a master at promotion. One source referred to Gilman as "in the mold of P. T. Barnum." Another source characterized Gilman as a "flambouyant, incurable high-flyer." The A&P Historical Society describes early stores as "resplendent emporiums" painted in vermilion and equipped with a large gas light T sign. Interiors included crystal chandeliers, tin ceilings, and walls with gilt-edged Chinese panels. A clerk stood behind a long counter to serve customers (self-service did not become common until the 1930s) and the cashier's station was shaped like a Chinese pagoda. In 1865, Gilman located his coffee roasting plant at Broadway and Bleecker Street in the prime Manhattan shopping and entertainment district so that the smell of roasting coffee encouraged sales.

The business quickly expanded by advertising low prices. The firm was able to offer low prices by acting as both the wholesaler and retailer. Gilman also built a nationwide mail order business. In 1869, the transcontinental railroad was completed; Gilman starting using the trade name Great Atlantic & Pacific Tea Company to market the then-new concept of prepackaged tea under the Thea-Nector brand. The tea company continued to use the Great American name for mail order purposes. In 1871, A&P introduced another marketing concept when it offered premiums with the purchase of coffee and tea at its stores.

While Gilman continued to provide the marketing concepts, he came to rely on the management skills of George Huntington Hartford (1833–1917). Hartford worked for the tanning company in the St. Louis office and joined Gilman & Company in New York as a clerk in 1861. He was later promoted to bookkeeper, then cashier in 1866. Contrary to the founding myth promoted by his sons, Hartford was not a founder of A&P. However; by 1871 Hartford was in a position of authority and was dispatched by Gilman to open a store in Chicago after the Great Chicago Fire. This was A&P's first store outside New York City. By 1875, A&P had stores in 16 cities.

In 1878, Gilman retired and left the active management of the firm to Hartford. By then, the firm operated 70 lavishly equipped stores and a mail order business with combined annual sales of $1 million ($33,362,069 today). Gilman lived at his mansion in Bridgeport, Connecticut where he entertained extensively. At one point, he owned 39 horses and 35 carriages. When his house burned in 1894, he replaced it with a larger 20-room mansion that included numerous bathrooms. After his wife died the next year, Gilman became even more eccentric by removing all clocks and mirrors so he would not be reminded that he was becoming older. He "adopted" at least two younger women to keep him company.

Gilman never had children and died from nephritis in March 1901 without a will, starting a legal battle among his numerous heirs. Hartford asserted that in 1878, Gilman give him half of the company in an unwritten partnership agreement. Evidence provided to the court established that Hartford received half of A&P's profits since 1878 and that all of the company's leases were in his name. The heirs realized that without Hartford, the firm would quickly become unprofitable. Therefore, they agreed to a settlement where the company was incorporated at $2.1 million. Under this agreement, the Gilman heirs received $1.25 million in preferred shares paying 6% per year while Hartford received $700,000 in common stock and the remainder of the preferred shares. This gave Hartford control of all of the voting stock. Over the years, Hartford was also able to repurchase the preferred shares from the Gilman heirs.
