= George Huntington Hartford =

American politician (1833–1917)

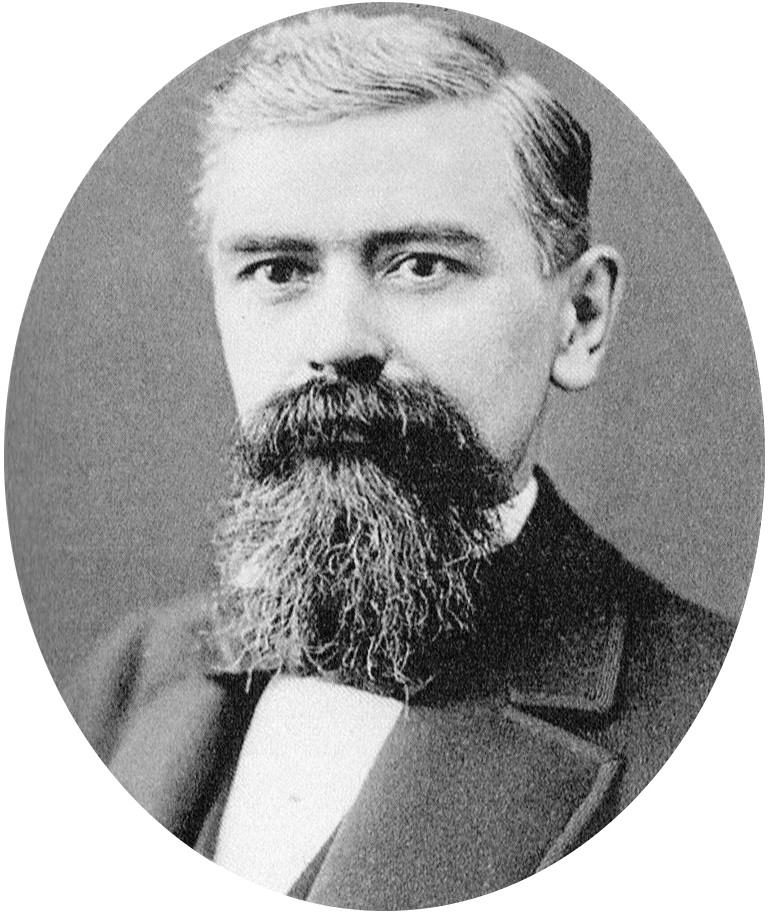
- Hartford in the mid-1870s
- Born: September 5, 1833; Augusta, Maine, U.S.
- Died: August 29, 1917 (aged 83); Spring Lake, New Jersey, U.S.
- Resting place: Rosedale Cemetery
- Known for: The Great Atlantic and Pacific Tea Company
- Spouse: Marie Josephine Ludlum
- Children: Maria Josephine Clews; George Ludlum Hartford; Edward V. Hartford; John Augustine Hartford; Marie Louise Hoffman
- Parent(s): J. Brackett Hartford; Martha Soren

George Huntington Hartford (September 5, 1833 – August 29, 1917) headed the Great Atlantic and Pacific Tea Company (A&P) from 1878 to 1917. During this period, A&P created the concept of the chain grocery store and expanded into the country's largest retailer. He joined the firm as a clerk in 1861 and quickly assumed managerial responsibilities. When A&P's founder, George Gilman, retired in 1878, Hartford entered into a partnership agreement and ran the company until the founder's death in 1901. In the settlement of Gilman's estate, Hartford acquired control of the company and ultimately purchased the interests of Gilman's heirs.

Hartford was born on a farm in Augusta, Maine, and started his retail career at age 18 in Boston. By 1861, he lived in Brooklyn, New York, where he married Marie Josephine Ludlum (1837–1925). They had three sons and two daughters. Although he was known to be a private person, Hartford was elected mayor of Orange, New Jersey, in 1878 and served for 12 years. Hartford retired from the active management of the business about 1907 or 1908 and turned the firm over to two of his sons, George Ludlum Hartford (1864–1957) and John Augustine Hartford (1872–1951). He continued as an advisor while they expanded the firm, which had become the country's largest retailer by 1915.

Hartford died in 1917, aged 84, and was interred at Rosedale Cemetery, in Orange, New Jersey. Hartford's estate was worth $125 million. The press respected that he was a private man, and there were few obituaries about him. "To immortalize outstanding American merchants", Joseph Kennedy in 1953 commissioned a bronze bust of Hartford, four times life size, along with seven other men, in what came to be known as the Merchandise Mart Hall of Fame in Chicago.

By 1930, A&P operated approximately 16,000 stores and became the first retailer to report combined revenue of US$1 billion. The Time magazine published on November 13, 1950, had Hartford's sons George and John on its front cover. Time wrote, "the familiar red-front A & P store is the real melting pot of the community, patronized by the boss's wife and the baker's daughter, the priest and the policeman. To foreigners A & P's vast supermarkets are among the wonders of the age; to the US middle class, they are one of the direct roads to solvency. 'Going to the A & P' is almost an American tribal rite."

Time also wrote in 1950, "Of every dollar the U.S. spends on food, about 10¢ is passed over A & P counters—a massive yearly total of $2.9 billion. Next to General Motors, the A&P sells more goods than any other company in the world." The New York Times, in an editorial on September 7, 2011, wrote that Hartford's sons George and John "were among the 20th century's most accomplished and visionary businessmen". The Wall Street Journal, in an editorial on August 29, 2011, wrote, "Together the brothers, neither of whom had finished high school, built what would be, for 40 years, the largest retail outlet in the world."

== Biography ==
George Hartford's family came to New Hampshire in the late 1600s when Nicholas Hartford immigrated from Hertfordshire, England. George's grandfather moved to Augusta, Maine in 1796 and settled on a farm where their son, Joshua Brackett Hartford married Martha Soren and had two sons, George and his younger brother, John. Joshua and Martha operated a boarding house and livery stable that is now the site of a firehouse in Augusta. George received minimal formal education and at age 18 sailed to Boston, Massachusetts, where he worked as a dry goods store clerk. The company founding myth is that George Hartford and George Gilman started A&P in New York City in 1859. However, the 1859 St. Louis, Missouri directory lists George and his brother John Hartford as employees of Gilman's leather tanning firm which was based in New York but had an office in St. Louis. By 1860, the Hartford brothers returned to Augusta, Maine where John was listed in the census as a merchant and George as a box maker. Shortly after the census, John moved to New York City, where he is listed in the city directory with George Gilman in the tea importing business that ultimately became A&P. There is no known record of George Hartford in New York prior to 1861. While John Hartford quickly left the firm, George joined Gilman as a clerk by 1861; he later was promoted to bookkeeper, then cashier in 1866.

Gilman was a master at promotion and the business quickly expanded by advertising low prices. In addition to the stores in New York, Gilman also built a nationwide mail order business. During this period, Hartford's role continued to grow and in 1871 he was responsible for expanding A&P to Chicago after the Great Chicago Fire. A&P's first store outside New York City was opened within days after the disaster. By 1875, A&P had stores in 16 cities. Three years later, Gilman retired and left the active management of the firm to Hartford. By then, the firm operated 70 lavishly equipped stores and a mail order business with combined annual sales of $1 million.

In July 1861, George married Marie Josephine Ludlum of Goshen, New York. They had two children: Maria Josephine Hartford (1862 - 1941) and George Ludlum Hartford (1864 - 1957) while in Brooklyn. After his promotion to cashier in 1866, Hartford moved his family to Orange, New Jersey where they had three additional children; Edward Vassallo Hartford (1870 - 1922), John Augustine Hartford (1872 - 1951) and Marie Louise Hartford (1875 - 1927). When the incumbent Mayor decided not to seek reelection in 1878, the local Democratic organization experienced difficulties finding a candidate and ultimately asked George Hartford. As a Catholic, Hartford was acceptable to the large Irish and German immigrant communities, and as a businessman, he appealed to many Republicans. Mayor Hartford was a progressive, building schools, installing electric lighting and starting a municipal water system. The burning issue during the period was temperance and in 1888, the Mayor shut down saloons operating illegally on Sunday. That action generated substantial opposition within the Democratic Party and in 1890 Hartford was defeated.

About 1880, A&P started selling sugar in its stores and continued aggressive growth. By 1884, the firm operated stores as far west as Kansas City and south as Atlanta. The company also operated wagon routes to serve rural customers. About this time, two of Mr. Hartford's sons, George L. Hartford and John A. Hartford joined the firm. Company lore is that George convinced his father to expand the product line to include A&P branded baking powder. Over the next decade, the company added other A&P branded products such as condensed milk, spices, and butter. As it expanded its offerings, the tea company was gradually creating the first grocery chain. By the end of the century, the firm had sales of $5 million from 198 stores as well as its mail order and wagon route operations. However, other new grocery chains were expanding more rapidly and blanketing their respective territories while the tea company's stores were spread over a much larger area. The firm quickly found itself at a disadvantage.

The middle son, Edward V. Hartford served the firm as secretary after graduating from Stevens Institute of Technology, but never was active in the company day to day. Edward invented the automobile shock absorber and established a successful automobile parts manufacturer. His son, Huntington Hartford developed Paradise Island, Bahamas, founded the Gallery of Modern Art in New York City, and was one of the world's wealthiest men in the 1960s.

In 1901, George Gilman died without a will, starting a legal battle among his numerous heirs. Mr. Hartford stepped into the battle by asserting that in 1878, Gilman give him half of the company in an unwritten partnership agreement. Evidence provided to the court established that Hartford received half of A&P's profits since 1878 and that all of the company's leases were in his name. The heirs realized that without Hartford, the firm would quickly become unprofitable. Therefore, they agreed to a settlement where the company was incorporated at $2.1 million. Under this agreement, the Gilman heirs received $1.25 million in preferred shares paying 6% per year while Hartford received $700,000 in common stock and the remainder of the preferred shares. This gave Hartford control of all of the voting stock. Over the years, Hartford was also able to repurchase the preferred shares from the Gilman heirs. At the end of the litigation, A&P only ranked fifth nationally and the Hartfords moved aggressively to rebuild the enterprise. The chain opened one store every three weeks and expanded the wagon routes to over 5000.

In 1907 or 1908, George Hartford Sr. divided management responsibilities among his sons with George Jr. controlling finance and John directing sales and operations. The two ran the company as a team for over 40 years. The younger Hartford moved aggressively to expand the company and by 1912, A&P operated 400 stores. Food prices were a political issue in that year's presidential race and a few chains experimented with a low cost no frills format. After long debate, the elder Hartford and his first son, George agreed to John's proposal to experiment with a low cost economy store. Capitalized at only $3,000 including its initial inventory, the store operated with only a manager and eliminated fancy fixtures and premiums. The company quickly expanded the concept and by 1915 the chain operated 1600 stores.

George Hartford Sr. died in 1917 and left his estate to a one generation trust equally divided among his five children. He was buried in Rosedale Cemetery in Orange, New Jersey. The Trust was administered by his sons George and John who exercised control over the company's stock. As a result, the company's leadership remained constant until the two brothers died in the 1950s. The Hartford family would retain controlling interest in the company until 1979.

Bronze busts honoring Hartford and seven other merchants stand between the Chicago River and the Merchandise Mart in downtown Chicago. In 1953, the busts were commissioned by the owner of the building, Joseph Kennedy, the father of President John F. Kennedy.

== Business contributions ==
George Hartford revolutionized retailing. A&P reduced prices and made profit by heavy advertising and promotion. The company was one of the first marketers to use brand names when it started selling tea under the Thea Nectar label. This marketing decision came to pass after A&P faced a lawsuit against the creators of Cream of Wheat that were angered at A&P for attempting to undercharge for their product. Gilman and Hartford purchased damaged tea that cost relatively little and mixed it to create a black tea with a green tea taste that was considered by the public a specialty tea. In turn A&P was then able to sell Thea Nectar for less than the competitor's special tea. For customers who could not reach one of their stores, the company provided "tea clubs", where groups of people – either as a social group or as a business – could have tea shipped to them from the A&P for a third of the price. The tea clubs proved immensely popular, eliciting orders from Vermont to Wisconsin. The company also offered incentives to its customers, such as premiums. Based on the amount of product purchased, the customer received a gift from the A&P. Eventually, these premiums became based on stamps that were collected with each purchase and could be turned in for anything from lithographs to glassware. In the 1870s, Hartford expanded the company by opening stores outside of New York. During the next decade, Hartford and his sons expanded the product line to create the first chain grocery stores. Despite its size, A&P was run like a small family business and promotions exclusively took place from within the company. Hartford also instituted a pension plan that allowed employees to invest in company stock that they could retain after retirement.

== See also ==
- The Great Atlantic and Pacific Tea Company
- A&P Canada
- Great Atlantic was one of the comparator companies in the book Good to Great
- John A. Hartford Foundation
