= Huntington Hartford =

American businessman (1911–2008)

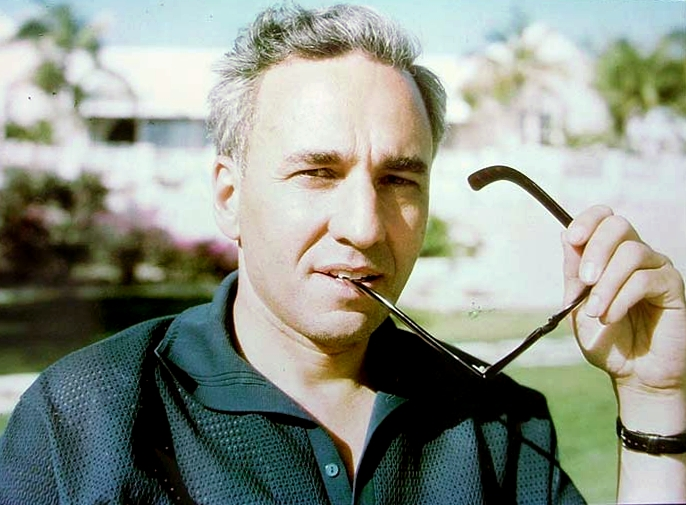
- Hartford in 1968
- Born: George Huntington Hartford II; April 18, 1911; New York City, U.S.
- Died: May 19, 2008 (aged 97); Lyford Cay, Bahamas
- Resting place: Lakeview Memorial Gardens & Mausoleums
- Education: St. Paul's School
- Alma mater: Harvard University
- Occupations: Heir to the Great Atlantic and Pacific Tea Company fortune, philanthropist and businessman
- Spouses: Mary Lee Epling (m. 1931; div. 1939) Marjorie Steele (m. 1949; div. 1960) Diane Brown (m. 1962; div. 1970) Elaine Kay (m. 1975; div. 1981)
- Children: 4
- Parents: Edward V. Hartford; Henrietta Guerard Pollitzer
- Relatives: Josephine Hartford Bryce (sister); George Huntington Hartford (grandfather); George Ludlum Hartford (uncle); John Augustine Hartford (uncle)

George Huntington Hartford II (April 18, 1911 – May 19, 2008) was an American businessman, philanthropist, stage and film producer, and art collector. He was also heir to the A&P supermarket fortune.

After his father's death in 1922, Hartford became one of the heirs to the estate left by his grandfather and namesake, George Huntington Hartford. After graduating from Harvard University in 1934, he only briefly worked for A&P. For the rest of his life, Hartford focused on numerous other business and charitable enterprises. He owned Paradise Island in the Bahamas, and had numerous other business and real estate interests over his lifetime including the Oil Shale Corporation (TOSCO), which he founded in 1955.

Hartford was once known as one of the world's richest people. His final years were spent living in the Bahamas with his daughter, Juliet.

== Early life and education ==
Huntington Hartford was born in New York City, the son of Henrietta Guerard (Pollitzer) and Edward V. Hartford (1870–1922). He was named George Huntington Hartford II for his grandfather, George Huntington Hartford. His father and uncles, John Augustine Hartford and George Ludlum Hartford, privately owned the A&P Supermarket, which at one point had 16,000 stores in the U.S. and was the largest retail empire in the world. In the 1950s A&P was the world's largest grocer and, next to General Motors, it sold more goods than any other company in the world. Time magazine reported that A&P had sales of $2.7 billion in 1950. His maternal grandfather was from an Austrian Jewish family, and his maternal grandmother, who was Protestant, had deep roots in South Carolina. Hartford's father was a successful inventor and manufacturer who perfected the automotive shock absorber. Along with his brothers, Edward was also an heir to the A&P fortune and served as A&P's corporate secretary as well as one of three trustees that controlled A&P's stock.

After Hartford's birth, the family moved to Deal, New Jersey, a wealthy community on the Atlantic shore. After Huntington's father died when he was 11, his mother moved the family to a mansion in Newport, Rhode Island, known as "Seaverge" next to Rough Point, the mansion owned by tobacco heiress Doris Duke. The family also lived on a 1,000-acre (4.0 km^{2}) plantation in South Carolina called "Wando" as well as an apartment on Fifth Avenue in Manhattan.

After his father died in 1922, Hartford's mother sent him to St. Paul's School. He later majored in English literature at Harvard University. After his graduation from Harvard in 1934, he went to work at A&P headquarters in New York in the statistical department. He lived on a trust fund that generated about $1.5 million per year.

On 10 November 1936, he purchased the sailing ship Joseph Conrad from Alan Villiers which he converted to a private yacht, and donated to the U.S. Maritime Commission as a sail training ship in 1939.

== Career ==
In 1940, Hartford invested $100,000 (equivalent to approximately $2,298,100 in 2025) to help start a newspaper, PM, with Marshall Field III and worked as a reporter for the publication. An avid sailor, he donated his yacht to the Coast Guard at the start of World War II. During the war he was commissioned in the Coast Guard and commanded the Army supply ship FS-179, commissioned in May 1944, in the Pacific Theater. Hartford twice accidentally ran the ship aground.

After the war, he moved to Los Angeles and attempted to purchase Republic Pictures and RKO Studios from Howard Hughes. Huntington also started a modeling agency and an artists' colony, and opened a theater.

In the 1950s, Hartford purchased a penthouse duplex on the 13th and 14th floors of One Beekman Place in the 1950s after moving from an apartment at the River House in New York City. He owned a home called "Pompano" on 240 El Vedado Drive in Palm Beach, a 150-acre (0.61 km^{2}) estate in Mahwah, New Jersey, called "Melody Farm", a 160-acre (0.65 km^{2}) Hollywood estate known as "The Pines" (also known as Runyon Canyon Park), a townhouse in London, a home in Juan-les-Pins in France, and a house on Paradise Island in the Bahamas.

Hartford owned Huntington Hartford Productions which produced several films including the Abbott and Costello film, Africa Screams, in 1949. In 1950, Hartford produced Hello Out There, the last film of James Whale, the acclaimed director of the 1931 version of Frankenstein. He produced several films starring Marjorie Steele and encouraged her to become an artist.

In 1955, Hartford founded the Oil Shale Corporation, later known as Tosco, and was its majority shareholder and chairman. Tosco was later acquired by ConocoPhillips. He also set up the Denver Research Institute at the University of Denver to find alternate methods of oil extraction. During this period, he also wrote and produced The Master of Thornfield, a stage adaptation of Jane Eyre that ran for two weeks in Cincinnati starring Errol Flynn as Mr. Rochester. This partnership led to Flynn staying in Hartford's pool-house briefly in 1957–58 and is the origin of a legend that "The Pines" was Flynn's estate. Later, Hartford produced the play on Broadway. In 1963, Hartford offered The Pines as a gift to the city but was turned down by Mayor Sam Yorty.

When his uncle George Ludlum Hartford died in 1957, the trust set up by the elder George Huntington Hartford was liquidated and Hartford inherited his portion of the estate. The Chicago Tribune estimated his wealth in 1969 as half a billion dollars. In 1959, Mike Wallace introduced him on a television interview as being worth half a billion dollars.

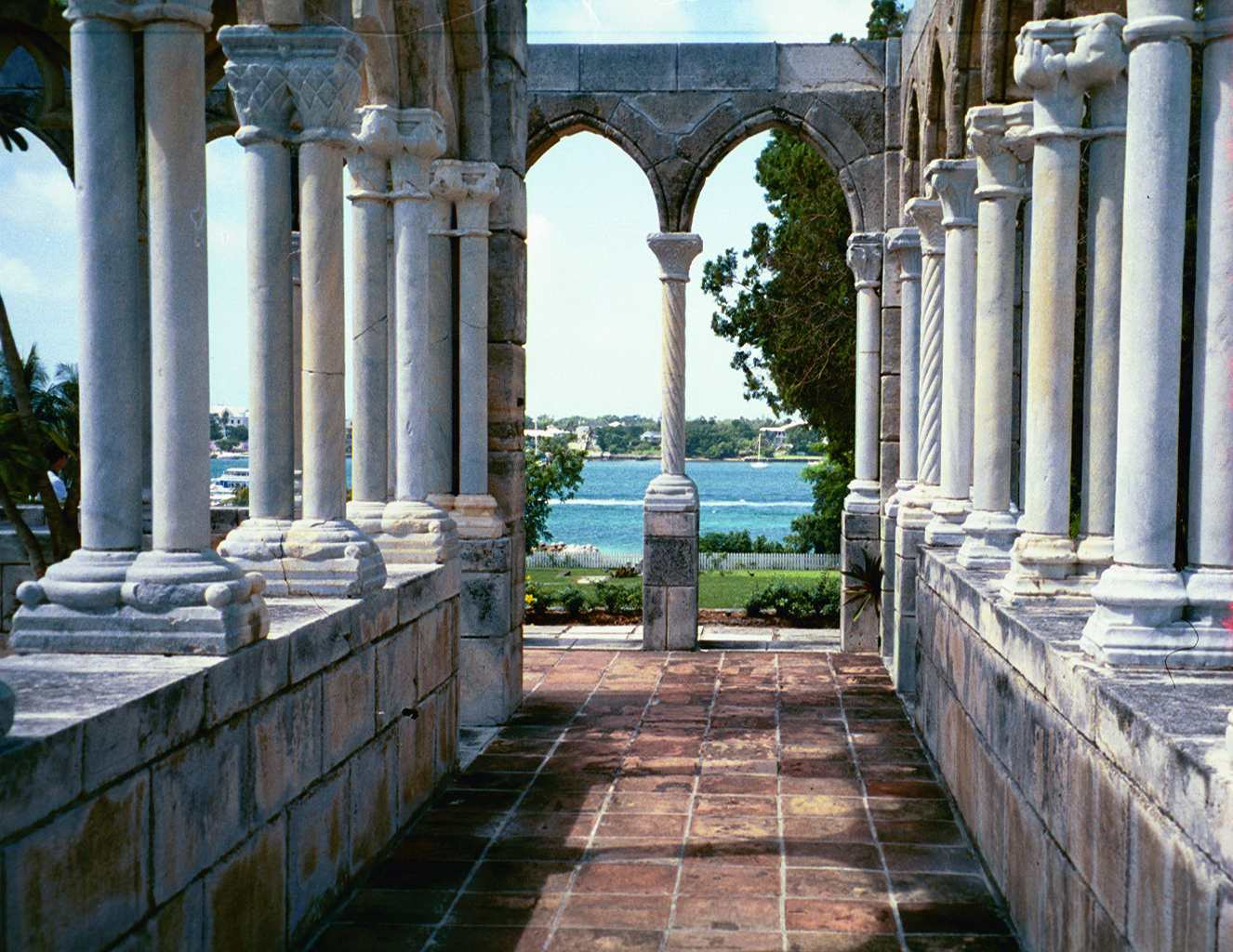
14th-century French cloisters reassembled by Hartford on Paradise Island

In 1959, Hartford bought Hog Island in the Bahamas, renaming it Paradise Island. He developed it over the next three years hoping to turn it into another Monte Carlo. One feature of his Ocean Club was a cloister built from the disassembled stones of a monastery that William Randolph Hearst had stored in a Florida warehouse. In an interview with David Frost on British television, Hartford stated that the flag he created for Paradise Island was in the shape of a "P" and that he wanted to put it on the moon as a symbol of peace for the world. Hartford was responsible for getting the gambling license for Paradise Island by hiring Sir Stafford Sands, a Bahamian lawyer.

In 1969, Hartford produced the Broadway show Does a Tiger Wear a Necktie?, which opened at the Belasco Theater starring the then-unknown actor Al Pacino. Pacino won a Tony for his performance.

=== Patronage of the arts ===
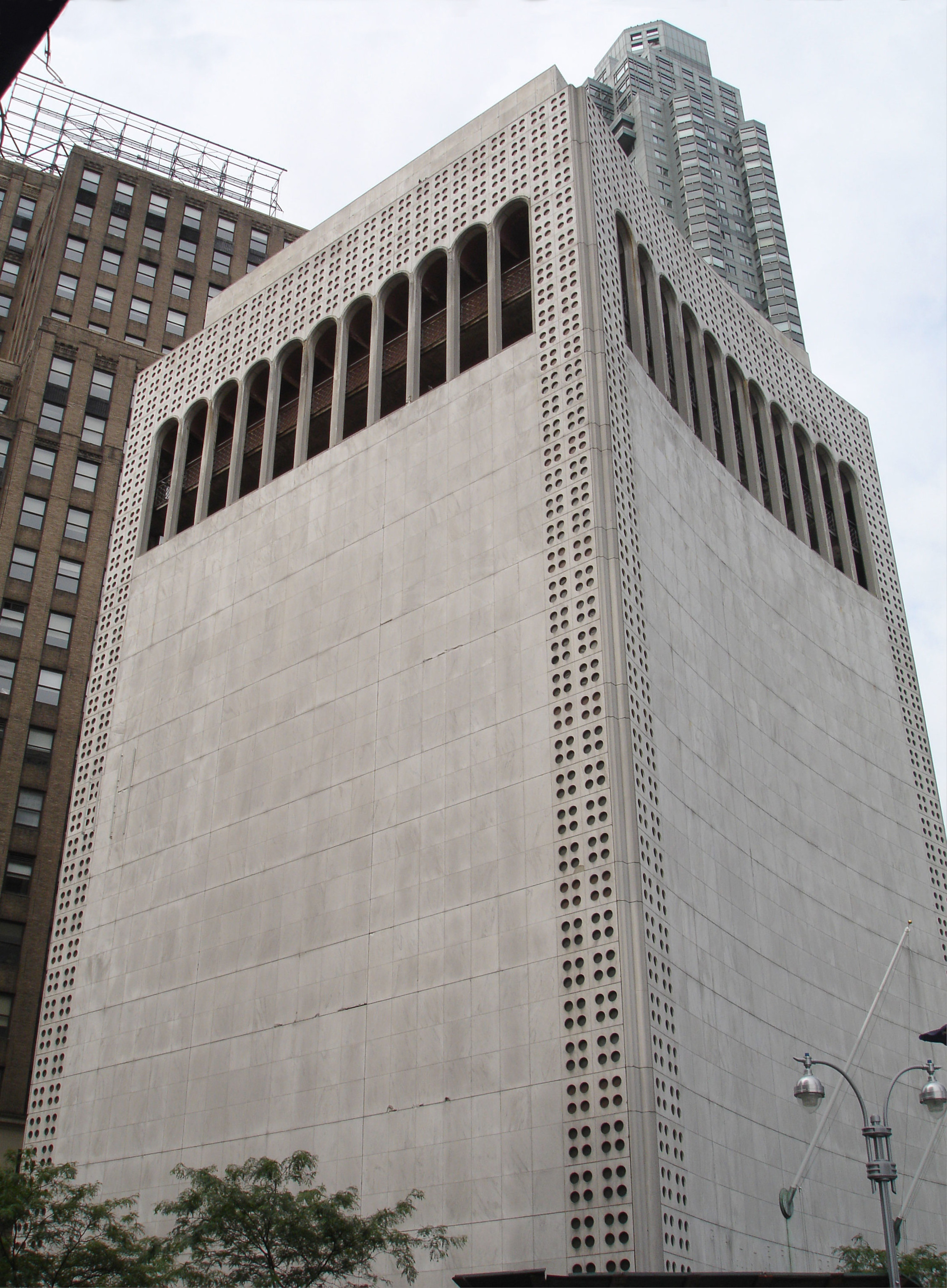
Huntington Hartford funded the Gallery of Modern Art at 2 Columbus Circle

Hartford was a patron of the arts, building an artists colony above Los Angeles and later a gallery in New York City, and his opinions on the arts were equally strong. He criticized Abstract Expressionists, believing they had ushered in a great "ice age of art," freezing out the grand traditions of music, painting and sculpture; he described Pablo Picasso as a "mountebank". Beyond expressionism, he derided the "beatnik, the Existentialist, the juvenile delinquent, the zaniest of abstract art, the weirdest aberrations of the mentally unbalanced, the do-nothing philosophy of Zen Buddhism" as a result of wanton "abuse of liberty and freedom." He had strong opinions against the work of Tennessee Williams, T. S. Eliot, and Willem de Kooning, as well as art dealer Sidney Janis.

To support the art that he enjoyed, Hartford built an artists' colony in the upper part of the geographical area of Rustic Canyon, high above the Pacific Palisades neighborhood of Los Angeles in the mountains. Buying more than 150 acres of what was previously known as Murphy Ranch and Camp Josepho in 1948, he hired Lloyd Wright (son of Frank Lloyd Wright) to adapt existing structures and design new ones. When it opened in 1951, it had more than a dozen cottages and a central dining room for distinguished artists, composers and craftspeople who won scholarships for one to six-month retreats. For nearly 15 years, more than 400 colony artists generated international success with exhibitions, concerts, theater performances and Pulitzer Prizes; included among them were composers Ernst Toch, Norma Wendelburg, and Ruth Shaw Wylie, writer and activist Max Eastman, and painter Edward Hopper.

Hartford also renovated and opened a theater which he renamed the Huntington Hartford Theater, which opened in 1954. For ten years the Hartford Theater was Los Angeles's premier venue for Broadway-scale productions featuring the stars of the time.

Hartford's taste for Los Angeles began to wane, however, after the Los Angeles County Museum of Art rejected an exhibition he proposed. He decided to build his own museum in New York City, the 1964 Gallery of Modern Art on Columbus Circle, declaring that building a museum in Los Angeles was like putting up "a theater in Oklahoma" due to a lack of audience. With the financial commitment to a new museum in New York and tiring of his art colony, he asked local government officials and wealthy patrons to contribute to the colony's support. Lacking what he felt would be sufficient commitment, he shut down the colony in 1965 (he had sold the Huntington Hartford Theater in 1964).

=== Art collection ===
Hartford owned an extensive art collection. In an interview by Edward R. Murrow on his show Person to Person he gave a tour of the collection at his Beekman Place apartment including Rembrandt's "Portrait of a man, half-length, with his arms akimbo", which sold at Christie's auction house in London on December 8, 2009, for $33 million, a world record for a Rembrandt.

To house his extensive collection of 19th- and 20th-century art, Hartford built the Gallery of Modern Art Including the Huntington Hartford Collection at 2 Columbus Circle in Manhattan which opened in 1964. Pointedly, it did not include Abstract Expressionism which Hartford panned in his book, Art or Anarchy. Hartford was a patron of the architect Edward Durell Stone who designed the modernist marble-clad structure often derided as the "lollipop building". Stone had previously designed the Museum of Modern Art for the Rockefeller family.

Hartford commissioned Salvador Dalí to paint The Discovery of America by Christopher Columbus for the museum's opening. The museum also included Hartford's paintings by Monet, Manet, Degas, and Henri de Toulouse-Lautrec. Hartford closed the museum after five years. Later the building housed the New York City Department of Cultural Affairs and was recently rebuilt with a new facade to house the Museum of Arts and Design.

== Personal life ==
Hartford was married four times, all ending in divorce, and had five children. His mother intended Huntington to marry Doris Duke, but in April 1931, Huntington married Mary Lee Epling, the 18-year-old daughter of a dentist from Covington, Virginia. They divorced in 1939. In 1938, Huntington had a son, Edward "Buzzy" Barton, with dancer Mary Barton. Hartford supported the boy financially but refused to legally acknowledge him as his son. In 1967, Edward Barton died of a self-inflicted gunshot wound to the head.

Huntington's second wife was Marjorie Steele, an aspiring actress whom Hartford married in 1949. The couple had two children, Catherine (born 1950) and John Hartford (born 1953 or 1954). The couple divorced in 1960. Catherine Hartford died of a drug overdose in June 1988. John Hartford later became a musician and music teacher. He died of throat cancer on April 15, 2011.

In 1962, Hartford married Diane Brown at Melody Farm in Mahwah, New Jersey. They had a daughter, Cynara Juliet, before divorcing in 1970. Five years later, he married Elaine Kay. They divorced in 1981.

== Later years and death ==
In February 2004, he and his daughter moved to Lyford Cay in the Bahamas.

Hartford died at his home in Lyford Cay on May 19, 2008, at the age of 97. The cause of his death was not publicly released. His remains are interred at Lakeview Memorial Gardens & Mausoleums in Nassau.

== In popular culture ==
- Hartford was portrayed by John McMartin in the 2004 film Kinsey, directed by Bill Condon.
- Hartford's Ocean Club, situated on Paradise Island, was featured in two James Bond films: Thunderball, in 1965, and Casino Royale in 2006. His then-wife, Diane Brown, has a cameo in Thunderball as the woman James Bond (Sean Connery) briefly dances with at the "Kiss Kiss" Club in Nassau, and in Casino Royale as a card player at the Ocean Club.
