= Inserra Supermarkets =

American supermarket chain

Inserra Supermarkets Inc. is a supermarket chain operating in the northeastern United States. The company is a member of the Wakefern retailers' cooperative and does business as ShopRite and PriceRite. Inserra Supermarkets is headquartered in Mahwah, New Jersey, and operates approximately 23 stores. It is a family-owned business and is one of the 500 largest private companies in the United States. The chairman and CEO of Inserra Supermarkets is Lawrence R. Inserra Jr.

== See also ==
- ShopRite (United States)
- Wakefern Food Corporation
- PriceRite
