= Waldbaum's =

Defunct American supermarket chain (1904–2015)

- Type: Private; Subsidiary
- Industry: Retail; Grocery
- Founded: 1904 in Brooklyn, New York
- Founder: Sam Waldbaum; Wolf Waldbaum; Israel "Izzy" Waldbaum
- Defunct: 2015
- Fate: Bankruptcy
- Headquarters: 2 Paragon Drive, Montvale, New Jersey, United States
- Area served: New York City; Long Island; Westchester County, New York; Ulster County, New York; Rockland County, New York; Connecticut; New Jersey; Massachusetts
- Parent: The Great Atlantic & Pacific Tea Company
- Website: www.waldbaums.com

Waldbaum's was a supermarket chain with stores in the New York City boroughs of Brooklyn, Queens, Staten Island, and the Bronx; and in Nassau, Suffolk, Westchester, Rockland counties and Upstate New York. The chain also for a time operated stores in New Jersey, Connecticut, and Massachusetts. Founded in 1904, Waldbaum's was one of seven "banner store chains" owned and operated by The Great Atlantic & Pacific Tea Company (A&P), which acquired the chain from its founding family in 1986.

Waldbaum's operated full-service traditional supermarkets with varying footprints and store models and its popular marquee in certain aisles along with good food and reliable service. At its peak in the 1980s, it was the 12th largest supermarket chain in the United States and had 140 stores throughout the New York metropolitan area. All Waldbaum's stores featured fresh meats and produce. 62 stores had bakeries and 36 offered pharmacy service. As with other A&P-branded stores, Waldbaum's offered in-house products under the America's Choice, America's Choice Kids, America's Choice Gold, Two-Forks Bakery, Green Way, Via Roma, Food Basics, Home Basics, Great Atlantic Seafood Market, Mid-Atlantic Country Farms, Woodson & James, Hartford Reserve, Food Emporium Trading Co., Preferred Pet and Live Better brands.

== History ==
=== Ownership under the Waldbaum family ===
In 1904, two brothers, Sam and Wolf Waldbaum, Jewish immigrants from the Galician region of Ukraine, opened a store in Brooklyn. Their nephew, Israel "Izzy" Waldbaum, came to America and joined the business. The three men ran the store, with Izzy taking over the grocery when his uncles retired. Izzy married Julia Leffel; they had three children. The company made history in 1938, when African American identical twin brothers, Ernest and George Brown, who started working at one of the only two existing stores at the time as stockboys were promoted to checkout boys. "It was unheard of then for a colored checker to be in a white neighborhood," Ernest Brown said three decades later in an interview. Both Browns later became store managers and, eventually, Waldbaum executives (vice-president and assistant vice-president, respectively).

When Izzy died in 1948, his son Ira Waldbaum left his studies at New York University and took over the company's six stores in Brooklyn. Izzy's wife Julia Waldbaum played an active part in the company and served as its secretary. From the 1960s onward, her picture and her recipes appeared on almost all of the company's 400 private-label products.

By 1951, the company had opened its first supermarket in Flushing, Queens and net sales reached $55.2 million by 1960. In 1961, the company went public by selling shares of common stock, though the Waldbaum's family still owned a majority of the shares. By this time, Waldbaum's had 25 stores and sales of $80 million. In 1970, the company bought the Food Mart chain in Connecticut and Massachusetts.

On August 2, 1978, a fire was reported at the store in Sheepshead Bay, Brooklyn, which was undergoing renovations at the time. The roof collapsed as firefighters were attempting to vent the building, killing six firefighters and injuring over 30. Investigators arrested 21-year old neighborhood man named Eric Jackson, who was charged with arson and six counts of murder. He was convicted and sentenced to twenty-five years to life in state prison. However, later evidence showed that the fire had been caused by an electrical failure and that the prosecution had both withheld information from the defense team and manufactured evidence against Jackson. In 1988, a new trial was ordered and in 1994 the jury returned an acquittal.

In March 1979, a Waldbaum's store in the East Flatbush neighborhood of Brooklyn was the site of an armed robbery. The three gunmen held 40 shoppers in the store for three and a half hours before surrendering to the police.

In 1984, Waldbaum's pleaded no contest to price fixing charges after the company was accused of conspiring with Pathmark and King Kullen chains on joint ''double-couponing'' promotions. Waldbaum's paid a fine of $700,000. After years of in-house advertising, the company hired the D'Arcy Masius Benton & Bowles ad agency with a $5 million budget in 1988.

=== Purchase by A&P ===
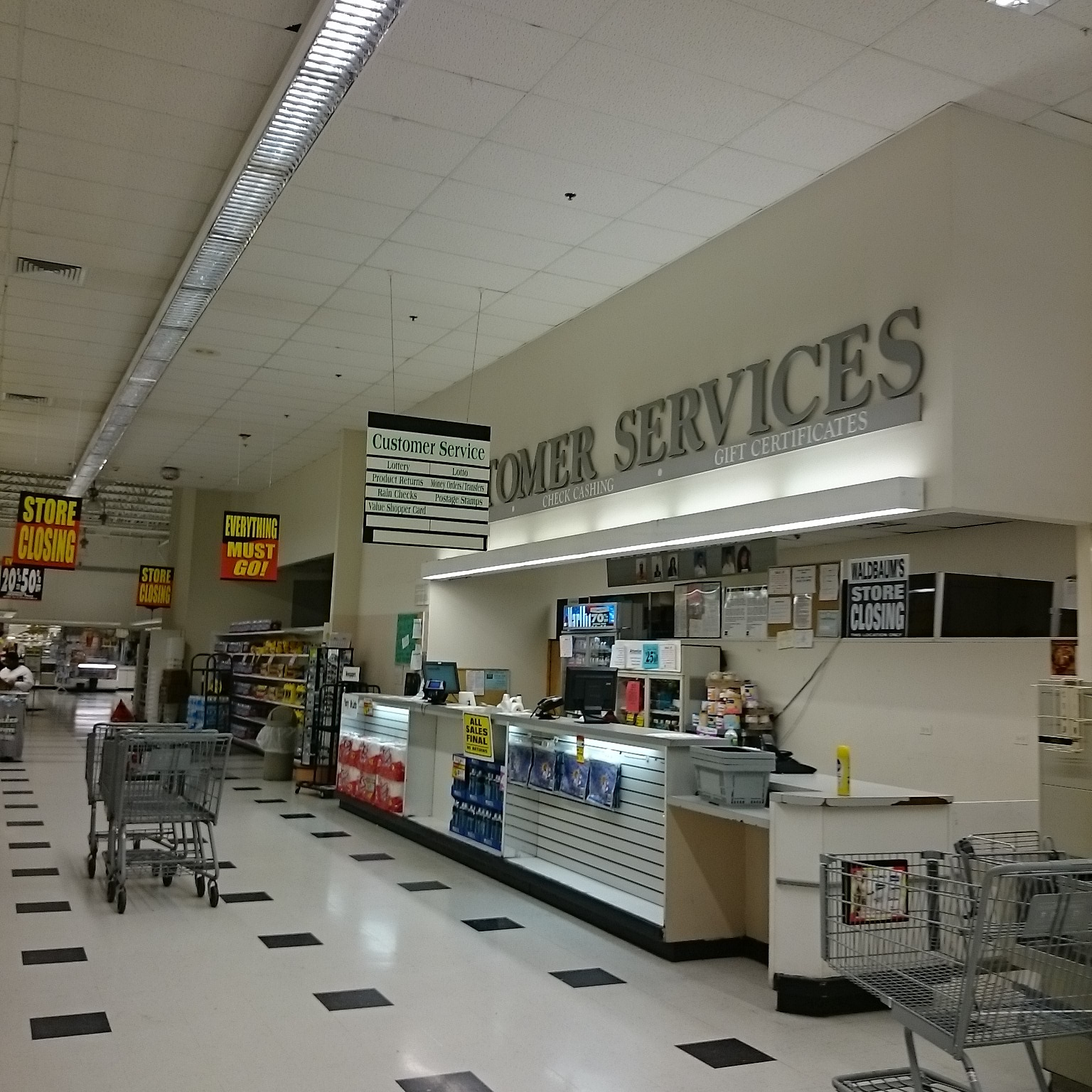
The East Meadow Waldbaums location on its last days during bankruptcy

In November 1986, Waldbaum's sold controlling interest in the company to The Great Atlantic and Pacific Tea Company. Following the sale, the Waldbaum family continued to manage the stores.

Waldbaum's introduced a shop-at-home service in 1989, where customers can call in their order and get it delivered. In January 1996, 14 people were injured when the roof of the Massapequa, New York Waldbaum's collapsed under the weight of snow during the historic blizzard of 1996.

Following the purchase of Pathmark in 2007, A&P was required to sell five Waldbaum's locations in Staten Island and Long Island to satisfy regulators over antitrust concerns.

In August 2010, A&P announced that it would close 25 stores as the parent of Waldbaum's began the implementation and execution phase of its comprehensive turnaround. In September, A&P announced it planned to lay off over 400 workers, including 195 employees from the closure of the West Hartford Waldbaum's store in Connecticut. The stores in Centereach and Levittown closed in October.

In December 2010, A&P filed for bankruptcy. In order to help turn around the business, A&P identified 32 locations for closure, including Waldbaum's stores in Farmingdale, Smithtown, and Valley Stream.

In January 2012, A&P announced six more stores would close in Commack, West Babylon, East Islip, Lake Ronkonkoma, Huntington Station and Rockville Centre. Waldbaum's parent company emerged from Chapter 11 bankruptcy protection as a private company in March 2012.

On July 20, 2015, A&P filed for a pre-packaged Chapter 11 bankruptcy, following years of financial loss and a struggle to compete with rival grocery chains. Three Waldbaum's stores in Carle Place, Riverhead, and Oceanside were set to close.

The company announced its intention to immediately sell 120 stores. Stop & Shop bought Waldbaum's locations in Bedford, East Hampton, Southampton, Baldwin, Massapequa, Long Beach, Huntington, Howard Beach, Belle Harbor, and Bay Terrace. Key Food bought stores in Moriches, Mattituck, Albertson, Flushing, Glen Head, Brooklyn, Jackson Heights, Glen Oaks, and Bayside. Five store locations were sold to Best Yet Market in November 2015, and three locations to Wakefern Food Corporation, owner of the ShopRite Food chain, with several other entities acquiring additional locations.

All Waldbaum's stores were sold or closed by November 2015. In December 2018, private equity firm American Legacy Brands purchased the intellectual property rights for A&P and Waldbaum's with the intention of licensing the names for private label lines.

== See also ==
- Joseph Waldbaum
