= Fairway Market =

American northeast grocery chain

Coordinates: 40.780597°N 73.981711°W

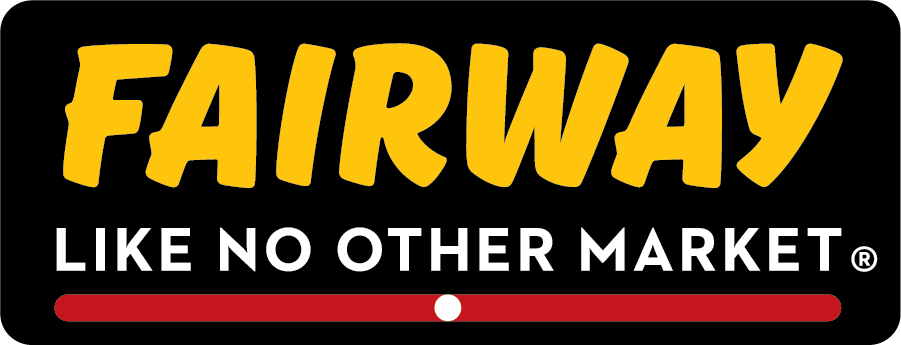

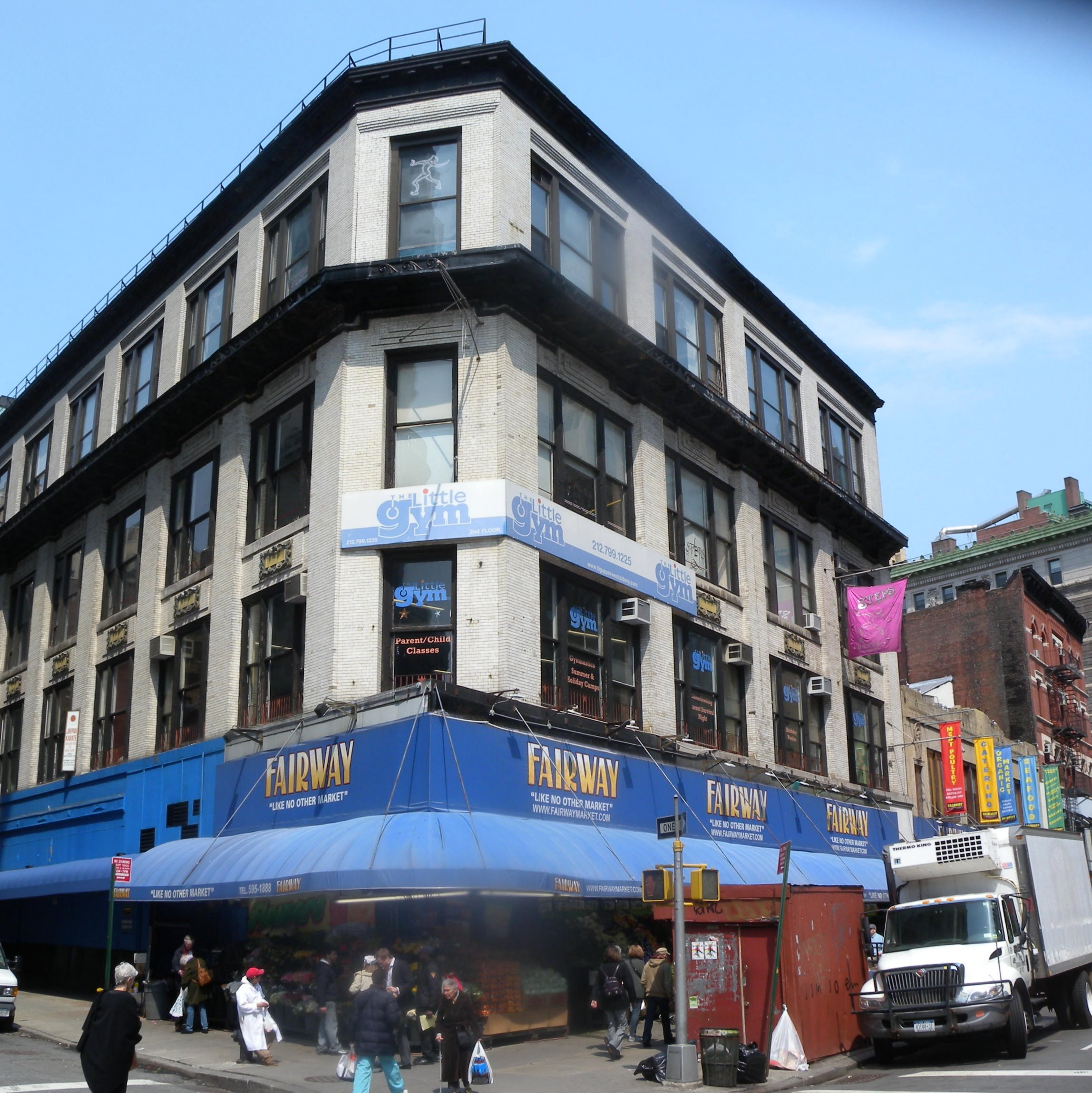
- Fairway's original store at Broadway and West 74th Street
- Company type: Division
- Traded as: Nasdaq: FWM
- Industry: Retail; Supermarket
- Founded: 1933; 93 years ago in New York City, New York, United States
- Founder: Nathan Glickberg
- Headquarters: 5000 Riverside Drive, Keasbey, New Jersey, U.S.
- Number of locations: 4 (2020)
- Area served: New York metropolitan area
- Revenue: $810 million
- Parent: Wakefern Food Corporation
- Website: fairwaymarket.com

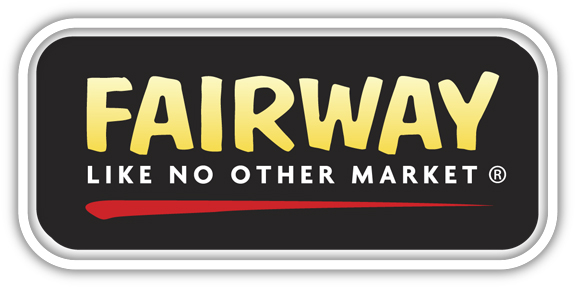
Previous logo

Fairway Market is an American grocery chain founded in 1933 by Nathan Glickberg in New York City. Following years of rapid growth, the chain experienced financial trouble after it was purchased by a private equity firm, and it filed for Chapter 11 bankruptcy in 2016. and again in 2020, when the chain dissolved and all but those four stores were closed. The brand was acquired by the Wakefern Food Corporation, whose flagship supermarket cooperative network is ShopRite. Four surviving stores continue to be operated by Wakefern cooperative member Village Super Markets, including the flagship location at Broadway and West 74th Street on the Upper West Side of Manhattan.

== Sale to private equity ==
Sterling Investment Partners, a private equity firm in Westport, Connecticut, bought a controlling stake in Fairway Market in January 2007 and expanded the chain in the Greater New York area. Sterling made a $150 million capital investment in Fairway.

In 2011, the chain had revenues of $550 million. It was spun off in an IPO on April 17, 2013, trading under its parent, Fairway Group Holdings Corp., on the NASDAQ under the ticker symbol "FWM". Sterling's push for rapid growth outside Fairway's upscale base on Manhattan's Upper West and East Sides, which led to price hikes and declining quality, has been blamed for the chain's collapse.

== History ==
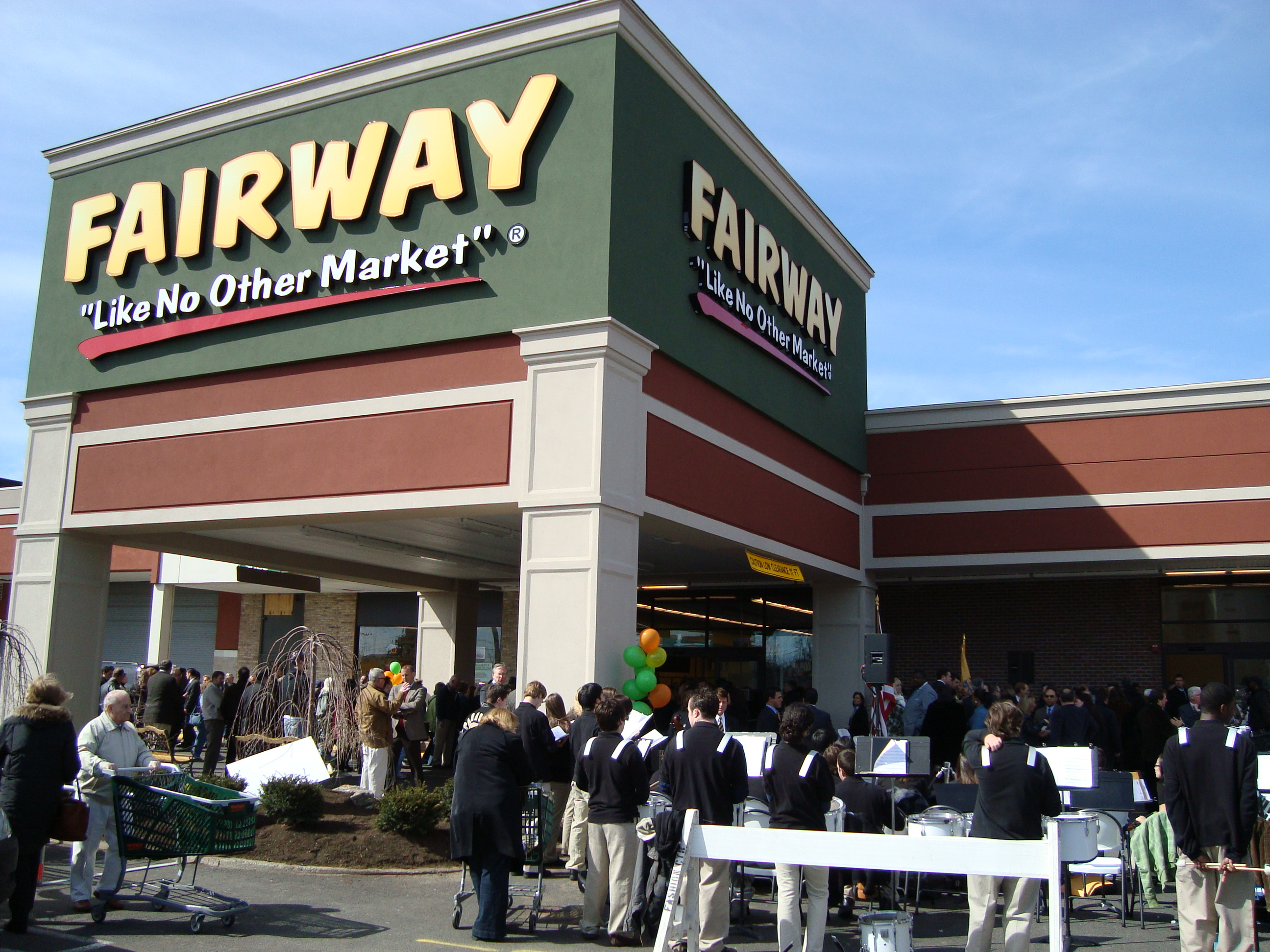
The grand opening of the Paramus Fairway store at Fashion Center in Paramus, New Jersey, 2009

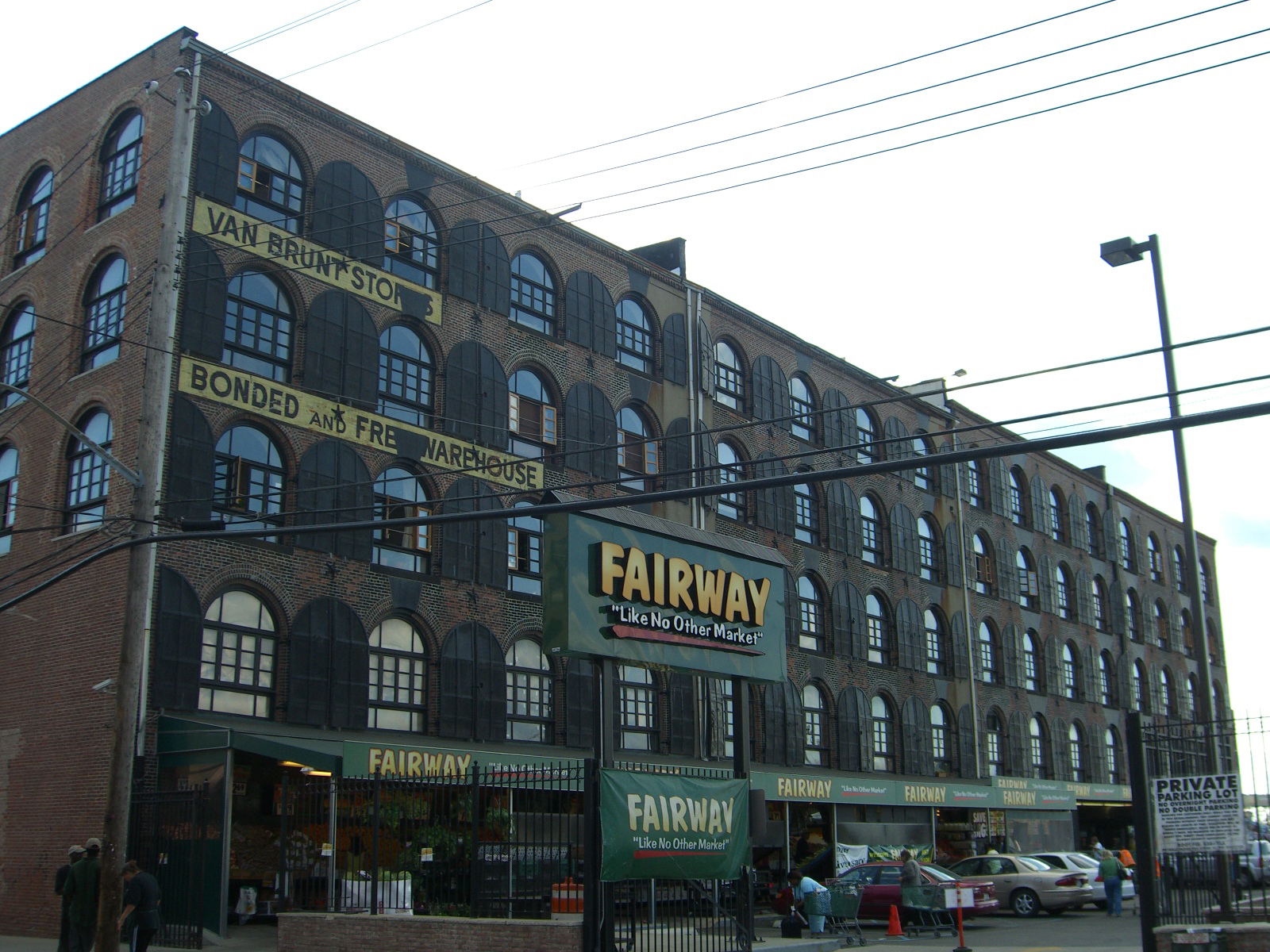
The Fairway in Red Hook, Brooklyn

The original Fairway Market at West 74th Street on Manhattan's Upper West Side was originally a produce shop. By 1997, it had expanded with a café that became a steakhouse at night.

In 2011, Fairway opened two more locations: one on the Upper East Side of Manhattan, which opened on July 20, and the other in the Douglaston neighborhood of Queens, which opened on November 16. In 2012, Fairway Market opened three more locations: in Woodland Park, New Jersey, on June 6; Westbury, New York, on August 22; and Kips Bay in Manhattan in late December. In 2013, Fairway Market opened a location in Chelsea, Manhattan, and another at The Shops at Nanuet shopping mall in Nanuet, New York.

As of 2020, all but five of these Fairway stores have either closed or sold to other retailers, including Amazon. The sequence of all stores is as follows:

- 1930s: The flagship store opened on Broadway on the Upper West Side.
- 1995: Fairway's Harlem store opened in a significantly larger space. This store had a 10,000-square-foot (930 m^{2}) enclosed space, known as the "Cold Room," which contained the store's meats, seafood, dairy products, and beer. Silver coats were available for customers who wished to keep warm while browsing the freezer. Without a bidder after the company's second bankruptcy, the store closed in July 2020.
- 2001: The company opened its first store outside the city in the Long Island community of Plainview.
- 2006: The company opened its fourth store in Red Hook, Brooklyn. In July 2020 this store was sold to Bogopa Service Corporation to be reopened as a Food Bazaar supermarket.
- 2009: On March 25, Fairway's fifth store opened in the Fashion Center shopping mall in suburban Paramus, New Jersey, taking up a majority of the mall's former interior space. This was the first Fairway store located west of the Hudson River and the first location ever to open in the entire state of New Jersey. In March 2020, it was announced that the Paramus location would close. The official closing date for the Paramus location was supposed to be May 15, 2020, but it was delayed to the summer of 2020 due to the effects of the COVID-19 pandemic. It was then replaced by an Amazon Fresh store.
- 2010: On April 14, Fairway opened a new branch in a former Kmart in the Westchester County village of Pelham Manor, directly across the border with the Bronx. This became Fairway's third location in the New York City suburbs and sixth overall. Fairway opened its first Wine and Spirit store adjacent to the market. The second wine and spirit superstore was opened adjacent to the Stamford market.
- 2010: In November, Fairway's seventh and largest location to date at over 80,000 square feet (7,400 m^{2}) opened in Stamford, Connecticut.
- 2011: Fairway opened a location on the Upper East Side of Manhattan on 86th Street, between Second and Third Avenues.
- Fairway also opened a location in Douglaston, Queens in 2011. In July 2020 this store was sold to Bogopa Service Corporation to be reopened as a Food Bazaar supermarket.
- 2012: In June, Fairway opened its tenth food store and third Wine and Spirits Store in Woodland Park, New Jersey, in a renovated former Pathmark Super Center store. The company closed this location on April 1, 2020, with the location being replaced by an Amazon Fresh market.
- 2012: In August, Fairway Market opened a 68,000-square-foot (6,300 m^{2}) store in the Roosevelt Raceway Center in Westbury, NY in August 2012. This location was subsequently replaced by a Food Bazaar.
- 2012: In December, Fairway opened their Kips Bay, Manhattan location on East 30th Street and Second Avenue.
- 2013: In July, Fairway Market opened their 13th store in Chelsea, Manhattan at Sixth Avenue on July 24, 2013.
- 2013: In October, Fairway opened their 14th store in Nanuet, New York, at The Shops at Nanuet mall on October 10, 2013. The store closed on September 25, 2019. It was then replaced by a Stop & Shop.
- 2014: Fairway Market opened a store in the DSW Plaza in Lake Grove, New York, on July 23, 2014. This store was the first Fairway Market location in Suffolk County on Long Island and the 15th food store in the metropolitan area. The company closed the store after only two years.
- 2017: In January, Fairway opened a store in a Georgetown strip mall. In March 2020, the store was sold to Key Food for $5 million.

In 2023, Fairway partnered with Instacart to launch a delivery service called Fairway Now that services three stores in the Manhattan area.

In 2024, Village Supermarkets, which acquired Fairway Market in 2020, opened a new store in Old Bridge, N.J. that features departments borrowed from Fairway Market's banners in New York City.
