= Westchester Dartman =

American criminal

The Westchester Dartman (or Westchester Darter) was an individual who shot at least 22 women with darts between July 1975 and December 1976 in Westchester County, New York, United States.

They are also believed to be responsible for a dart attack in Nanuet, Rockland County, in May 1977.

The perpetrator was never apprehended, and the statute of limitations on the crimes has since passed.

== Attacks ==
All of the victims were women and were usually shot through open windows at night in their ground-level apartments in Westchester County.

Only one victim was seriously injured: On June 23, 1976, a woman in Greenburgh was struck in her carotid artery, which required a lengthy operation and left her partially paralyzed.

At least three women were missed by the darts. In October 1975, a woman in a second-floor apartment in Yonkers was sitting by her window when she heard a "loud pop" and found a dart on her floor, which had torn through her window screen and bounced off the wall behind her. Another woman in Yonkers found a dart on the headboard of her bed on July 4, 1976.

The final reported attack in Westchester County occurred in Yonkers on the night of December 15, 1976. 23-year-old Susan Scaffidi was sewing a dress in her living room when a dart came through the bathroom window and struck her in the thigh.

On May 13, 1977, a woman was struck by a dart inside her home in Nanuet, Rockland County.

== Investigation ==
John De Leo, who headed the investigation, believed the attacks were sexually motivated: "It is an act against women, the inflicting of pain. The psychologists compare the penetration of the dart to intercourse." Psychologists also believed the man to be young, physically agile, and with a history of voyeuristic behavior.

Police questioned local sex offenders, people who had recently purchased darts, and people who had been arrested in the past for firing darts. The weapon used in the attacks was determined to be hand-pumped or gas-powered, and the darts were feather-ended, steel-tipped, and .177 caliber in size. No fingerprints or other reliable leads were found. By September 1976, the investigation was narrowed down to four suspects, none of whom would be arrested.

According to one investigator in 1990, police were "pretty sure" they knew who was behind the attacks but didn't have enough evidence to make an arrest.

Anthony Scarpino, the District Attorney of Westchester County, has stated his belief that the perpetrator was the Son of Sam, a serial killer who shot people at random in 1976–77 in New York City. Contemporary reports also considered the possibility. Lawrence Klausner, author of the 1981 book Son of Sam, dismissed the claims as "yellow journalism".

== See also ==
- Dart Man
