= Gerrity's Supermarkets =

Grocery store chain

- Company type: Private; family business
- Industry: Retail (Grocery)
- Founded: 1895; 131 years ago in Scranton, Pennsylvania, U.S.
- Founder: William Gerrity
- Headquarters: 950 N South Rd, Scranton, PA 18504, U.S.
- Number of locations: 10 (2022)
- Area served: Northeastern Pennsylvania
- Key people: Joyce A. Fasula; (President and CEO); Joseph F. Fasula; (CEO)
- Products: Bakery, delicatessen, dairy, grocery, frozen foods, organic foods, bulk foods, meat, produce, seafood, wine, beer, spirits, floral products, pet supplies, general merchandise
- Services: App Card; Gerrity's Delivers; Floral; Pharmacy
- Owner: Fasula family (100%)
- Number of employees: 1,250 (2022)
- Website: gerritys.com

Gerrity's Supermarkets is a privately held chain of grocery stores located in Pennsylvania, United States. The company is run by President and CEO Joyce A. Fasula, along with her son, Joseph F. Fasula. They were part of ShurSave's retail cooperative. In August 2022, the chain joined Wakefern Food Corporation's cooperative under The Fresh Grocer banner. Gerrity's Supermarkets is currently operating ten locations, including its 2021 acquisition of Valley Farm Market in Bethlehem.

== History ==
=== 1895–1964: Gerrity's Market ===
In 1895, William Gerrity opened Gerrity's Market, a meat shop that preceded the present-day supermarket. It was located at 345 Railroad Avenue, Bellvue, West Scranton. He partnered with Josph Hoban, and together they opened two other stores and started a meat delivery service. In 1945, Hoban sold his half of his business to Gerrity. Three years later, Gerrity's three sons, Joseph, William Jr., and Thomas inherited the stores. William Jr. moved and Thomas died, leaving Joseph the owner of Gerrity's Market. He decided to keep it open.

=== 1964–1979: Meat delivery service, fire, and reopening ===
The delivery service had grown all across Lackawanna County. Neal Fasula joined the company in 1964 and left in 1969 to pursue a job in New York City. Gerrity's Market burnt down after Fasula left. He returned to West Scranton and, along with Joe Gerrity, opened a new meat store. A few years later, Gerrity sold his half to Fasula, who decided to keep the Gerrity's name.

=== 1980–present: Gerrity's Supermarkets ===
The first Supermarket opened on 702 South Main Avenue, Scranton in 1980. It was remodeled in 1987 and still exists today. The supermarket became a family business as sisters Doxie and Rosemary, Mother "Aunt" Mary, and his wife Joyce (who became the chain's mascot) joined. In 1993, they opened stores in Kingston and in Keyser Oak Shopping Center in North Scranton in a former Woolworth. In 1994, they opened a store on Meadow Avenue in South Scranton, and in 1997, they opened five more. Neal would pass away during the now-chain's growth throughout Lackawanna and Luzerne Counties. The chain would partner with Rosie in to launch a grocery delivery service called Gerrity's Delivers and a gift card. In 2020, they partnered with Ace Hardware to open connected stores you could walk into from Ace/Gerrity's interior. The concept store opened in the Keyser Oak location. Gerrity's Ace opened in an abandoned Rent-A-Center, Northeast Title & Tag (with an FedEx Authorized Ship Center), and Thompson Northeast Insurance. Rent-A-Center had relocated to the Luzerne Street Shopping Center many years before, while Northeast Title & Tag and Thompson Northeast Insurance moved to a different space in the shopping center close to the street.

== Flagship location ==
In 2006, Gerrity's opened their flagship location at Hanover Mall in Hanover Township. The location had a sandwich/pizza shop called Aunt Mary's Kitchen, a florist, and a drive-thru pharmacy called Gerrity's Corner Drug Store. The store relocated from a different space in the township. In 2008, many stores were renovated with new décor and the current logo with the name in and outlines of grapes and an apple in pink. The exterior is pink with the word Gerrity's in white. The Keyser Oak location was also remodeled like the Hanover Township location.

== Locations ==
- 100 Old Lackawanna Trail Clarks Summit, PA
- 2280 Sans Souci Pkwy Hanover Township, PA (Flagship)
- 1782 Keyser Avenue North Scranton, PA (Located in Keyser Oak Shopping Center)
- 552 Union St Luzerne, PA
- 4015 Birney Ave Moosic, PA
- 320 Meadow Ave South Scranton, PA
- 702 South Main Street West Scranton, PA (original location)
- 801 Wyoming Ave West Pittston, PA
- 2020 Wyoming Ave Wyoming, PA
- 1880 Stefko Blvd, Bethlehem, PA 18017 (branded as Valley Farm Market; located in Stefko Blvd Shopping Center)
