= The MarketPlace =

Bermudan grocery store chain

The MarketPlace Limited
- Formerly: Piggly Wiggly
- Company type: Private
- Industry: Retail food
- Founded: 1939
- Founder: Crisson Family
- Headquarters: Hamilton, Bermuda
- Area served: Bermuda
- Key people: Pamela Ferreira (Owner), Seth Stutzman (President and CEO)
- Products: Groceries
- Owner: Pamela Ferreira
- Website: marketplace.bm

The MarketPlace Limited is a grocery store chain in Bermuda. As of 2024, it is the largest grocery store chain in Bermuda. It is owned by Pamela Ferreira, with Seth Stutzman as the president and CEO.

== History ==
The chain was founded by the Crisson Family in 1939, and was originally called Piggly Wiggly Limited, with each store having the name "Piggly Wiggly." In 1946 the company was purchased by the Pimental Family, and in 1950 was purchased by Mr. Fernance Perry.

In March 1979 Alvin Ferreira purchased the operations of the Piggly Wiggly Limited chain; since he already operated another store, the Modern Mart, the Piggly Wiggly Limited chain was expanded to five stores. In 1981, the chain was renamed The MarketPlace Ltd., with the five stores following suit.

In 1987 the chain acquired the A-1 Paget and A-1 Smith stores, so the chain now had seven stores. In 1994 the chain acquired the Shopping Centre Limited grocery store.

In the early 2000s, the chain entered into a franchise agreement with Wakefern Food Corporation's Price Rite, opening their first Price Rite store in 2007. In 2016 the chain opened a second Price Rite store, bringing their total store count to 10. The MarketPlace owns and operates both stores and hosts a separate website from Price Rite US.

== Activities ==
As of 2024, the chain owns and operates 10 stores. The corporate headquarters is located within the chain's Hamilton MarketPlace location, the largest grocery store in Bermuda.
