= Morton Williams =

American food retailer (founded 1952)

Morton Williams Supermarkets

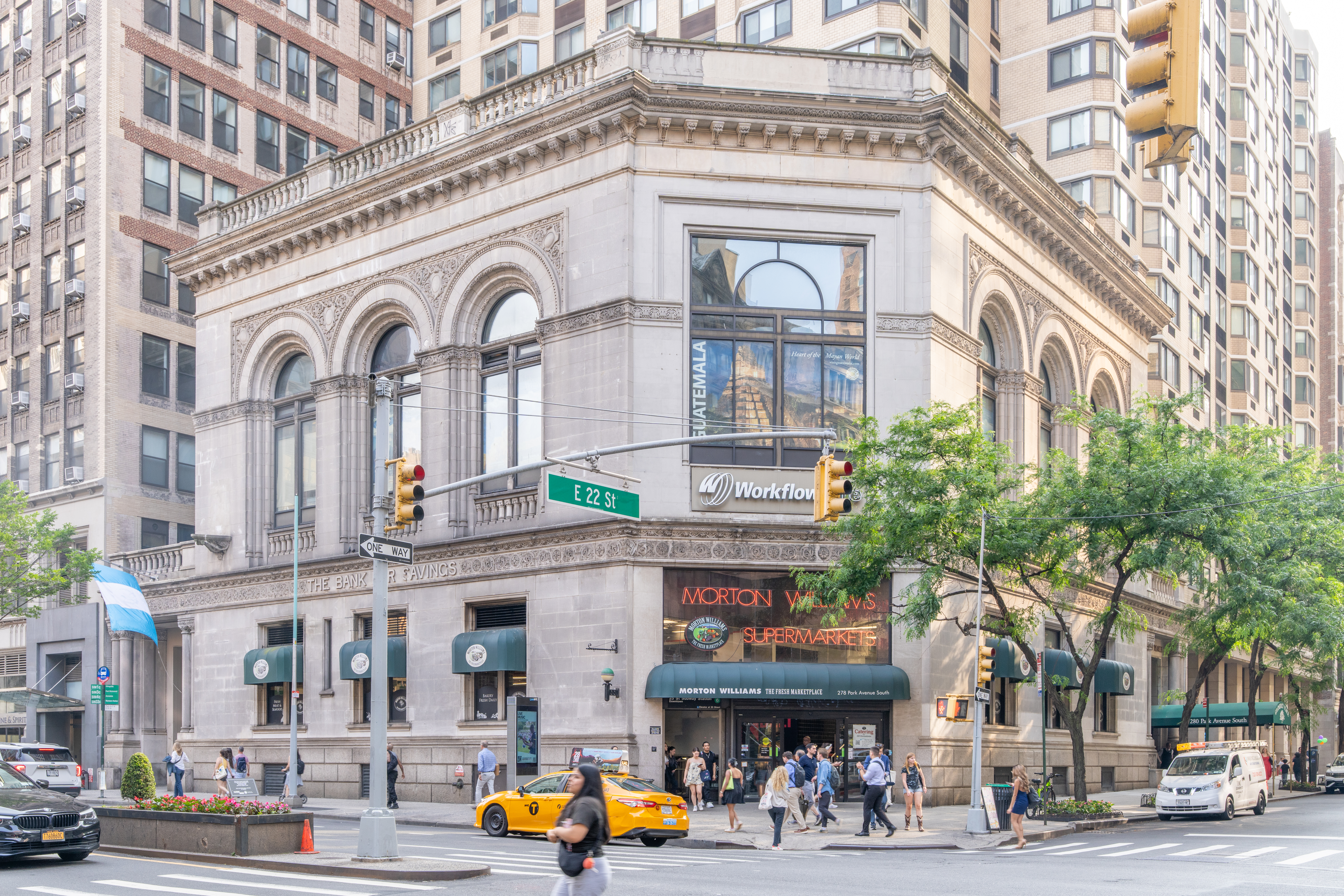
- Morton Williams supermarket in the former Bank for Savings building in Gramercy
- Company type: Private
- Industry: Grocery
- Founded: 1952 in the Bronx, New York
- Founders: The Kavner family
- Headquarters: The Bronx, New York
- Number of locations: 17
- Area served: New York metropolitan area
- Products: Bakery, dairy, delicatessen, frozen foods, grocery, meat, produce, seafood, snacks, prepared foods
- Services: Catering
- Owners: Wakefern Food Corporation
- Number of employees: 1,000+
- Website: mortonwilliams.com

Morton Williams Supermarkets is an American upscale supermarket chain operating seventeen stores in the New York City metropolitan area. It features ShopRite products as its private-label brand, supplied by ShopRite's parent company, Wakefern Food Corporation.

== History ==
The first location opened in the Bronx in 1952 and originally operated under the independent Associated Supermarkets brand.

In October 2025, it was reported that Wakefern Food Corp. had completed its acquisition of the company.

== Locations ==
Morton Williams operates 15 supermarkets in Manhattan, as well as one in the Bronx and one in Jersey City.

There are also three liquor stores in Manhattan operating under the name Morton Williams Wine & Spirits. These stores are independently owned and operated separate from the chain of supermarkets.
