= Price Rite =

American supermarket chain

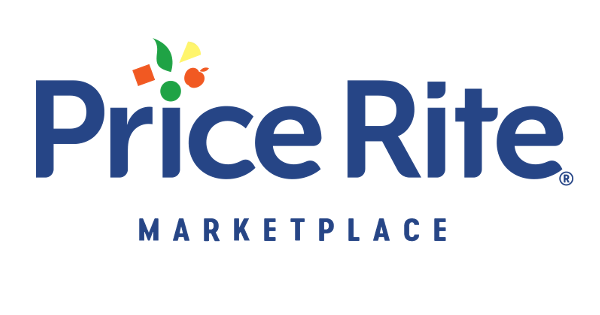
- Type: Subsidiary
- Industry: Supermarkets
- Founded: 1995; 31 years ago in West Springfield, Massachusetts
- Headquarters: Keasbey, New Jersey, U.S.
- Number of locations: 53 (2026)
- Area served: Connecticut, Massachusetts, Delaware, New Jersey, New York, New Hampshire, Pennsylvania, Rhode Island
- Key people: Kevin McDonnell president
- Number of employees: 4,000+ (2018)
- Parent: Wakefern Food Corporation
- Website: www.priceritemarketplace.com

Price Rite is a chain of supermarkets found in Connecticut, Massachusetts, New Hampshire, New Jersey, New York, Pennsylvania, and Rhode Island. Based in Keasbey, New Jersey, Price Rite is owned by New Jersey–based Wakefern Food Corporation, the cooperative behind ShopRite Supermarkets, Dearborn Market, and The Fresh Grocer. Prior to 2014, Wakefern owned and operated all Price Rite stores.

As of 2025, there are 53 Price Rite stores currently operating; Wakefern itself corporately-owns and operates 46 stores outside of New Jersey, while 5 stores in Massachusetts and the 2 stores in New Jersey are owned and operated by individual Wakefern members.

== Overview ==
Similar to other limited-assortment chains, including Aldi and Save-A-Lot, Price Rite offers drastically fewer stock-keeping units (SKUs) than its sibling ShopRite stores, which are conventional supermarkets. Price Rite stores operate on the same principles as their competition; however, they are a bit bigger (averaging 35,000 sq ft (3,300 m^{2})) and concentrate on offering a larger “fresh-food” selection.

Price Rite also emphasizes the fact that its stores are American-owned, by incorporating the phrase "An American Company" into its trademark. This is presumably to highlight the fact that much of Price Rite's competition is owned by European Union–based entities (Aldi and Lidl are both German-owned).

Due to the generic nature of the name "Price Rite", and the unfamiliarity with the brand outside the Northeast, Wakefern has also begun distributing Price Rite-branded merchandise, such as health-and-beauty, paper products, foodstuffs, and dairy products to other retail outlets, such as dollar stores, mom-and-pop pharmacies, and corner stores, along with other supermarkets, such as Gristedes Operating Corp., which owns Gristedes Supermarkets in New York City. Due to Gristedes' partnership with Amazon, selected Price Rite-branded products also are available for sale on that website. Price Rite products are also the store brand for discount stores such as National Wholesale Liquidators.

For most of the chain's existence, the Wakefern cooperative has been very careful not to cannibalize sales of its member-owned ShopRite stores by opening Price Rite stores in overlapping trade areas. As a result, most Price Rite stores were opened in New England or Pennsylvania, outside ShopRite's core regions. In 2013, the cooperative announced that it would allow its members to operate their own Price Rite stores. Since then, new Price Rite stores have opened within a few miles of ShopRite supermarkets in places such as: Camden and Garfield, New Jersey.

== History ==
=== Price Rite mini-clubs ===
During the 1980s and early 1990s, many American supermarket chains experimented with opening their own warehouse clubs to compete with Sam's Club, BJ's Wholesale Club and Price Club. As those chains were opening locations in the New York and Philadelphia metropolitan areas which are the main footprint of ShopRite, Wakefern decided to follow suit with the Price Rite nameplate. Wakefern defined Price Rite as a "mini-club", and at under 50,000 sq ft (4,600 m^{2}), promoted it as a convenient alternative to the massive conventional clubs.

Price Rite Mini-Clubs were opened in buildings that had previously housed ailing or outdated ShopRite stores and had been simply retrofitted with warehouse-type shelving. Thus, they lacked size, and did not have enough of a following to attract shoppers away from the true warehouse competition.

Wakefern members operated Price Rite mini-clubs in Fishkill, New York, and Rockaway, and Toms River, New Jersey. The last Price Rite club closed in 1994.

=== Price Rite stores ===
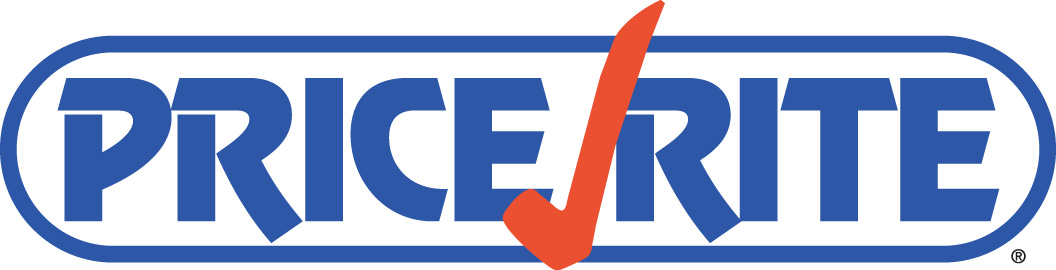
Former Price Rite logo, used from 1995 to 2017

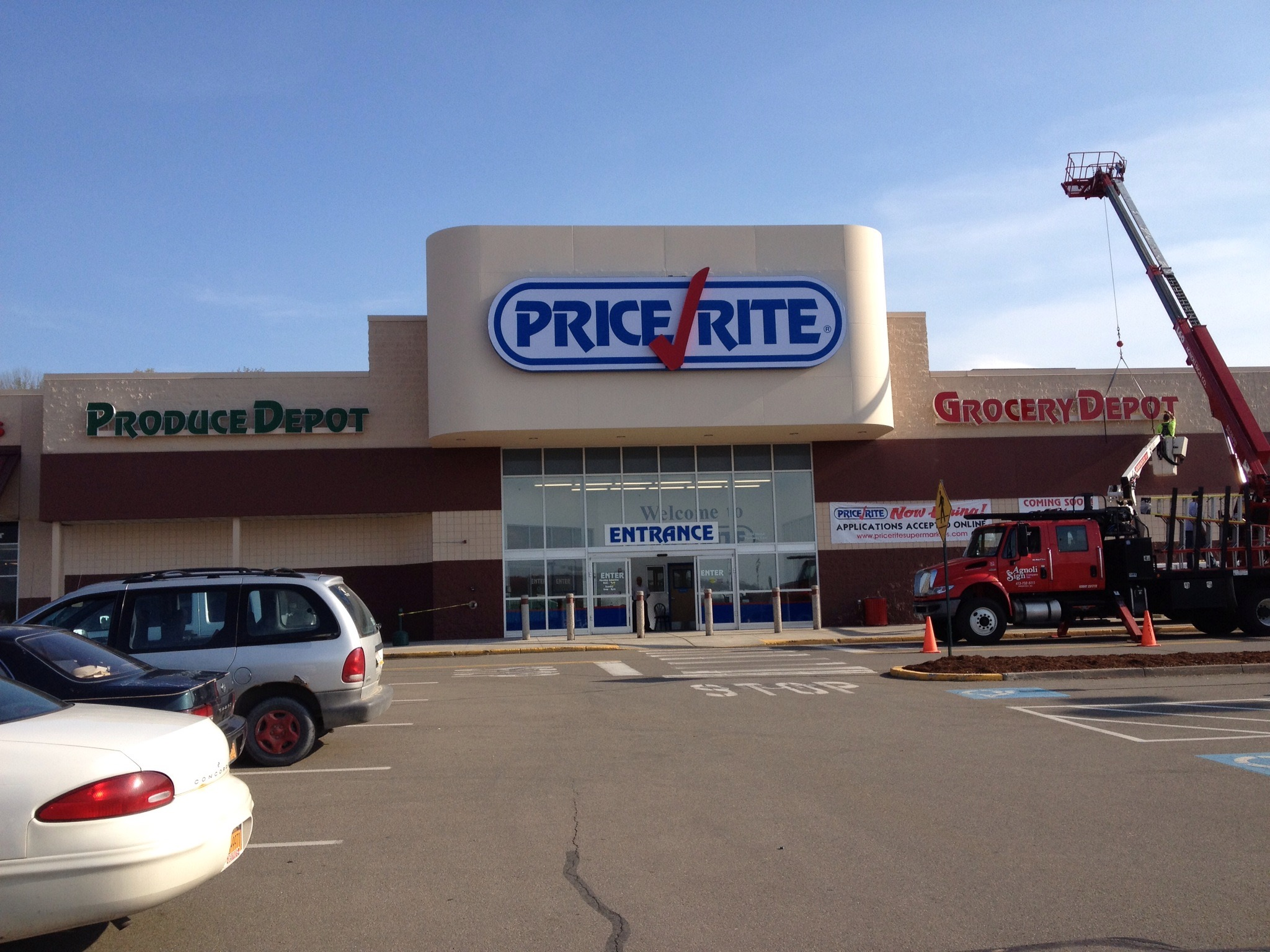
Price Rite Store being set up in Vestal, New York in 2012, in a former Circuit City. The store closed in October 2019.

In 1995 Wakefern Food Corporation opened reused the Price Rite name for its first limited-assortment supermarket in West Springfield, Massachusetts, operating in the same segment as no-frills operators which were successfully spreading across North America, such as Aldi, Food Basics, and Save-a-Lot.

Price Rite stores which opened in the 1990s or early 2000s lack the service departments found in conventional modern supermarkets, such as Deli, Bakery, Meat, and Seafood. These service departments are replaced by pre-packaged offerings prepared at centralized facilities which reduces cost for the store. More recently opened stores have started to add certain service departments, depending on both space available and on regional requirements.

In the years since the first Price Rite opened, the concept has been tweaked to emphasize the size and freshness of the perishable departments in comparison to its competition. Newer stores, such as the Price Rite of Brockton, Massachusetts, (at over 40,000 sq ft (3,700 m^{2})), are also larger than most of the earlier stores. Wakefern has also used the concept as a replacement for under-performing ShopRite stores or in regions where the Price Rite concept was thought to be more successful. As a result, under-performing ShopRite supermarkets in places such as York, Pennsylvania, and Wethersfield, Connecticut, have been converted to very successful Price Rite stores. The Torrington, Connecticut, Price Rite was a former ShopRite store that had sat unused for almost 10 years before it was opened as Price Rite.

In 2005, a Price Rite store was opened in Azusa, California, in partnership with K.V.Mart Co., which is an independent supermarket operator in southern California. A second store followed in the Los Angeles suburb of Hawaiian Gardens. Both stores were closed in 2013 and the partnership between Wakefern and K.V.Mart Co. was ended.

In 2014, Wakefern announced that the Price Rite banner was to be made available to all of its cooperative members, so they can open and operate their own Price Rite outlets. The first of these stores, which is owned and operated by cooperative member Inserra Supermarkets Inc., opened on July 1, 2014, in Garfield, New Jersey.

=== Price Rite Marketplace ===
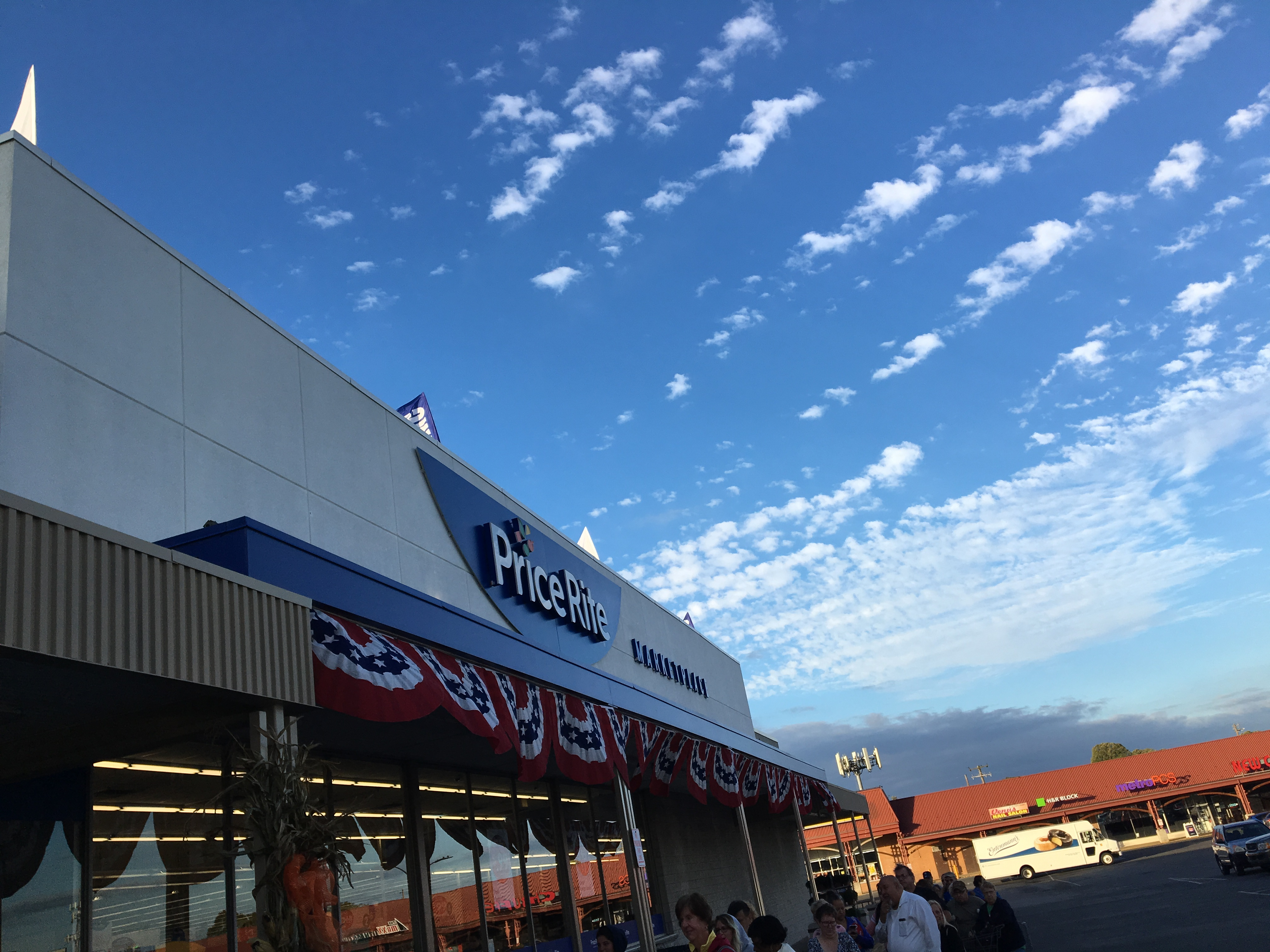
Price Rite Marketplace Store on the day of its re-opening in Allentown, Pennsylvania

Price Rite changed their logo and branding to "Price Rite Marketplace" in 2017. The company said that it wanted to reflect the changes that had been made in the stores since the original Price Rite limited-assortment format was launched in 1995. Accompanying the new logo and name change were updated graphics and signage. Price Rite is still a limited-assortment supermarket; however, the stores carry a larger number of SKUs (items) than many of its limited-assortment discount competition (Aldi, Lidl, Save-A-Lot.)

As Aldi and Lidl both announced aggressive expansions into the Northeast, Price Rite spent 2018 and 2019 remodeling most of its store base to the Price Rite Marketplace format. In 2019, as competition heated up, Price Rite quietly shuttered underperforming stores in Woodbridge, Virginia; Vestal, New York and a longtime store in Brockton, Massachusetts. As well as store near Hyattsville, Maryland

== Price Rite Bermuda ==
In 2007, a Price Rite store was opened in Pembroke, Bermuda, marking the first Price Rite store outside of the U.S. The store is owned and operated by The Marketplace Group Ltd. of Bermuda, which owns eight other Marketplace Supermarkets and has been a wholesale customer of Wakefern for years, even selling ShopRite-branded products in its Marketplace stores in Bermuda. On January 20, 2016, the company opened a second, larger Price Rite store in the Bermuda parish of Warwick. The Bermuda stores operate under a franchise agreement with Wakefern, and The Marketplace Group Ltd. is not a Wakefern member. While these stores use the Price Rite logo, the merchandise mix differs significantly from the U.S. stores. The Bermuda stores are more similar to warehouse clubs, selling mostly bulk-sized and club-sized products, as well as toys, electronics and softlines. The stores sell Price Rite-branded merchandise, but also feature Costco Wholesale's Kirkland Signature brand as well as national brands. The Bermuda stores operate their own website, separately from the U.S. stores.
