= Nanuet Town Centre =

Shopping mall in New York, U.S.

Coordinates: 41.095557°N 74.016009°W

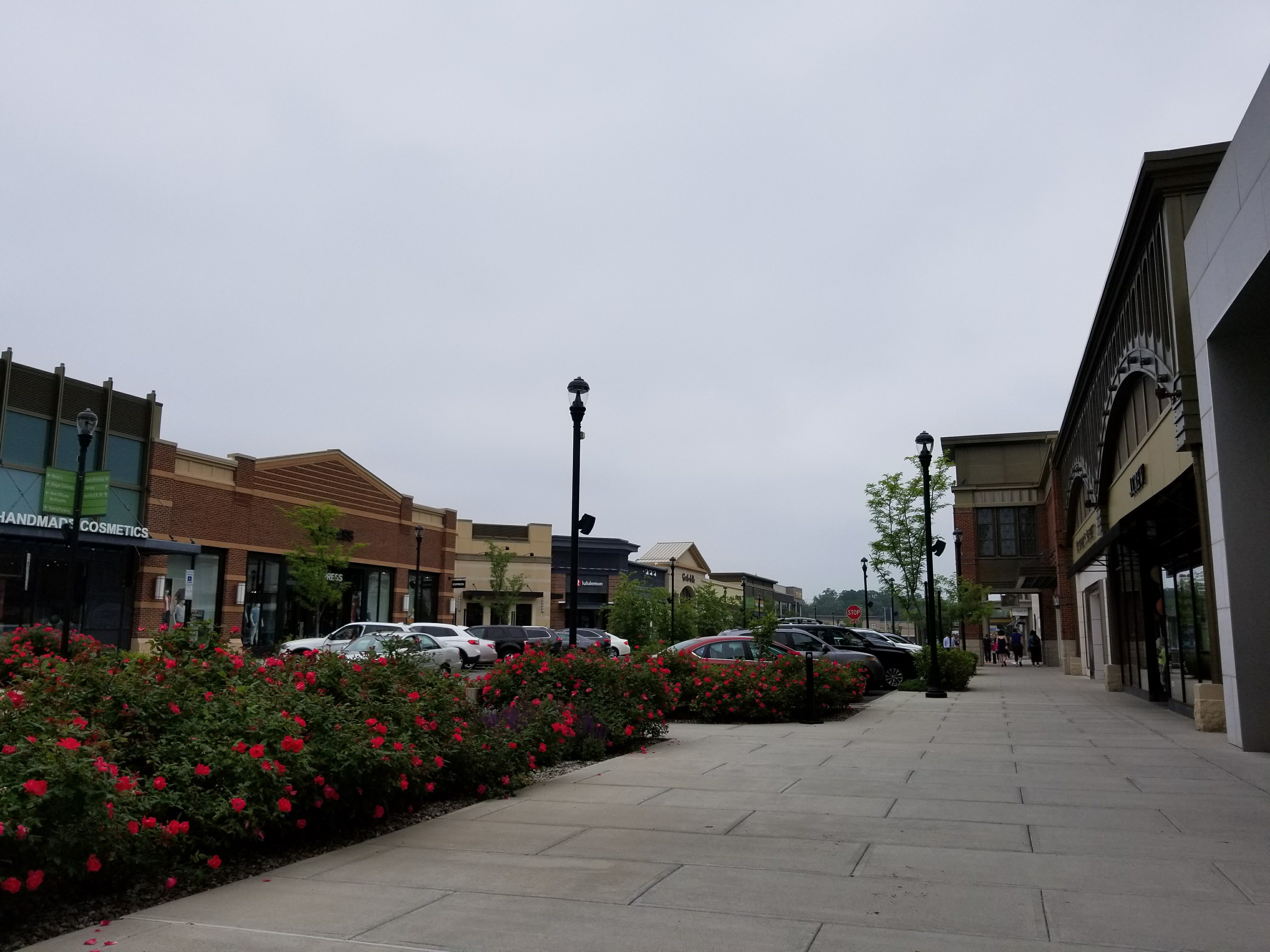
- Fashion Drive at Nanuet Town Centre (2017)
- Location: 5101 Fashion Drive; Nanuet, New York 10954
- Opened: 1969; 57 years ago (Nanuet Mall); 2013; 13 years ago (Shops at Nanuet)
- Owner: Alexander Property Holdings
- Num. of stores: 56
- Num. of anchor tenants: 2
- Floor area: 757,928 sq ft (70,413.8 m^{2})
- Floors: 1, with a cinema located on a second floor
- Public transit: Rockland Coaches: 11A, 20; Transport of Rockland: 59, 93; Access to New Jersey Transit/Metro-North Railroad train station in Nanuet (Pascack Valley Line).
- Website: nanuettowncentre.com

Nanuet Town Centre (formerly The Shops at Nanuet) is a lifestyle center located in Nanuet, New York. It is located at the intersection of New York State Route 59 and Middletown Road and is also accessible via exit 14 of the New York State Thruway. Built on the site of the former Nanuet Mall, the Shops at Nanuet debuted in 2013. As of 2025, the mall maintains traditional tenants Stop & Shop, as well as a Regal Nanuet & RPX.

== History ==
The original mall was built by Homart Development Company. It opened on November 4, 1969 with the two original anchor stores which were Bamberger's (later became Macy's) and Sears. In 1994, a new wing was built anchored by Abraham & Straus, which became Stern's in 1995. When the Stern's brand was phased out in 2001, (with most other stores becoming Macy's stores) the anchor space became Boscov's in 2002, before the latter closed in May 2008 in preparation for the mall's demolition (Simon Property Group owned the Boscov's space while Macy's and Sears owned their respective real estate).

The mall, which used to be wetlands, had grown to 900,000 square feet (84,000 m^{2}) and encompassed 120 stores in 1999. The mall went into decline following the opening of the nearby Palisades Center in March 1998. Nearly all of the stores except for Macy's and Sears vacated by early 2011, when Simon unveiled plans to rebuild the mall as The Shops at Nanuet, an outdoor mall featuring shops, restaurants, a fitness center, and a Regal Cinemas movie theater, which opened on November 7, 2013. By January 2012, demolition had begun. Construction started after the demolition and the new Shops at Nanuet opened on October 10, 2013.

=== Sears ===
On October 15, 2018, it was announced that Sears would be closing as part of a plan to close 142 stores nationwide. The store closed in January 2019. Representatives from the shopping center's owner, Simon Property Group, have discussed reconstructing the store, according to Clarkstown Town Supervisor George Hoehmann. Hoehmann said he held several discussions about the Sears space with Simon representatives since June and anticipated getting more details in the next few months. Although no formal plans have been filed, Simon officials want to bring up to three undisclosed national retailers into the space formerly occupied by the defunct department store.

=== 2018 and 2019 ===
On November 29, 2018, it was announced that At Home furniture store would join the complex on the first floor, with additional mall space to be announced) coming on the second floor, to replace Macy's. At Home opened in February 2021.

On September 23, 2019, Fairway Market announced that they would be closing their Shops At Nanuet location. The store closed on September 25, 2019.

=== 2020s ===
On November 18, 2020, Stop & Shop announced they would relocate from their current Nanuet location on South Middletown Road to the former Fairway Market Space. The location opened on August 6, 2021.

The former Sears store became a Depo House furniture store in 2022. Buffalo Wild Wings replaced the former Zinburger location and opened on September 8, 2022. Also, a new Mexican restaurant known as Sombrero Tacoria replaced the former Qdoba in late 2022. A new coffee shop known as Roast'd replaced Starbucks.

The Regal Cinemas location was supposed to close in January 2023 due to the company’s financial struggles, but thanks to an online petition signed by local residents, the theater remains open.

In January 2025, Simon sold off the mall property to Alexander Property Holdings LLC in New City, New York.

On August 29, 2025, it was announced that the At Home location would be added to the list of closures as part of the company's Chapter 11 bankruptcy, which was filed in June, 2025. The store closed in October.

In November, 2025, Popeyes opened up as a "pad site" across from the Stop and Shop.

The new mall owners plan to redevelop the former Sears site including the former automotive center into luxury housing and bring additional "pad sites" for retail and dining with an unannounced date of start.

== Incidents ==
Nanuet Mall was the site of the 1981 Brink's robbery, during which members of the Black Liberation Army and the May 19th Communist Movement murdered two police officers and a security guard during the robbery of an armored car.
