= The Fresh Grocer =

American supermarket chain

- Type: Subsidiary
- Industry: Grocery
- Founded: 1996 (30 years ago) in Philadelphia, Pennsylvania
- Founder: Patrick J. Burns
- Headquarters: Drexel Hill, Pennsylvania, U.S.
- Number of locations: 24 (2024)
- Area served: New Jersey, New York, Pennsylvania
- Key people: Patrick J. Burns (president and CEO)
- Number of employees: 1,500
- Parent: Wakefern Food Corporation
- Website: thefreshgrocer.com

The Fresh Grocer is a supermarket chain based in Drexel Hill, Pennsylvania that operates twenty-four stores in the greater Philadelphia and the greater Scranton areas of Pennsylvania, as well as one store in the greater Pittsburgh area, and northern New Jersey and Long Island, New York. Founded in 1996 in Philadelphia, Pennsylvania, as an independent company, the company became a member of the Wakefern Food Corporation, a retailers' cooperative, in 2013.

== History ==
The Fresh Grocer opened in 1996 in Philadelphia, Pennsylvania. The Fresh Grocer has locations on Chestnut Street and Broad Street in North Philadelphia. On August 1, 2013, The Fresh Grocer became a member of Wakefern. One of the stores was converted to the ShopRite name while the others retained the Fresh Grocer name. The Fresh Grocer location in Wilmington, Delaware closed on December 9, 2019.

== Expansion ==
The chain opened four new Fresh Grocer stores in March 2016, all in former Pathmark stores that were purchased at auction. The stores are in Wyncote, Upper Darby, Brookhaven, and Monument Avenue in Philadelphia.

Since 2001, the University of Pennsylvania made efforts to remove The Fresh Grocer from its Walnut Street location. In 2017, The Fresh Grocer was asked to vacate the property after failing to renew its lease. The grocery store sued University of Pennsylvania maintaining its intention to stay at the location. The property is currently an Acme Markets grocery store.

In 2018, Governor of Pennsylvania, Tom Wolf spoke at The Fresh Grocer regarding boost pay in Pennsylvania allowing "hundreds of thousands of additional salaried employees eligible for overtime pay".

In 2019, Nicholas Markets, which previously operated as part of the Foodtown chain, joined the Wakefern cooperative, switching their stores to the Fresh Grocer banner, bringing the total stores under the banner to 13. In 2022, Gerrity's Supermarkets announced that they would be transitioning their 10 stores from the ShurSave banner to The Fresh Grocer banner, bringing the total stores under the banner to 23. Gerrity's Supermarkets completed this transition in late 2022.

In 2024, The Fresh Grocer announced its entrance into New York through the opening of a new location in Oakdale at the Lighthouse Commons shopping center on Montauk Highway, formerly home to a Best Market. The store, owned and operated by the Thompson family, spans 26,000 square feet.

In 2026, The Fresh Grocer expanded into New York City through the opening of a location at 523 Fulton Street in Downtown Brooklyn. The store spans approximately 20,000 square feet.
