= Dart Man =

American criminal

Dart Man was the name given by the media to the person suspected of 53 dart attacks on women during the summer of 1990 in New York City.

== Attacks ==
The first reported incident occurred on June 28, and by July 7, 1990, more than 50 women had been struck by a dart, usually in the buttocks. The victims of attacks by Dart Man all fit a similar profile: light-skinned women attired in business suits or skirts. Witnesses described the attacker as a Black man.

== Apprehension ==
In late July, the New York City Police Department apprehended Jerome Wright, a 33-year-old Bronx resident who worked as a messenger for an advertising agency. Wright was identified as Dart Man by three witnesses in a police lineup. During Wright's arraignment, it was revealed that he had a prior criminal conviction in 1988 for selling cocaine and in 1989 for petty larceny.

On August 8, 1990, Wright was granted bail at $1,000, and all the charges against him were reduced to misdemeanors.

== See also ==
- Westchester Dartman
