= Gourmet Garage =

Chain of natural food market in USA

Gourmet Garage is a chain of specialty/natural food markets with four locations in Manhattan as of 2022. The company began as Flying Foods, a specialty food distributor, and transitioned into retail in 1992. Gourmet Garage's 3 locations were purchased by Village Super Markets, a member of the Wakefern Food Corporation cooperative, in 2019.

== History ==
Flying Foods was founded in 1981. By 1987, when the business was sold to Kraft Foods, it had grown from one office to four and both imported foreign products and exported American artisan-made food overseas.

In 1992, the store formally opened on Wooster Street in Soho. Arons partnered with Adam Hartman, a CPA who had helped negotiate the sale of Flying Foods, and two food business veterans, John Gottfried and Edwin Visser, to open the retailer, which prided itself on the stark contrast to specialty stores of that period. Gottfried told the New York Daily Press, "The previous approach was to sell this stuff like jewelry. We sell it like produce."

In 1994, the business moved to a larger space at the corner of Broome and Mercer in Soho. The following year they opened a new location in a former garage space on the East 64th St., still selling their high quality products at a slightly lower price. Gourmet Garage continued to pursue that audience throughout Manhattan, opening stores on the Upper East Side, in Greenwich Village, and near Lincoln Center. A new store in Tribeca opened in mid September 2015.

== See also ==
- List of supermarkets
