= Joseph Waldbaum =

American businessperson

Joseph Waldbaum was an American businessman, the founder of the Waldbaum supermarket chain.

== Family roots ==
Waldbaum was a Jewish immigrant to the United States born in a village (shtetl) called Cholojow in what was then Austria. Cholojow was a small town in the county of Radziechow at the edge of Galicia, in Austria. Cholojow has changed its nationality several times since, being part of Poland, Germany and now Ukraine. It can be found in the western part of the country.

Waldbaum was the eldest of four brothers: Joseph Waldbaum, Sam (Shaul) Waldbaum, Aby Waldbaum and Beryl (Barnett) Waldbaum.

== Emigration from Eastern Europe ==
During the anti-Semitic pogroms of the late 19th century, Waldbaum, his brothers, and Beryl Waldbaum's new family Geitel and Chaye (later to be known as Jane Waldbaum) left for England and the United States. It is believed that this happened in 1898 when Jane was 10 years of age.

They arrived in Hull in England. Beryl Waldbaum and his family traveled to Manchester, settling in the Strangeways area. Joseph Waldbaum went straight to the USA with his brother Shaul (Sam).

== Waldbaum's ==
In 1904, Joseph Waldbaum started a shop in Brooklyn. From this one store he expanded and created the Waldbaum's Supermarket Chain, which reached its zenith of 160 stores before being bought by The Great Atlantic and Pacific Tea Company in 1986.
