= Julia Waldbaum =

American businesswoman and philanthropist

Julia Waldbaum (July 4, 1897 – September 30, 1996) was an American businesswoman and philanthropist, a co-owner of Waldbaum's supermarket chain and the company's secretary.

== Biography ==
Julia Leffel was born in Manhattan and raised in Bedford–Stuyvesant, Brooklyn. She was the third of six children. Her parents were Anna and Harry Leffel. She married Israel (aka Izzy) Waldbaum when she was 21, and he was 28. He owned a grocery store, and she worked there, they brought up three children together. In 1947, at age 55, her husband had died. At the time, the family-owned a chain of seven stores. In 1986, A&P bought the chain from the family. At that year, the chain consisted of 140 stores and had a revenue of $1.37 billion. In the 1960s, the chain expanded significantly and sold 400 products under the Waldbaum's label; almost all of them carried her picture along with her recipes, which she created at her home.

She used to make 30 surprise inspections in the stores each month, even after the acquisition in 1986, taking care of quality, service, and cleanliness. She was the benefactress at charity fund-raising dinners, along with donations to opera and foster homes. Waldbaum died in her sleep at her home in Queens, New York City, at the age of 99. She was survived by a son, a daughter, ten grandchildren, and twenty-four great-grandchildren.
