= Rockland County Times =

- Type: weekly newspaper
- Language: English
- OCLC number: 9889767
- Website: https://www.rocklandtimes.com/

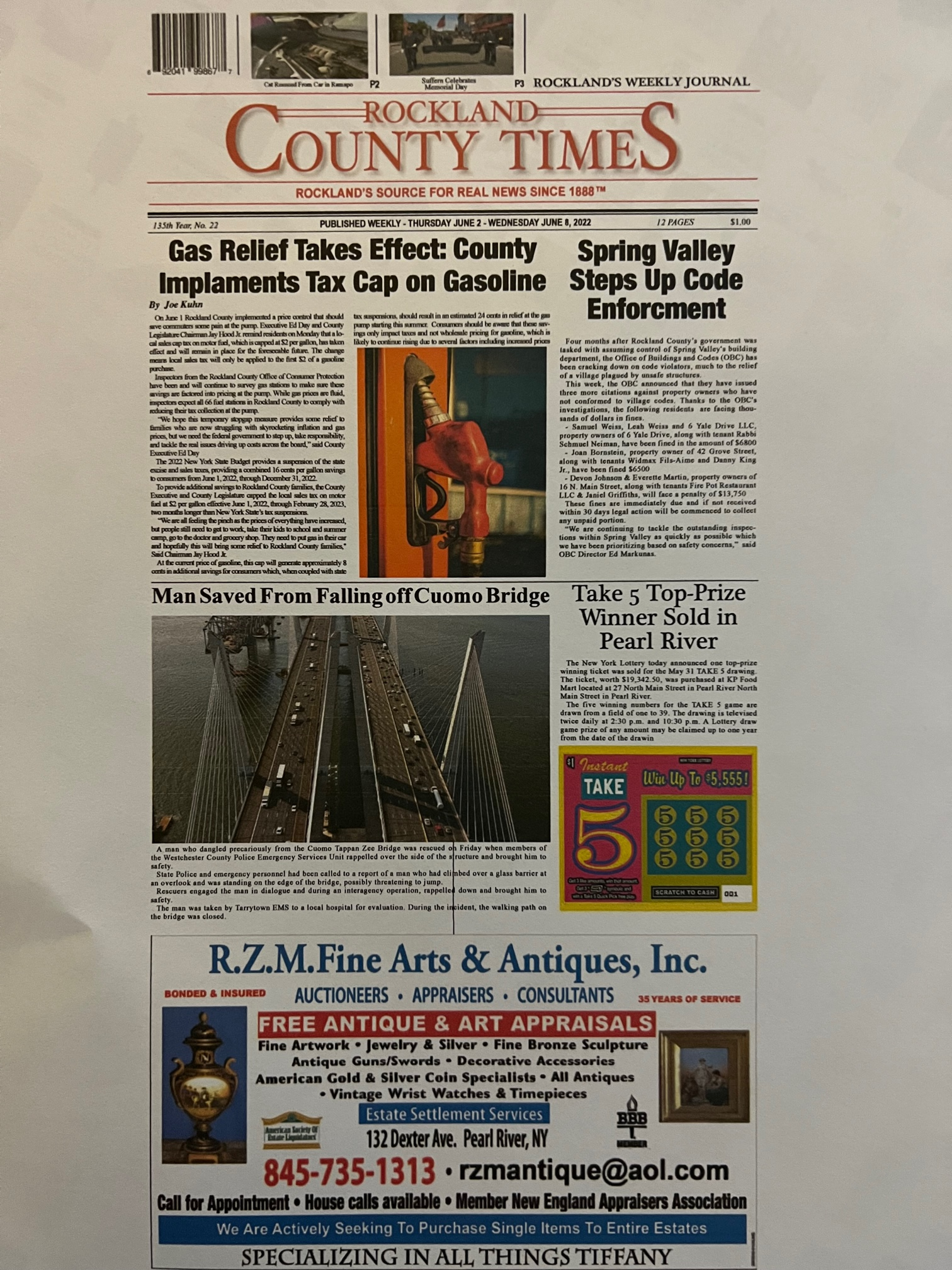
A recent front page from The Rockland County Times was seen on more than 100 newsstands and locations throughout Rockland County.

The Rockland County Times is a weekly newspaper published in Rockland County, New York, and has been in publication since October 1889. The broadsheet-paid newspaper is published weekly on Thursdays. Along with its mail subscriptions, it is distributed at 115 locations throughout the county. The paper is published from its offices at 119 Main Street, in Nanuet, New York. As of 2024, it is the only county-wide paid weekly newspaper in Rockland County.

Robert J. Connor was a former columnist for the Rockland County Times. Since 2013, the paper's reporting has been sourced by People, CBS News, and Politico, among others.

== History of ownership ==
In 1998, the paper declared bankruptcy and was purchased by Peter Sluys, a former editor of other weekly newspapers, and Armand Miele, the paper's publisher. The following year, the Rockland County Times was designated one of the official newspapers of Rockland County, for purposes of publication of legal notices and announcements.

In 2014, the paper was purchased by Dylan Skriloff, its editor. Six years later, in 2020, it was purchased by John and Walter Sanchez, owners of The Queens Ledger / Greenpoint Star Weekly Newspaper Group in New York City, and The Wave of Rockaway.
