= Best Market =

American supermarket chain

- Type: Private
- Industry: Retail (Grocery)
- Founded: 1994
- Founder: Ben Raitses
- Defunct: 2021
- Fate: acquired by Lidl with all stores Renovated and converted in 2021
- Headquarters: Bethpage, New York
- Number of locations: 30
- Key people: President & CEO: Rebecca Philbert
- Owners: Aviv and Eran Raitses
- Number of employees: N/A
- Website: bestmarket.com

Best Market was a family-owned, regional supermarket chain with 30 stores in New York, Connecticut, and New Jersey. The company was headquartered in Bethpage, New York, and had been owned by the Raitses family since the company's first store opened in Lake Ronkonkoma, New York, in 1994.

Best Market focused on fresh foods, especially produce, meat, seafood, deli and bakery, but also sold traditional grocery store items. Its stores typically have smaller overall footprints than competitors, and its offerings also include in-house traditional barbecue, a juice bar, sushi department and large selections of craft beer in many stores.

== History ==
=== Early Years, Produce Warehouse ===
Best Market was a private, family-owned company. The business, which was founded as a small fruit and vegetable stand by Ben Raitses. The stand expanded into a storefront produce store and, later, into the first Produce Warehouse in 1994.

Continuing its growth, the company opened up several more Produce Warehouse stores, focusing exclusively on New York and expanding from the outer boroughs of New York City into the suburbs of Long Island.

=== Best Yet Market ===
The company's name was changed to Best Yet Market in 2002. In 2005, Best Yet Market had attempted a grocery delivery service in Manhattan that was ultimately unsuccessful. At the time, it competed with FreshDirect and Whole Foods Market, though Best Yet Market limited its offerings to the Upper East Side. Though the delivery service was short-lived, Best Yet would begin offering grocery delivery again in parts of Harlem beginning in 2010.

Best Yet had opened a new flagship store in Harlem, New York, in 2010, bringing the chain to Manhattan for the first time in the company's history and rectifying a shortage in fresh food offerings in the area, according to a New York City Department of City Planning survey. The Harlem store, which was funded in part with a million-dollar loan from the Upper Manhattan Development Zone, offers not only fresh produce, but also fresh meat and seafood departments, craft beer, and gourmet grocery products.

The 2011 opening of a store in East Patchogue, New York earned the chain praise from East Patchogue city officials for bringing a market featuring fresh produce to what had been designated a food desert by New York state officials.

=== Best Market ===
Best Yet Market began the process of changing the name of its stores from Best Yet Market to Best Market in 2012. The company's first store outside New York, in Holmdel, New Jersey, opened in early 2012 as Best Market. Notably, the Holmdel Best Market dedicated 25% of its floor space to produce, and in the immediate aftermath of Hurricane Sandy, the store, powered by an emergency generator, opened to customers and donated most of its undamaged food to local residents impacted by the storm.

=== Expansion ===
In 2013, the company expanded into a third state, opening a Best Market location in Newington, Connecticut. The Newington location offers traditional barbecue from an in-house smoker, expanding on a program first offered in its Harlem store. The Newington Best Market also includes an electric car charging station as part of an alliance with Connecticut Electric Car. The same year, the company's West Babylon location won the "Best Retro Design" award from Progressive Grocer in that magazine's annual Store Design Contest.

Beginning in 2015, Best Market began purchasing former A&P locations in New York, including multiple Waldbaum's and Pathmark stores, as well as one former Food Emporium in Tribeca. These locations were all opened under its new Best Market banner, increasing the total number of the company's stores from 19 to 26. The company then opened four more stores in 2016, bringing its total number of stores to 30 and the Best Yet Market name was fully phased out by the end of that year.

In August 2016, Best Market and New York Governor Andrew Cuomo announced it would move its headquarters from Bethpage to Bay Shore, Long Island, taking over a former Entenmann's factory that closed in 2014. The new headquarters would function as the cornerstone of a proposed regional food hub and incorporate food production facilities, distribution for the chain's stores, and a food incubator to support emerging food entrepreneurs. The move was funded in part by the Empire State Development Corporation, which offered a $1 million tax credit in exchange for a promise to create 125 new jobs at the facility and invest approximately $6 million in renovating the building.

=== Buy Out & acquisition ===
Lidl, a German based grocery chain, has bought out and acquired all of the Best Markets stores statewide except the Newington location. The Newington location was still owned by the Best Market ownership and renamed Local Market. On September 21, 2020, Local Market went out of business.

== Locations ==
According to its website, Best Market has operated 30 locations in New York, and New Jersey.

== Sustainability ==
Best Market has instituted multiple green initiatives at its stores and Bethpage headquarters. It operates an all-hybrid vehicle fleet, including several electric vehicles, and offers car charging stations at some stores. Several store locations are partially powered by solar energy, including its Massapequa store, which relies almost exclusively on solar panels installed on the store's rooftop for its electricity.
