= Nanuet, New York =

Hamlet in New York, United States

- Census-designated place
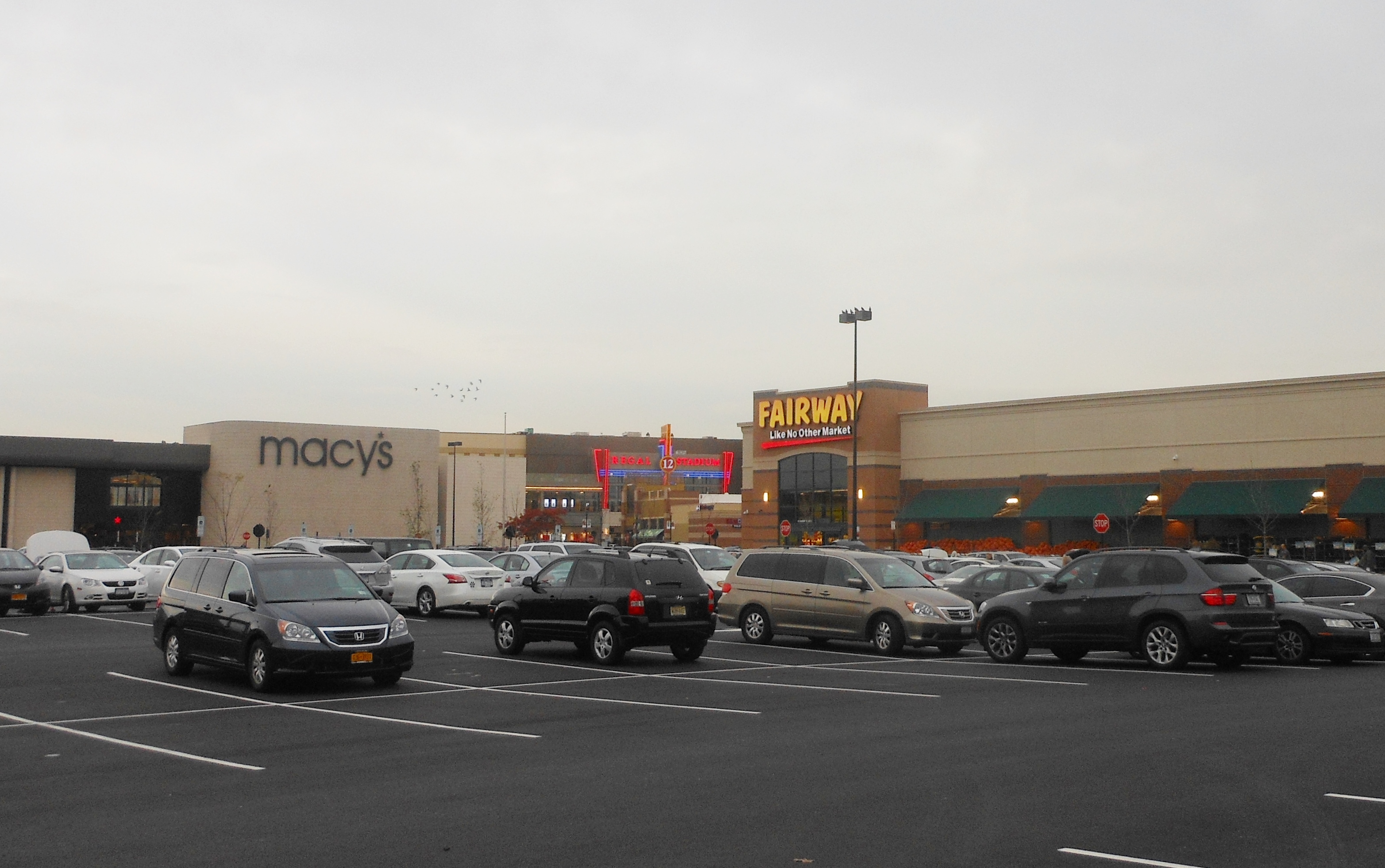
- The Shops at Nanuet shopping mall

- Location in Rockland County and the state of New York.

- Location within the state of New York
- Coordinates: 41°5′43″N 74°0′56″W
- Country: United States
- State: New York
- County: Rockland
- Town: Clarkstown

Area
  - Total: 5.44 sq mi (14.09 km^{2})
  - Land: 5.44 sq mi (14.08 km^{2})
  - Water: 0.0039 sq mi (0.01 km^{2})
- Elevation: 299 ft (91 m)

Population (2020)
  - Total: 18,886
  - Density: 3,475/sq mi (1,341.7/km^{2})
- Time zone: UTC-5 (Eastern (EST))
  - Summer (DST): UTC-4 (EDT)
- ZIP code: 10954
- Area code: 845
- FIPS code: 36-49407
- GNIS feature ID: 0958250

Nanuet (English pronunciation: /ˈnænjuɛːt/) is a hamlet and census-designated place in the town of Clarkstown, New York, United States. The third largest hamlet in Clarkstown, it is located north of Pearl River, south of New City, east of Spring Valley, and west of West Nyack. It is located midway between Manhattan and Bear Mountain, 19 miles (31 km) north and south of each respectively; and 2 miles (3 km) north of the New Jersey border. It has one of three Rockland County stations on New Jersey Transit's Pascack Valley Line. As of the 2020 census, Nanuet had a population of 18,886.

The opening of the New York State Thruway (Interstate 87/287), the Tappan Zee Bridge, and the Palisades Interstate Parkway in the mid-1950s helped usher in decades of population growth and real estate development, including the construction of the Nanuet Mall and local shopping centers.

== History ==
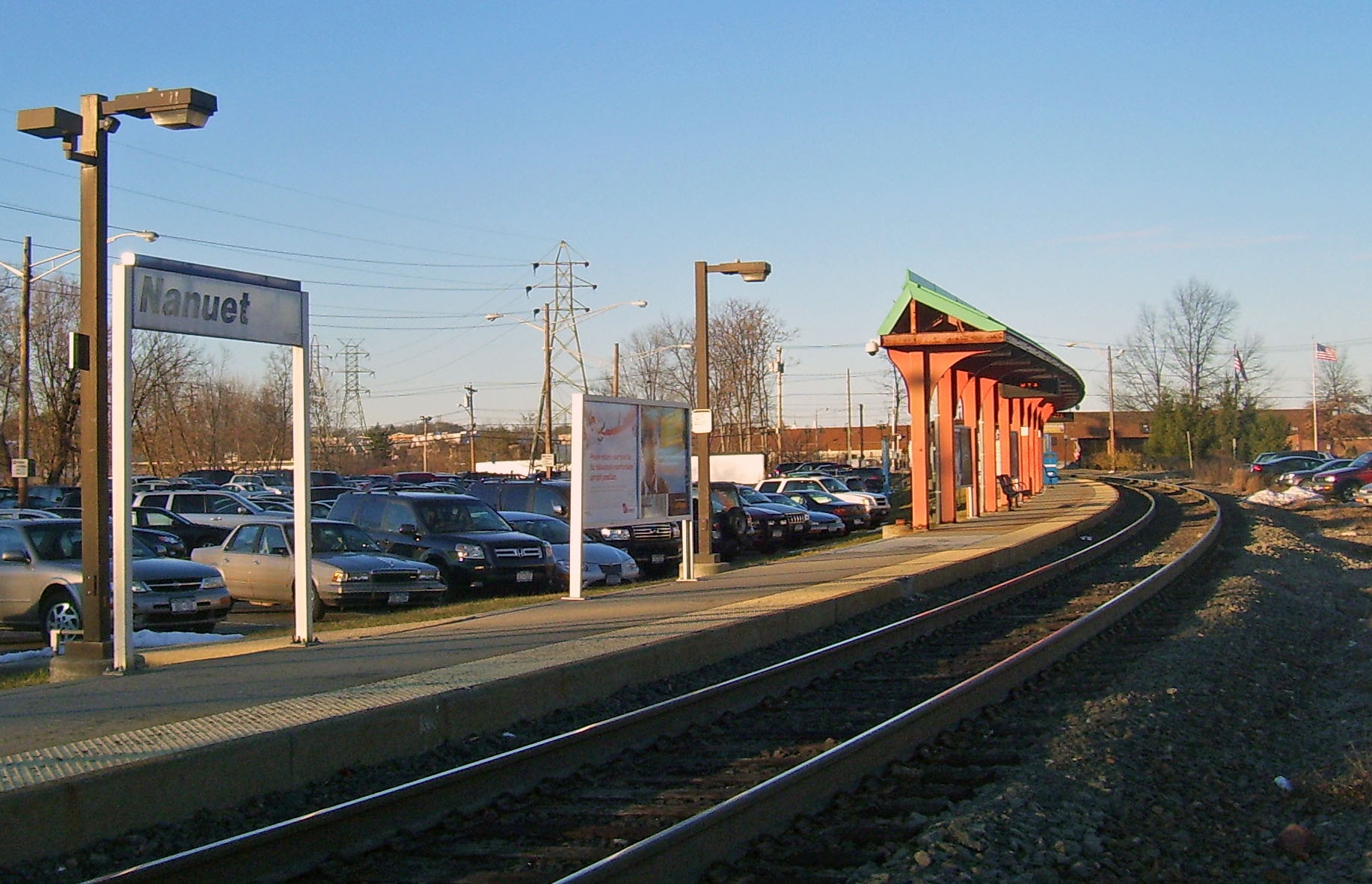
Nanuet Railroad Station

The first name of the place was Clarkstown, a name it retained until 1856 when, at the suggestion of James De Clark, the present name was given by Munsee Chief (Nannawitt). Chief Nannawitt sold lands in North Jersey, signed the Wawayanda Patent and witnessed the Cheesecock Patent.

The Erie Railroad arrived in Rockland County in 1841 along its original main line to Piermont. The New Jersey and New York Railroad, the predecessor of the Pascack Valley Line, reached Nanuet in 1869.

== Geography ==
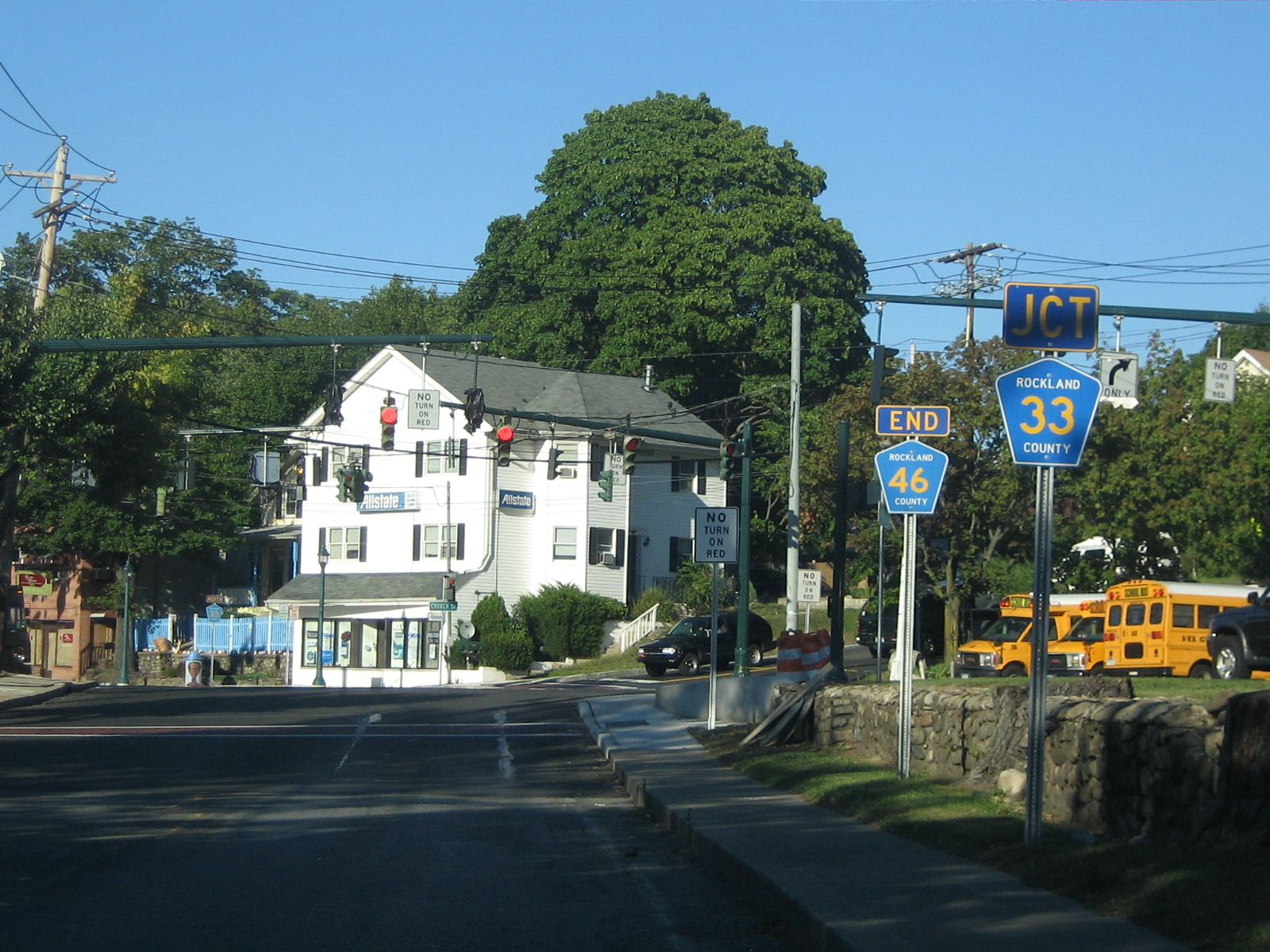
Downtown intersection

Nanuet is located at 41°5′43″N 74°0′56″W (41.095296, −74.015622).

According to the United States Census Bureau, the CDP has a total area of 5.4 square miles (14 km^{2}), all land.

The topography is a result of the massive glaciation of the last ice age, and as such the soil is extremely rocky and the surface shows glacial erratic boulders. The glacial ice scraped off and carried with it rocks and minerals from as far north as Canada, depositing them in Nanuet in particular and southern New York in general. This is the hypothesized source of the manganese-rich parvo-mangano-edenite minerals, as well as the placer ore for gold panning within Nauraushaun Brook. There are fossil impressions of huge Precambrian Era jellyfish in the wooded, undeveloped regions. One prominent surface feature, a Hopewell Indian burial mound dating to 325 AD, is located near Nauraushaun Brook at the western edge of the Manhattan Woods Golf Club in West Nyack. Aerial views of this feature reveal it to have been built in the shape of a snake.

Lake Nanuet Park is a pool which is designed to look like a naturally occurring lake. The park which surrounds it offers residents a summer pool and recreational baseball/softball fields. Recent massive flooding and subsequent contamination closed the park for swimming until 2011.

Climate data for Nanuet, NY
Month	Jan	Feb	Mar	Apr	May	Jun	Jul	Aug	Sep	Oct	Nov	Dec	Year
Mean daily maximum °F (°C)	38 (3)	42 (6)	51 (11)	62 (17)	72 (22)	81 (27)	85 (29)	83 (28)	76 (24)	65 (18)	54 (12)	43 (6)	63 (17)
Mean daily minimum °F (°C)	22 (−6)	24 (−4)	30 (−1)	39 (4)	49 (9)	58 (14)	63 (17)	62 (17)	55 (13)	44 (7)	36 (2)	27 (−3)	42 (6)
Average precipitation inches (mm)	3.81 (97)	3.33 (85)	4.50 (114)	4.54 (115)	4.43 (113)	4.36 (111)	4.66 (118)	4.47 (114)	4.81 (122)	4.57 (116)	4.24 (108)	4.38 (111)	52.1 (1,324)

== Demographics ==
Historical population
Census	Pop.	Note	%±
2000	16,708		—
2010	17,882		7.0%
2020	18,886		5.6%
U.S. Decennial Census

=== 2020 census ===
As of the 2020 census, Nanuet had a population of 18,886. The median age was 43.3 years. 20.5% of residents were under the age of 18 and 19.8% of residents were 65 years of age or older. For every 100 females there were 91.9 males, and for every 100 females age 18 and over there were 87.9 males age 18 and over.

100.0% of residents lived in urban areas, while 0.0% lived in rural areas.

There were 6,658 households in Nanuet, of which 29.8% had children under the age of 18 living in them. Of all households, 49.2% were married-couple households, 14.7% were households with a male householder and no spouse or partner present, and 31.5% were households with a female householder and no spouse or partner present. About 28.1% of all households were made up of individuals and 15.1% had someone living alone who was 65 years of age or older.

There were 6,976 housing units, of which 4.6% were vacant. The homeowner vacancy rate was 1.5% and the rental vacancy rate was 3.5%.

Racial composition as of the 2020 census
Race	Number	Percent
White	9,408	49.8%
Black or African American	2,759	14.6%
American Indian and Alaska Native	81	0.4%
Asian	2,509	13.3%
Native Hawaiian and Other Pacific Islander	4	0.0%
Some other race	2,454	13.0%
Two or more races	1,671	8.8%
Hispanic or Latino (of any race)	4,389	23.2%

=== 2000 census ===
As of the census of 2000, there were 16,708 people, 5,975 households, and 4,302 families residing in the CDP. The population density was 3,080.3 inhabitants per square mile (1,189.3/km^{2}). There were 6,134 housing units at an average density of 1,130.9 per square mile (436.6/km^{2}). The racial makeup of the CDP was 71.78% White, 13.34% African American, 0.23% Native American, 9.70% Asian, 0.08% Pacific Islander, 2.30% from other races, and 2.57% from two or more races. Hispanic or Latino of any race were 8.16% of the population.

There were 5,975 households, out of which 32.8% had children under the age of 18 living with them, 58.5% were married couples living together, 10.6% had a female householder with no husband present, and 28.0% were non-families. Of all households, 23.5% were made up of individuals, and 9.1% had someone living alone who was 65 years of age or older. The average household size was 2.71 and the average family size was 3.23.

In the CDP, the population was spread out, with 23.7% under the age of 18, 7.2% from 18 to 24, 31.1% from 25 to 44, 25.1% from 45 to 64, and 12.9% who were 65 years of age or older. The median age was 38 years. For every 100 females, there were 91.6 males. For every 100 females age 18 and over, there were 86.0 males.

The median income for a household in the CDP was $71,178, and the median income for a family was $81,205. Males had a median income of $50,713 versus $38,658 for females. The per capita income for the CDP was $30,338. About 3.6% of families and 5.2% of the population were below the poverty line, including 7.4% of those under age 18 and 4.5% of those age 65 or over.

== Education ==
Blue Ribbon

U.S. News & World Report reports that 100.0% of teachers at the Pearl Nanuet Union Free School District are licensed and the student-to-teacher ratio is lower than the state average, at 11:1. The district retains 2 full-time counselors on staff. The test score Proficiency range in the district for mathematics are within 46%–82% and reading 53%–96%. in 2018 the Nanuet Union Free School District earn first place in the Magna Award Program for the district's innovative program development and implementation. Several years ago, the district employed an English as a New Language (ENL) director and double the ENL staffing along with teaching assistants not required by the NY state to support their student success.

Nanuet's 4 public schools is served by the Nanuet Union Free School District.

- George W. Miller Elementary School
  - The GWM Elementary school public school serves children from Kindergarten through 2nd grade.
- Highview Elementary School
  - Highview teaches grades 3rd and 4th. Two-thirds of the school enrollment population are minority student. One-third of enrolled student are economically disadvantage. NICHE rank proficient level at 72% and 65% for mathematics and reading respectfully.
- A. MacArthur Barr Middle School
  - The middle school serves children from 5th to 8th grade. NICHE ranked proficient level at 46% and 53% for mathematics and reading respectfully.
- Nanuet Senior High School
  - In 2024, The total minority enrollment is 57%, and 29% of students are economically disadvantaged.
  - NICHE ranks proficient level at 87% and 95% for mathematics and reading respectfully.
  - The district pays all students in the 10th grade to take the PSAT's so all students have the opportunity to assess their future college plans regardless of their socioeconomic means.
  - In 1989 the boys football team won the New York State Division III championship.
  - In 2008–2009 girls' varsity basketball became state and federation champions.
  - 2016, Nanuet Senior High School was named a National Blue Ribbon winner by the United States Department of Education.
  - In 2024 USNews ranking of Nanuet Senior High School was 174 in the state of New York with an overall scorecard of 89.78%

== Landmarks and places of interest ==
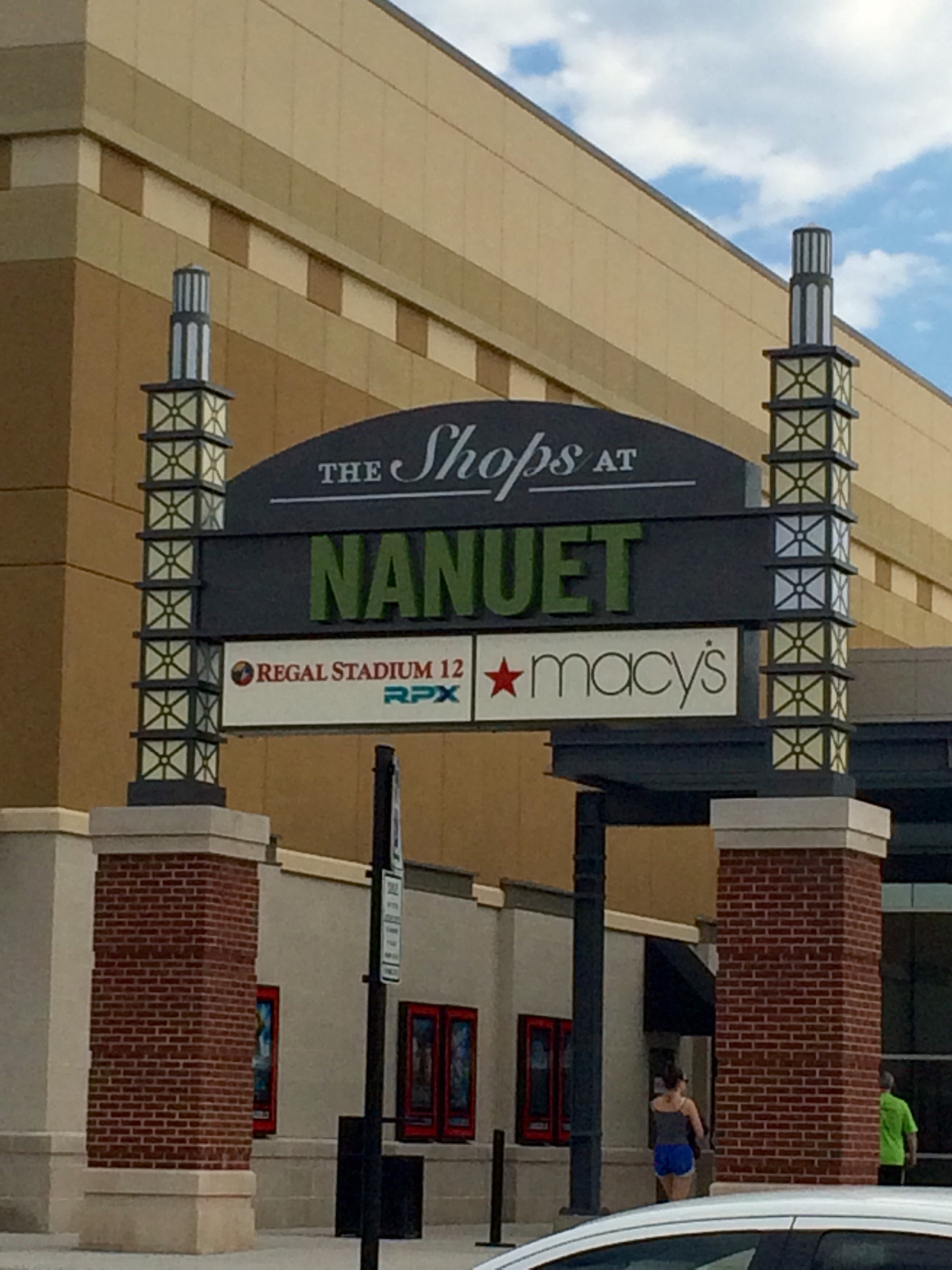
The Shops at Nanuet sign

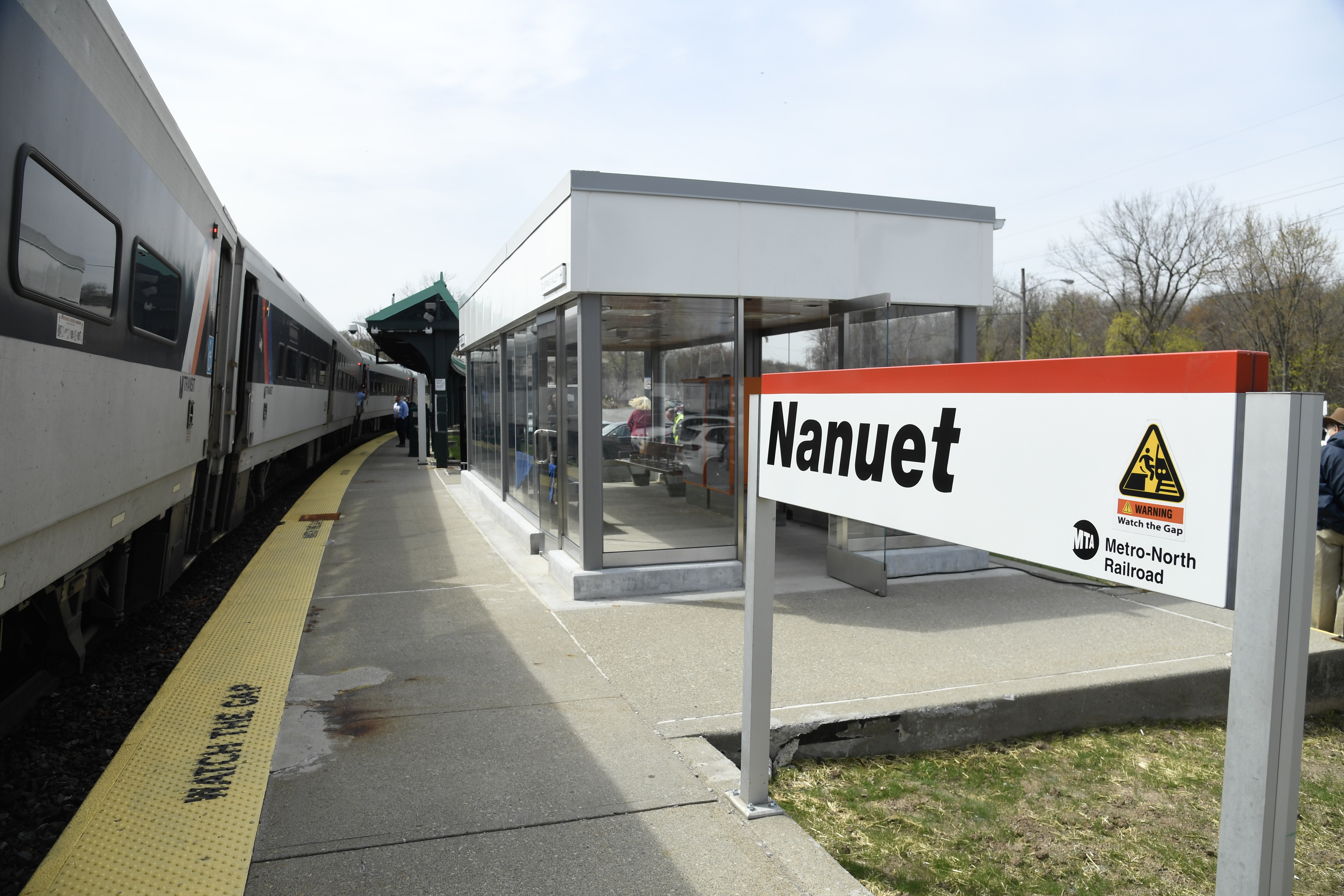
Nanuet Platform Shelter

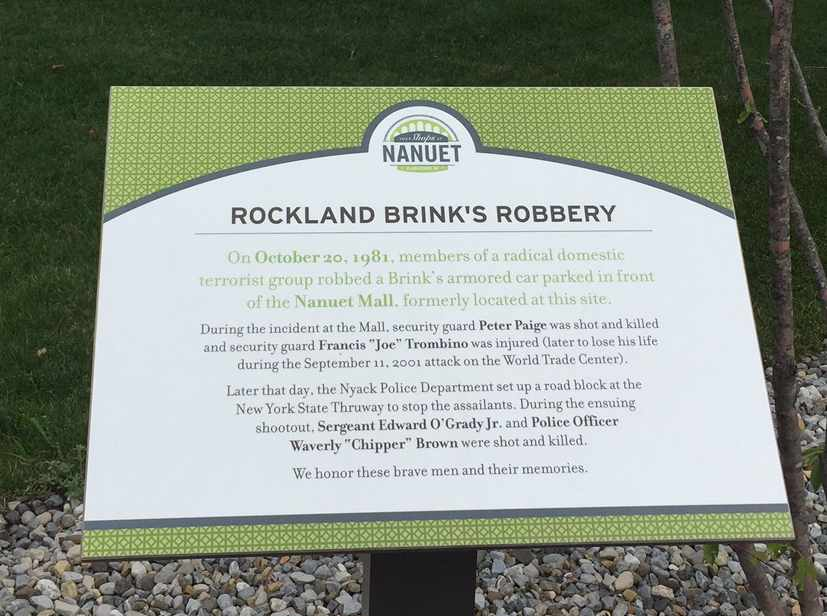
Brinks_Robbery_Nanuet2

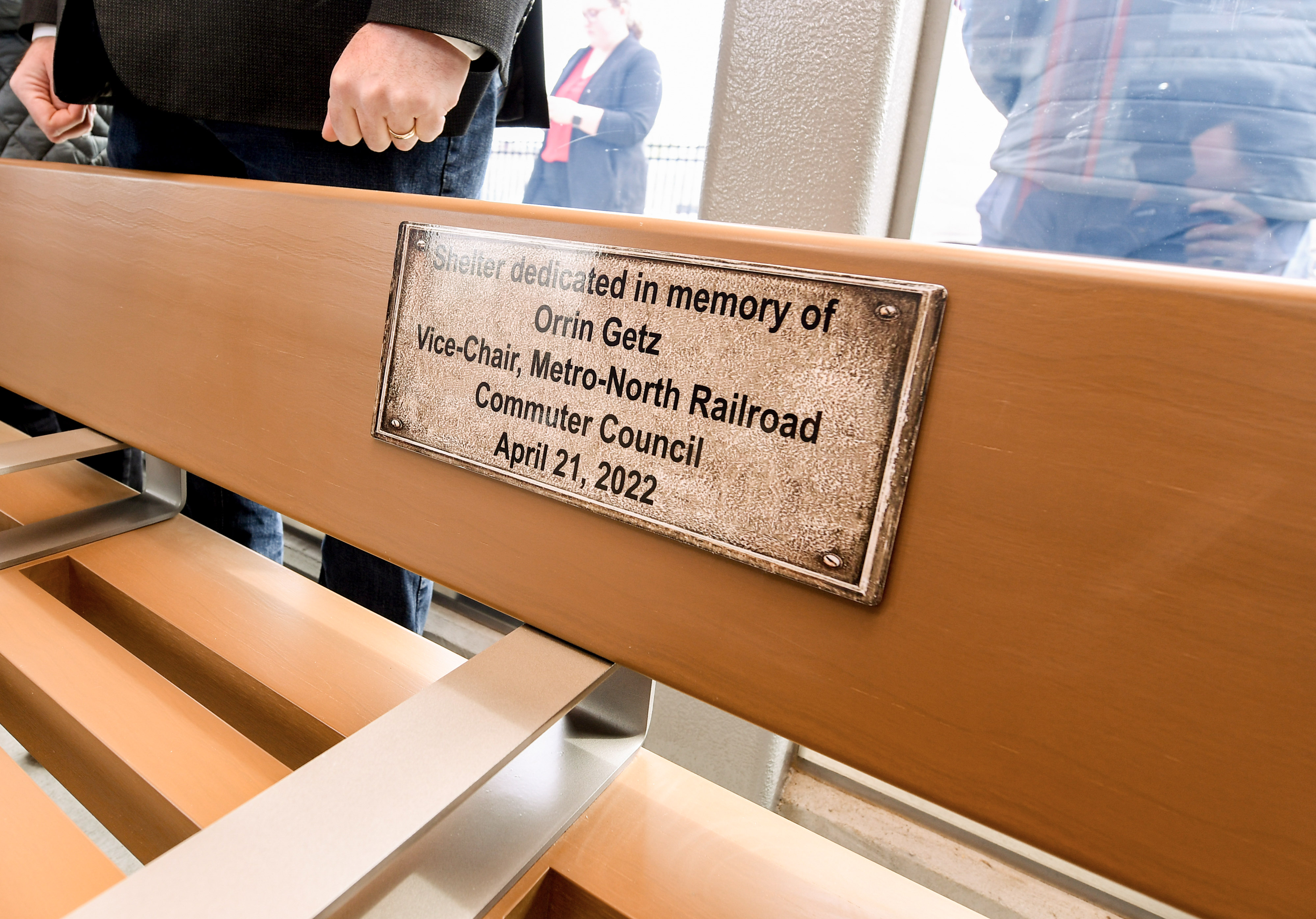
Nanuet_Platform_Shelter_(52018864267)

- Novo-Diveevo Russian Orthodox Convent, Cemetery and adult home of the Russian Orthodox Church Outside Russia.
- The Shops at Nanuet, formerly named Nanuet Mall (which opened in 1969), is an outdoor shopping mall operated by Simon, opened in October 2013.
- Nanuet Star Theatre, formerly (Nanuet Theatre -Go-Round) on Rte 59 was the recording location for the Kiss album Rock and Roll Over in 1976. This location has also hosted many concerts from 1973 to 1979.
- The Rockland County Times, Rockland's only paid weekly newspaper publication, has its offices in Nanuet.
- Nanuet station is the second-to-last train stop in the Pascack Valley Line train line, stretching from Spring Valley, New York to the Hoboken Terminal in New Jersey.

== In popular culture ==
"Revival of Melee 5", a Super Smash Bros. Melee tournament held in Nanuet on November 17–18, 2012, has garnered controversy in the Super Smash Bros. community. In the winners' semifinals match between players Mew2King and Unknown522, an unusual rule meant that game 5 of their best-of-five series had to be replayed. This resulted in Mew2King, who won the original game 5, losing the replay.
