= Wakefern Food Corporation =

Cooperative group of supermarkets in the United States

- Company type: Private
- Founded: 1946; 80 years ago in Newark, New Jersey, U.S.
- Founders: Lawrence Weiss; Sam Aidekman; Al Aidekman; Abe Kesselman; Leo Eisenberg; Dave Fern
- Headquarters: 5000 Riverside Drive, Keasbey, New Jersey, U.S.
- Key people: Sean McMenamin (chairman); Mike Stigers (president)
- Services: computer services; insurance; advertising; marketing; merchandising; procurement
- Revenue: ▲US$20.7 billion (2025)
- Members: 48 (2023)
- Number of employees: ~ 80,000 (2021)
- Divisions: ShopRite; Price Rite Marketplace; The Fresh Grocer; Dearborn Market; Gourmet Garage; Fairway Market; Di Bruno Bros.; Morton Williams
- Website: www2.wakefern.com

Wakefern Food Corporation is an American company that was founded in 1946 and is based in Keasbey, New Jersey. It is the largest retailers' cooperative group of supermarkets and the fourth-largest cooperative of any kind in the United States. Wakefern was the largest private employer in New Jersey in 2018, with 40,200 employees. As of 2023, Wakefern has 48 member companies who own and operate 365 supermarkets, under the ShopRite, Price Rite Marketplace, The Fresh Grocer, Dearborn Market, Gourmet Garage, and Fairway Market brands in New Jersey, New York, Connecticut, Pennsylvania, Maryland, Delaware, Massachusetts, New Hampshire, and Rhode Island.

== History ==
=== Meaning of the Wakefern name ===
The name "Wakefern" is a portmanteau of the founders' names: W for Lawrence Weiss, A for Sam and Alex Aidekman, K for Abe Kesselman, E for Leo Eisenberg, and FERN for Dave Fern, although the company adopted the name ShopRite for its stores in 1951.

=== Cooperative overview ===
Wakefern owns one of the Northeast's largest trucking fleets and is the fourth-largest cooperative in the United States. In fiscal year 2016, its revenue was $16 billion, and $16.3 billion in 2017. In 2011, Supermarket News gave Wakefern its Retailer Excellence Award and both The Griffin Report and Progressive Grocer named Wakefern its Retailer of the Year. In 2012, the company was named one of the Best Places to Work in New Jersey by NJBIZ Magazine. As of 2011, Wakefern was ranked 17th by sales among all supermarket operators in the United States.

Wakefern also created and operates or franchises the Price Rite limited-assortment chain (based in Wethersfield, Connecticut) of stores in Connecticut, Maryland, Massachusetts, New Hampshire, New Jersey, New York, Pennsylvania, Rhode Island, and Virginia. Dearborn Market is a supermarket in New Jersey. Readington Farms, Inc. processes and distributes milk products in New Jersey, Pennsylvania, Delaware, New York, Connecticut, Massachusetts, and Rhode Island.

On August 1, 2013, Wakefern added The Fresh Grocer banner, an eight-store chain based in Drexel Hill, Pennsylvania, when Burns Supermarkets joined the cooperative. One of the stores was converted to the ShopRite name while the others retained the Fresh Grocer name. The banner has since been adopted by stores operated by other members of the cooperative.

Wakefern supplies all of its members' ShopRite stores as well as the Price Rite and Fresh Grocer chains, and Dearborn Market. In July 2007, the cooperative announced that for the first time it was offering its wholesale services to third-party supermarket operators, in the Northeastern United States and other areas of the country. Since then, Wakefern has announced deals to supply the Gristedes and Morton Williams chains of supermarkets in the New York City area, Heinen's Fine Foods chain in Ohio, as well as The Market Place in Bermuda.

Wakefern also provides its members' stores with services such as computer services, insurance, advertising, marketing, merchandising and procurement.

Member stores include the publicly traded Village Super Market.

As of 2023, Wakefern has a total of seven warehouses in New Jersey and Pennsylvania.

Mike Stigers became president of Wakefern effective June 1, 2023. Stigers had been CEO of Cub, a Minnesota-based grocery chain and subsidiary of publicly traded United Natural Foods.
