= ShopRite =

American supermarket chain

- The current logo (2002–present)

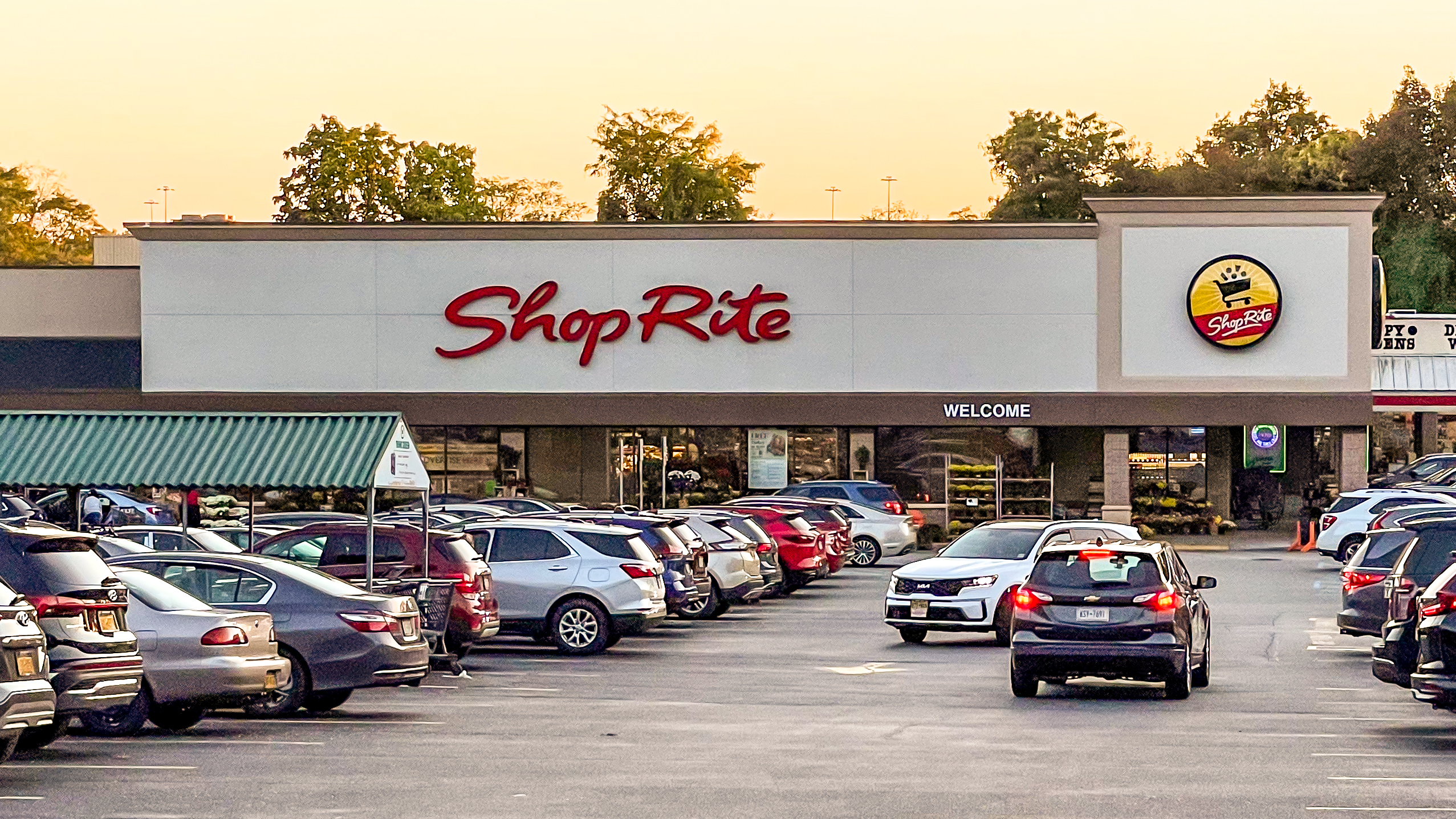
- Corporate Store in Croton-on-Hudson, New York
- Type: Subsidiary
- Industry: Retail (Supermarket)
- Founded: 1946 (80 years ago) in Newark, New Jersey, U.S.
- Headquarters: Keasbey, New Jersey, U.S.
- Number of locations: 321
- Area served: Connecticut, Delaware, Maryland, New Jersey, New York, Pennsylvania
- Products: Bakery; grocery; delicatessen; health and beauty; frozen foods; produce; seafood; meats; dairy; general merchandise; floral; alcoholic beverages; snacks; pet supplies; salad bar (some locations)
- Services: Grocery; Pharmacy; Online shopping and home delivery
- Members: 50
- Parent: Wakefern Food Corporation
- Website: shoprite.com

ShopRite is an American retailers' cooperative of supermarkets with stores in six Northeastern and Mid-Atlantic states: Connecticut, Delaware, Maryland, New Jersey, New York and Pennsylvania.

Based in Keasbey, New Jersey, ShopRite consists of 50 individually owned and operated affiliates with over 300 stores, all under its corporate and distribution arm, Wakefern Food Corporation. Wakefern itself owns and operates 28 of the locations through subsidiary ShopRite Supermarkets. Several Wakefern members own and operate single ShopRite stores, while most own multiple locations. The average Wakefern member operates six stores. The Saker family owns and operates the most ShopRite stores in the cooperative (40) throughout Monmouth, Ocean, and Mercer counties in New Jersey.

ShopRite has been the largest food retailer in New Jersey for close to 70 years and is also number one in the entire New York metropolitan area. Since 2011, ShopRite is also the largest retailer of food in the Philadelphia metropolitan area, pushing long-dominant Acme Markets to second place and, in 2013, to third place. As of 2011, Wakefern was ranked 17th by sales among all supermarket operators in the United States. In a 2022 survey by Newsweek, ShopRite was named the "Most Trusted Grocery Retailer" in the Northeast.

== History ==
=== Early beginnings ===
1951–1974 ShopRite logo

ShopRite originated in 1946, when a Del Monte sales representative talked to independent grocers in Newark, New Jersey. The grocers were having problems getting reasonable prices for wholesale goods. The Del Monte representative suggested the grocers try cooperative buying. Seven of the grocers agreed, paying $1,000 each to launch Wakefern Food Corp., which was incorporated on December 5, 1946. In 1951, the company had reincorporated in New Jersey using the trademark name ShopRite in an effort to consolidate the marketing of involved stores under one name.

In 1958, ShopRite cut prices by 10% as an alternative to giving away trading stamps, which other supermarkets in New Jersey were doing. The move was successful, drawing customers and helping create more ShopRite stores. By 1961, ShopRite had 70 members, totaling $100 million in annual sales.

=== The breakaway of Supermarkets General ===
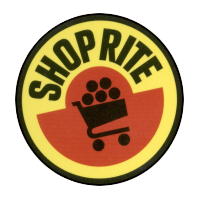
1974–2002 ShopRite logo

One large member, Supermarkets General, pulled out of Wakefern in the late 1960s, halving the number of stores. The Supermarkets General stores became Pathmark in 1968. The surviving Wakefern members increased their efforts, adopting the management tenet of "one member, one vote," and actively expanded. By the late 1970s, the volume lost from Supermarkets General's departure was restored.

For many years, ShopRite and Pathmark were extremely competitive on price in the New York Metro area, and each one had its loyal customer base. A highly leveraged management buy-out in the late 1980s left Pathmark saddled with too much debt, and the supermarket chain had no cash to fix up its stores, or invest in lower prices. At the same time, ShopRite stores were being replaced and rebuilt, stealing market share away from Pathmark. On November 23, 2000, Big V Supermarkets, which operated 39 ShopRite stores in New Jersey and New York, filed for Chapter 11 bankruptcy and announced that several ShopRite stores would close.

The Pathmark chain was sold to A&P in 2007. A&P ran Pathmark as a division, but was unsuccessful in turning around the banner's fortunes. A&P filed for bankruptcy and sold or liquidated its stores in 2015, including approximately 150 Pathmark stores. Wakefern and its cooperative members acquired nine Pathmark locations along with several other former A&P banners with the intention of opening ShopRite, Price Rite and The Fresh Grocer locations.

=== The "Can-Can Sale" ===
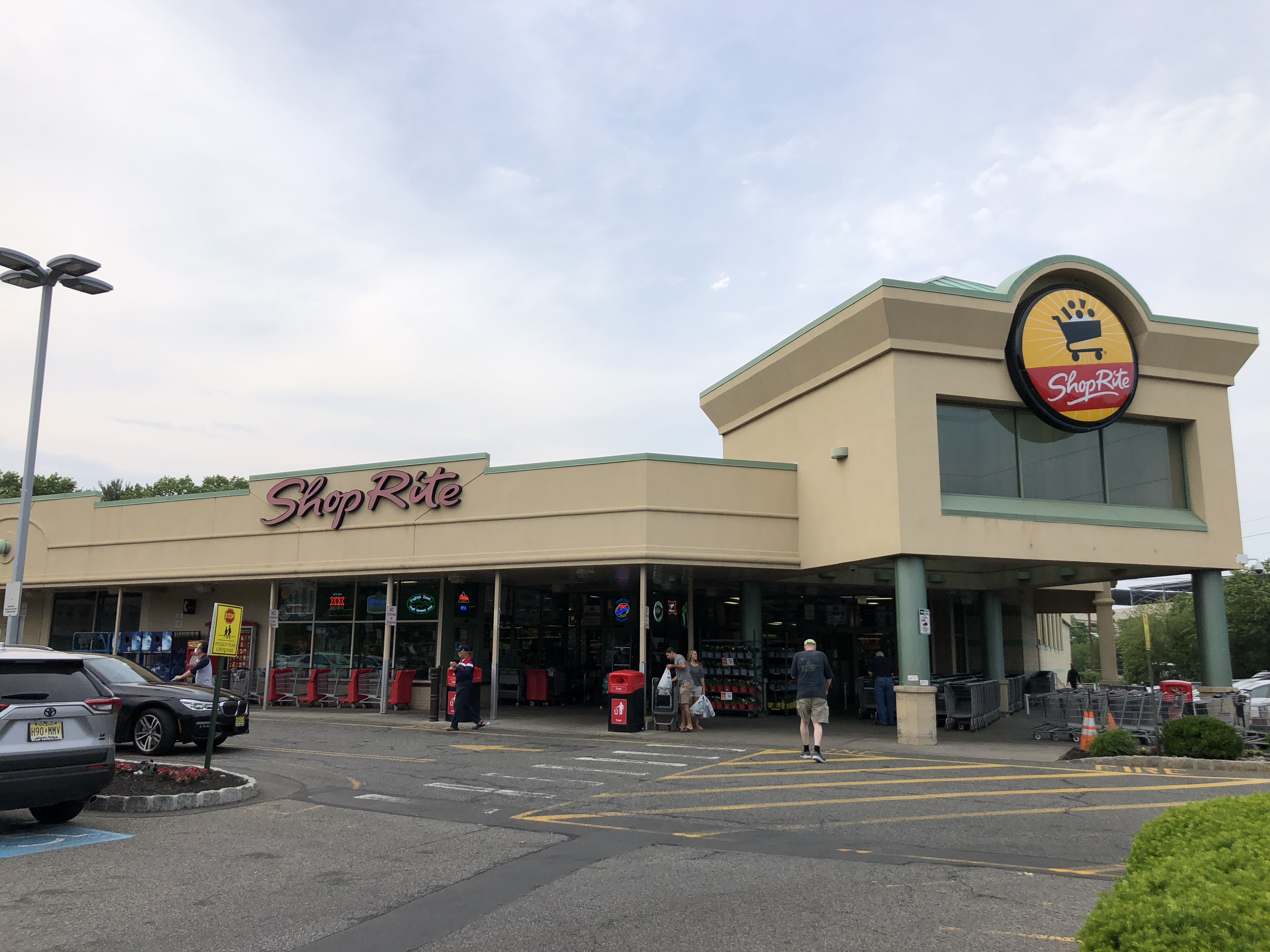
ShopRite location in Rochelle Park, New Jersey, owned by Glass Gardens

In 1971, ShopRite introduced their Can-Can Sale, where canned goods (and eventually other products) were placed on steep discounts, and is held in January. Until the early 1990s, the sale was held in the second and third weeks of January but expanded to the entire month. Animated commercials for this promotion feature a chorus line of cancan dancers and a French artiste, though the style changed on several occasions over the years. In 2002, ShopRite expanded that sale to twice a year when they introduced the Summer Can-Can Sale, held in July.

In 2018, the Summer Can-Can Sale was discontinued, replaced with the "Can It Get Any Hotter?" sale, which itself was discontinued in 2023.

=== Price Plus Club and beyond ===
In 1989, ShopRite introduced the Price Plus Club Card, which eventually merged with the Check Cashing Card (for those that use it for that purpose as well); it is free of charge to acquire. Having a Price Plus Card enables shoppers to receive special weekly discounts, listed in circulars mailed with local newspapers. Most sales are chain-wide regardless of owner but sometimes in a particular region, valid for all area ShopRites, however some stores choose to put special items on sale based on stock. The Price Plus Card also tracks purchases and use of rewards.

In 1996, ShopRite launched its own line (with Dietz & Watson) of deli meats, cheeses and complements with its private label, Black Bear of the Black Forest, to compete against the expansion of Boar's Head in competitor's supermarkets. In 2011, over 15 million pounds of Black Bear slicing meats and cheeses were sold at ShopRite.

Since 1999, ShopRite has offered an online grocery shopping service at select stores, under the service name Order. Pickup. Deliver. (formerly ShopRite from Home until April 2022.) For an additional fee, customers can place an order for pickup or delivery through the ShopRite website or mobile app, ShopRite employees then fulfill a customer's shopping order at a local ShopRite with options for curbside pickup.

=== Store design ===
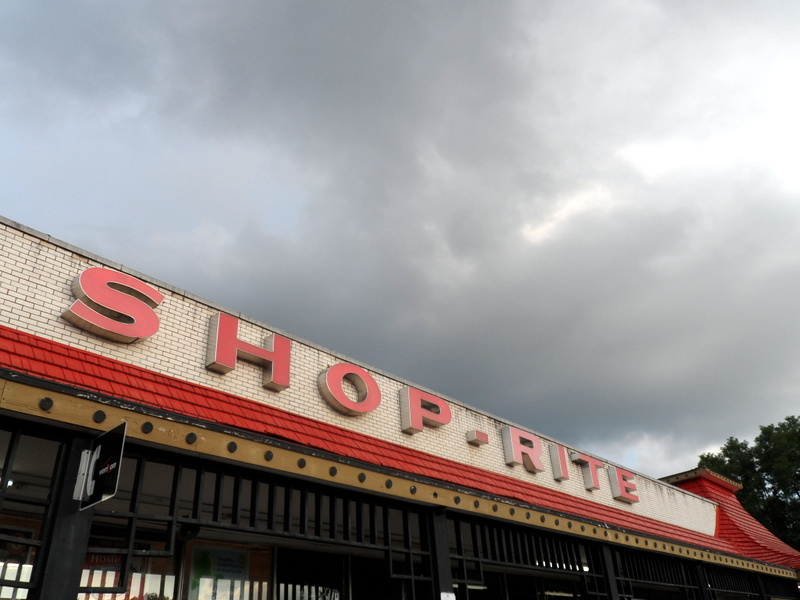
Former ShopRite location in West Caldwell, New Jersey, owned by Sunrise ShopRite

ShopRite at Wall Towne Center in Wall Township, New Jersey, August 2025

As a result of the cooperative system, there is no set format for building architecture, store layout, or color scheme of storefronts. Most stores are the product of the era in which they were opened, and the owner's style. For example, the former ShopRite in West Caldwell, New Jersey, owned by Sunrise ShopRite, had a Japanese motif inside and outside of the store (including rickshaws, an exit sign reading "Sayonara" and two Japanese-style phone booths). The RoNetco family of stores (Netcong, Byram, Newton, Franklin, Sparta, Flanders, Mansfield, Sussex, and Succasunna, New Jersey) have different looks on the outside (including the shopping carts and cart corrals), although the stores themselves have a similar layout. ShopRite stores that were previously other stores usually contain elements of the previous occupants. As large corporations buy up stores, recent years have brought a homogenization in building design and store layout.

=== Current system ===
As of 2024, ShopRite's base stretches northeast from the Washington metropolitan area in Maryland to the Hartford area in Connecticut, extending as far north as Hudson, New York. While New Jersey is home to the most ShopRite stores, the chain also has a strong presence in the New York City suburbs, and in Pennsylvania (mostly in the Philadelphia area). In 2010, ShopRite expanded its presence in Connecticut through the purchase of 11 former Shaw's stores.

In 2011–2013, ShopRite returned to the New York Capital District after exiting the market 23 years earlier. The SRS operating division opened stores in Niskayuna, Albany, Slingerlands, Colonie and North Greenbush. The Albany store opened on April 26, 2012; the Slingerlands store opened on September 30, 2012; and the Colonie store opened on April 7, 2013. The most recent addition was the North Greenbush location, which opened in December 2017. ShopRite currently has gas stations at the Albany and Colonie locations. Plans for additional future store locations had not been announced in late 2010. In 2013, ShopRite was the only unionized supermarket in the area. In October 2023, ShopRite announced that it would be closing all five of its Capital Region, NY stores due to "underperforming sales", marking this the second time they exited the market. All five stores in the region closed on November 18, 2023.

On July 20, 2015, competitor A&P filed for chapter 11 bankruptcy and announced plans to close or sell off all of its stores. ShopRite acquired 13 supermarkets in A&P's bankruptcy auction, including some that had been ShopRite locations before Supermarkets General (later acquired by A&P) broke off from the cooperative.

On January 26, 2021, ShopRite announced that it would close 62 pharmacies in its stores.

== Other chains and concepts ==
=== Price Rite ===
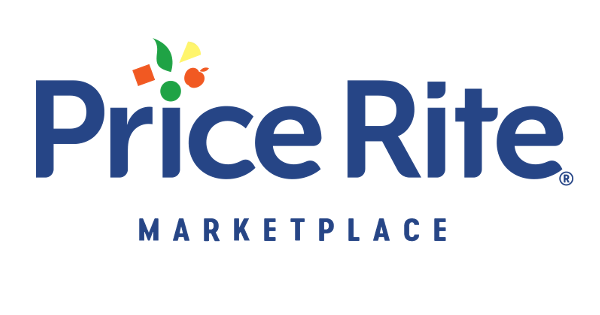
Price Rite

Wakefern also manages its wholly owned subsidiary, Price Rite, which is a limited-assortment chain of stores found only in Connecticut, Maryland, Massachusetts, New Jersey, New York, Pennsylvania, New Hampshire, Virginia, and Rhode Island. As of April 2018, there are currently 66 Price Rite stores; 63 of those are owned outright by Wakefern.

==== Price Rite in New Jersey ====
The Price Rite stores in New Jersey are operated individually by Wakefern's cooperative members; in 2014, Wakefern announced that the Price Rite banner would be made available to all of those members, so they can open and operate their own outlets. The North Jersey locations, in Garfield and Paterson, are operated by Inserra Supermarkets, while the South Jersey location (in Camden) was operated by the Ravitz Family, but closed in 2021.

==== Price Rite Warehouse Clubs (defunct) ====
The Price Rite name was first used in the early 1990s on Wakefern's failed warehouse club concept stores.

=== ShopRite Garden Center (defunct) ===
For many years, Foodarama operated a very small ShopRite Garden Center on Route 130 in East Windsor, New Jersey. In 2004, with the construction of a massive Home Depot directly adjacent to the small store, a decision was made to close the store and Foodarama moved its garden center operations into a 55,000-square-foot (5,100 m^{2}) former Frank's Nursery & Crafts store. The store had operated as a Franks location for four years before the company was liquidated, and the large building combined 23,000 sq ft (2,100 m^{2}) of interior selling space with 32,000 sq ft (3,000 m^{2}) of covered outside selling area, for a total of 55,000 sq ft (5,100 m^{2}). The ShopRite Garden Center closed in 2008.

=== ShopRiteDelivers.com ===
In December 2013, Wakefern launched the ShopRiteDelivers.com website to expand their digital footprint outside of their traditional markets in the Northeast. The website, focused on electronics, bulk-order baby-care, specialty foods, and health and beauty, has been well received, and has shipped orders to customers in all 50 states. In April 2021, the concept of ShopRiteDelivers was discontinued, with the site now only selling ShopRite and The Fresh Grocer gift cards.

=== The Fresh Grocer ===
Wakefern acquired the trademarks of this supermarket chain, which operates primarily in the Philadelphia area when its former owner, Pat Burns, joined the cooperative as its 50th member in August 2013. At the time, the chain had eight stores: five in Philadelphia, one in suburban Upper Darby, one in Wilmington, Delaware, and one in New Brunswick, New Jersey. The Upper Darby store became a ShopRite, and the New Brunswick and Southwest Philadelphia stores have since closed. The Fresh Grocer stores are smaller than modern ShopRite stores and place a greater emphasis on fresh and organic foods, upscale specialty items and extensive prepared-foods offerings than regular ShopRite stores, giving Wakefern and its members a format that can work in smaller urban locations. Wakefern executives were also quoted in the press as saying that as several The Fresh Grocer stores are located near college campuses, the chain would give Wakefern "new insight into the next generation of consumers" and enable it to reach new customers.

== Naming rights ==
ShopRite is the title sponsor for the ShopRite LPGA Classic.
