= Rex Gene Foods =

American supermarket chain

Rex Gene Foods was a United States supermarket chain of stores located in New Jersey from 1957 until the late 1990s. Rex Gene Foods was started in Brooklyn, New York as a butcher shop in 1957 before expanding into cash & carry and grocery in their New Jersey locations. Rex Gene Foods competed directly with Foodtown, Pathmark and ShopRite in New Jersey until it went bankrupt toward the late 1990s.

Rex Gene Food was involved in controversy during its later years.
