= Ice World =

Ice skating rink in New Jersey, US

Coordinates: 40.893°N 74.226°W

- Interactive map of Ice World
- Address: 670 Union Boulevard
- Location: Totowa, New Jersey, U.S.
- Capacity: 3,000
- Type: Ice rink/arena
- Surface: Ice

Tenants
- New Jersey Devils (practice only, 1982–1986); Main Events boxing (1978–1985?); World Wrestling Federation (1978–1981)

Ice World, often referred to as Ice World Arena or Totowa Ice World, was an American sporting venue located in Totowa, New Jersey. The arena was located on New Jersey Route 62 at an interchange with U.S. Route 46. It opened in 1977.

== Function ==
=== Ice skating and hockey ===
As its name implied, Ice World was principally an ice-skating rink that was also used for other functions. It had two regulation-size hockey rinks. The main rink had an open seating area and a glassed-in executive suite for watching the venue. General skating sessions for the public, and youth and adult hockey practices and games were regularly scheduled. It was the home for the New Jersey Rockets youth and semi-professional ice hockey club.

=== Hockey training facility ===
When the New Jersey Devils came over from Colorado in 1982, they chose Ice World as their practice facility. They stayed there until 1986, when the team signed a contract to utilize South Mountain Arena in West Orange for that purpose.

=== Boxing ===
Ice World also saw heavy use as a facility for professional boxing. At the time, trainer Lou Duva's son Dan was operating Main Events, a promotional company, out of Totowa and since Ice World had a seating capacity of 3,000 people, he began promoting shows there in 1978. Over thirty cards promoted by Dan Duva took place inside Ice World, with more than a few of them taking place before a nationwide television audience on ABC.

=== Professional wrestling ===
Another major New York area promoter, Vincent J. McMahon, also utilized Ice World to bring his World Wide Wrestling Federation wrestlers to the local fans. The first such show happened in 1978, with Bob Backlund facing Spiros Arion in the main event. The company, which eventually became known as the World Wrestling Federation, would promote shows at Ice World until 1981.

== Demise ==
Eventually Main Events stopped promoting boxing events at Ice World, and the loss of the Devils to South Mountain Arena also hurt the revenue stream. The arena would close before the decade was out.

Shortly after Ice World closed its doors for good, the building was leased by Supermarkets General Corporation, which decided to convert the facility into retail space and reopened it as a Rickel Home Center. The store remained open through 1997, when it and the rest of the Rickel chain was liquidated after a bankruptcy filing.

After Rickel closed, the former Ice World became home to two clothing stores. The first was a concept store devised by off-price retailer Filene's Basement called Aisle 3, which opened in 1999 and was notable for only doing business on weekends while the rest of the week was spent stocking the store with merchandise. The idea failed and in 2000, Value City bought Filene's Basement and liquidated all of the stores.

After Aisle 3 went out of business, the former Ice World reopened as a Forman Mills warehouse store. It remained in that location until May of 2025, when the store's lease was cancelled.

Today, the former Ice World is now currently a K1 Speed center.
