= Atlanta City FC =

Future professional women's soccer team

- Founded: November 11, 2025; 12 months ago
- Stadium: Mercedes-Benz Stadium; Atlanta, Georgia
- Capacity: 28,000
- Owner: Arthur Blank
- League: National Women's Soccer League
- Website: atlcty.com

Atlanta City FC is an upcoming women's professional soccer team based in Atlanta that will begin play in the National Women's Soccer League in 2028 alongside a second expansion club in Columbus. Owned by Arthur Blank of Atlanta United FC and the Atlanta Falcons, it will play in Mercedes-Benz Stadium with Atlanta United.

== History ==
=== Background and announcement ===
Atlanta previously had two professional women's soccer teams named the Atlanta Beat, the first in the Women's United Soccer Association (2001–2003) and a second in Women's Professional Soccer (2010–2012). For nearly a decade, Atlanta had been viewed as a top candidate for NWSL expansion.

On November 9, 2025, The Athletic first reported the deal, and the franchise was officially awarded on November 11. The expansion fee was reported at a record $165 million, exceeding the $110 million paid by Denver Summit FC earlier in 2025. Mercedes-Benz Stadium, which the team will share with Atlanta United, is expected to be modified for an NWSL capacity of approximately 28,000. According to ESPN, the club is planned to debut in the 2028 NWSL season alongside an expansion team in Columbus.

=== Front office ===
In March 2026, AMB Sports + Entertainment (AMBSE) named Mauricio Culebro, formerly president of Tigres UANL, as President of Soccer overseeing both Atlanta United and the NWSL franchise. The following month, Deandra Duggans, previously chief marketing officer of the Las Vegas Aces, was named the club's Vice President and Chief Business Officer, and in May 2026, Keith McCloat, previously of the New York Mets, was named Vice President and Chief Financial Officer.

Culebro said the NWSL club should develop an identity distinct from Atlanta United while benefiting from shared resources and institutional knowledge. Josh Blank and AMBSE CEO Rich McKay similarly described the two clubs as separate entities that would collaborate and share best practices while maintaining distinct identities.

On November 20, it was reported that Chief Business Officer Deandra Duggans was no longer with the organization."Deandra Duggans No Longer With Atlanta City FC, AMBSE Confirms". VIPs of Atlanta Soccer. November 20, 2026.

=== Training facility ===
In December 2025, the City of Marietta purchased approximately 34 acres (14 ha) of land at 1033 Franklin Gateway for $18.5 million while seeking to attract the incoming NWSL club's training facility. Mayor Steve Tumlin said pursuing the NWSL project was his "main objective," while AMB Sports + Entertainment said it was still evaluating multiple potential training sites.

In early 2026, the club reached an agreement with the city of Marietta to acquire a 33-acre site on Franklin Gateway SE for a dedicated training facility, with construction breaking ground on April 24, 2026. Plans call for a 38,000-square-foot facility with four full-size fields. The project is part of an AMBSE investment in the Franklin Gateway corridor reported at approximately $200 million when combined with the existing Atlanta United training facility. In May 2026, Marietta's Development Authority approved a tax-incentive agreement tied to the project.

=== Sponsorship ===
In February 2026, AMBSE announced Aflac as the team's front-of-kit jersey sponsor in a seven-year agreement reported to be among the largest jersey sponsorships in women's sports history.

=== Name and identity ===
As of mid-2026, the franchise had not announced a permanent name, crest, or color scheme, instead using "NWSL Atlanta 2028" as a working identity. According to the team-focused outlet Scarves and Spikes, Arthur Blank said in April 2026 that the club's name and branding would likely be revealed in the fall of 2026, and that "Atlanta United Women" would not be used, since the Atlanta United trademark is held by Major League Soccer rather than AMBSE.

On September 28, 2026, the club unveiled its brand identity, crest, and name, which was revealed to be Atlanta City FC. The crest features a stylized phoenix with a hidden "A", a symbol featured on the seal and flag of Atlanta to represent the city's continued resurgence, around the phoenix is the dogwood symbolising year round resilience, and roots are featured representing the large amount of trees and the continued cultural and historical legacy of the city. The colors are red, peach, platinum and black.
