= Rickels =

Rickels is a surname. Notable people with the surname include:

- David Rickels (born 1989), American martial artist
- Laurence A. Rickels (born 1954), American literary and media theorist

== See also ==
- Rickel
