= North Park Plaza =

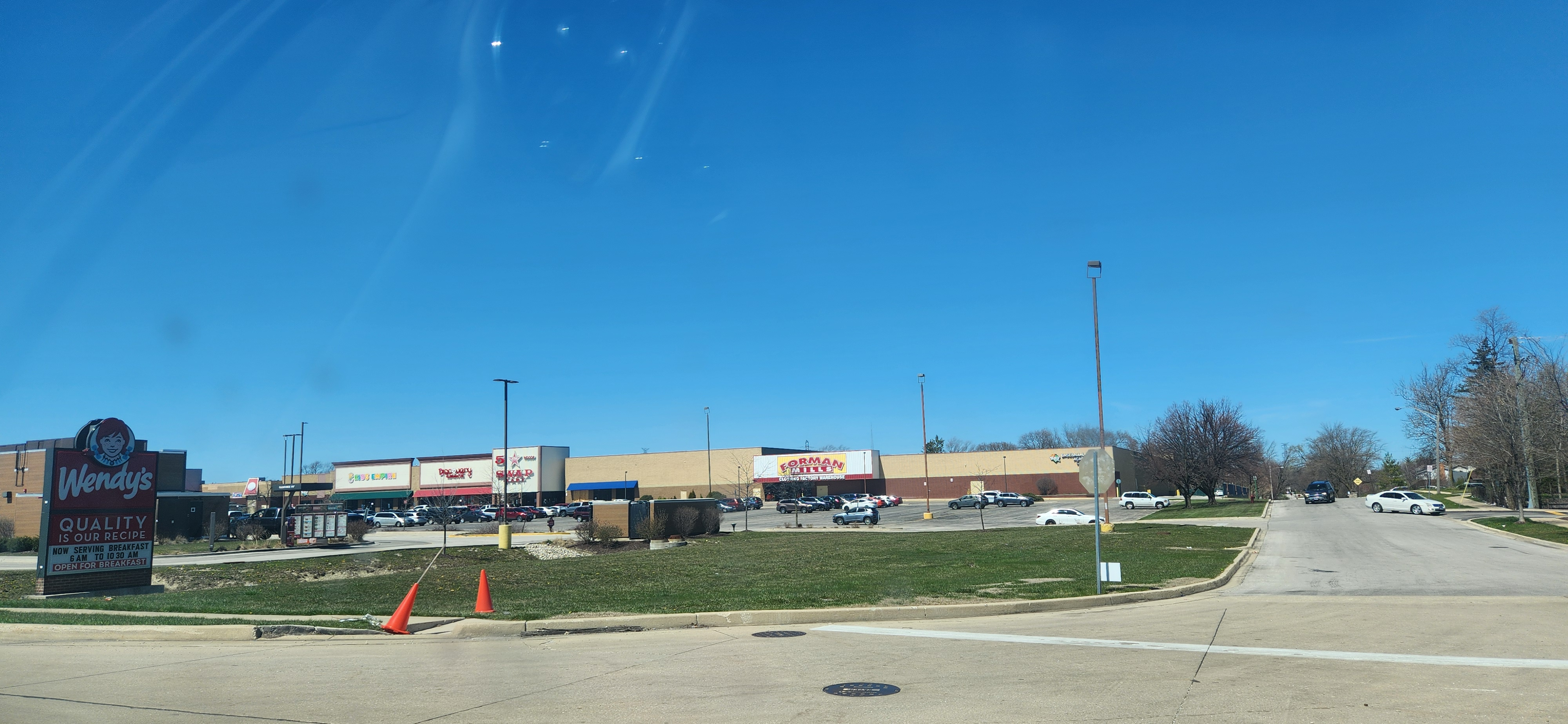
- Location: Villa Park, Illinois, United States
- Coordinates: 41.9067°N 87.9863°W
- Address: 270 W North Ave
- Opened: 1973
- Num. of stores: 12
- Num. of anchor tenants: 5
- Floor area: 340,000 sq ft (32,000 m^{2})
- Floors: 1 (formerly 2)

North Park Plaza is a shopping center in Villa Park, Illinois. It began as an indoor mall known as North Park Mall. It opened in 1973 as a 340,000 square foot enclosed shopping center. Anchors such as Robert Hall Village clothing store, Dominick's Finer Foods, and JCPenney were found in the mall.

The shopping center contains Fruit Market, Forman Mills and Discovery.

== History ==
Original anchor tenants included Robert Hall Village, Dominick's and JCPenney. Robert Hall closed and became Kmart. Kmart closed in 2000 due to failing sales and became the main mall entrance to the swap market. JCPenney closed March 2001 and became Ames Discount Department Store in November 2001 during the short re-entrance to the Chicago market. Ames closed in 2002 after bankruptcy and the store became HOBO.

In the mid-1990s, Dominick's closed and the Fruit Market opened before Staples came. HOBO relocated to the former Robert Hall/Kmart store. Staples and Pet Supplies Plus stores opened in 2005.

White Castle and Advance Auto Parts opened in the area in 2006. Forman Mills opened in late 2014. In the Spring of 2016, a strip plaza with Chipotle Mexican Grill, Firehouse Subs, Dunkin' Donuts and four other services were built. On August 21, 2017, Wendy's opened to customers. HOBO closed on December 20, 2018.
