= Job Creators Network =

Conservative U.S. advocacy group

- Website: www.jobcreatorsnetwork.com

The Job Creators Network (JCN) is a conservative U.S. advocacy group founded by Bernie Marcus, the co-founder and former CEO of Home Depot.

The organization has received funding from the Marcus Foundation, the Mercer Family Foundation, and Phil Anschutz.

== Activities ==
The Job Creators Network was originally founded in 2010 under the name The Job Creators Alliance. JCN launched a "Bring Small Businesses Back" (BSBB) campaign in 2016. In April 2016, JCN hosted a BSBB event in Orlando featuring Frank Luntz, Mike Gallagher, and a panel of small business owners.

Throughout 2017, JCN advocated for tax cuts through a campaign dubbed “Tax Cuts Now”, and offered the group's support to the Tax Cuts and Jobs Act, which offered temporary tax cuts to individuals and permanent tax cuts to corporations. The Tax Cuts Now campaign included a bus tour that made stops across the country. Former Speaker of the House Newt Gingrich penned an op-ed supporting the campaign in USA Today with Brad Anderson, former CEO of Best Buy and a member of JCN.

JCN launched another bus tour in 2018, with the goal of promoting the Tax Cuts and Jobs Act. Then-Speaker of the House Paul Ryan joined JCN at stops on the tour, including one hosted at a small business in Clinton, Wisconsin. The organization delivered thousands of petitions to Ryan in support of the legislation.

In February 2019, the group put up a billboard in New York City's Times Square blaming U.S. Representative Alexandria Ocasio-Cortez for Amazon's decision to abandon the building of the company's second headquarters in Queens. After the congresswoman tweeted that the billboard was "wack", JCN put up two more billboards, one saying "Hey AOC, saw your wack tweet", the other, "Hey AOC, this billboard cost about $4,000. But you cost NY 25,000 jobs and $4,000,000,000 in annual lost wages."

In May 2021, JCN filed a lawsuit against Major League Baseball and the Major League Baseball Players Association after the league decided to move the All-Star Game from Atlanta to Denver in protest over Georgia’s voting laws. JCN highlighted this lawsuit in a series of Times Square billboards, including one criticizing MLB Commissioner Rob Manfred, saying he has “no balls, all strikes.” A judge ruled against JCN and the lawsuit was dropped.

JCN regularly distributes a “Defender of Small Business” award to members of Congress, with past recipients including Missouri Rep. Blaine Luetkemeyer and Minnesota Rep. Jim Hagedorn. The organization also runs the "Information Station" website, which offers explainer-type videos and articles from a pro-business perspective.

=== Advocacy during COVID-19 pandemic ===
During the COVID-19 pandemic, JCN oversaw campaigns on both healthcare policy and business policy. JCN hosted a petition on its "Healthcare for You" website for doctors to show their support for the drug hydroxychloroquine, which had not been approved by the FDA for coronavirus treatment. The organization pledged to deliver the petitions to the White House and to “protect physician autonomy and medical decision-making as we stand in harm’s way to care for the American public.” President Donald Trump and other White House staff had financial ties to drugmakers that are ramping up production of the drug.

At the start of the pandemic, JCN president Alfredo Ortiz was in direct contact with Steven Mnuchin, speaking with him three times in one day during stimulus package discussions. Ortiz recommended having private banks distribute PPP loans, rather than the Small Business Administration, a change Mnuchin implemented in the final policy. JCN joined the Save Our Country coalition to advocate for governments to allow small businesses to reopen during the pandemic. In 2021, the organization announced its intentions to sue the Biden administration over its vaccine mandate for private businesses with more than 100 employees.

=== Advocacy against student loan forgiveness ===
In October 2022, the Job Creators Network Foundation Legal Action Fund filed a lawsuit against the U.S. Education Department and its then-secretary, Miguel Cardona, seeking to block the Biden administration’s student loan debt forgiveness program. U.S. District Judge Mark T. Pittman, who was appointed by Trump, struck down President Joe Biden’s student loan forgiveness program in November 2022.

== Membership ==
JCN was founded by Bernie Marcus, the co-founder and former CEO of Home Depot. Since January 2014, the organization's president and CEO has been Alfredo Ortiz, a former Pepsi and Kraft executive, while the president and director of communications for the JCN foundation is Elaine Parker. Its members include:

- Brad Anderson, former CEO and vice chairman of Best Buy
- Heidi Ganahl, founder and CEO of Camp Bow Wow
- Carlos Gazitua, CEO of Sergio's Restaurants
- Doug Haugh, president of Mansfield Oil
- Andy Puzder, CEO of CKE Restaurants
- Joseph Semprevivo, owner of Joseph's Lite Cookies
