= Daylin =

American retail company

Daylin, Inc.
- Type: Public; Conglomerate
- Industry: Retail
- Founded: 1960
- Founder: Amnon Barness
- Defunct: March 19, 1979
- Fate: Acquired by W.R. Grace & Co.

Daylin, Inc. was a major retail conglomerate based in Los Angeles and later Beverly Hills, California. Its best-known unit was Handy Dan Improvement Centers, which preceded Home Depot in the market niche the latter came to dominate. The company also briefly owned London Drugs as well as Great Eastern, which gave rise to Linens 'n Things.

Amnon Barness, an Israeli immigrant, co-founded the company in 1960 with an investment of $10,000. The company grew aggressively over the next two decades by acquiring retail operations around the United States, notably drugstores, home improvement centers, and discount stores. By 1969, Daylin had 50 corporate divisions and subsidiaries employing around 13,000 employees. In 1973 it was reported to operate 700 stores.

== Handy Dan ==
In 1968, Daylin acquired El Monte, California-based chain Angels Home Improvement Centers to add to its Handy Dan unit. Angels' founder, Sidney Kline, was hired as Daylin's chief of mergers and acquisitions. By 1973, when Kline left the firm, Handy Dan had grown to 43 stores with annual sales of $52 million in Oklahoma, Texas, Nebraska (Omaha, Bellevue), New Mexico, Colorado and California.

== Bankruptcy ==
By mid-1974, Daylin's aggressive expansion, intense local competition, and high indebtedness in a high-interest rate economic environment had led to significant financial problems, and the company began to sell off underperforming assets, including its drugstore operations. Arthur Blank, who had joined the company when Daylin acquired his family's pharmacy and risen to president of the Elliott's Drug Stores/Stripe Discount Stores unit, was invited to join Handy Dan by Bernard Marcus.

In January 1975, Sanford C. Sigoloff, who had just successfully lead Republic Corporation through restructuring, was brought in as president to oversee a turnaround. Daylin filed for Chapter 11 reorganization on February 26, 1975, the second largest retail bankruptcy within a year. Daylin was accordingly delisted from the New York Stock Exchange.

Sigoloff became known for his "slash-and-burn" strategy of appeasing investors at the expense of employees during restructuring, for which he was dubbed "Ming the Merciless" and "Mr. Chapter 11." Following his 260-page plan, which employees called the I.B.B. ("Infamous Black Book"), Sigoloff fired more than half the firm's 16,000 employees, but brought Daylin out of bankruptcy in 18 months. The Handy Dan and London Drugs operations were not included in the filing; women's clothing chain Diana, Handy Dan, and a line of hospital pharmacies would form the core of the surviving business.

Sigoloff came into conflict with Marcus and Blank over the structure and control of the Handy Dan division. In 1978 he fired them, ostensibly for allowing an employee to set up a fund to improperly fight a unionization effort in San Jose, California stores. Marcus and Blank founded The Home Depot the same year.

On January 5, 1979, W. R. Grace and Company, a conglomerate which already owned numerous hardware chains including Orchard Supply, made an unsolicited offer to acquire Daylin. It completed the acquisition on March 19.

== Operations ==
Brands owned by Daylin include the following:

- Angels Home Improvement Centers
- Diana
- Disco Department Stores (located in the West)
- Elliot's Drug Stores
- Great Eastern (discount department stores in New York and New Jersey)
- Gulf Mart (located in the South and Southwest)
- Handy Dan Home Improvement Centers
- H.C. Enterprises
- International Mercantile (import company)
- King Clothing
- London Drugs
- Miller's Discount Department Stores (located in the Midwest and South)
- Shoppers World
- Stripe Discount Health and Beauty Aid
- Wonderland (discount department stores located in the West)
