= Rickel =

American hardware store chain

- Type: Private (1953–1969); Stock Corporation (1969–1994); Private (1994–1998); Originally, "Do It Yourself" Home Center; Then, Home improvement
- Industry: Retail Home improvement
- Founded: 1953
- Defunct: 1998
- Fate: Bankruptcy
- Headquarters: 200 Helen Street, South Plainfield, New Jersey; 07080
- Key people: Al Rickel, Mort Rickel, Bob Rickel
- Products: Plumbing, heating, electrical supplies & hardware.
- Parent: Supermarkets General Corporation (1969–1994); Eos Partners L.P. (1994–1998)

Rickel (known as Rickel Brothers in its early years, Rickel Supermarts in the 1960s, and Rickel Home Centers in later years) was a chain of home-improvement centers based in northern New Jersey. The company’s first store opened in 1953 and for three decades Rickel was the leading hardware, plumbing, heating and electrical retailer in its region. At its peak Rickel operated over 90 stores, but competition from Home Depot, debt problems with its former parent, and an ultimately ill-advised merger with competitor Channel Home Centers led to a 1996 bankruptcy filing and liquidation and closure starting in late 1997 and continuing through early 1998.

== Founding ==
The origins of the company date back to 1946 when brothers Al, Mort, and Bob Rickel went into business for themselves in Newark, New Jersey. The brothers formed their own heating business, continuing a family tradition.

The original logo used by Rickel in the 1950s and '60s.

An anecdotal story says that a few years later, the brothers purchased a warehouse full of plumbing supplies for "next to nothing". In many cases, a contractor involved in heating is also involved in plumbing, but the Rickel brothers were not. Since they were unfamiliar with plumbing, they had no idea what the actual value of the haul was and sought help. A friend put them in touch with a plumber named Bill Ryan, who agreed to go through the items and determine how much they would sell for.

Plumbing supplies were usually sold wholesale at this time, which presented a problem for Al, Mort, and Bob. With the massive amount of supplies they had, it was likely going to take a significant amount of time for them to sell them off to local plumbers. They came up with an idea that, at the time, had been unheard of. The idea was to start a business selling the supplies to the general public at retail cost, with Ryan as their salesman. In that role, the brothers felt that he could not only sell the supplies to the people but pass along his plumbing knowledge to advise customers on how to fix their own toilets, sinks, drains, etc., and making sure they had the correct parts to perform the repair. So, in 1953 Al, Mort, and Bob opened up the first Rickel Brothers store in Union, New Jersey, and Ryan was warmly referred to as "employee number one" for his entire 35-year stint with the Rickel store chain.

Rickel was one of the first "do-it-yourself" home improvement stores, eventually expanding beyond plumbing supplies and selling heating and electrical supplies and tools in addition. An early slogan and jingle of the Rickel chain, which lasted in some degree to its 1997 closure, was "Rickel Helps You Do it Better- Do it Better With Rickel"- a reflection of the Rickel brothers' focus which included employees who could explain to customers how to perform their own home repairs. The concept took off and enabled 'Rickels' (as the store came to be known locally) to develop a loyal customer base.

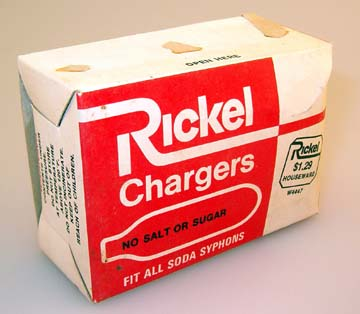
Classic Rickel logo on a box of soda syphon chargers.

== Growth ==
The Rickels began expanding quickly after their first store became a success and by the early 1960s were operating three locations, all in New Jersey: Succasunna, Paramus, East Brunswick, and a new location in Union. By 1967 the "Rickel Supermarts" chain (as the stores were now known) had six stores, all in New Jersey, opening in Menlo Park and Wayne. The Rickels then began expanding at a more rapid pace, opening more stores in New Jersey and entering the New York and Pennsylvania markets for the first time. During this time a corporate headquarters was established in South Plainfield, New Jersey, which also served as Rickel's primary distribution center.

The Rickel brothers sold the still-growing chain of Rickel Supermarts to Supermarkets General Corporation, the parent company of the Pathmark supermarket chain, in 1969. After the sale SGC renamed the chain "Rickel Home Centers", which lasted until Rickel's closure. In 1973 Rickel built their South Plainfield, New Jersey executive office headquarters, which doubled as a distribution and storage center that had been expanded to nearly 800,000 square feet by 1988. In 1975, the Rickel division of SGC recorded $80 million (~$371 million in 2025) in sales and was the dominant home improvement retailer in the region, far outselling its larger competitors Channel Lumber and Pergament. The subsequent decade was a time of continued expansion as the Rickel chain grew to over 30 stores by the mid-eighties, including one in the former Ice World arena in Totowa, New Jersey.

Faced with an increasingly competitive market, Rickel attempted to reinvent its image with an upscale decor-oriented store simply called "HōM" in 1990, tested as a prototype store in Toms River, New Jersey

However, Supermarkets General's fortunes were starting to turn as the company entered a financial downturn that it stayed locked in, in various forms, for the next two decades. While Rickel was doing well, its corporate sibling Pathmark was losing business and dragging the company's finances down with it. In 1987, the Dart Group made a hostile takeover bid to acquire SGC. In a move to avoid the takeover, management took the company private by engineering a $2.1 billion leveraged buyout. Merrill Lynch Capital Markets Inc. received 55 percent of the shares, Equitable Life Assurance received 30 percent and SGC management retained ten percent. The company's debt grew to $1.6 billion (~$3.48 billion in 2025) by early 1990, half of it in junk bonds, primarily as a result of the buyout. Servicing the debt became SGC's primary objective and largest problem.

== Home Depot competition ==
Around the time of Supermarkets General's cash flow problems, the Atlanta, Georgia-based home improvement chain Home Depot began to open stores in the New York/New Jersey metropolitan area. Although Rickel, Channel, Pergament, and local hardware stores all felt the effects of Home Depot's entry and quick expansion into their market area, Rickel's problems were made worse by its parent company's financial state. This helped lead to a somewhat contentious relationship between Rickel and Home Depot over the next few years.

An early example of the consequences of the rivalry between Rickel and Home Depot can be seen in an incident surrounding PBS' long running home improvement series This Old House. For many years, Home Depot has been one of the largest sources of financial support for the noncommercial program. But in 1989, show host Bob Vila was signed to be Rickel's spokesman and appeared in a series of television commercials for them. Since they were now sponsoring a program whose host worked for a competitor, Home Depot and their lumber supplier Weyerhaeuser announced they would be withdrawing their funding. The companies changed their minds after WGBH, the producer of This Old House at the time, fired Vila shortly thereafter with Steve Thomas becoming the show's new presenter. Vila, who would begin hosting his own syndicated home improvement series in 1990, would eventually be dropped by Rickel and would begin a long term relationship with Sears as a spokesman for their Craftsman Tools brand.

Combined with Home Depot's expansion and its parent company's debt problems, not only did Rickel find itself unable to compete with the rapidly growing Home Depot, but it also began to lose market share to its local competitors who were on more secure financial footing. By Fall 1993, it became apparent that Rickel's future was beginning to look grim. Supermarkets General was still in serious financial trouble as Pathmark's sales continued to slide, and the company chose to keep its focus on trying to bring its primary brand out of decline. As a consequence of this, Rickel was unable to receive the funding it needed to properly compete with the juggernaut that Home Depot was becoming. In 1994, Supermarkets General reorganized. The company changed its name to Pathmark Stores, Inc. and began looking for ways to divest itself of its varied retail properties including Rickel. In the summer of 1994, they found a solution.

=== Merger with Channel Home Centers ===
On August 26, 1995, a move by venture capital firm Eos Partners, L.P. resulted in a merger with one of Rickel's competitors. That day, Eos made separate deals with Pathmark and GE Capital to acquire both Rickel and Channel Home Centers, and announced that the two chains would be merging into one with the Rickel brand continuing forward. This added a total of 59 stores to the Rickel chain, increasing the total of locations to 92, and brought the company into markets it had not served before; to reflect their new direction, Rickel briefly rebranded itself as "The New Rickel" and adopted the slogan “Bringing it all closer to home".

However, all the news was not positive. Despite the addition of so many new stores to its fold, the sales they generated were not enough to fully pull Rickel out of the tailspin it had found itself in; in fact, the sudden massive expansion proved to be another burden on the company's finances. Also, the battle with Home Depot for market share was continuing to be an uphill one for Rickel, and the chain would soon find itself in significant legal trouble.

=== Home Depot sues Rickel ===
By 1995, Home Depot was establishing itself as New Jersey's home improvement leader and building stores almost anywhere demand existed, putting significant strain on Rickel and its competitors that had long been established before Home Depot's encroachment. One of these areas was a large vacant parcel of land on Orange Street in Bloomfield, New Jersey. Home Depot submitted a proposal to take over the land and build a massive store on it.

The Orange Street location was less than one mile from the Bloomfield Center strip mall where Rickel, at the time, was its longstanding anchor store. The center is located along Bloomfield Avenue, which is one of the most heavily traveled roads in New Jersey running from US 46 in West Caldwell to downtown Newark near Broad Street Station. Its location along Bloomfield Avenue enables it to draw not only from Bloomfield residents, but also shoppers from neighboring Belleville, East Orange, and Newark as the township's borders with all three municipalities are very close to Bloomfield Center.

However, like many of its fellow outlets the Bloomfield Rickel was a much smaller sized business than the massive Home Depot stores being built in and around New Jersey were. Rickel certainly was not in a good position as even though their store was in a centralized location, the Home Depot store would siphon away a significant amount of their customers. In addition, the store would have easy access as it was located very near Bloomfield's border with Orange and located near public transit on nearby Watsessing Avenue (including a New Jersey Transit rail station) and Exit 148 on the Garden State Parkway.

Rickel decided to fight the proposal. Its methods, however, led to Home Depot filing a lawsuit in New Jersey court in July of that year. Home Depot alleged that Rickel had engaged in a deceitful "smear campaign"; Rickel was accused of posing as a community action group that accused Home Depot of bringing an increase of car theft and violent crime everywhere they opened stores, specifically citing figures obtained from the police in Clifton, New Jersey, a neighboring municipality to Bloomfield where Home Depot first opened a store in 1992 (Rickel, at that time, was not doing business in Clifton; after the merger with Channel in 1994, Rickel took over the lone Channel Home Center in the city).

== Bankruptcy and liquidation ==
If things were not bad enough, by the end of 1995 Rickel discovered that their financial situation was significantly more unstable than they had realized. The new sales figures from its fifty-nine new stores had not done enough to correct the damage that the years of financial trouble that its former parent Pathmark had left on Rickel, and thus a bankruptcy filing was looming as a serious possibility. To try and stave it off, the company decided to close thirteen underperforming stores shortly after the Home Depot lawsuit was filed. This did not work, and on January 10, 1996, Rickel announced it had filed for Chapter 11 bankruptcy protection. More store closures followed, with another thirteen locations liquidated by July.

Although Rickel was starting to show signs of recovery that met with positive reactions, reality painted a different picture as the company appeared to be in a state of terminal decline. Rickel went through two more rounds of closures that ran into 1997; when those were done, the chain was almost half the size of what it had been just two years before, with 49 locations still operating.

In 1997 Rickel decided to shift focus again and focus less on being a direct competitor to Home Depot, which had now established itself as the New York area market leader in retail home improvement. Instead, Rickel decided to focus on things that made it unique compared to the larger, big-box chain. Although Rickel was one of the larger and more successful home improvement chains in the area prior to Home Depot's entry into its market, Rickel tended to operate in smaller facilities than Home Depot did even after its merger with Channel. For example, a typical Home Depot store was well over 100,000 square feet (9,300 m^{2}) in size. Rickel stores, by comparison, averaged approximately 40,000 square feet (3,700 m^{2}) with a handful of stores such as the Totowa, New Jersey store and the Wayne, New Jersey store being larger (the Wayne store was, in fact, the company's largest).

Rickel decided, as they had tried once before, to use their size to their advantage and define themselves as more of a neighborhood home center. Since both Rickel and Home Depot sold many of the same items, Rickel's strategy was to portray the stores as much easier to shop at than the immense Home Depot stores. The attempt did little, if anything, to either take business from Home Depot or lure customers to Rickel and in August 1997, a plan to allow the chain to remain open until at least February 1998 was rejected. Despite its best efforts, it now seemed that it was no longer a matter of if the still-in-bankruptcy Rickel could reverse its fortunes and stave off its demise but instead a matter of how much time the former home improvement stalwart had left before it would be forced to close its doors for good.

On October 11, 1997, Rickel vice president for marketing Greg Hanselman made the announcement that the company "ran out of cash" to operate the remaining 49 stores and that the chain was to begin liquidating. Most of the Rickels were closed by Thanksgiving 1997, with several more lasting until December as they received more merchandise from already shuttered stores. The last Rickel to close was its largest, with the Wayne store closing in early 1998.

Rickel still held leases on the 53 stores they were operating at the beginning of 1997, and office supply chain Staples picked up 41 of those leases, including Rickel's Bloomfield store that they had been sued trying to protect. Staples did not reopen all of the Rickel locations they purchased, however, as there were objections raised by some of the tenants and landlords involving six of the forty-one purchases. The company's distribution center, meanwhile, was retaken by Pathmark.

As far as the other stores mentioned in this portion of the article are concerned, the Totowa store was repurposed as a clothing retailer, first being occupied by Filene's Basement's Aisle 3 concept and later by Forman Mills, which closed in May 2025. An indoor go-kart racing facility and entertainment venue opened in the space in March of 2026.

The Clifton store, which was one of the six Staples purchases that did not become a Staples store, was subdivided after closing. One half was occupied by Dollar Express, which was eventually merged with Dollar Tree and still occupies the space today, while the other half was initially taken by Drug Fair. After Drug Fair's 2009 bankruptcy, the store was one of several that were immediately liquidated and closed within days of the bankruptcy filing. The space then served primarily as a seasonal pop-up home, with Spirit Halloween and Party City's Halloween City concept the most frequent occupants, until 2025, when an Indian grocery chain moved in.

After the Wayne store closed, the building was subdivided. Most of it was demolished, with Grand Union intending to build a supermarket on the property. However, after Grand Union's 2001 bankruptcy and sale, construction on the project was halted. Stop & Shop, which purchased many Grand Union locations during that period, took over the project in 2002 and opened the completed store in 2004. The portion of the building that was left became the T-Bowl II bowling alley, which was remains there to this day.

The year after Rickel shut its doors for good, in a strange twist, Home Depot decided to try its own hand at a smaller, neighborhood home center concept and created Villager's Hardware, which were similar to Rickel stores in their size and setup and included some scaled back versions of Home Depot departments like its plant nursery. The first location, coincidentally, opened in the former East Brunswick, New Jersey store Rickel occupied for thirty-plus years. Home Depot would open several more Villager's stores in the next year, but the company decided to discontinue the brand shortly thereafter and convert the stores to smaller Home Depot locations; these would eventually close along with all of Home Depot's Expo Design Center locations in 2009.

=== Fate of the Rickels ===
All three Rickel brothers have since died. Mort Rickel died at 61 in 1980; his two brothers would reach 90 before following him in death. Al Rickel died in 2008, and Bob Rickel died in 2014.

== See also ==
- List of defunct retailers of the United States
