= Brandt C. Louie =

Canadian accountant and businessman

Brandt C. Louie CM OBC
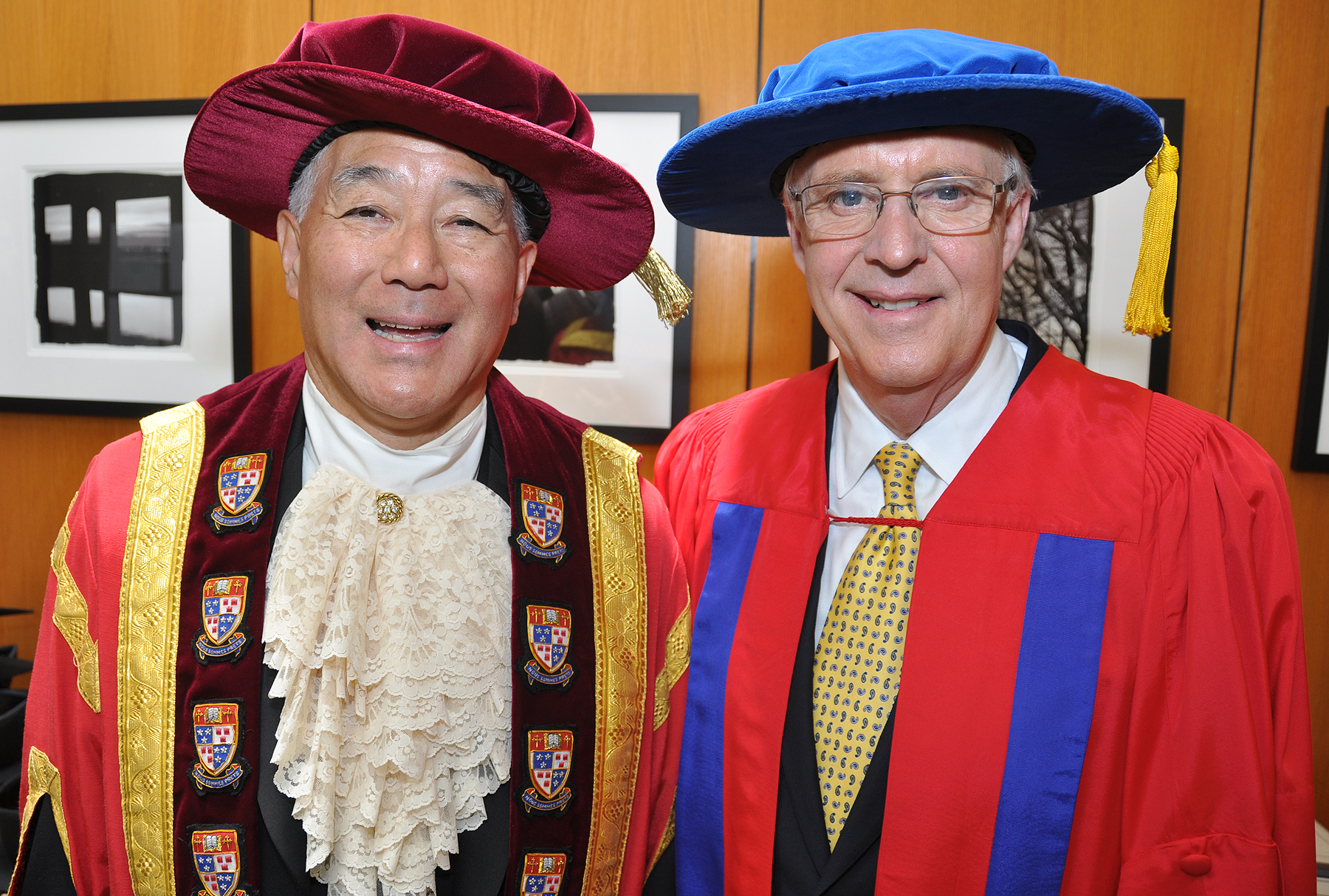
- Louie with Brian Williams
- Born: July 5, 1943 (age 83); Vancouver, British Columbia, Canada
- Education: University of British Columbia
- Occupations: accountant, businessman
- Spouse: Belinda Louie
- Children: 2 sons

Brandt Channing Louie (born 5 July 1943) CM OBC (Chinese: 雷震瀛; pinyin: Léi Zhènyíng) is a Canadian accountant and businessman. He is the president and CEO of H.Y. Louie Co. Limited (distributor to IGA stores in British Columbia), and Chairman of London Drugs Limited.

== Early life and education ==
Louie was born in Vancouver and earned his bachelor of commerce from the University of British Columbia (UBC).

== H.Y. Louie Group ==
After practicing as a chartered accountant, Louie decided to join his family business in 1972. In 1903, Louie's grandfather, Hok Yat Louie, who had immigrated to Canada from China, founded a general store in Vancouver. He was eventually named chairman and chief executive officer of London Drugs in 1998.

As CEO and chairman, Louie also oversees the Tong and Geraldine Louie Family Foundation and the London Drugs Foundation. In 2010, he was appointed chairman of Grosvenor Americas board of directors.

== Chancellorship ==
In 2002, Louie replaced Evaleen Jaager Roy as chair of the Simon Fraser University Board of Governors. A few years later, in 2005, Louie was appointed chancellor of Simon Fraser University (SFU).

== Awards and honours ==
In 2009, Louie was made a Member of the Order of British Columbia.

In 2012, he was inducted into the Canadian Business Hall of Fame. The following year, the University of Victoria honoured him as a Distinguished Entrepreneur. A few years later, he was the recipient of the EY Family Business Award of Excellence. In 2016, he was the recipient of an honorary degree from UBC.

In 2024, he was appointed to the Order of Canada.

Coat of arms of Brandt C. Louie

Notes
Granted 20 January 2022.
Crest
A demi-lion Or wearing an antique crown and holding a bauhinia flower between two maple leaves Gules.
Escutcheon
Per pale Gules and Or a Chinese dragon and a dragon combatant counterchanged.
Motto
Je Suis Prét (I Am Ready)

== Personal ==
Louie has two sons with wife Belinda who work in the business:

- Dr. Gregory Louie - Co President H. Y. Louie Co. Limited
- Stuart Louie - Co President H. Y. Louie Co. Limited and legal advisor

He resides in West Vancouver.
