= Bernard Marcus =

American billionaire businessman and philanthropist (1929–2024)

Bernie Marcus
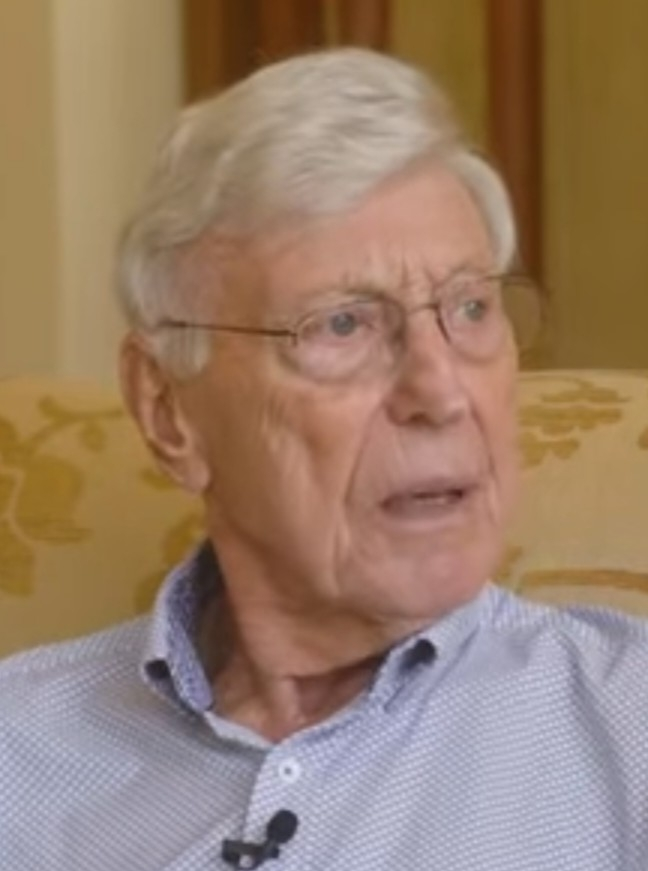
- Marcus in 2020
- Born: May 12, 1929; Newark, New Jersey, U.S.
- Died: November 4, 2024 (aged 95); Boca Raton, Florida, U.S.
- Education: Rutgers University (BS)
- Occupations: Businessman; philanthropist; founder of Home Depot
- Years active: 1978–2002 (at Home Depot)
- Political party: Republican
- Spouses: Ruth Rados (div. 1972) Billi Marcus (m. 1973)
- Children: 2 (1 deceased)

Chief Executive Officer of Home Depot
- In office 1978 – May 1997
- Preceded by: Post established
- Succeeded by: Arthur Blank

Chairman of the Board of Home Depot
- In office 1978 – May 31, 2002
- Preceded by: Post established
- Succeeded by: Robert Nardelli

Bernard Marcus (May 12, 1929 – November 4, 2024) was an American billionaire businessman. He co-founded Home Depot in 1978. He was the company's first CEO and first chairman until retiring in 2002. In November 2024, Forbes estimated his net worth at US$10.3 billion. He was a major donor to the Republican Party, including Donald Trump's presidential campaigns.

== Early life ==
Marcus was born to Russian Jewish immigrant parents, cabinet maker Joe and Sara Marcus, in Newark, New Jersey, on May 12, 1929. He was the youngest of four children and grew up in a tenement. He graduated in 1947 from South Side High School (since renamed as Malcolm X Shabazz High School). Marcus wanted to become a doctor, and was accepted to Harvard Medical School, but could not afford the tuition. He graduated from Rutgers University with a pharmacy degree. He was a member of the Alpha Epsilon Pi fraternity.

== Career ==
Marcus initially worked at a drugstore as a pharmacist but later moved to the retailing side of the business. He worked at a cosmetics company and various other retail jobs. He worked for Odell Inc. in California beginning in 1968 and then joined Daylin in Los Angeles in 1970. He became the CEO of Handy Dan Improvement Centers, a Los Angeles-based chain of home improvement stores. In April 1978, he and future Home Depot co-founder Arthur Blank were fired during a corporate power struggle at Handy Dan.

In 1978, they co-founded the home-improvement retailer Home Depot, with the help of merchandising expert Pat Farrah and New York investment banker Ken Langone who assembled a group of investors. The first two stores opened on June 22, 1979, in Atlanta.

Marcus served as the company's first CEO until May 1997 and also served as chairman of the board until his retirement on May 31, 2002. He was succeeded as CEO by Blank, who served until December 2000. Marcus was inducted into the Junior Achievement U.S. Business Hall of Fame in 2006.

Marcus was one of several business tycoons who opposed the Employee Free Choice Act, a proposal they claimed gave unfair advantage to labor unions in the United States. The EFCA would outlaw conducting employee union votes with secret ballots while allowing fines and injunctions when employees show they are being punished for union activity on the job.

In 2010, Marcus founded the Job Creators Network, a conservative advocacy group, with $500,000 in seed funding.

== Political activity ==
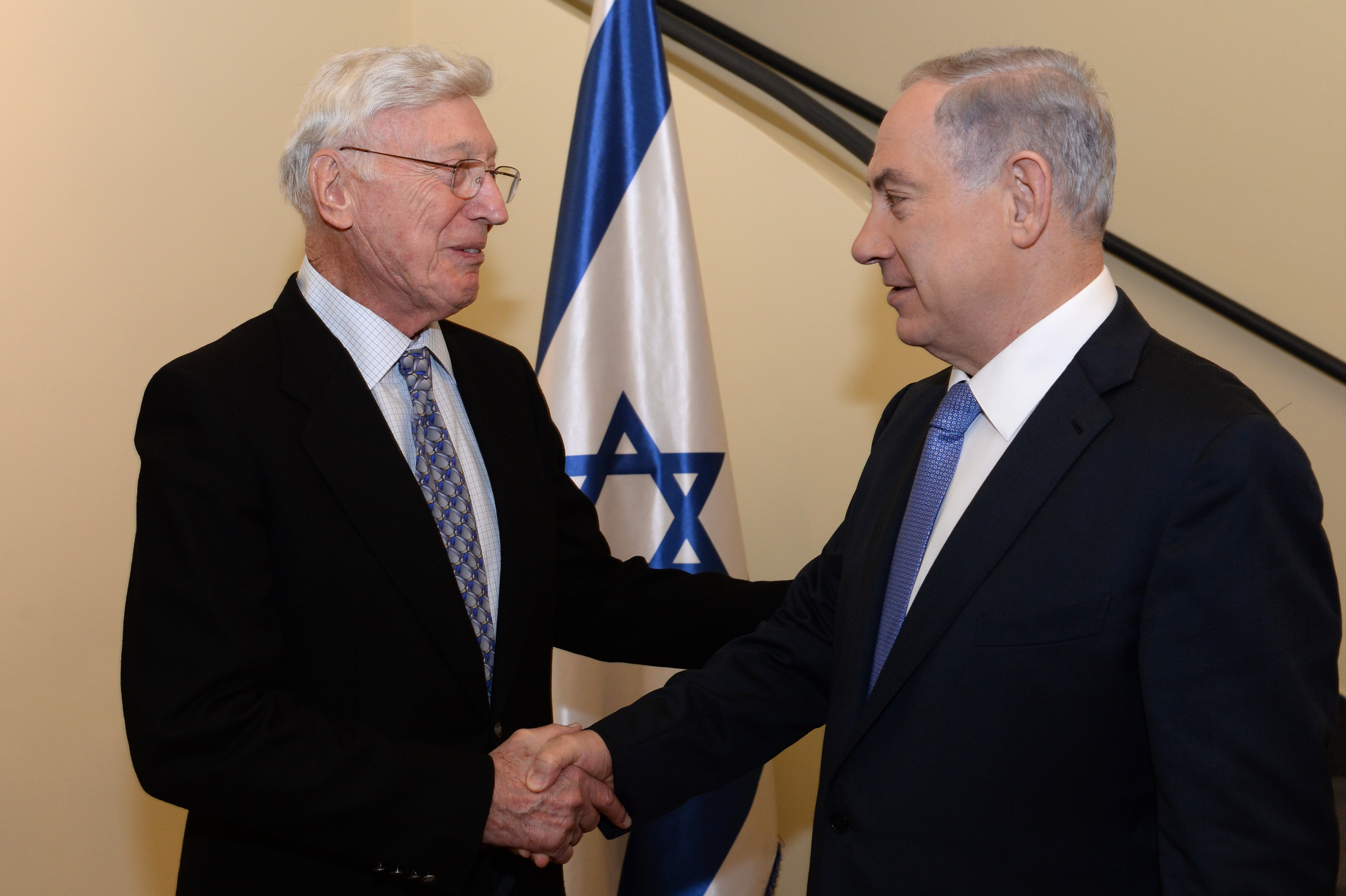
Marcus with Israeli Prime Minister Benjamin Netanyahu in Jerusalem, December 2014

In 2012, Marcus donated $10.7 million to Mitt Romney's 2012 presidential campaign, the maximum personal donation one can make, and was the biggest contributor to the campaign. In 2015, Marcus donated $1.5 million to super political action committees, supporting Jeb Bush and Scott Walker.

On June 1, 2016, Marcus publicly announced his support for Republican presumptive presidential nominee Donald Trump. He was one of Trump's largest donors, giving $7 million to his campaign. When Marcus announced in 2019 that he would financially support the Donald Trump 2020 presidential campaign, it triggered calls for a boycott of Home Depot. Together with his spouse, Marcus contributed $731,200 directly to Trump's 2020 presidential campaign and $10.7 million to political action committees supporting Trump.

In 2023, he donated $2 million to the pro-Israel lobby group AIPAC. In 2023, Marcus announced he would back Trump's third consecutive campaign. Job Creators Network, founded by Marcus, backed a lawsuit to overturn federal student loan forgiveness, which became part of the successful Supreme Court case Biden v. Nebraska.

== Philanthropy ==
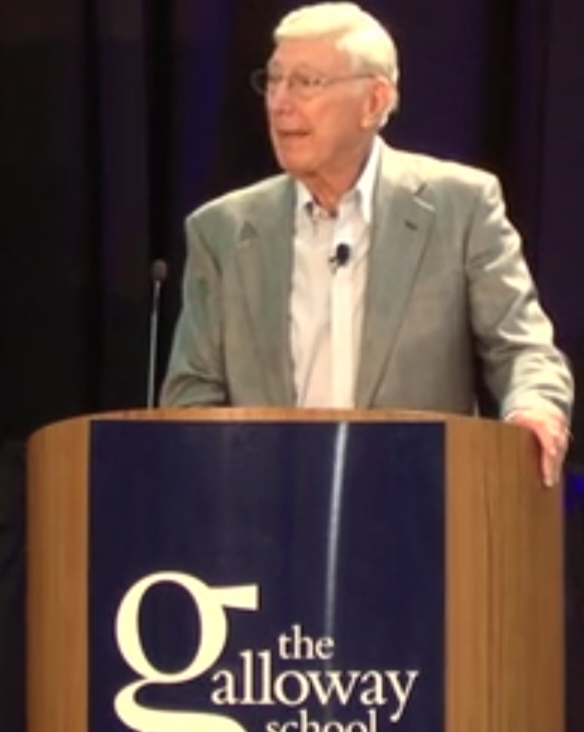
Marcus giving a speech as part of the "Speaker Series" at The Galloway School in Atlanta, October 2016

Marcus was a longtime philanthropist who made plans to give away 90% of his $5.9 billion fortune to charity. Bernie and Billi Marcus were signatories of The Giving Pledge, a commitment to give away the majority of their wealth to philanthropic causes.

By 2019, Bernard Marcus had given away $2 billion to various philanthropic causes and pledged to give away most of his fortune, which had doubled to $9.8 billion in 2024. The previous year, Marcus was recognized as one of the Top 10 individuals who gave or pledged the most to charity in the United States. He was one of the first signees of the Jewish Future Promise, a charitable campaign launched in 2020 modeled after The Giving Pledge to encourage American Jews to designate at least 50% of their charitable giving to Jewish or Israel-related causes.

Marcus was the chairman of the Marcus Foundation, whose focuses include children, medical research, free enterprise, military veterans, Jewish causes, and the community. Marcus was on the Board of Directors and an active volunteer for the Shepherd Center. One of his main initiatives was providing care for war veterans with traumatic brain injuries. In May 2005, Marcus was awarded the Others Award by The Salvation Army, their highest honor.

He was named a Georgia Trustee in 2009. The award is given by the Georgia Historical Society, in conjunction with the Governor of Georgia, to individuals whose accomplishments and community service reflect the ideals of the founding body of Trustees, which governed the Georgia colony from 1732 to 1752. In 2012, Marcus was awarded the William E. Simon Prize for Philanthropic Leadership.

=== Jewish and Israeli causes ===
Marcus co-founded the Israel Democracy Institute in 1991, contributing $5 million for the construction of the institute's building in Jerusalem's Talbiya neighborhood and investing hundreds of millions of shekels in its ongoing operation over the years. In 2016, Marcus and his wife Billi donated $25 million to the construction of the $133 million MDA Marcus National Blood Services Centre in Israel.

=== Georgia Aquarium ===
Bernard Marcus heavily contributed to the launch of Georgia Aquarium, which opened in downtown Atlanta in 2005 based mostly on the $250 million donation for the aquarium.

=== Medical research ===
Marcus funded and founded The Marcus Institute, a center for the provision of services for children and adolescents with developmental disabilities. Marcus founded and donated $25 million to Autism Speaks to spearhead its efforts to raise money for research on the causes and cure for autism. He was an active member of the board of directors.

== Books ==
In 1999, Marcus, along with Arthur Blank and Bob Andelman, wrote the book Built from Scratch: How a Couple of Regular Guys Grew The Home Depot from Nothing to $30 Billion. Marcus, with Catherine Lewis, wrote a book titled Kick Up Some Dust: Lessons on Thinking, Giving Back and Doing It Yourself. The book debuted at The Book Festival of the Marcus Jewish Community Center of Atlanta on November 6, 2022.

== Personal life and death ==
Marcus was married twice. He had two children with his first wife, Ruth (née Schwartz, div. 1972, died 2023): Frederick, a professor at Emory University, and Susanne (1956–2021), a musician, music manager and philanthropist. She ran her own charity, The Susanne Marcus Collins Foundation. Bernard had a stepson, Michael Morris, the owner and publisher of the Atlanta Jewish Times, from his second wife, philanthropist Billi Morris (m. 1973). He had seven grandchildren.

Marcus lived in Atlanta in 2006. He died from natural causes at his home in Boca Raton, Florida, on November 4, 2024, at age 95.

Business positions
Preceded by none	CEO of Home Depot; 1978–1997	Succeeded by Arthur Blank
