= Evaleen Jaager Roy =

Canadian businesswoman

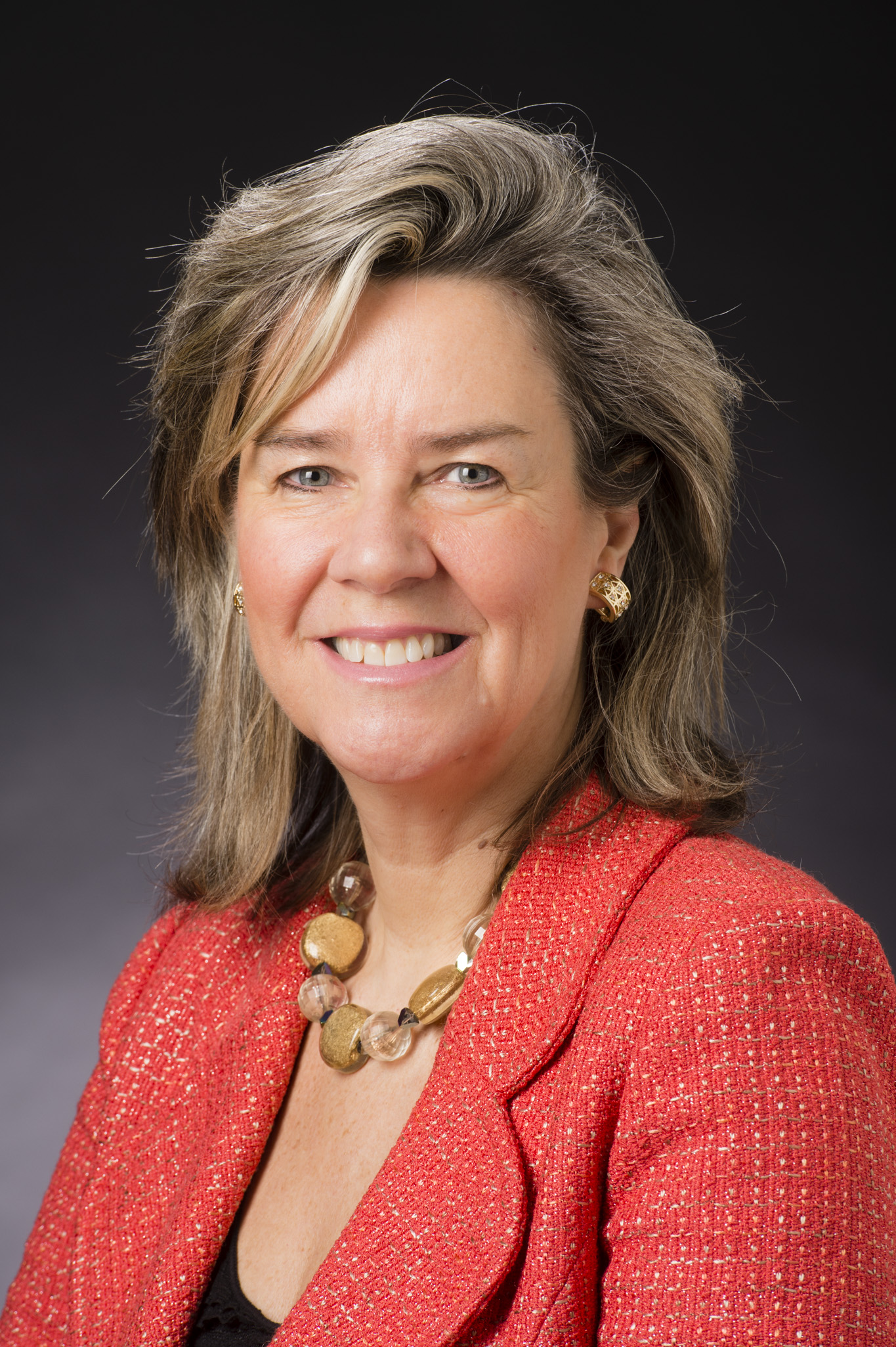
- Jaager Roy in 2015
- Education: MBA., Harvard Business School
- Known for: Principal of Jaager Roy Advisory Inc.
- Children: 1

Evaleen Jaager Roy is a Canadian businesswoman.

== Early life and education ==
Jaager Roy was born to Estonian immigrant Walter Jaager in Canada. She earned her MBA from Harvard Business School.

== Career ==
From 1983 until 1984, Jaager Roy was elected student representative of Simon Fraser University's (SFU) board. After earning her MBA from Harvard University in 1988, Roy accepted a position with General Motors and later Westcoast Transmission Co. She later became a member of SFU's advisory board faculty of business administration from 1993 to 1998. After completing an executive development program from Queen's University, Jaager Roy led Westcoast's HR group. This led her to attracting attention from Electronic Arts where she became the first HR executive hired by the company in Canada. She also became the first former SFU undergrad to be elected Chair of the SFU board of governors. As chair, she was also named to the Board of Directors of BC Lotteries. In 2002, Jaager Roy was replaced by Brandt Louie as chair of the board.

On August 20, 2008, Jaager Roy was re-elected to SFU's Foundation Board until August 19, 2011. In 2009, she was honoured with the SFU's Professional Achievement Award. By 2010, Jaager Roy left EA to begin her own advisory business, called Jaager Roy Advisory Inc. In the same year, she was also appointed Chair of the Emily Carr University of Art and Design Board of Governors. The next year, she was named one of the 2011 Influential Women in Business by Vancouver Magazine. She also published her first book "Four Chefs One Garden," which won the Surrey International Writer's Conference 2011 Griffin Award. In 2012, Jaager Roy was honoured with the Queen Elizabeth II Diamond Jubilee Medal and was named a Trudeau Foundation Mentor in 2013.

In 2014, she was appointed to sit on the Asia Pacific Foundation of Canada's Board of Directors. In 2016, Jaager Roy was the recipient of an honorary degree from SFU. As of 2017, Jaager Roy sits on the Advisory Council at SFU's Beedie School of Business Jack Austin Centre for Asia Pacific Business Studies.

== Personal life ==
Jaager Roy and her former husband, Peter Roy, have one son together.
