= London Drugs =

Canadian retail pharmacy chain

- Company type: Subsidiary
- Industry: Retail
- Founded: 1945; 81 years ago
- Founder: Sam Bass
- Headquarters: Richmond, British Columbia
- Area served: Western Canada: (Alberta; British Columbia; Manitoba; Saskatchewan)
- Key people: Brandt Louie, CEO and Chairman
- Products: Electronics, grocery, pharmaceuticals, health & beauty, photofinishing, insurance services, furniture, toys, optical, housewares, and tech services including Apple Authorized Service Provider.
- Owner: H.Y. Louie Co.
- Website: www.londondrugs.com

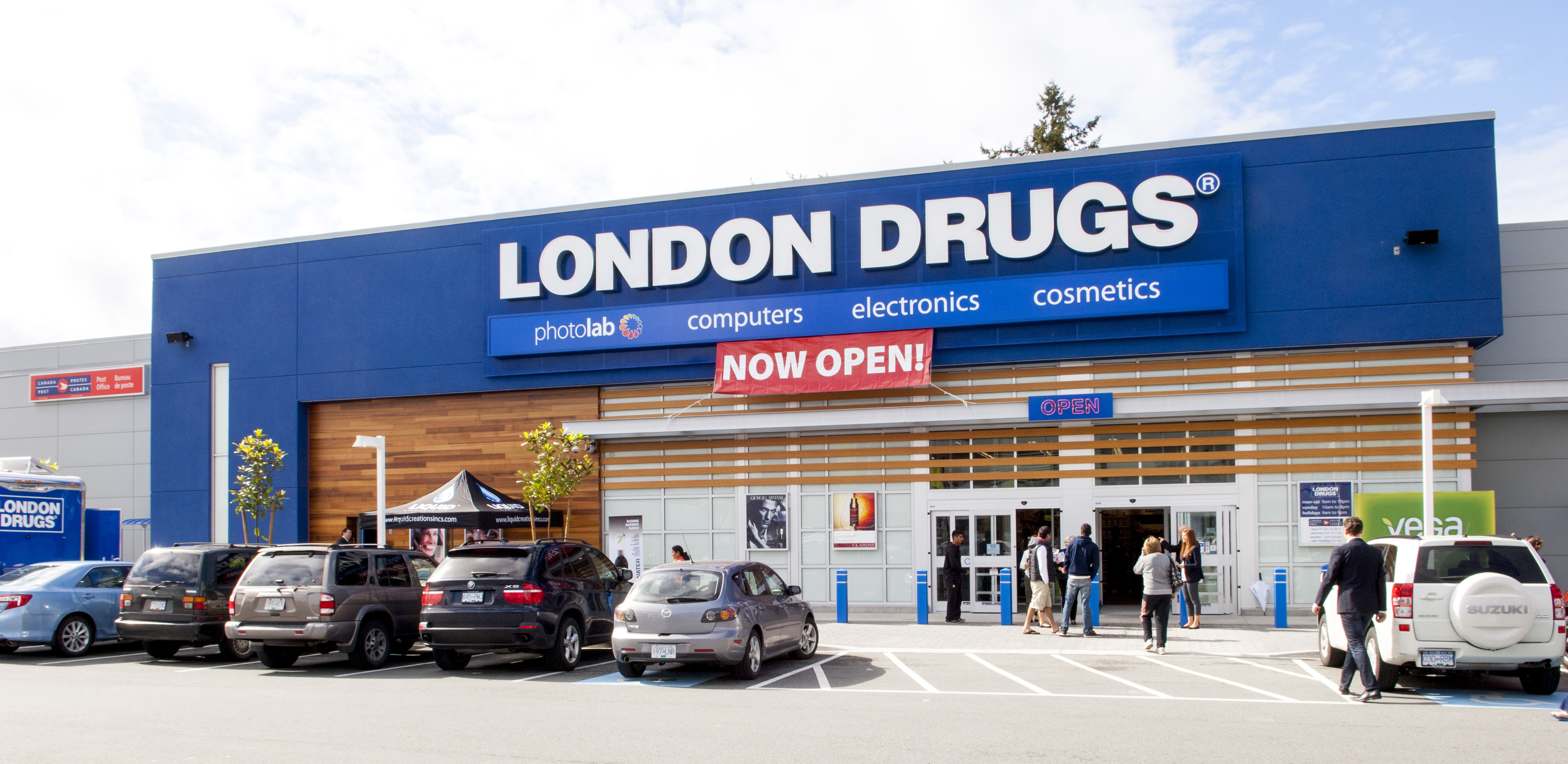
Former London Drugs Store 85 in Abbotsford, British Columbia

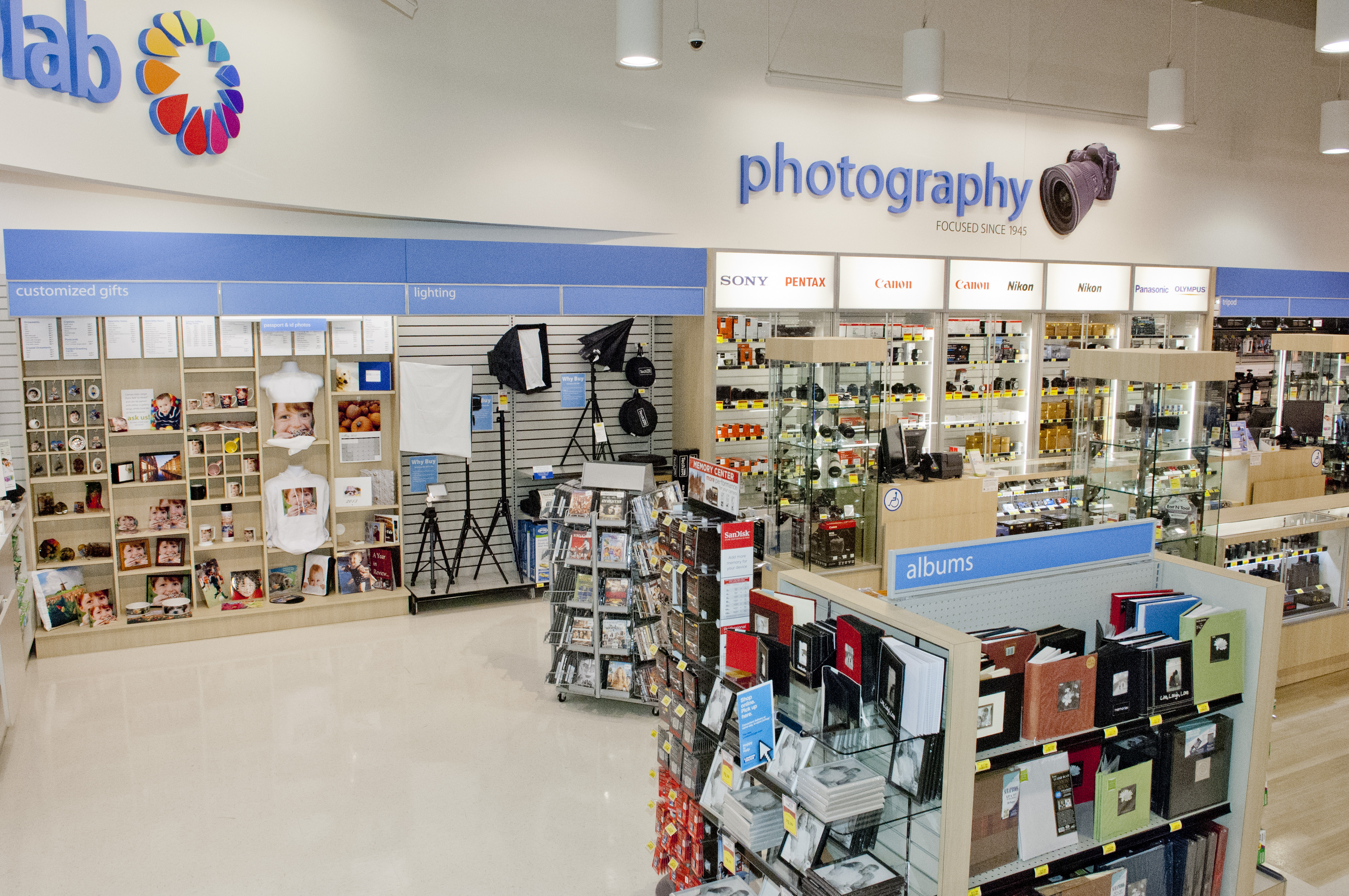
Former Photography section of London Drugs Store 85 in Abbotsford, BC

London Drugs is a Canadian retail pharmacy chain based in Richmond, British Columbia. As of February 2026, the chain has 78 stores in Western Canada. In addition to pharmacy services, London Drugs locations also sell electronics, housewares, cosmetics, and a limited selection of grocery items.

== History ==
London Drugs was founded by Sam Bass in 1945 as a small drugstore at 800 Main Street in Vancouver, British Columbia. Bass named his drugstore after the English city of London, the seat of the Canadian monarch.

In 1968, London Drugs was sold to Daylin, Inc. The next year, Daylin ran into financial difficulties in the US branch of its business, and decided to put London Drugs up for sale. In 1976, the business was acquired by the H.Y. Louie Group under the direction of President Tong Louie. Louie was son of Zhongshan born Vancouver grocer Hok Yat Louie (1875–1934).

Tong Louie expanded the company within BC and, for the first time, beyond the provincial border into Alberta with the first Edmonton location in 1976. In the next ten years, London Drugs tripled its number of stores.

During this growth, the company also began increasing the types of products available in stores. Small kitchen appliances, high end cosmetics and high quality photo equipment quickly became staple items lining the shelves.

In 1981, London Drugs expanded into another non-traditional drugstore category by installing its first One-Hour Photofinishing labs. The introduction of photofinishing labs into the store and the one-hour-photo revolution paved the way for London Drugs' introduction of a computer department in 1983.

In 2004, the St. Vital Shopping Centre in Winnipeg became the new home to London Drugs' first Manitoba store.

Today, London Drugs has stores in more than 35 major markets throughout British Columbia, Alberta, Saskatchewan, and Manitoba. According to their website, as of September 2019, they operate 82 stores. In addition to pharmacy, other major goods offered include cosmetics, small appliances, electronics, cameras and photo finishing, toys and food. London Drugs serves more than 45 million customers each year.

In January 2019, London Drugs acquired the Edmonton-based photography chain McBain Camera.

From April 28–May 7, 2024, all London Drugs stores were closed due to a ransomware attack on the company's head offices. Critical data infrastructure was rebuilt and audited. Urgent pharmacy care remained available during the closures. On May 21, 2024, the cybercriminal gang LockBit claimed responsibility for the attack, and threatened to release data within 48 hours if a ransom of $25 million was not paid. London Drugs stated that they were "unwilling and unable to pay ransom" to the parties involved. No customer or primary employee data was compromised. On May 23, 2024, the company confirmed that data had been leaked by the hackers, and that affected employees were being offered identity theft protection services.

== Brands ==
London Drugs markets its own brand of products and services under the following labels:

Name	Type of Product
Collection by London Drugs	Furniture, Homeware, Food, Beauty Accessories, Jewellery
Wellness by London Drugs	Vitamins and Medicines
Today by London Drugs	Food, Household Consumables, Pet Supplies
Certified Data	Computers
Trusted by London Drugs	Computer and Electronic Accessories
Eco Essentials by London Drugs	Eco friendly wellness and beauty products
London Plantation	Nuts
LD Insurance	Insurance Services
London Spa	Spa Services
CustomWorks	Entertainment System Installation
TLD Computers	IT Equipment and Services

== Locations ==
Of the chain's 78 stores, 50 are located in British Columbia, 34 of which are located in the Lower Mainland. There are also 21 stores in Alberta, 5 in Saskatchewan, and 2 in Manitoba.
