= Arthur Blank =

American businessman and sports team owner (born 1942)

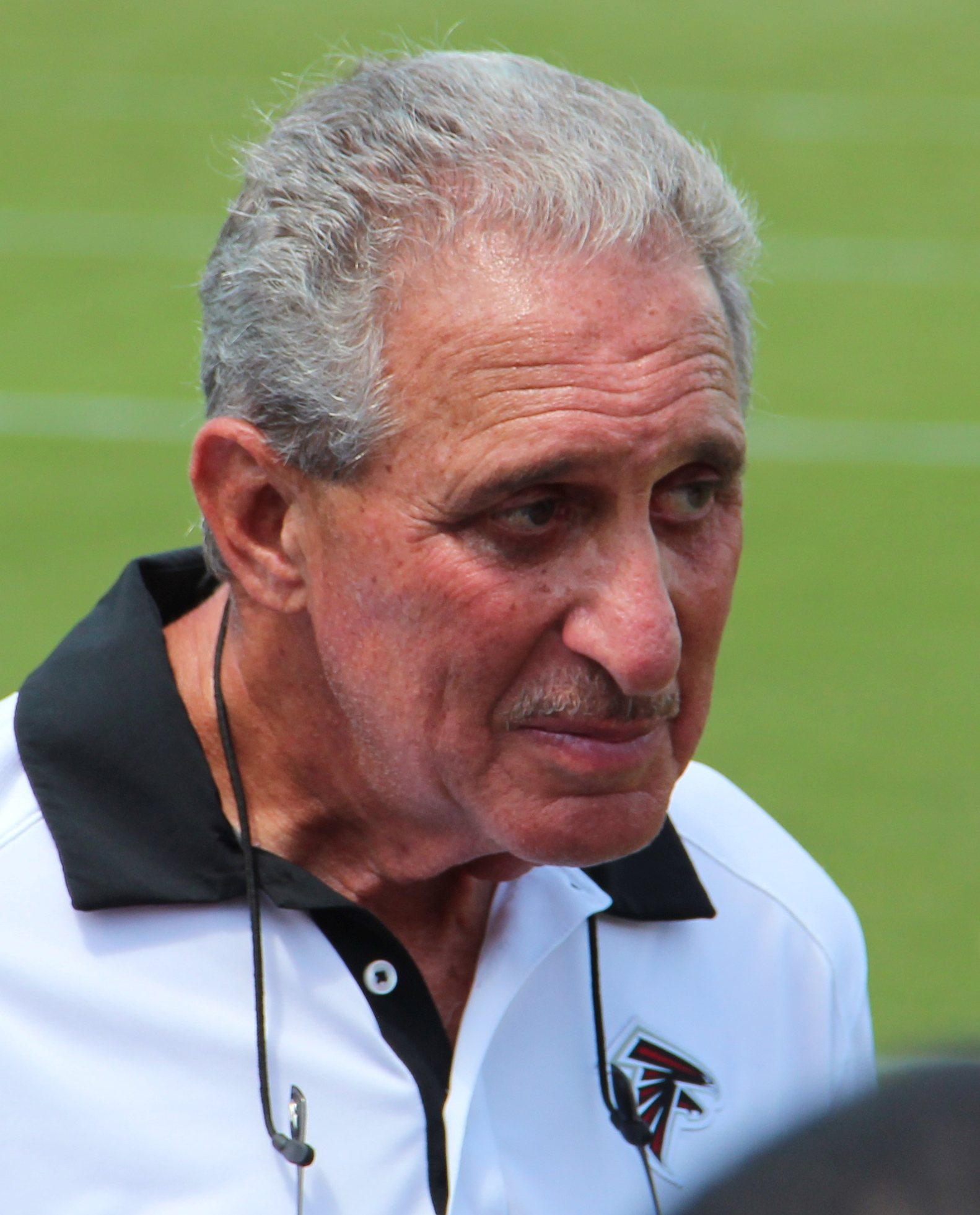
- Blank in 2016
- Born: Arthur Morris Blank; September 27, 1942 (age 84); Queens, New York City, U.S.
- Education: Babson College (BSBA)
- Occupations: Home Depot co-founder; Atlanta Falcons owner; Atlanta Drive GC owner; Atlanta United FC owner; philanthropist
- Spouses: Diana Latow (divorced 1993); Stephanie Wray (m. 1995; div. 2014) Angela Macuga (m. 2016; div. 2019)
- Children: 6
- Website: www.blankfamilyofbusinesses.com

Arthur Morris Blank (born September 27, 1942) is an American businessman who co-founded the home improvement retailer The Home Depot. Blank owns four professional sports teams based in Atlanta, Georgia: the Atlanta Falcons of the National Football League (NFL); Atlanta Drive GC of golf league TGL, which won the SoFi Cup in 2025; Atlanta United FC of Major League Soccer (MLS), which won the 2018 MLS Cup; and Atlanta City FC of the National Women's Soccer League (NWSL). Blank is chairman of the teams' parent company, AMB Group LLC.

== Life ==
Arthur Blank was born in Flushing, Queens, New York. He was born to Jewish parents, Max Blank, a pharmacist, and Molly Blank. He has an older brother named Michael Blank. Blank graduated from Stuyvesant High School in New York City.

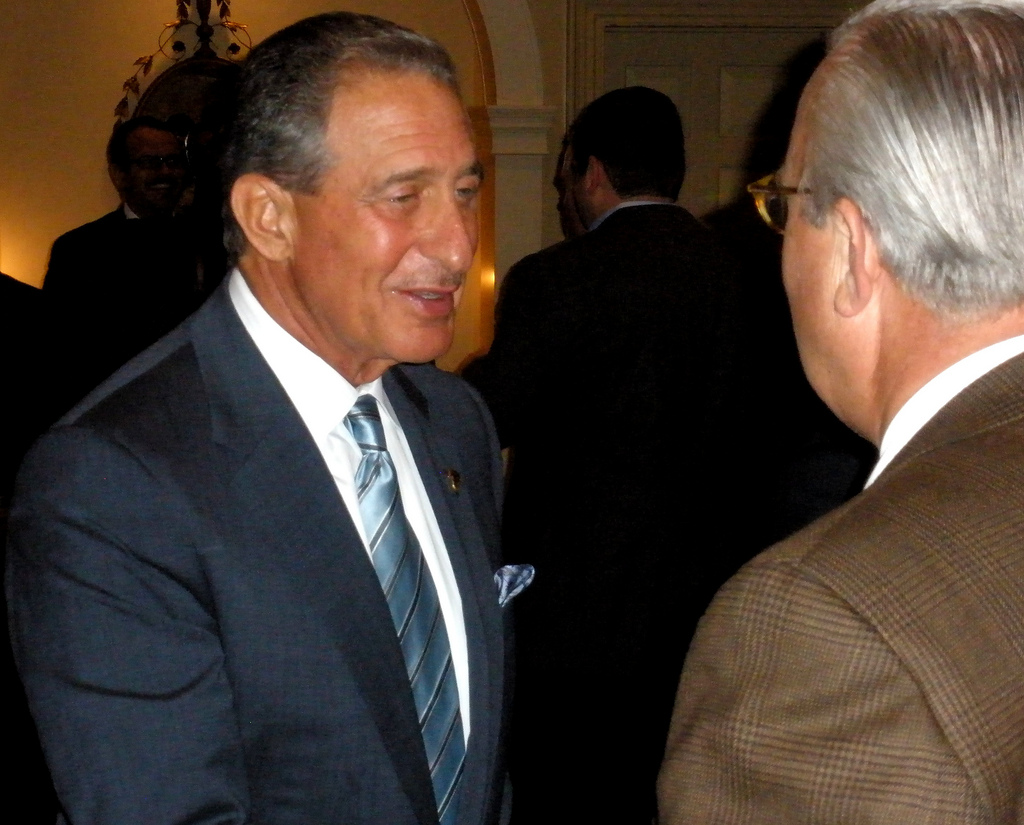
Blank in 2009

After graduating from Babson Institute in 1963, Blank was hired by Arthur Young and Company, where he was a senior accountant. He later joined the Daylin corporation, where he rose to become president of Elliott's Drug Stores/Stripe Discount Stores, a division of Daylin. When Daylin decided to sell off that division, Blank moved to another division, Handy Dan Home Improvement Centers. Bernard Marcus was CEO of Handy Dan and Blank was vice president of finance when both were fired in 1978, as part of an internal power struggle.

In 1978, Blank co-founded Home Depot with Marcus. New York investment banker Ken Langone assembled the initial group of investors and merchandising expert Patrick Farrah helped founders realize their vision of one-stop shopping for the do-it-yourselfer. The first two stores opened on June 22, 1979 in Atlanta. The stores revolutionized the home improvement business with its warehouse concept and Blank and Marcus became billionaires as a result. Blank spent 19 years as the company's president before succeeding Marcus as CEO. Blank retired from the company in 2001 as co-chairman.

On May 22, 2024, Blank won the Sports Business Journal's Lifetime Achievement Award for his work with the Falcons, United FC, and the surrounding community. On June 24, 2026, Blank received the Golden Plate Award of the American Academy of Achievement presented by Awards Council member John W. Henry at a ceremony in Washington, D.C.

== Sports ownership ==
In February 2002, Blank purchased the Atlanta Falcons franchise in the National Football League from owner Taylor Smith, the son of team founder Rankin M. Smith Sr. In September 2004, he bought the Arena Football League franchise, the Georgia Force; he moved the team to the city of Atlanta after it had spent several years in suburban Gwinnett County. In 2023, Blank purchased Atlanta Drive GC of TGL.

Blank has expressed serious interest in purchasing other sports franchises. In early 2006, he temporarily withdrew from contention as a potential buyer of the Atlanta Braves of Major League Baseball. Some months later, Blank re-entered serious talks with Time Warner and a report indicated that a sale was imminent. However, in February 2007, the Braves completed the sale of the team to Liberty Media. Blank has also founded an expansion Major League Soccer franchise named Atlanta United FC that began play in 2017. The club shares Mercedes-Benz Stadium with the Falcons. Blank also helped the United States Soccer Federation set up their new headquarters in Atlanta, and the new training center was named in his honor. Blank also received an expansion team that would become Atlanta City FC of the National Women's Soccer League that will begin play in 2028.

== Philanthropy ==
Blank is chairman of The Arthur Blank Family Foundation, and serves on the Board of Trustees of Emory University.

In March 2020, Blank's foundation announced it would donate nearly $5.4 million to aid the coronavirus pandemic response in Georgia and Montana.

In October 2020, the Arthur M. Blank Foundation awarded a $20 million legacy grant to establish the Arthur M. Blank Center for Stuttering Education and Research at the University of Texas at Austin.

In October 2020, it was announced that the new Children's Healthcare of Atlanta hospital would be named after Arthur Blank after his foundation donated $200 million to the project. The Arthur M. Blank Hospital opened on September 29, 2024.

In February 2026, the foundation announced a $75 million commitment to Blue Meridian Partners, a philanthropic group that invests in anti-poverty initiatives.

He is a signatory of The Giving Pledge, committing himself to give away at least 50% of his wealth to charitable causes.

== Personal life ==
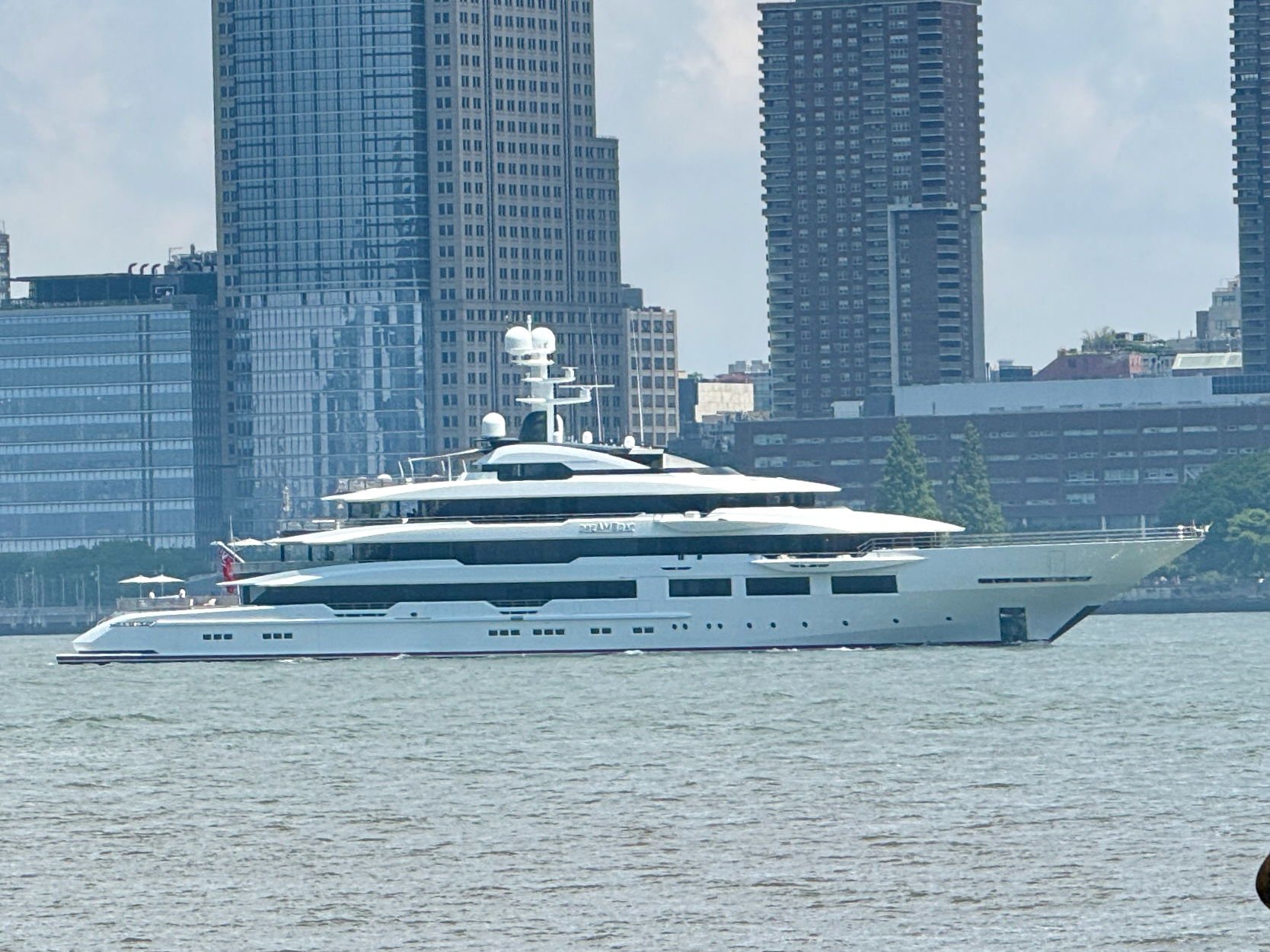
DreAMBoat

Blank has been married and divorced three times. He has three children with his first wife, Diana Blank. They divorced in 1993. In 1995, he married Stephanie V. Blank (born 1968), a Blowing Rock, North Carolina native and Appalachian State University graduate. They met when she worked as a designer at a Home Depot store in Atlanta. They had three children before being divorced. In June 2016, Blank married Angela Macuga (born 1968), who had three children from a previous marriage. They announced their pending divorce on January 1, 2019.

Blank owns Mountain Sky Guest Ranch and West Creek Ranch outside Yellowstone National Park in Paradise Valley, Montana. He also owns a 90-meter (300 ft), $180 million superyacht named with Blank's initials, dreAMBoat, as well as several PGA TOUR Superstores.

On February 9, 2016, Blank disclosed that he had treatable prostate cancer. On March 17, 2016, Blank announced that he was cancer-free following treatment.

Business positions
Preceded by Bernard Marcus	CEO of Home Depot; 1997–2000	Succeeded by Robert Nardelli
