= Joseph Semprevivo =

American businessman

Joseph Semprevivo is an American business executive who founded Joseph's Lite Cookies, an international food product company. He is also the author of Madness, Miracles, Millions, the story of his family's success.

Semprevivo has appeared on Fox News and Fox Business to discuss tax policy. He is also a regular op-ed columnist and his writings have appeared in the Wall Street Journal and the Washington Examiner. In March 2019, Semprevivo testified before the U.S. Congress about social security.

Joseph Semprevivo is a member of the Job Creators Network.

== Personal life ==
Semprevivo is the son of Lawrence and Jo-Marie Semprevivo. Before he was born, Semprevivo's father nearly lost his arm in a printing press machine accident, which disabled him and impoverished the family. At age nine, Semprevivo was diagnosed with Type 1 diabetes. This disease eventually inspired him to launch Joseph's Lite Cookies.

At age 17, Semprevivo was presented the American Success Award by President George H. W. Bush in a White House ceremony. Semprevivo graduated first in his class at Florida International University, receiving The Directors Award, The Best Student Award and The Leadership Award.

Semprevivo was appointed by Governor Richardson and Governor Martinez to be Economic Development Commissioner for the State of New Mexico. He served in the role for 12 years.

In 2004, Joseph's Lite Cookies received the New Mexico Governor's VIVA (Vision, Investment, Vitality, Action) Award as well as the American Tasting Institute Award, Quality Hero Award, and the Superior Product Award. That same year, Semprevivo was awarded the Best Executive award from the Stevie Awards.

In 2013, Semprevivo and his father published Madness, Miracles, Millions. He is married with eight children.

== Education and professional life ==
Semprevivo received a Bachelors of Business Administration from New Mexico State University, as well as a Masters of Science in International Real Estate from Florida International University. On top of his cookie business, Semprevivo is also a professor of finance, real estate, and insurance at Indian River State College.

== Joseph's Lite Cookies ==
Joseph's Lite Cookies bakes more than 12 million sugar-free cookies a day. The company also produces sugar-free pancake syrup and other food products. The cookies became a regularly scheduled item on QVC for six consecutive years. His first day on air, Semprevivo sold 3.6 million cookies.

== Awards ==
Semprevivo has won several awards for Madness, Miracles, Millions, including:

- Illumination Award-Bronze Medal, Inspirational
- Axiom Award-Bronze, Corporate History/Milestone
- International Book Award-Finalist, Entrepreneurship
- International Book Award-Winner, Young Adult
- National Indie Excellence Award-Finalist, 2015
- Next Generation Indie Book Award-Finalist, Motivational
- Next Generation Indie Book Award-Finalist, Career
