= Handy Dan =

American hardware store chain

Handy Dan Home Improvement was an American home improvement store founded by Amnon Barnes. It went out of business in May 1989.

By 1972, the company operated 30 stores in California, Texas, Arizona, Nebraska and Oklahoma. It made an initial offering in November, which led to Daylin, Inc. owning 81% of Handy Dan. Daylin filed for bankruptcy in February 1975, though its subsidiaries were not included in the Chapter 11 proceedings. Handy Dan was one of the few assets the company didn't sell during this time.

Bernard Marcus was CEO of Handy Dan in 1978 when he was fired along with company vice president Arthur Blank amid a corporate power struggle with Daylin CEO Sanford C. Sigoloff. Marcus and Blank went on to found Home Depot.

Daylin was purchased by W. R. Grace and Company in 1979. In 1986, Grace's retail home improvement division, which included Handy Dan and Channel Home Centers, was sold to the division's executives through a leveraged buyout.

Handy Dan played a major role in getting Texas' religion-based blue laws repealed in 1984 due to them opening on Sunday and using white price stickers for goods that could be sold seven days a week, and blue price stickers for items that could not be sold on Sunday.
