= Pat Farrah =

American former retail executive

Patrick Farrah is an American former retail executive who is a co-founder of Home Depot.

Patrick Farrah was born and raised in Southern California. Dropping out of junior college in the first year, in 1962 he took a job at National Lumber and Supply Company in the Los Angeles Area. As the company grew into a small chain, he worked his way up from stock boy to executive vice president and general manager of National Lumber and Supply. In 1977, following a disagreement with the owners, he left the company.

With a background in merchandising, Farrah in 1978 started his own big box home improvement retailer called Homeco. At the time, Bernard Marcus and Arthur Blank wanted to start a company that eventually became Home Depot. On seeing Homeco, Marcus realized that Farrah shared the same vision he had for a big box retailer. Marcus and Blank looked into buying Homeco, but the business had financing issues. When Homeco went out of business, they hired Farrah to help them launch Home Depot. He was offered a position as chief merchandising officer. In the early 1990s, Farrah left Home Depot to pursue his own interests. He rejoined in 1996 and retired in the early 2000s.

At the first global DIY Summit held in Brussels, Belgium, on June 9, 2011, Farrah was awarded the first Global DIY Lifetime Award, presented by the European DIY Retail Association (EDRA), the European Federation of DIY Manufacturers (fediyma) and the Global Home Improvement Network.
