= Channel Home Centers =

American home improvement store chain

- Industry: Retail, Home improvement
- Founded: 1948 (first retail location)
- Defunct: 1994
- Fate: Merged with Rickel
- Headquarters: Whippany, New Jersey
- Key people: Louis L. Slater (Chain founder); Morris Charin (Levy's partner); Abraham Levy (Founder of preceding lumber company)
- Parent: Family owned through 1977; W. R. Grace and Company (1977-86)

Channel Home Centers (formerly known as Channel Lumber Company and often simply known as Channel) was a chain of home-improvement centers that was based in Whippany, New Jersey.

== History ==
A 1975 New York Times profile traced the company's origins to a lumber business started in Newark in 1922 by two Russian Jewish Americans, Abraham Levy and Morris Charin (1887–1963). A 1990 article in the same publication, and other company releases, however, have put the founding date at 1908. Louis L. Slater (1913–1987), son-in-law of Levy, opened the first retail outlet in Newark, New Jersey in 1948.

== Expansion ==
In 1963, it was reported that Channel Lumber had seven locations, all in New Jersey.

By late 1975, the chain had 24 locations, 22 of which were in New Jersey. W. R. Grace and Company purchased the company from the Slater family in 1977 for $19 million. By 1979, the company had expanded to over 70 locations, moving beyond New Jersey and Pennsylvania to enter New York, Connecticut, and Delaware in 1978, and Maryland and Massachusetts in 1979.

In 1986, Channel's executives bought the company through a leveraged buyout. The purchase included a total of 202 retail locations in 20 states, including home centers under W.R. Grace located in the southeast, among them "Handy City" and Handy Dan.

== Bankruptcy ==
By 1990, the chain had grown to 89 Channel outlets in nine states, but in early 1991, the company filed for Chapter 11 bankruptcy protection, and announced a plan to close 34 of 86 stores, mostly in the Baltimore-Washington and New England markets. It emerged from bankruptcy in March 1992.

In 1994, Channel and its competitor Rickel were bought by a venture capital firm, which merged the operations of the two chains under the Rickel name. At that point in time, it had 60 locations, and its 1993 sales topped $300 million. Fifty-nine of Channel's sixty stores were rebranded; the only one that was not was its location in Totowa, New Jersey as Rickel already had a store in the vicinity.

== See also ==
- Builders Square
