= Marcus Foundation =

Group of non-profit foundations

The Marcus Foundation is a philanthropic organization aimed at improving the cure rates of childhood brain tumors through direct funding of organized clinical research.

== History ==
The Marcus Foundation was established by Bernie Marcus, co-founder of The Home Depot, and his wife, Billi Marcus, in 1989. In addition to childhood brain tumor research and treatment efforts, he foundation also supports other areas of research related to the brain.

In 2025, the foundation gave $30 million to the University of Michigan and Stanford University for work related to stroke patients.

== Operations ==
The Marcus Foundation refers to three different foundations: the Marcus Niziak Childhood Brain Tumor Fund, the Grace R. and Alan D. Marcus Foundation, and the Marcus Foundation.
