= Flag of Atlanta =

Atlanta
- Proportion: 2:3
- Design: Solid blue with the seal of Atlanta in the center.

The city flag of Atlanta consists of a blue background with the seal of Atlanta in the center; the seal consists of only the colors blue and gold. The seal depicts a phoenix rising from a fire with text surrounding it; the phoenix is used to represent Atlanta rising from ashes after the American Civil War. The text surrounding the phoenix reads "1865", "1847", "Atlanta GA", and "resurgens" (all of which are in all caps). The word resurgens is Latin for 'rising again'; the word is also used as a motto for the city of Atlanta. The date the flag was adopted is unknown, as well as the creator of the flag.

== See also ==
- Flag of Georgia (U.S. state)
