= Foodtown (United States) =

American supermarket chain

- Company type: Supermarket cooperative
- Founded: 1955
- Headquarters: Iselin, New Jersey, United States
- Number of locations: 66
- Products: Bakery, dairy, deli, frozen foods, grocery, meat, pharmacy, produce, seafood, snacks, liquor
- Parent: Allegiance Retail Services
- Website: Foodtown.com

Foodtown is a northeastern United States supermarket cooperative founded in 1955 by Twin County Grocers in New Jersey. Currently, there are 66 Foodtown stores in New Jersey, New York, and Connecticut. Foodtown's corporate offices are located in Iselin, New Jersey.

Much like other retailers cooperatives, such as ShopRite, each Foodtown is independently owned and operated, with some owners operating multiple stores. Foodtown's parent company, Allegiance Retail Services, also supplies Foodtown-branded items and acts as a supplier for other independent grocers that do not operate under the Foodtown banner.

== History ==
In the 1980s and 1990s, Foodtown was a major grocer on Long Island and in New Jersey. In 1994, Foodtown's parent company, Twin County Grocers, was headed by Martin Vitale and was supplying 165 Foodtown stores, resulting in a wholesale revenue of over $1 billion. Mayfair Supermarkets and Melmarkets operated 45 of those stores, and combined were the cooperative's two largest owners.

In the mid-1990s, two major incidents nearly resulted in the demise of the Foodtown cooperative. The first incident came in 1995, when the Dutch retailer Ahold purchased all forty-five of the Foodtown stores operated by Melmarkets and Mayfair Supermarkets. Shortly following the purchase, those stores were converted to Ahold's Edwards Super Food Stores banner. As these stores made up nearly half of Twin County Grocers' volume, the cooperative took a severe financial hit. The second incident came when, in the chaos resulting from the Ahold purchase, a scandal was uncovered where members of Twin County's corporate hierarchy were found to have been embezzling money from the cooperative.

In 1998, the lost volume from the Ahold acquisition and damage from the embezzlement scandal forced Foodtown's parent, Twin County Grocers, into bankruptcy. Following these events, many Foodtown stores converted to other banners or simply closed.

The Twin County CEO, Martin Vitale, eventually pleaded guilty to stealing $4.2 million from the cooperative, as well as bribing a leader in the United Food and Commercial Workers union in New Jersey. In 2004, Foodtown closed its supply warehouse.

In 2006, a Foodtown franchisee purchased several Winn-Dixie locations in south-east Florida from a bankruptcy auction. Of those, two locations (West Palm Beach and Davie) were branded as Foodtown, although they do not appear on the Foodtown website.

In 2012, various independent grocer cooperatives came together to form Allegiance Retail Services, with the Foodtown cooperative being the largest founding member. Allegiance is responsible for advertising, marketing programs, technological services, and negotiating with suppliers on behalf of its members. It is also responsible for producing various products under the Foodtown brand name, which are provided to all of the different members in the cooperative.

On February 10, 2016, it was announced that Allegiance Retail Services had purchased the intellectual property of former A&P division Pathmark through a bankruptcy auction. The sale included the Pathmark logo, trademarks, brand names, pathmark.com domain, and all other intellectual property associated with the Pathmark name. Since then, Allegiance has reopened the Pathmark chain with a single location in Brooklyn, New York.

On October 16, 2018, the Foodtown location in Denville, New Jersey, closed its doors. The owners of the store, the Dickerson family, had operated a market at that location since 1883 and had been members of the Foodtown cooperative for over fifty years.
