= Pathmark =

Supermarket chain owned by Allegiance Retail Services

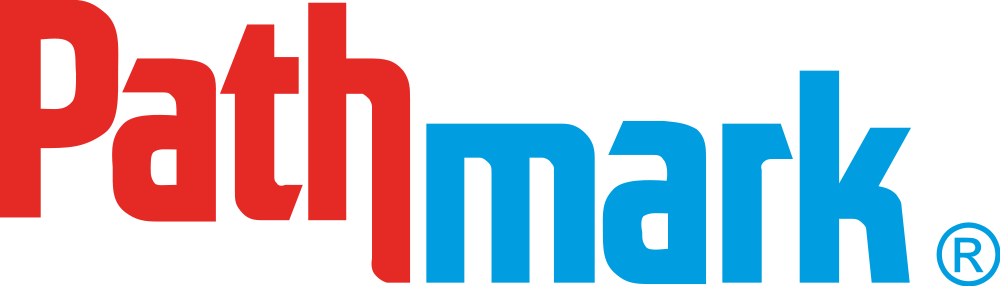
- Type: Subsidiary
- Industry: Grocery
- Founded: 1968; 58 years ago in Woodbridge, New Jersey, U.S.
- Fate: Bankruptcy (original)
- Headquarters: Iselin, New Jersey, U.S.
- Number of locations: 2 (as of July 24th, 2026)
- Area served: Northeastern United States
- Products: Bakery; Grocery; Florist; Deli; Produce; Seafood; Meats; Dairy; Pharmacy; General merchandise
- Brands: Pathmark (1968–2008); No Frills (1978–1997); Smart Price (1997–2010); Chefmark (1975–2008, 2014–2015); America's Choice (2008–2015); Best Yet (2019–present)
- Services: Bakery, deli, banking, groceries
- Parent: Supermarkets General Corp. (1968–1993); Supermarkets General Holdings Corp/ d/b/a Pathmark Stores, Inc. (1993–2007); The Great Atlantic & Pacific Tea Co. (2007–2016); Allegiance Retail Services (2016–present)
- Website: pathmark.com

Pathmark is a supermarket brand owned by Allegiance Retail Services, a retailers’ cooperative based in Iselin, New Jersey, United States. Pathmark currently has two locations, one in East Flatbush, Brooklyn, New York, which it has operated since 2019, and one in East Meadow, New York, operated since 2026.

From 1968 until 2015, Pathmark operated a chain of supermarkets throughout the northeastern United States. The chain was founded by Supermarkets General, which previously operated ShopRite stores as a member of the Wakefern cooperative and chose to go into business for itself as a direct competitor. The company would eventually take the Pathmark name and would later be purchased by competing supermarket chain A&P in 2007.

Before its initial closure, Pathmark previously operated stores in New York, New Jersey, Connecticut, Pennsylvania, Delaware, and Maryland. In 2007, Supermarket News ranked Pathmark No. 31 in its annual "Top 75 North American Food Retailers" based on Pathmark's 2006 estimated sales of $4.1 billion (~$6.12 billion in 2024). Based on 2005 revenue, Pathmark was the 67th largest retailer in the United States.

Pathmark was well known for its radio and television commercials starring character actor James Karen, who was the chain's spokesperson for more than 20 years. Pathmark's original spokesperson was Arlene Francis, who appeared in its commercials beginning almost immediately after Pathmark left the ShopRite cooperative. Peter "Produce Pete" Napolitano had starred in many of the company's commercials from 2001 until 2009.

After A&P filed for Chapter 11 bankruptcy in 2015, Pathmark's remaining stores were liquidated and closed. In 2016, Allegiance Retail Services purchased the Pathmark name and all intellectual property with the intention of reviving the well-known brand. The brand's first new location opened in Brooklyn, New York on April 12, 2019. On May 1, 2026, a Super Foodtown store was converted to the brand's first Pathmark Daily location, a smaller format grocery store.

== History ==
=== Supermarkets General and Pathmark ===
Pathmark was formed out of the Wakefern Food Corporation, parent company of ShopRite. Wakefern was both a wholesale operation and a retail operation; among its members was a subgroup, Supermarkets Operating Co., in Union, New Jersey, formed in 1956 by Alex Aidekman, Herb Brody, and Milt Perlmutter. This company operated ShopRite stores; in 1963 it branched into non-food retail by acquiring Crown Drugs.

In 1966, Supermarkets Operating Co. and General Super Markets (another subgroup within Wakefern) merged to become Supermarkets General Corporation, with Perlmutter as president. At this time, Supermarkets General operated 75 ShopRite stores across Connecticut, Delaware, Maryland, New Jersey, New York, and Pennsylvania, with annual sales of about $420 million (~$3.09 billion in 2024). Supermarkets General achieved high volume by opening large stores in densely populated areas and keeping prices low on both nationally branded-goods and private-label items.

In an attempt to diversify, Supermarkets General bought Genung's Inc., a White Plains retailer that operated the Howland's and Steinbach department stores in 1967. It also acquired the New Jersey–based Rickel home centers in 1968 and Hochschild Kohn stores of the Baltimore area in 1969.

In 1968, Supermarkets General left the Wakefern cooperative, renaming its ShopRite stores Pathmark. Pathmark's stores included not only supermarkets (33 of which had a drug department with a pharmacy) but 11 freestanding drugstores and 11 gasoline stations.

Pathmark's 81 supermarkets were accounting for about 85 percent of Supermarkets General's sales and 80 percent of its earnings in 1969.

=== 1970s ===
The number of Pathmark supermarkets had reached 91 in October 1971, with 38 others either a gas station or a drugstore. In May 1972, many Pathmark locations began operating 24 hours a day. It was the first New York-area supermarket chain to have stores with overnight hours. By February 1973, 90 of the company's 99 stores were open around the clock. That year, Pathmark instituted a price freeze on hundreds of products to help combat rising costs.

In September 1974, Pathmark introduced the use of computer scanners at checkout counters in its Middlesex Mall location. At this time, the company operated 104 Pathmark stores. By this time, Pathmark's profit margins had slipped to as low as 0.18 percent.

In 1977, after relative stagnation, Pathmark opened its first 50,000-square-foot (4,600 m2) Super Center in Jericho on Long Island. These larger, discount grocery stores also offered health and beauty products, small appliances, and videotape rentals. Also in 1977, Pathmark started a joint venture with the Bedford-Stuyvesant Restoration Corporation to bring a community grocery store to the Bed-Stuy section of Brooklyn. It proved to be one of the company's most successful stores.

Perlmutter died in 1978 and was succeeded by Louis Lowenstein as chief executive officer of Supermarkets General. After about a year, Lowenstein was removed and replaced by vice chairman Herb Brody in 1979.

=== 1980s ===
In February 1982, Leonard Lieberman was named president and chief operating officer of the Supermarkets General Corporation and Herbert Brody became vice chairman and chief executive officer. That month, the company agreed to acquire Pantry Pride, which operated 150 supermarkets in Florida, Georgia, and Virginia. However, the deal fell through by April when shareholders sued to stop the sale.

Pathmark sales reached $2.8 billion (~$7.68 billion in 2024) in 1982, when it was the nation's 10th-largest supermarket chain. In 1983, Pathmark opened its first Manhattan superstore, a 42,600-square-foot (3,960 m2) unit, in Pike Slip, near Chinatown. At this time over 100 Pathmark locations included pharmacy departments and 27 had Barnes & Noble bookstore departments. Pathmark continued to dominate Supermarkets General's sales and operating profits, accounting for 87% of sales and 83% of operating profit, respectively.

In January 1984, 7,000 butchers and delicatessen clerks at 336 Pathmark, ShopRite, Grand Union, and Foodtown supermarkets in New Jersey and New York voted to go on strike during contract negotiations. A tentative agreement was able to be reached after a 26-day strike. In July the company announced the acquisition of Purity Supreme, including 28 supermarkets and 14 Heartland warehouse stores. The chain was still No. 1 in the New York metropolitan area in 1985, with a 12.5 percent sales share.

In order to foil a takeover bid by Dart Group Corp., Supermarkets General agreed to be acquired by Merrill Lynch Capital Markets Inc. and its own senior managers for $1.58 billion in April 1987. Pathmark president Kenneth Peskin replaced Leonard Lieberman as chairman and chief executive officer. To help pay down related debt, the company sold 25 of its Heartland and Pharmacity drug stores in New Hampshire and Massachusetts to the Melville Corporation, which operated CVS at the time.

Although corporate sales reached $6 billion (~$13.2 billion in 2024) in fiscal 1989 (which ended January 28, 1989), the 51-unit Rickel subsidiary was performing poorly, while Pathmark, now with 142 stores, had slipped to third place in the New York area. Many Pathmark units had become "unkempt, dirty, and outmoded" stocked with "scores of the dreary no-frills offerings customers have shunned for years." Merrill Lynch fired Chief Executive Kenneth Peskin, replacing him with Jack Futterman.

In November 1989, Robert E. Wunderle, the company's chief economist and vice president of public affairs, was found shot to death in a Rockaway drainage ditch. Police theorized it was a mob hit related to Wunderle's role with union negotiations, but the case was never solved.

=== 1990s ===
By 1991, Pathmark had 146 supermarkets and 32 drugstores. In April, Supermarkets General announced it would be spending $385 million over the next three years to expand its Pathmark supermarket division. In July, Purity Supreme was sold off. The company introduced its new concept, Pathmark 2000, in 1992. These stores were up to 64,000 square feet and included produce, seafood, baked goods, flowers, health and beauty products, video rentals, film processing, and UPS delivery; and restrooms with tables for changing diapers.

In March 1993, Supermarkets General announced it was planning to take the company public, though this was later cancelled. It also spun off Rickel Home Centers and sold it a year later. It also split off its distribution and transportation business. That October, in a corporate reorganization, Supermarkets General Corp., a subsidiary of Supermarkets General Holdings Corp., changed its name to Pathmark Stores, Inc.

In 1994, Pathmark added to its private-label products, introducing Pathmark Preferred, an upscale line to match its mid-tier Pathmark and generic No Frills brands. Pathmark's over 3,300 private-label items were accounting for about 24 percent of its sales. On April 30, 1994, Pathmark opened its third Super Drug discount store in Connecticut. In November, the company closed seven stores in Pennsylvania after union workers rejected a proposal to cut employee salaries.

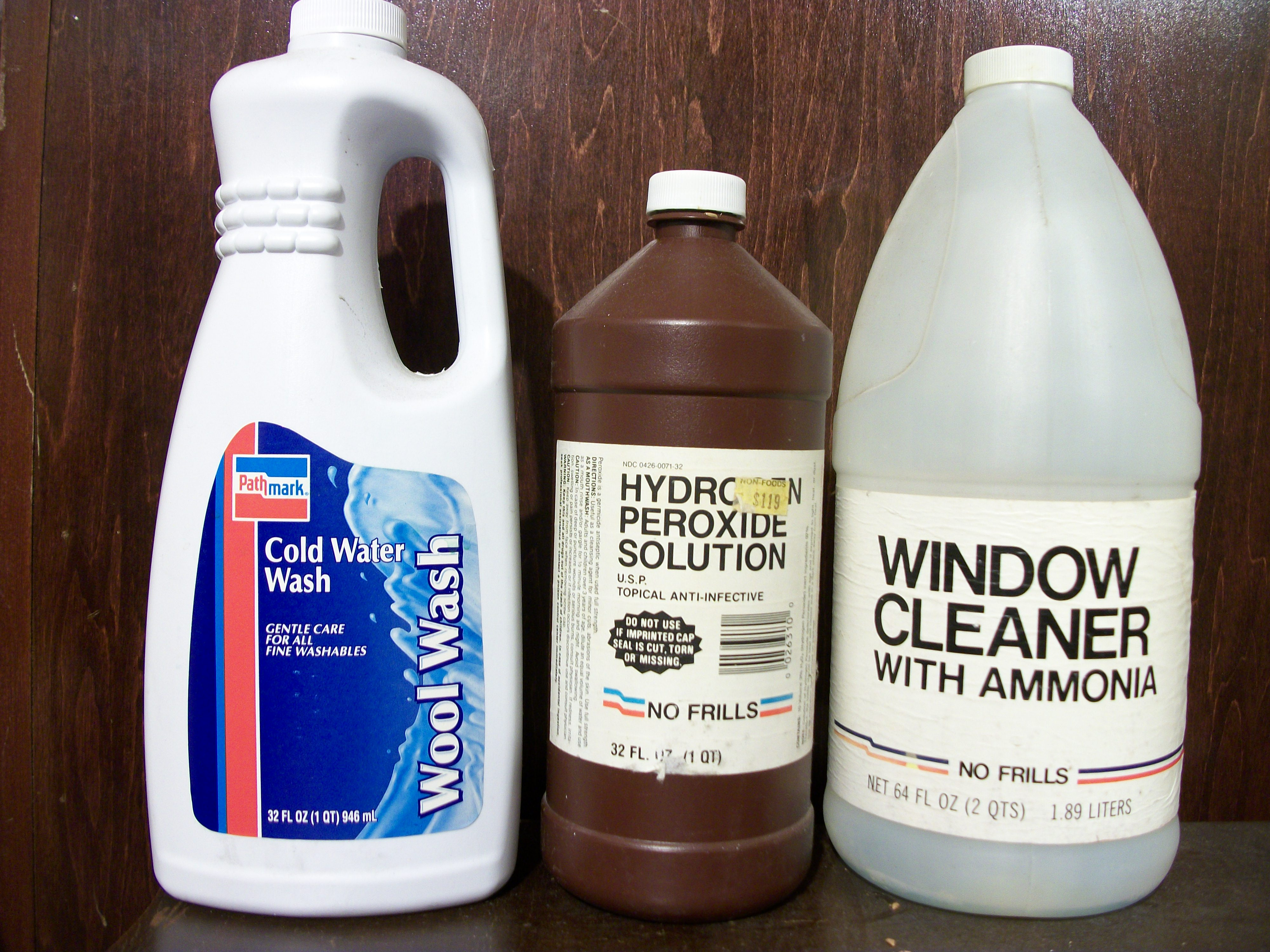
Example of retired Pathmark generic brands. This bottle of wool wash bears Pathmark's then-new late 1990s logo, while the peroxide and window cleaner are from Pathmark's "No Frills" brand introduced during the 1980s generic product craze

By 1995, there were 27 Pathmark 2000 stores in operation. In August 1995, Pathmark launched Chef's Creations, which offered a menu of entrees, side dishes, and salads, made daily by a team of chefs.

Pathmark was named 1995 "Pharmacy Chain of the Year" by the magazine Drug Topics, the first time a supermarket had won the award. Of Pathmark's 142 supermarkets, all had pharmacies except six found in shopping centers. Prescriptions accounted for nearly 7% of Pathmark's sales volume in 1994.

In May 1995, Purity Supreme supermarkets and its Li'l Peach convenience stores were sold to Stop and Shop. In June, Pathmark reduced its pharmacy operations, selling 30 of its 36 freestanding drugstores to Rite Aid Corp. for $60 million (~$112 million in 2024) in order to concentrate on its in-store pharmacies. In December, Pathmark announced it would be closing its six remaining drugstores operating under the "Super Drug" banner in Connecticut. Pathmark's two remaining Connecticut supermarkets, in Bridgeport and Norwalk, were closed in September 1998, signaling Pathmark's exit from New England.

In February 1996, Pathmark announced a restructuring of the company that split its two operating divisions into five marketing regions covering 30 stores each: New York City and Connecticut, Long Island, northern New Jersey, central New Jersey and the Greater Philadelphia area. In March, chief executive Jack Futterman left the company and president Anthony Cuti quit in April. Pathmark appointed James Donald, formerly with Safeway and Walmart, as its chief executive and chairman that October. By January, he had the company cut about a third of its executives. In late 1996, Pathmark introduced Chef's Creations To Go, fresh, prepackaged meals for takeout, offering choice entrees and side dishes in microwavable containers.

After five years, construction began in August 1997 on Pathmark's controversial $14.5 million (~$26.2 million in 2024) supermarket on 125th Street in Manhattan's East Harlem. This 53,000-square-foot (4,900 m^{2}) unit was the largest supermarket in Harlem, and had been bitterly opposed by owners of neighborhood convenience stores. This Pathmark was expected to generate hundreds of construction jobs, and within the store, which would include a pharmacy and a Chase bank branch. It opened for business in April 1999. Pathmark was planning its biggest Bronx store in 1998: a 55,000-square-foot (5,100 m^{2}) unit on 10 acres (40,000 m^{2}) in the blighted area east of Crotona Park.

In fiscal year 1997 (ending February 1, 1997), the parent company had a net loss of $20 million on sales of $3.71 billion. This included a charge the company took for the upcoming sale of 12 unprofitable Pathmark stores, mostly in southern New Jersey. Pathmark's supermarket sales came to all but $9 million of the corporate total. Same-store sales decreased 2.8 percent from the previous fiscal year, primarily due to heavy competition.

In October 1997, Pathmark announced that C&S Wholesale Grocers of Brattleboro, Vermont would take over its Woodbridge, New Jersey distribution facilities and become the chain's supplier for almost all groceries and perishables. The facilities also included a frozen food distribution facility in Dayton, New Jersey, a complex for dry groceries in New Brunswick, New Jersey, and one for general merchandise in Edison, New Jersey. It had processing facilities for delicatessen products in Somerset, New Jersey and for banana ripening in Avenel, New Jersey. Pathmark received $50 million from the deal, which was used towards its $1.47 billion debt.

=== Failed Ahold bid and bankruptcy ===
In March 1999, Royal Ahold, a Dutch supermarket company which operated Edwards stores in the New York area, agreed to a $1.75 billion deal to acquire Pathmark. Under the terms of the deal, Edwards Super Food Stores would become Pathmark stores. The sale was abandoned after the FTC rejected Ahold's offer to divest overlapping stores, saying the offer would "not preserve competition" in the New York area. Ahold ultimately cancelled the deal and later announced that it would rebrand Edwards stores as Stop & Shop.

In September 1999, the company started selling prepackaged veal, lamb and pork products instead of fresh cut meat. In November, Pathmark opened its first, smaller community store in the Kew Gardens neighborhood of Queens.

Because the FTC did not allow Pathmark's acquisition plans, it filed for bankruptcy in July 2000, recovering a year later. In February 2001, Pathmark bought six Grand Union supermarkets after C&S bought the chain. In March 2002, Stop & Shop purchased 26 Big V Supermarkets, selling nine of them to Pathmark. In March 2005, Yucaipa Companies paid $150 million for a 40 percent stake in Pathmark.

In February 2007, Pathmark partnered with Wild Oats Markets by adding Wild Oats-brand private label goods to the 141 Pathmarks. Approximately 150 organic and natural products were included in the partnership, among them: Italian sodas, balsamic vinegar, organic fruit spreads, and flatbread crackers.

=== A&P Takeover and Pathmark Sav-A-Center ===
In March 2007, Pathmark's competitor A&P bought it for $678.6 million. Conditions for the acquisition included the sale of five Waldbaum's locations and one Pathmark store. Pathmark and A&P remained separate banners. Store level staff were not affected, while buying and back-office functions were consolidated. A&P sold off Pathmark's Carteret, New Jersey headquarters in June 2008. The merger was approved on December 3, with the sale completed that month.

In spring 2008, Pathmark introduced a "price impact" store concept, under the Pathmark Sav-A-Center brand. This format was introduced to remodeled stores in Irvington and South Edison, New Jersey. The Sav-A-Center name had been used for A&P stores in the 1980s, and for an A&P-owned chain of stores in the New Orleans area which were sold in 2007.

After the concept was tested in the two Northern New Jersey stores, A&P announced the conversion of 16 Pathmark Super Centers, plus eight of the 13 Philadelphia-area A&P Super Fresh stores to the Pathmark Sav-A-Center banner. A&P eventually rolled out the Sav-A-Center branding to Pathmark's website and circulars.

In 2009, several changes were made to Pathmark. In July, the Randolph, New Jersey store was closed. A former A&P in nearby South Plainfield opened as a Pathmark Sav-A-Center. The North Plainfield Pathmark also closed as part of this store consolidation. Meanwhile, A&P was updating its former Super Center branding by retrofitting older stores with new interior decor to comply with its Sav-A-Center branding.

=== A&P bankruptcy filings and closing ===
In August 2010, A&P announced it would close 25 stores, including nine Pathmark locations in New Jersey.

On December 12, 2010, A&P filed for Chapter 11 bankruptcy protection, citing assets of $2.5 billion and debts totaling $3.2 billion. The company emerged from bankruptcy protection on March 13, 2012, making its six supermarket divisions, including Pathmark, private.

In August 2011, a Super Fresh store opened in the Northern Liberties section of Philadelphia in place of a planned Pathmark, reflecting the parent company's diminished faith in the Pathmark banner.

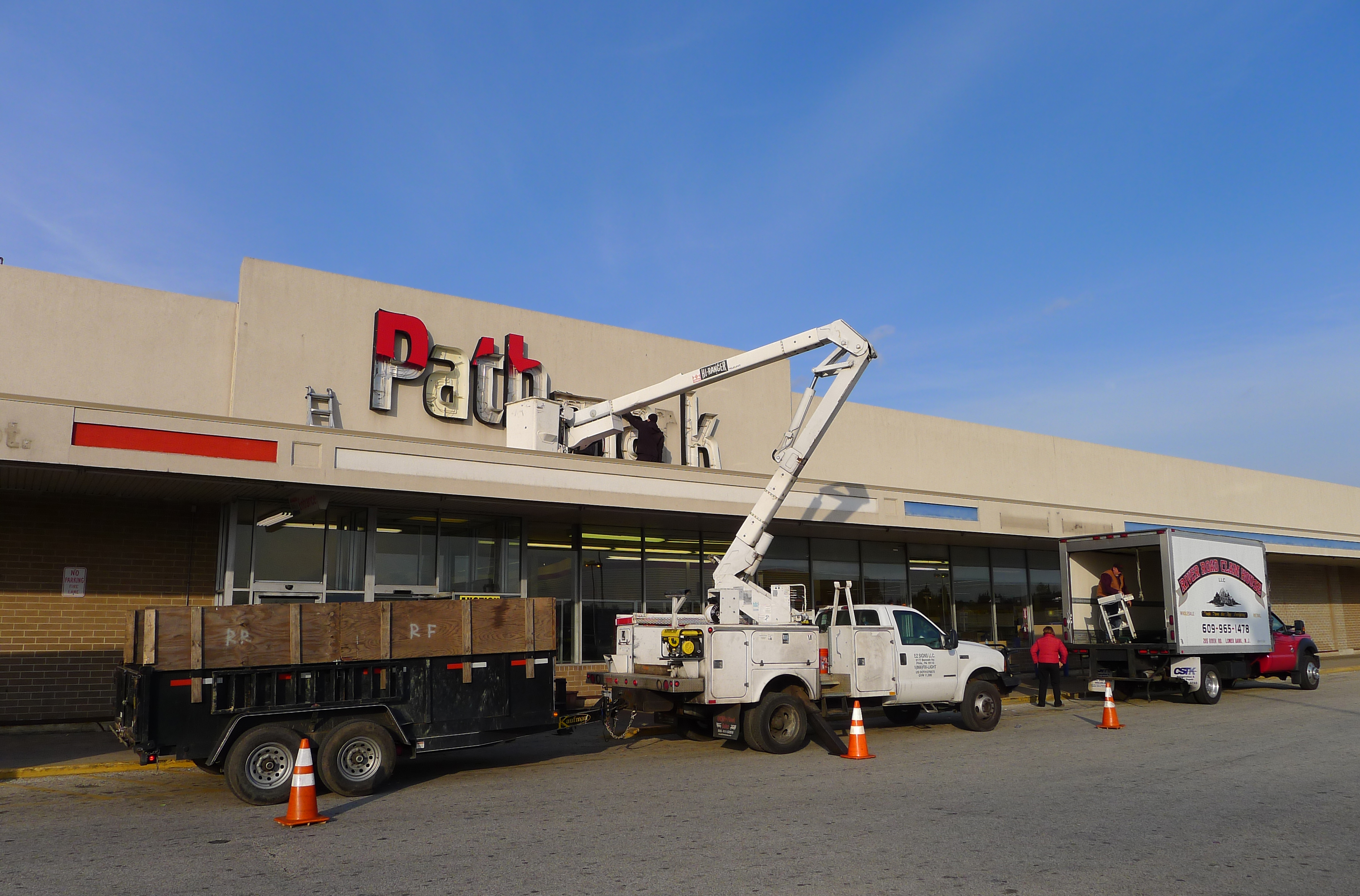
Pathmark supermarket in Egg Harbor Township, NJ closing in 2012 as workers take down the Pathmark sign.

In August 2012, an employee of the Old Bridge, New Jersey Pathmark opened fire on his coworkers with an assault rifle while working an overnight shift. Two employees were killed before he took his own life.

On July 26, 2013, the Wall Street Journal reported that A&P was seeking to sell the company after emerging from bankruptcy in 2012.

On July 19, 2015, A&P filed for Chapter 11 protection for the second time in less than five years. The company announced that 25 stores would be closed immediately, including 16 Pathmark locations. Other locations were sold. By November 25, 2015, all Pathmark stores were either closed or sold to other chains such as Acme Markets, Stop & Shop, Key Food, ShopRite, and other competitors.

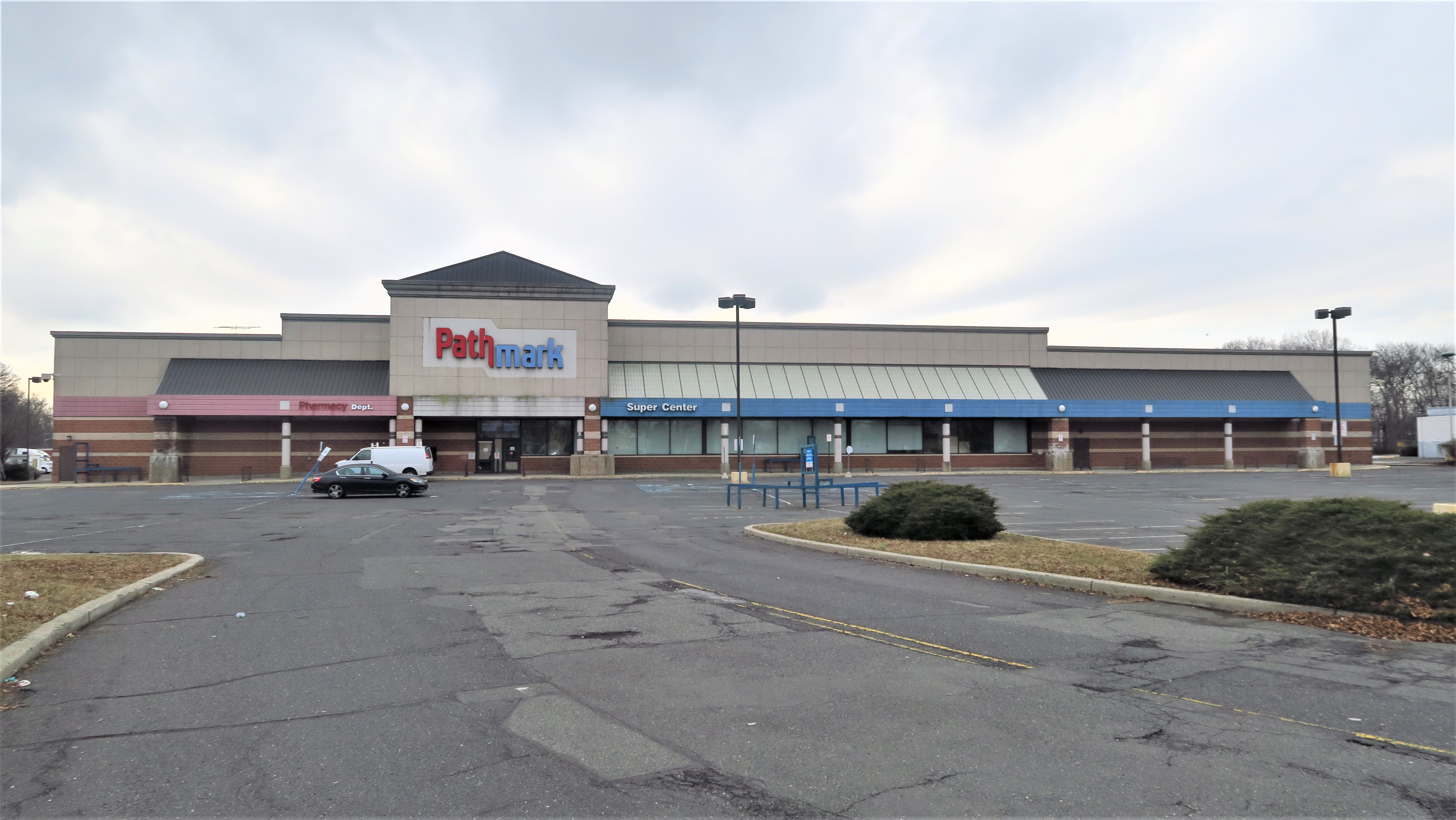
Former Pathmark location in Linden, NJ

=== Revival ===
In 2016, Allegiance Retail Services LLC bought up several stores and the corporation's intellectual property. It renovated and reopened the East Flatbush Pathmark store in April 2019.

In May 2026, Allegiance opened its first Pathmark Daily store in East Meadow, Long Island, New York. The store was converted from a Super Foodtown, another supermarket brand owned by Allegiance. The store has a smaller format than a typical Pathmark store.

== Slogans ==
- Shop Pathmark, the store for value (1968–1978)
- All Signs Point to Pathmark for One Stop Shopping (1978–1981)
- You've got Pathmark. Who could ask for anything more? (1978–1981)
- We're Pathmark, We're All-Ways There! (1981–1982)
- Savings all over means savings over all (1982–1984)
- You're the one who's number one (1984–1988)
- Pathmark, More Value For Your Dollar (1988–1990)
- Count on Pathmark For Savings That Count (1991–1992)
- Count on Pathmark For Savings That (Really) Count (1991–1994)
- Pathmark, Your Place to Really Save (1993–1994)
- Shop Smart, Pathmark Smart (1994–1998)
- Pathmark, The way it should be! (1998–2000)
- Pathmark, Take a Fresh Look (2000–2002)
- Get a Little More at Pathmark (2002–2004)
- Pathmark, It's about time (2004–2006)
- Go Fresh. Go Local. (2006–2008)
- Fresh For Less (2008)
- Count On Pathmark When It Counts (2008–2009)
- Pathmark! Save all over the place! (2009 – April 2010)
- Where the only prices are low prices. (April 2010 – January 2011)
- Your Store For Value! (January 2011 – March 2011)
- Great Food. Great Value. (March 2011 – November 2015)
- We priced it right (April 2019 – present)
- Pathmark makes life easier. (January 2019 – present)
