= Forman Mills =

New Jersey-based retail chain

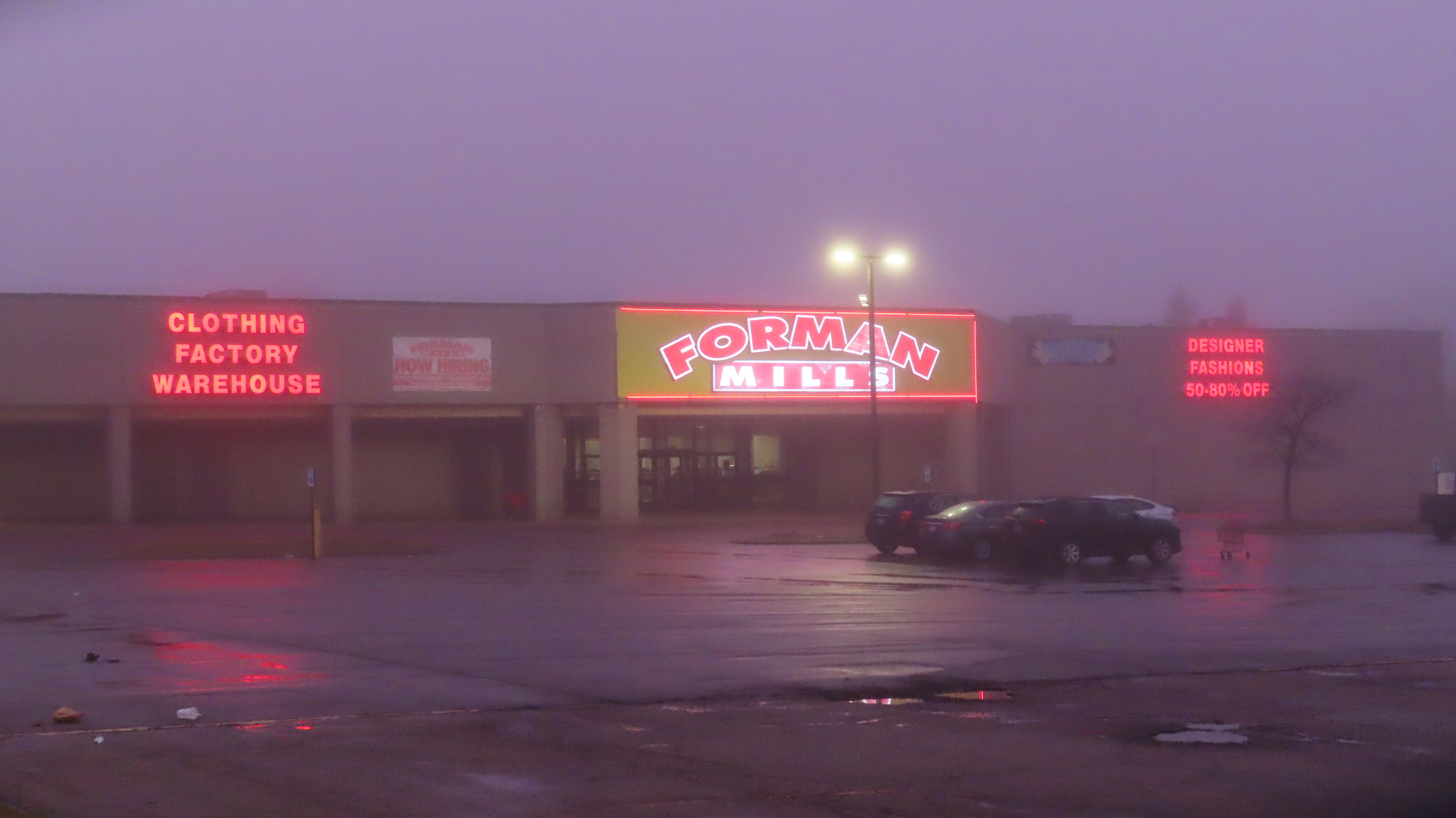
- Forman Mills in Pontiac, Michigan
- Type: Private, Subsidiary
- Industry: Retail
- Founded: 1985; 41 years ago Philadelphia, Pennsylvania, U.S.
- Founder: Rick Forman
- Headquarters: 3000 Cindel Dr, Riverton, New Jersey, U.S.
- Number of locations: 47 (2025)
- Area served: Maryland, Washington, DC, Pennsylvania, New Jersey, Delaware, New York City, Ohio, Michigan, Illinois and Wisconsin
- Key people: Sam A. Dushey (CEO)
- Products: Clothing, footwear, toys, and household essentials
- Owner: Dushey Family
- Website: formanmills.com

Forman Mills, Inc. is a retail chain and department store based in Pennsauken, New Jersey, with 44 stores. The chain is known for their low-priced clothing such as shirts, pants, shorts, capri pants, and hats.

== History ==
Forman Mills was founded in 1985 in South Philadelphia by Rick Forman under the name Forman Mills Clothing Factory Warehouse.

The chain was sold to Goode Partners L.L.C., a New York investment group, in October 2016. In June 2023, it was sold again to the Dushey family, who own New York–based Shoppers World.
