= List of defunct retailers of the United States =

Below is a list of notable defunct retailers of the United States.

== Automotive ==
- Al's Auto Supply – Chain that operated in Washington, California, Idaho, Oregon, Nevada, and Alaska; purchased by CSK Auto. Founded by Abe "Al" Wexler in Everett, Washington in the late 1950s; sold 15 store chain to Paccar in 1987; Paccar sold chain (along with Grand Auto) in 1999 to CSK Auto which eventually rebranded stores as Schucks.
- Auto Palace – A New England-based chain that had 112 stores in six states before it was acquired and rebranded by AutoZone in 1998
- Auto Works – Began in Michigan in 1976 by Perry Drug Stores and which grew mostly through acquisitions prior to being sold to Northern Automotive in 1988. In turn, Northern became CSK and CSK sold Auto Works to Hahn Automotive in 1993 before Hahn finally closed Auto Works in 1997. At its height, there were 252 stores in eight states.
- Chief Auto Parts – acquired and rebranded by AutoZone in 1998
- CSK Auto – (CSK = Checker, Schucks, Kragen) based in Phoenix, Arizona with stores nationwide; bought by O'Reilly Auto Parts in 2008
- Parts America – Sears created the Parts America store concept in 1995 and tried to convert full service Western Auto stores into the parts-only Parts America brand until it sold the stores to Advance Auto Parts in 1998. Upon merger, Parts America stores were rebranded Advance Auto Parts and the website partsamerica.com became a web only store for Advance Auto Parts. With financial backing from Sears, Advance Auto Parts decided to make the partsamerica.com into a portal for web purchasing of auto parts as part of a joint venture with CSK Auto. The website appeared to have been deactivated by 2009.
- Super Shops – filed for bankruptcy in 1998
- Trak Auto – Mid-Atlantic, Midwest, and West Coast; founded by Robert Haft (Crown Books) in 1981; purchased and rebranded by Advance Auto Parts in 2002
- Western Auto – nationwide, once had 1,800 locations, purchased by Sears in 1987 and sold to and rebranded by Advance Auto Parts in 1998

== Camping, sports or athletic stores ==
- Davega Stores – bankrupt in 1963
- Eddie Bauer – closed in 2026.
- Galyan's Trading Post – acquired by Dick's Sporting Goods in 2004
- Gander Mountain – rebranded as Gander Outdoors in 2019 following bankruptcy and reorganization
- G.I. Joe's – Oregon and Washington; rebranded as Joe's in 2007, went bankrupt and closed in 2009; seven locations taken over by Dick's Sporting Goods
- Golfsmith – went bankrupt in 2016 and was acquired by Dick's Sporting Goods; 36-38 locations rebranded as Golf Galaxy
- Herman's World of Sporting Goods – went bankrupt in 1993 and closed in 1996
- Just for Feet – bankrupt in 1999, acquired by Footstar, final stores closed in 2004
- MC Sports – filed for bankruptcy and closed in 2017
- Modell's Sporting Goods – first store opened in 1889. On March 11, 2020, the company filed for bankruptcy and announced it would close all 115 stores. At the time of the announcement, Modell's was the world's oldest sporting goods chain
- Moosejaw – was acquired by Dick's Sporting Goods in 2023 and rebranded under Dick's "Public Lands" brand; most of the physical stores were closed.
- Olympia Sports – the company was founded in 1975, and on July 22, 2022, the company filed for bankruptcy and announced it would close all 35 stores by September 30
- Oshman's Sporting Goods – founded in Houston in 1933; acquired by Gart Sports in 2001; most stores rebranded as Sports Authority
- Sportmart – Merged with Gart Sports in 1998 and then merged with Sports Authority in 2003; All stores were branded into Sports Authority by 2006.
- Sports Authority – bankrupt in 2016 and liquidated. Brand was acquired by Dick's Sporting Goods
- Sports Unlimited – First store in 1983. In 2008, it closed all stores and moved online.
- Sport Chalet – went bankrupt and closed in 2016
- Sportswest – owned by Pay 'n Save and spun off in 1984; acquired by Big 5 Sporting Goods in 1988
- Sunny's Surplus – went bankrupt in 2000 but emerged in 2001; filed for bankruptcy again in 2007 and closed most locations; three reopened in late 2007 but shut down again in 2008

== Catalog showrooms ==
- Best Products – filed for bankruptcy for the second time in September 1996 and closed all of its stores by the following February
- Brendle's – became bankrupt and liquidated in 1996
- Consumers Distributing – sought bankruptcy protection in 1996
- Ellman's – acquired by Service Merchandise in 1985
- H. J. Wilson Co. – Southern states, based in Baton Rouge, Louisiana; acquired by Service Merchandise in 1986
- K's Merchandise Mart – liquidated in 2006
- Luria's – originally L. Luria & Son, was a chain of catalog showroom stores in Florida, from 1961 to 1997.
- Service Merchandise – closed all its retail stores by early 2002; the name was resurrected in 2004 for an online retail operation
- Witmark – operated in southwestern Michigan; founded 1969, liquidated 1997

== Clothing, shoe and specialty stores ==
- Abby Z. – plus size design label founded by Abby Zeichner in 2004. The Abby Z flagship store opened in SoHo, New York at 57 Greene Street in 2008 and closed in 2009 when its parent company filed for bankruptcy.
- Alfred Angelo – closed all stores in 2017 without warning customers
- American Apparel – closed all stores in 2017 after acquisition by Gildan Activewear but still exists online
- Anchor Blue – youth-oriented mall chain, founded in 1972 as Miller's Outpost. The brand had 150 stores at its peak, predominantly on the West Coast. Anchor Blue declared bankruptcy in 2009 and shuttered more than 50 stores, and gradually shrank to include stores solely in California. It went bankrupt once more in 2011, with the remaining stores closed before Easter of that year.
- Anderson-Little – men's specialty retailer originally associated with a large Massachusetts-based men's clothing manufacturer; also known as Anderson Little-Richman Brothers; owned for many years by F. W. Woolworth Company. Ceased operations in 1998, revived as a small online retailer in 2008.
- Arden B. – closed by Wet Seal in 2014
- Avenue (store) – closed in 2019
- Bob's Stores – Suffered bankruptcy in 2024, closed all stores in July.
- BuyBuy Baby
- Casual Corner – liquidated in 2005
- Chess King – sold to Merry-Go-Round in 1993; liquidated along with that chain in 1995
- Christopher & Banks – bankrupted in 2021 from financial loss, because of the COVID-19 pandemic
- Club Libby Lu – closed by Saks
- County Seat – founded in 1973, the denim-focused mall retailer expanded in the 1980s to nearly 500 stores. It filed for bankruptcy in 1996 and shuttered stores, and another bankruptcy in 1999 put the company out of business.
- Cygnet Shops – women's fashion store that closed in 1975
- DEB – closed its stores in 2015, and returned later that year as an online-only retailer selling plus-size clothing
- Delia's – founded in 1993 as a juniors' clothing catalog, Delia's (stylized as dELiA*s) expanded to more than 100 physical locations before cheaper competitors sent it to bankruptcy in 2014. It was reopened in 2015 as an online retailer, but this was unsuccessful and has been licensed by online fashion company Dolls Kill since 2018.
- Disney Store – owned and operated by The Walt Disney Company. Closed the majority of its retail stores in 2021 mainly due to the COVID-19 pandemic, with merchandise moved online and to department stores such as Target and JCPenney.
- Dressbarn – closed all stores in 2019 but still operates online
- Edison Brothers Stores – operator of numerous shoe and clothing chains, including Bakers Shoes, Wild Pair, J. Riggings, Oaktree, Foxmoor and Fashion Conspiracy. Company was liquidated in 1999, though some chains it operated, including Bakers, have survived.
- Fashion Bug – plus-size women's clothing retailer that once spanned more than 1000 stores. Parent company Charming Shoppes, which owned other plus-size retailers including Lane Bryant, shuttered the brand in early 2013.
- Footstar
- Forever 21 – Still exists outside of USA, plans to reopen stores.
- Foxmoor Casuals – Closed in Edison Brothers Stores liquidation.
- Florsheim – mall shoe store; still sells online
- Francesca's – Closed in March 2026.
- Gadzooks – Founded in 1983 as a T-shirt store, Gadzooks grew to a 250-store mall fashion retailer before making an ill-advised decision to discontinue menswear. The company was purchased by competitor Forever 21 out of bankruptcy in 2005, with its stores either closed or converted to F21 formats.
- Gantos – a women's specialty clothing retailer based in Grand Rapids, Michigan. In late 1993, the company announced bankruptcy reorganization, closing 50 stores between 1993 and 1994, and the chain announced the liquidation of its remaining 114 stores by the end of the decade, ceasing operations in 2000.
- Goody's (store) – defunct 2009, revived 2010, defunct again in 2020
- Gordmans – would file for Chapter 11 bankruptcy and would get bought by Stage Stores which filed for bankruptcy in May 2020 and all Gordmans stores would be closed.
- Gottschalks – Founded in 1904, this middle-market regional department store was once the largest independently owned, publicly traded department store in the United States. Bankruptcy claimed the brand in 2009.
- Hahn's Shoes (1876–1995) – Washington, D.C. region
- Harold's – founded in 1948 in Norman, Oklahoma, and liquidated through bankruptcy in 2008
- Hess Shoe Store (1872–1999) – Baltimore, Maryland region.
- J. Brannam – a unit of the F. W. Woolworth Company established in 1979 that operated primarily in the southern U.S.; closed in 1985
- Jay Jacobs – Seattle-based clothier; founded in 1941 and closed in 1999
- Justice (store) – closed all retail stores in 2020 but still is a clothing brand at Walmart
- Kids "R" Us – a division of Toys "R" Us, created in 1983 to sell children's and preteen clothing; folded in 2003
- Kinney Shoes – manufacturer and retailer established in 1894 and purchased by F.W. Woolworth in 1963
- Kleinhans – a men's clothier in Buffalo, New York that operated from 1893 until 1992
- Klopfenstein's – a men's clothier in the Seattle-Tacoma area founded in 1918 and in operation until 1992
- Limited Too – retail stores closed in 2008
- The Limited – filed for bankruptcy and liquidated in 2017. Its products became available again online after the brand was acquired by Sycamore Properties.
- Margo's LaMode – Dallas-based women's clothing store that closed in 1996 after corporate parent underwent bankruptcy reorganization
- Martin + Osa – Established in 2006 as the more mature counterpart to American Eagle Outfitters, the chain grew to 28 stores before millions in losses forced its parent company to discontinue it. The brand's stores and e-commerce site disappeared in 2010.
- Merry-Go-Round – Merry-Go-Round had more than 500 locations during its heyday in the 1980s. It went bankrupt in 1995.
- Miller's Outpost – see "Anchor Blue" above
- Papyrus (company) – The company closed all of its stores in 2020 due to its parent company filing for Chapter 11 bankruptcy, but Papyrus still remains a brand on some greeting cards.
- Payless (footwear retailer) – Filed for bankruptcy twice and closed all stores in Canada and the US in 2019.
- Raleigh's – also known as Raleigh Haberdasher; a men's and women's clothing store in Washington, D.C., 1911–1992
- Robert Hall – clothing store that existed from 1938 to 1977. At its peak, the store had locations in both New York City and Los Angeles. In addition, the firm invented the big box concept where all non-clothing lines were leased by other retailers.
- Rogers Peet – New York City based men's clothing retailer established in late 1874. Among the chain's innovations: Rogers Peet showed actual merchandise in their advertising, advertised fabric types on merchandise, and put price tags on merchandise. The chain went belly-up in 1981.
- Roos/Atkins – a San Francisco menswear retailer formed in 1957 and expanded throughout the Bay Area in the 60s. The brand went into decline in the 1980s and ceased operations by 1995.
- Ruehl No.925 – concept brand launched by Abercrombie & Fitch in 2004; poor sales and operating losses led to A&F ceasing operations of Ruehl in early 2010
- The Sample – Western New York-based retailer founded in Buffalo in 1928 when its founder brought a sample set of 48 dresses back from New York City. At its peak, the retailer was noted for its semi-annual clearance known as the Pup Sale. The demise of The Sample was in 1991 following the death of the chain's chairman a year earlier.
- Sibley's Shoes – a show retailer founded by Harry Rosenfield in 1920; had locations in Michigan and Ohio and closed in 2003 when the company's executives decided not to save the company
- Stein Mart – closed all stores in 2020 however still exists online
- Steve & Barry's – "extreme value" retail clothing chain that operated 276 stores in 39 states.
- Sycamore Shops – an Indianapolis-based women's clothing retailer; spun off from L.S. Ayres; was later forced into bankruptcy and liquidated by early 1996
- Syms – closed all stores in 2013 with Filene's Basement
- Thom McAn – shoe retailer founded in 1922; had over 1,400 stores at its peak in the 1960s. In 1996, the parent company decided to close all remaining stores, but Thom McAn footwear is available in Kmart stores.
- The Fair Store - Retail clothing store in Port Arthur, Texas and Beaumont, Texas during the 1970s
- Things Remembered – still exists online but closed all stores in 2022
- Today's Man – a men's suiting store that began in the 1970s and expanded rapidly in the 1980s and 90s. Overexpansion brought the brand to bankruptcy in 1996.
- Virginia Dare Dresses, Incorporated – merged with Atlantic Thrift Centers, Inc in 1963
- Warner Brothers Studio Store – Meant to be the WB answer to the rapidly growing Disney Store, the Warner Bros. Studio Stores sold collectibles and apparel based around WB properties including Looney Tunes and DC Comics. The Studio Stores were a victim of the AOL-Time Warner merger, and shuttered operations in 2001.
- Wet Seal
- Yellow Front Stores – Founded in the 1950s as an army surplus store, Yellow Front transitioned to become a camping gear retailer before going bankrupt in 1990.

== Drug stores ==
- A. L. Price – Metro Detroit; part of Perry Drug Stores
- Adams Drug Company – acquired 1984
- Arbor Drugs – Michigan-based chain; acquired by CVS Pharmacy
- Bartell Drugs - converted into CVS
- Big "B" Drugs – acquired by Revco in 1996
- Brooks Pharmacy – chain of more than 330 pharmacies located throughout New England and New York, with corporate headquarters were located in Warwick, Rhode Island; was acquired by Rite Aid in 2007
- Cunningham Drug Stores – Metro Detroit, Michigan area; founded 1889, dissolved in 1982
- Dart Drug – converted to Fantle's
- Dorb the Chemist, Inc. – filed for bankruptcy in 1932
- Drug Emporium – closed 2003 after being acquired by Snyder Drug
- Drug Fair – Alexandria, Virginia-based drug chain.
- Eckerd Corporation – acquired by CVS Pharmacy in the South and Rite Aid in the Northeast–Mid atlantic Region
- Fantle's – short lived chain that was a successor from Dart Drug; closed in 1990
- Farmacias El Amal – San Juan, Puerto Rico, firm; 20 locations bought by Walgreens in 2008; remaining closed in 2011
- Fay's Drug – Merged into Eckerd
- G. O. Guy – acquired by Thrifty PayLess
- Genovese Drug Stores
- Gray Drug – purchased by Rite Aid
- Haag Drug Company
- Happy Harry's – acquired by Walgreens
- Hook's Drug Stores – acquired by Revco
- K&B (also known as Katz & Bestoff) – a New Orleans, Louisiana-based pharmacy and general merchandise store chain
- Kerr Drug – Raleigh-based drug store chain with 76 locations before being acquired by Walgreens in 2013
- Kinsley & Darling Druggists
- LaVerdiere's Super Drug Stores – a Maine-based pharmacy acquired by Rite Aid in 1994
- Osco Drug & Sav-on Drugs – freestanding locations acquired by CVS Pharmacy; Osco still exists as the pharmacy within Jewel
- Pay 'n Save
- Peoples Drug – acquired by CVS Pharmacy
- Perry Drug Stores – acquired by Rite Aid in 1995
- Phar-Mor – bankrupt due to $500 million embezzlement; some assets acquired by Giant Eagle
- Read's Drug Store
- Reliable Drug Stores
- Revco – Most locations acquired by CVS Pharmacy and Some Locations In Virginia and Binghamton Were Acquired by Eckerd Corporation
- Rexall
- Rite Aid – Closed its last store on September 29, 2025 after 63 years in business.
- Rx Place – Woolworth
- Schwab's Pharmacy – Hollywood, California, hangout for movie actors; closed in 1983
- Skaggs Drug Centers – became part of Albertsons, Inc.
- Snyder Drug Stores – acquired by Walgreens in 2010
- Standard Drug Company – was part of Melville Corporation
- SupeRx – Kroger created the first SupeRx store in 1961 with most stores next door or very close to existing Kroger stores
- Thrift Drug – merged into Eckerd after J.C. Penney bought Eckerd
- Thrifty PayLess – acquired by Rite Aid in 1996
- Treasury Drug – acquired by J.C. Penney, then shuttered in 1980
- Value Giant
- Wellby Super Drug

== Electronics stores ==
- 47th Street Photo – Closed 1997
- Allied Radio – Chicago, Illinois, acquired by Radio Shack in 1970; some stores sold to Schaak Electronics in 1973, a few stores converted to Radio Shack, and the rest closed
- Bernie's – Bankrupt 2010
- Best Buy Mobile – Shut down by Best Buy in 2018.
- Bryn Mawr Stereo – acquired by Tweeter in 1996
- Circuit City – filed for bankruptcy in 2008 and liquidated on March 8, 2009; reopened online through Tiger Direct in April 2009; closed again in late December 2012; intellectual property was sold again to Circuit City Corp. in January 2016, which plans to open an online operation and retail stores
- CompuAdd – bankrupted in 1993 and ran a chain of superstores in the 80s/90s
- CompUSA – on November 2, 2012, it was announced that Systemax would drop both the CompUSA and Circuit City storefront brands; CompUSA was relaunched in 2018 as an online retailer.
- Computer City – CompUSA quickly closed this chain after purchasing it from Tandy in 1998
- ComputerLand – closed in 1999
- Crazy Eddie – liquidated in 1989
- Davega Stores – bankrupt in 1963
- Douglas TV – Chicago-area electronics retailer founded in the 1970s; acquired by Tweeter
- DOW Stereo/Video – acquired by Tweeter in 1999
- Erol's – Founded by Erol Onaran
- Federated Group – Acquired by Silo in 1989
- Fretter – Went bankrupt in 1996
- Fry's Electronics – Closed permanently in 2021 after 35 years as a result of low sales, and potentially bankruptcy and liquidation due to online competition and the COVID-19 pandemic
- Future Shop – Closed in the US 1999. Bought out by Best Buy 2001. March 28, 2015, Best Buy announced the dissolution of the Future Shop brand and the closure of 66 of its locations.
- Gateway Country – operated by Gateway from 1996 to 2004
- Good Guys – purchased by CompUSA in 2003
- H. H. Gregg, Inc. Went bankrupt and closed in 2017; it relaunched as an online retailer in 2017 and opened its first brick and mortar store in 2019 following bankruptcy.
- HiFi Buys – acquired by Tweeter in 1997 but they kept the brand name until Tweeter closed in 2008
- Highland Superstores – liquidated in 1993
- Incredible Universe – closed in 1997; six stores acquired by Fry's Electronics and the rest shut down
- J&R – major New York City electronics and music store officially closed in April 2014
- Lafayette Radio – Acquired by Circuit City in 1981
- Lechmere – Liquidated with parent company Montgomery Ward in 1997
- Luskin's – Baltimore, Maryland-based appliance and electronics retailer
- Mars Music – Founded in 1996, over-expansion, a struggle to raise financial capital and a failed reorganization attempt led to Chapter 7 bankruptcy in 2002.
- Newmark and Lewis – Bankrupt 1992
- Olson Electronics (currently a redirect that needs expansion) – a nationwide electronics store chain founded in 1927 by brothers Sidney, Philip and Irving Olsen in Akron, Ohio; at one time had more retail locations than Radio Shack; sold to Teledyne in 1968 and rebranded Teledyne Olson Electronics; later sold to 3 Chicago investors in August 1984 who later filed for bankruptcy just 15 months later; filed for bankruptcy in 1985
- Polk Brothers – Faced competition from Best Buy, liquidated 1992
- Schaak Electronics – liquidated in 1986 after filing for bankruptcy the second time in a decade
- Sharper Image – filed for bankruptcy in 2008 only to relaunch in 2009.
- Silo – Bought out by Fretter in 1995
- Sound Advice – Acquired by Tweeter in 2001
- Sprint Corporation – Acquired by T-Mobile in 2020.
- Steinberg's – bankrupt and liquidated 1997
- Sun Television and Appliances – bankrupt and liquidated in 1998
- Video Concepts – Became RadioShack
- Tech HiFi – Founded by Sandy Ruby
- TigerDirect – In 2015, TigerDirect phased out brick-and-mortar retail operations. Online operations continued until March 31, 2023 when parent company Insight officially retired the brand.
- Tweeter – Went bankrupt in 2008; original company remains as a shell company.
- Ultimate Electronics – Bankrupt 2011
- United Audio Centers – Acquired by Tweeter along with Douglas TV in 2000
- The Warehouse – Still operational in New Zealand
- The Wiz – Revived as an online retailer in 2004

== Five-and-dime; variety stores ==
- Ames
- Ben Franklin (company)
- Caldor
- Danners 5 & 10
- E. J. Korvette
- F. W. Woolworth Company – successor corporation is Foot Locker Inc.
- Fred's
- G. C. Murphy
- GEM
- Gemco
- H. L. Green
- Hills
- Hudson Brothers'
- J.G. McCrory
- Modell's Shopper's World
- J.J. Newberry
- Jamesway
- King's Department Stores
- Kuhn's Big K – acquired by Walmart in 1981
- MacFrugals – merged into Big Lots!
- McLellan's
- Neisner's
- Otasco – Arkansas, Kansas, Oklahoma and Texas
- Richman Gordman – business model was overhauled and name shortened to Gordmans in the late 1990s
- Rodgers – Oregon
- S. Klein
- S. H. Kress
- S. S. Kresge – sold all original S.S. Kresge stores, renamed Kmart in 1977
- Shopper's City
- Sky City
- Sprouse-Reitz
- TG&Y
- Times Square Stores
- TurnStyle
- Two Guys
- W.T. Grant – went bankrupt in 1976; more a small-scale department store than a 5 and 10 variety store
- Woolco – big box store version of Woolworths – owned by F.W. Woolworth
- Zody's
- Zayre

== Furniture stores ==
- American Freight – Went bankrupt in 2024.
- American Signature – Closed in 2026.
- Art Van Furniture – Founded in 1959 in Warren, MI, and operated over 300 stores and outlets in 7 states. On March 5, 2020, Art Van Furniture announced it would liquidate all of its company-owned stores and file for Chapter 11 bankruptcy.
- Badcock Home Furniture &more
- Barker Bros. – Los Angeles-based furniture store chain, which was at one time the largest furniture store chain on the West Coast for nearly a century before it filed for bankruptcy in 1992
- Bombay Company – U.S. stores
- Castro Convertibles – primarily Northeast and Southeast U.S.
- Conn's HomePlus
- Fradkin Brothers Furniture – Baltimore County, Maryland
- Georg Jensen Inc. (New York, NY) (1935-1968)
- Harden Furniture – was in business for 175 years before ceasing operations
- Heilig-Meyers
- Levitz Furniture – was in business for nearly 100 years before liquidating in bankruptcy in early 2008
- Linens 'n Things
- Loves Furniture – closed all stores in 2021 (check Art Van Furniture above)
- Mitchell Gold + Bob Williams
- Rhodes Furniture
- The Room Store
- The RoomPlace
- Seaman's Furniture – merged into Levitz Furniture in 2005
- Sleepy's – merged into Mattress Firm in 2016
- Wickes Furniture – went bankrupt February 3, 2008

== Grocery stores and supermarkets ==
- 365 by Whole Foods Market – converted to regular Whole Foods stores in 2019 after Amazon acquired Whole Foods
- A&P – also known as The Great Atlantic & Pacific Tea Company; filed for bankruptcy for the second time in July 2015 and closed its last store in November 2015
- ABC Markets
- ABCO Foods- former Arizona division of Alpha Beta spun off in 1984; stores closed by 2003
- AJ Bayless- Arizona; stores sold to Bashas' in 1993
- Alpha Beta – converted to Ralphs or Food 4 Less in 1994
- Amazon Fresh--final store closed 2026
- Amazon Go – Shut down its last store in 2026.
- American Fare – Hypermarket chain owned by Kmart and Bruno's Supermarkets, all 3 stores closed in 1994.
- AppleTree Markets – Southeast Texas chain formed after Safeway pulled out of the market, finally closing in 2012.
- Auchan – French hypermarket chain tested in Houston and Chicago, last store closed in 2003.
- Big Bear Stores – Columbus, Ohio based chain; stores closed or sold to Kroger by 2004. Unrelated chain in San Diego with same name sold to Fleming Companies and Albertsons in 1994
- Bigg's – brand discontinued in 2013
- BI-LO – dissolved in 2021
- Big Star Markets
- Bloom (store)
- Bohack
- Bottom Dollar Food – acquired by Aldi 2015
- Boys Markets – converted to Ralphs or Food 4 Less in 1994
- Bruno's
- Buehler Foods – operated as Buehler's Buy-Low
- Buttrey Food & Drug – Montana, Wyoming, North Dakota; sold to Albertsons in 1998
- Cala Foods and Bell Markets – rebranded as DeLano's IGA; others sold to other retailers
- Carrefour – French hypermarket chain tested in Pennsylvania and New Jersey, closed in 1993.
- Carter's Foods
- Chatham Supermarkets – chain headquartered in Southeastern Michigan founded by Royal Supermarkets in the mid-1950s, bankrupt in 1987, acquired by Kroger after defunct
- Clemens Markets – suburban Philadelphia, Pennsylvania; acquired by Giant in 2006
- Colonial Stores
- Dahl's Foods – Des Moines, Iowa-based chain; acquired by Associated Wholesale Grocers after bankruptcy and rebranded as Price Chopper and Cash Saver in 2015
- Delchamps
- Dick's Supermarket – Southwestern Wisconsin; acquired by Piggly Wiggly in 2006
- Dismuke Storehouse – Georgia
- Dominick's – Chicagoland; operated by Safeway from 1998 until the last closures in January 2014; some locations acquired by Jewel, Whole Foods Market, Mariano's Fresh Market, and Heinen's Fine Foods
- Eagle Food Centers- Midwest chain; ceased operations by 2003
- Eisner Food Stores – downstate Illinois chain acquired by Jewel Food Stores, stores converted to the Jewel name by 1985
- Family Mart – Florida-based Family Mart division of A&P was closed in 1999
- Farmer Jack – Metro Detroit; acquired by A&P in 1989, closed July 7, 2007, then liquidated
- Fazio's – originally was Fisher Foods; in California, first known as Fazio's Shopping Bag and then just Fazio's
- Finast (also known as First National Stores) – purchased by Ahold; rebranded Edwards
- Fisher Foods – Renamed Fazio's after a merger in 1965
- Food Fair – later Pantry Pride
- Fresh & Easy – California, Nevada, Arizona; American subsidiary of British retailer Tesco
- Furrs Supermarkets – New Mexico/West Texas; went bankrupt in 2001.
- Genuardi's – defunct as of 2012 as a chain; 2015 all locations
- Giant – Ralphs big box format; Southern California
- Giant Open Air – merged with Farm Fresh Food & Pharmacy
- Hills Supermarkets
- Hinky Dinky – Nebraska chain acquired by Nash Finch in 2000
- Hughes Markets – a Southern California-based supermarket chain that was first acquired by QFC in 1996 and then merger into Ralphs the following year when the parent companies of both Hughes and Ralphs were simultaneously acquired by Fred Meyer
- Hypermart USA – Hypermarket chain owned by Walmart, closed in favor of their new Supercentre concept.
- Jewel T – founded by the Jewel Companies as their discount chain, but was sold to Save-A-Lot in 1984 when Jewel was acquired by American Stores
- Jitney Jungle
- Kash n' Karry – became Sweetbay Supermarket
- Kessel Food Market — Michigan chain sold to Kroger
- Kohl's Food Stores – Wisconsin chain acquired by A&P and closed by 2003
- Laneco – Eastern Pennsylvania/Western New Jersey; closed in 2001
- Loblaws – Northeastern Ohio, Northwestern Pennsylvania and Western New York. Stores in California were sold in 1976.
- Market Basket (California) – Former Kroger-associated chain that operated in Southern California from 1930 to 1982. Not related to similar-named chains in Texas, Louisiana, or New England.
- Mars (supermarket) – Maryland grocery chain which operated from 1943 to 2016.
- Marsh Supermarkets – Indiana and Ohio chain that was liquidated in 2017
- National Tea
- O'Malia's Food Markets – Central Indiana chain that was liquidated in 2017
- Omni Superstore – Dominick's big-box format
- Pantry Pride
- Pathmark
- Pay'n Takit – acquired by Safeway
- Penn Dutch – south Florida chain that liquidated in 2019
- Penn Fruit
- Pick-N-Pay Supermarkets — Cleveland area chain acquired by Finast
- Purity Supreme – Boston area
- QFI
- Quality Markets – owned by Penn Traffic, Western New York; acquired by Tops Friendly Markets
- Rainbow Foods – Twin Cities chain owned by Fleming Companies, then Roundy's. Roundy's exited Minnesota in 2014.
- Red Food – Chattanooga, Tennessee, area; acquired by Bi-Lo Stores
- Red Owl – Upper Midwest; acquired by Supervalu in 1988, one location still exists in Wisconsin
- Sage's – Sage's Complete Markets based in San Bernardino, California, chain that was liquidated in 1973.
- Sav-A-Center – A&P in the New Orleans, Louisiana, region
- Schwegmann Brothers Giant Supermarkets – New Orleans, Louisiana; acquired by National Tea
- Seaway Food Town – Northwest Ohio chain sold to Spartan Stores in 2000; remaining stores closed or sold by 2003
- Seessel's Supermarkets – Memphis chain acquired by Schnucks
- Shopping Bag Food Stores – Southern California chain that was founded in 1930 and later acquired by Vons and then Fazio's before it was rebranded and later sold to Albertsons in 1978
- Shop 'n Save – closed in 2018 when parent company SuperValu (United States) was acquired by United Natural Foods
- Skaggs-Alpha Beta
- Sunflower Market – SuperValu-owned natural foods market; closed in 2008; never affiliated with the southwestern US chain of the same name
- Super Duper
- Super Fresh
- Super Saver Foods
- Supermercado de Walmart – Hispanic grocery store format created by Walmart, both stores closed in 2014.
- SuperValu (United States)
- Sweetbay Supermarket – All locations converted to Winn-Dixie
- Twin Valu – hypermarket launched by SuperValu (owner of Cub Foods and ShopKo) in Cuyahoga Falls, Ohio in 1989 and Euclid, Ohio (1990); closed March 1995
- Ukrop's – Richmond, Virginia chain acquired by Ahold and converted to Martin's in 2010; notable for pioneering ready-to-eat foods in the 1980s
- Victory Supermarkets – Greater Boston chain sold to Hannaford
- Waldbaum's – New York metropolitan area (liquidated in 2015)
- Walmart Express – Convenience store concept created by Walmart, all locations closed in 2016.
- Weingarten's – Houston area, Arkansas, Louisiana; sold to Safeway in 1983
- White Hen Pantry – merged with 7-Eleven in mid-2007
- Wild Oats Markets

== Home decor and craft stores ==
- A.C. Moore – closed in 2019 after facing difficulties from competition from larger craft retailers
- Bombay Company – closed all US stores in 2008 but still has stores in Canada
- Christmas Tree Shops - Bankrupt and closed all stores in 2023
- Frank's Nursery & Crafts – closed 2004; revived as online retailer in 2022
- Hancock Fabrics – bankrupt 2016; intellectual property acquired by Michaels
- Leewards – acquired in 1994 by Michaels and all Leewards were liquidated or converted into the Michaels brand
- Joann Fabrics – filed for bankruptcy in 2025 and was bought by private equity. After that, they liquidated the brand
- Old America – bankrupt 1999 and liquidated remaining stores
- Party City - franchised locations remain in Hawaii and Texas
- Pier 1 Imports – permanently closed all 540 of its stores in 2020
- Tuesday Morning – closed all stores but still exists via e-commerce
- Waccamaw's Homeplace/Waccamaw Pottery – started out as Waccamaw Pottery; merged with a home retailer called HomePlace in 1999, becoming Waccamaw's HomePlace. The company didn't last long and closed all stores in 2001
- Wicks 'N' Sticks – closed all corporate-owned stores after filing for bankruptcy in 2006; some independently owned franchise locations remained open with the last one closing at the Volusia Mall in 2016
- Z Gallerie – Closed last store in 2023.

== Home improvement ==
- Builder's Emporium
- Builder's Square – subsidiary of Kmart; sold to Hechinger
- Channel Home Centers
- Contractor Supply
- Eagle Hardware & Garden – bought by Lowe's in 1999
- Ernst Home Centers – Seattle, Washington
- EXPO Design Center
- Forest City – became Handy Andy
- Furrow Building Materials
- Gamble-Skogmo – bought by Our Own Hardware in 1986
- Handy Andy Home Improvement Center
- Handy Dan
- Hechinger
- Home Quarters Warehouse (HQ)
- HomeBase
- Hugh M. Woods Building Materials
- Knox Lumber
- Lechters Housewares – a kitchenware and home decor store
- Lumberjack Building Materials
- Orchard Supply Hardware – closed by Lowe's in 2018
- Pay 'N Pak
- Payless Cashways – included Furrows & Payless; all assets liquidated as of November 2001
- Pergament Home Centers
- Rickel
- Scotty's Builders Supply
- Somerville Lumber
- Yardbirds Home Center

== Music, booksellers, and video stores ==
- B. Dalton – closed in 2010. Barnes & Noble Booksellers revived the name in 2022.
- Blockbuster Music – sold to Wherehouse Music in 1998; some locations converted to Wherehouse Music; majority were closed
- Blockbuster Video – sold to Dish Network in 2011; all company-owned stores were closed January 12, 2014, but 1 franchise store remains open in Bend, Oregon.
- Bookstop – closed 1985
- Borders Books – filed for bankruptcy in 2011; some locations purchased by Books-A-Million; borders.com website acquired by Barnes & Noble Booksellers. There are still Borders locations in the Middle East.
- Camelot Music – converted to FYE stores
- CD World – converted to FYE
- Coconuts Music – converted to FYE
- Crown Books – founded by Robert Haft in 1977; liquidated in 2001 after second bankruptcy
- Disc Jockey – converted to FYE
- Encore Books – permanently closed in 1999
- Family Christian Stores – filed for bankruptcy in April 2015, forced to liquidate all stores in 2017
- Family Video – closed all stores in 2021 one of the last video rental chains to survive at time of closure
- Harmony House – Michigan
- Hastings Entertainment – filed for bankruptcy in June 2016. Remaining stores closed October 31, 2016
- Hollywood Video – ceased operations in May 2010
- Incredible Universe – Several stores bought by Frys
- J&R – New York City; closed their music store at the beginning of 2014
- Kim's Video and Music – closed last New York store in 2014
- King Karol – New York City
- Kroch's and Brentano's – Chicago-based bookstore chain; filed for bankruptcy in 1995
- Licorice Pizza – Southern California chain that was started in Long Beach by James Greenwood in 1969, acquired by Record Bar in 1985, acquired by Musicland in 1986, and rebranded Sam Goody. In November 2021, director Paul Thomas Anderson released a movie with the same name loosely based on this chain.
- Media Play – closed and dissolved in 2006; a media superstore (books, music, and video) concept created by Musicland in 1992
- Movie Gallery – operated stores under the Hollywood Video, Movie Gallery, and Game Crazy brands; liquidated and closed in 2010
- MovieStop (purchased by Hastings Entertainment shortly before bankruptcy)
- Music Plus – Southern California-based chain that was acquired by Blockbuster and converted
- Musicland – founded in Minneapolis in 1955, acquired by American Can in 1977; Musicland Group acquired Sam Goody in 1978 while keeping brand separate until 1997 when the Musicland Group decided to rebrand all existing Musicland stores as Sam Goody; Musicland Group acquired by Best Buy in 2001 and eventually sold to Trans World Entertainment
- National Record Mart – a Pittsburgh, Pennsylvania-based company that went bankrupt in 2002
- Peaches Records & Tapes
- Planet Music – converted to FYE
- Record Bar – malls; acquired by Blockbuster in 1993 and converted
- Record Town – store name changed to FYE by parent company Trans World Entertainment
- Record World – company also operated The Record Shops at TSS; was purchased by W.H. Smith after declaring bankruptcy in 1992; rebranded The Wall the following year
- Sam Ash Music – after operating for over 100 years, Sam Ash closed in 2024
- Sam Goody – most locations converted to FYE, but two locations continued to operate as Sam Goody until they closed in 2025.
- Saturday Matinee – converted to FYE
- Sound Warehouse – Dallas, Texas based chain; acquired by Blockbuster in 1992 and all stores converted to Blockbuster Music.
- Spec's Music – Florida-based chain; last store closed in 2013
- Strawberries Music – converted to FYE
- Streetside Records – converted to FYE
- Suncoast Motion Picture Company – converted to FYE, though three continue to operate as Suncoast Motion Picture Company.
- Tape World – a store concept created by Trans World Entertainment in 1979 but later replaced by its f.y.e. store concept
- Tower Records – founded in 1960 in Sacramento, California; all retail stores were liquidated in 2006, and the name was purchased for use as an online-only retailer. Tower Records still operates in Japan.
- Turtle's Records & Tapes – Atlanta, Georgia-based chain with most stores located in Georgia and Florida; acquired by Blockbuster in 1993 and converted
- Video Update – Closed in 2001.
- Virgin Megastores – all Megastores in the United States were closed in 2009 and the remaining airport stores closed a few years later. Stores are still in the Middle East and Northern Africa.
- Waldenbooks – in 2011, the chain was liquidated after parent Borders filed for bankruptcy in 2011
- Wallichs Music City – the largest music retailer on the West Coast during the 1950s and 1960s; founded by Glenn Wallich, founder of Capitol Records; had stores in California and briefly in Arizona before it went bankrupt in 1977
- West Coast Video – permanently closed in 2009
- Wherehouse Music – filed for bankruptcy in 2003; Trans World took control of 111 stores and liquidated nearly a third of them

== Jewelers ==
- Bailey Banks & Biddle (1832-2020)
- Crescent/Friedman's Jewelers
- J. E. Caldwell & Co. (1839-2009)
- Georg Jensen Inc. (New York, NY) (Fifth Ave., Manhattan) (1935-1968)
- Littman Jewelers – shut down by Fred Meyer Jewelers in 2021

== Office supply stores ==
- A. B. Dick Company
- J. K. Gill Company – Pacific Northwest; stationery, office supplies, books; all stores closed by 1999
- Office Warehouse – a Virginia-based office supply chain that was acquired and absorbed by OfficeMax in 1992

== Pet stores ==
- Petland Discounts – permanently closed in 2019.

== Toy stores ==
- All Wound Up – acquired by Borders in 1999 and closed in 2001
- Child World (also known as Children's Palace) – liquidated in 1992
- Circus World – acquired by Melville in 1990 and converted to KB Toys
- F.A.O. Schwarz – sold to Toys 'R Us after bankruptcy in 2009; all stores closed except the original NYC flagship store, which closed in 2015. The chain was bought out by ThreeSixty group and opened two new locations in Rockefeller Center, and LaGuardia airport, with plans to open up to 30 more in the future.
- KB Toys – liquidated February 9, 2009, which closed all of the remaining stores; sold to Toys "R" Us and then to Strategic Marks, LLC; although it planned to reopen stores in 2019, this never happened due to a lack of funding.
- Lionel Kiddie City – founded in 1957 by Leonard Wasserman; liquidated in 1993
- Lionel Playworld – liquidated in 1993
- Noodle Kidoodle – acquired in 2000 by Zany Brainy and rebranded
- Toys "R" Us – liquidated most stores in 2018; still active in Canada and other countries. The company was bought and reformed by its lenders as a brand owned by TRU Kids. On November 27, 2019, Toys "R" Us re-entered the American market with a retail store at Westfield Garden State Plaza in Paramus, New Jersey. On December 7, 2019, a second location was opened at The Galleria in Houston, Texas. Both stores were permanently closed in early 2021. A new standalone location was later opened in the American Dream Mall in New Jersey. On August 19, 2021, Macy's bought Toys "R" Us and announced they will be opening store-within-a-store locations in 400 Macy's locations. More standalone locations will open by the end of 2025.
- Warner Bros. Studio Store – stores closed in 2001
- Zany Brainy – liquidated in 2003 after parent company filed for bankruptcy

== Video games and personal computing software ==
- Babbage's – Became GameStop in 1999
- EB Games – Acquired by GameStop in 2005.
- Egghead Software – Bankrupt in 2001 and domain name acquired by Amazon
- FuncoLand – Merged with Babbage's in 2000 to form GameStop
- GameCrazy – Bankrupt with parent company Movie Gallery in 2010
- Rhino Video Games – Merged into GameStop in 2007
- Software Etc. – Merged with Babbage's in 1994
- ThinkGeek – Closed by GameStop in 2021

== Warehouse clubs and membership stores ==
- E.J. Korvette – gradually liquidated by 1981 after declaring bankruptcy
- Fedco
- GEM – initially called Government Employees Mutual Stores, and later Government Employees Mart before settling on G. E. M. Membership Department Stores, a profit-making company that was aimed at the governmental employees market; first store was opened in Denver in 1956; after several expansions, the company filed for bankruptcy in 1974
- Gemco – acquired by Lucky Stores in 1961; closed in 1986 and the vacant buildings sold to Target; known as Memco in the Chicago and Washington, D.C. metropolitan areas
- Más Club – Hispanic version of Sam's Club, shut down only location in 2014.
- Pace Membership Warehouse – founded in Denver in 1983 and quickly expanded to the East Coast; acquired by Kmart in 1989; later sold to Sam's Club in 1993 and rebranded
- Price Club – merged with Costco in 1993 and rebranded

== See also ==
- Lists of companies
- List of defunct fast-food restaurant chains
- List of defunct restaurants of the United States
