= Today's Man =

Today's Man may refer to:

- Today's Man (retailer), a defunct American retail chain of menswear
- Today's Man (album), a 1973 album by Charles McPherson
- Today's Man, a documentary film by Lizzie Gottlieb
