= Steinberg's (electronics store) =

Electronics Store

Steinberg's Inc.
- Industry: Retail
- Founded: 1921
- Founder: Ely Steinberg
- Defunct: 1997
- Fate: Bankruptcy
- Headquarters: Reading, Ohio, United States
- Area served: Midwestern United States
- Products: Consumer electronics, Home appliances, Office equipment, Parts and accessories, Car audio sales and installation
- Services: Repair and installation

Steinberg's Inc. (/ˈstaɪnbɜːrɡz/ STYNE-burgz) was a chain of stores in the Eastern United States that specialized in consumer electronics and home appliances. The Reading, Ohio–based company was founded by Ely Steinberg in 1921, and the Steinberg family continued to own the chain until its bankruptcy and liquidation in 1997.

== History ==
Ely Steinberg opened his first store in 1921. The first two stores were located in Cincinnati, Ohio, and focused on musical instruments and electronic audio equipment, such as The Victrola, an early record player, and crystal radio receivers. Notable customers included Powel Crosley Jr., whose WLW-AM later became Cincinnati's premiere radio station.

Steinberg closed the two stores during the Great Depression, but reopened one of them in 1937.

== Growth ==
The chain began to sell a greater variety of products, including stoves, refrigerators, dishwashers, and eventually television sets and desktop computers. By the 1990s, Steinberg's had grown to 22 stores in Ohio, Indiana, Kentucky, and Tennessee.

Facing competition from larger retailers, such as Sun Television and Appliances and Roberd's Grand, Steinberg's abruptly closed its doors on September 22, 1997, in a manner reminiscent of another Cincinnati-based department store, Swallen's. Steinberg's quickly reopened its stores and filed for Chapter 11 bankruptcy the next day in the United States Bankruptcy Court for the Southern District of Ohio.

== See also ==
- Ultimate Electronics
