= QFI =

QFI may refer to:

- QFI (supermarket), a former supermarket chain based in San Francisco
- Qualified Flying Instructor, in the Armed Forces
- QFi, CoaXPress product offered by BitFlow, Inc.
