= Perry Drug Stores =

Defunct American pharmacy chain

- Industry: Retail
- Founded: 1957; 69 years ago
- Founder: Jack A. Robinson
- Defunct: 1995; 31 years ago
- Fate: Acquired by Rite Aid
- Successor: Rite Aid
- Headquarters: Pontiac, Michigan, United States
- Key people: Jack A. Robinson - chief executive officer, founder David Schwartz - chief operating officer, president Jerry Stone - chief financing officer, vice president
- Products: Retail, pharmacy

Perry Drug Stores was an American retail pharmacy chain founded in 1957 in the city of Pontiac, Michigan, United States.

At its peak in the 1980s, Perry operated more than 200 drug stores, primarily in the state of Michigan, as well as 200 Auto Works auto parts stores and fourteen A. L. Price discount health and beauty aids outlets.

In 1995, Perry Drug Stores was bought out by Rite Aid, a pharmacy chain based in Camp Hill, Pennsylvania. The Perry chain, which at the time comprised 224 stores, was the largest acquisition ever made by Rite Aid. In addition, this acquisition brought the Rite Aid name to the Detroit area for the first time.

== History ==
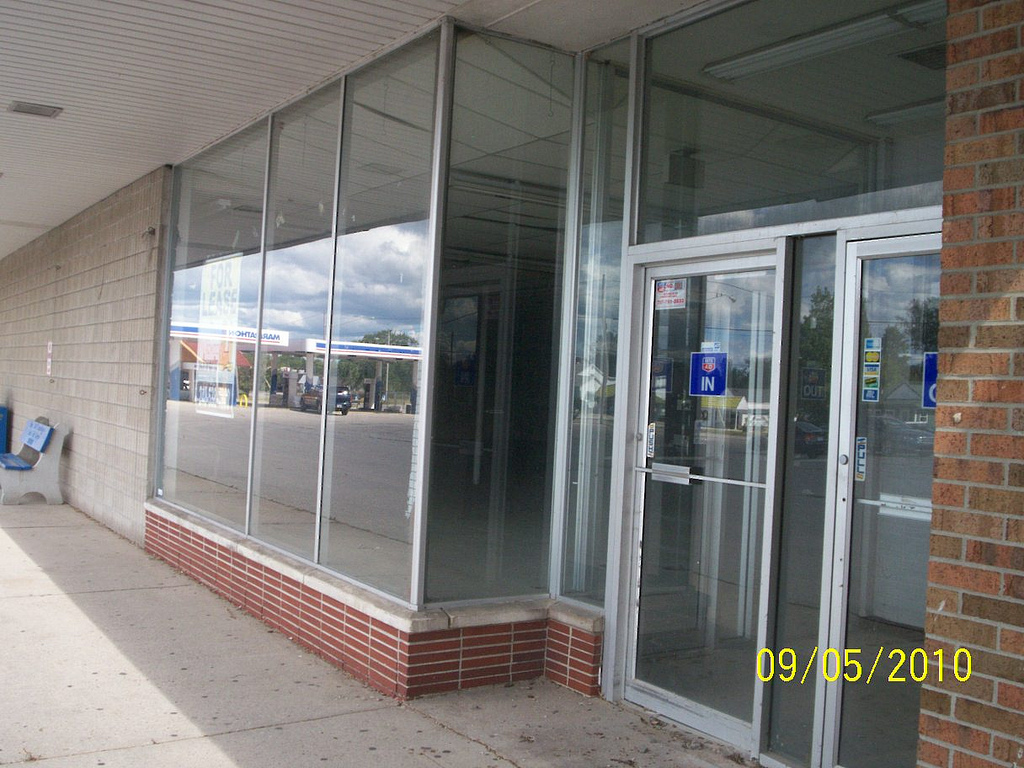
A former Perry Drugs location (previously Cunningham Drug) in Oscoda, Michigan, as seen in September 2010

Founder Jack A. Robinson opened his first Perry Drug Store in 1957 on Perry Street in Pontiac, Michigan. A second store was opened in 1960. The company was listed on the New York Stock Exchange in 1973.

In 1978, a prototype Perry store was opened, featuring an expanded sporting goods line, a home and automotive center, and live pets for sale. Auto Works, an automotive parts retail chain, was introduced in 1982.

In 1982, Cunningham Drug sold off 28 Michigan locations to new owners, who then relaunched them under the Apex Drug name. By 1985, the Apex Drug stores and several other Cunningham locations were sold to Perry, while the Cunningham locations in Florida remained in operation.

In 1989, Perry Drug expanded into the Chicago, Illinois market for the first time. (The chain had previously tried to enter Chicago through a failed acquisition of DeKoven Drugs.) A year later, these 16 stores were sold to businessmen Fred Barney and Bill Cartwright, two veteran businessmen who formed the Chicago operations into Perry Drug Chicago. In 1984, Perry acquired 12 stores in Flint owned by Cook Drug, along with its medical supply business. It also signed a letter of intent to acquire six stores in Grand Rapids operated by Remes Drug Stores. However, Rite Aid ultimately bought these stores. By 1986, the company had 210 drug stores and 230 auto parts stores. However, after suffering losses in the next two years, Perry divested its Auto Works chain in 1988 in order to focus on its drug store business in Michigan, Indiana, Illinois, and Wisconsin.

In 1990, Perry acquired 16 Revco stores, then an additional 24 Revco locations later in the year, all in Michigan. This acquisition made Perry the dominant drugstore chain in the Detroit area and expanded Perry's presence to the Upper Peninsula for the first time. Perry sold off its locations in Indiana and Wisconsin, as well as its A. L. Price discount stores. By the end of the year, the chain announced several cost cutting initiatives, including a 10% reduction in its administrative staff and the sale of its unprofitable wholesale medical and surgical supply business.

After its out-of-state operations were sold, Perry continued to expand its presence within Michigan. Many locations were remodeled to the chain's "store of the '90s" format; in addition, an online computer system called PerryLink was implemented at all stores, allowing for customers to have their prescriptions filled at any location. During this era, a Vice President was visiting a store in Warren when he heard an ad for Arbor Drugs (main competitor) over the radio that was broadcasting in the stores. He was outraged, naturally. About a week later, Perry implemented the "Perry Radio Network," a Point of Purchase in-store broadcasting system tailored to the Perry brand. [62]

In 1992, Arbor Drugs, Perry's chief rival in Michigan, surpassed its market share in Detroit. By 1993, Perry Drug Chicago's 14 locations were acquired by their supplier and wholesaler, McKesson, and were either sold or liquidated.

=== Sale to Rite Aid ===
Rite Aid, a drugstore chain based in Camp Hill, Pennsylvania, acquired twenty-five locations from Hook's Drug Stores in 1994, subsequently selling nine of the locations to Perry. Just weeks later, Rite Aid put in a tender offer to acquire all 224 of Perry Drug Stores' locations, including the former Hook's Drugs locations Robinson agreed to stay on for a year as president of Rite Aid Michigan. The offer was completed by January 1995, at which point Rite Aid owned 94.5% of Perry stock. Perry's ultimate selling price of $11 per share was said to be low by industry analysts at the time, the result of rapid diversification. It was the largest acquisition made by Rite Aid at the time. The deal also tripled the chain's presence in Michigan and brought Rite Aid to the Detroit area, where it previously had no stores.

Perry Drug Stores, Inc. remained an active subsidiary of Rite Aid (owning stores held by the company at its closure), as shown in the company's October 2023 Chapter 11 bankruptcy filings.

On May 5, 2025, Rite Aid filed for Chapter 11 bankruptcy for the second time in two years, listing assets and liabilities between $1 billion and $10 billion. Rite Aid will sell all of its assets as part of its procedure, as it overcomes financial challenges such as debt, increased competition, and inflation, including Perry Drug Stores.

== Other operations ==
In addition to the drugstore chain, Perry owned two other specialty chains: Auto Works and A.L. Price.

=== Auto Works ===
Unlike other drug stores, Perry diversified by carry non-traditional items such as automotive parts like brakes, shocks, exhaust systems, and carburetors in their drug stores as early as 1975. By 1978, Perry had 15 of its 56 stores, all in lower Michigan, carrying auto parts.

A few years later, Perry decided to open standalone auto part stores called Auto Works. By March 1983, three stores had been opened in Michigan and Chicago, with plans to open 20 more. Perry's entry into the auto parts retailing space kicked off similar efforts from Rite Aid, Dart Drug, and Hook's.

In July 1983, Perry signed a letter of intent to acquire Indianapolis-based Fleenor's Inc. with its chain of 50 auto part stores in Indiana, Ohio, and Kentucky. After the acquisition was finalized, the Fleenor Auto Supply stores were rebranded FAS Auto Works. In 1984, Perry acquired 25 stores in the St. Louis area, expanding the company into Missouri for the first time. The acquisition included the 22-store Jack Lampert-Singer Super Auto Parts chain and three stores operated by Pappy's Discount Auto Stores. In October, Perry acquired Corvair Auto Parts with its chain of 46 auto part stores in Indiana, Ohio, Kentucky, and West Virginia. This transaction brought its store total to 150, which was more than the number of drug stores it owned.

By May 1985, all FAS Auto Works and Corvair Auto Works stores were rebrand to just Auto Works. However, for the first time in company history, Perry lost money in 1987, reporting $7.9 million in losses on sales of $726 million. Auto Works proved to be a bigger strain on resources than anticipated, and it would require even more investment to be profitable. The company had also taken on a heavy debt load to build the Auto Works chain and overpaid on acquisitions.

Perry sold its Auto works division with its 252 stores in Michigan, Illinois, Indiana, Wisconsin, Kentucky, Missouri and West Virginia to Northern Automotive in Northern Automotive for $51 million in February 1988.

After five years of ownership, Northern Automotive failed to turn the ailing chain around and subsequently sold Auto Works' 159 retail stores in Illinois, Indiana, Kentucky, Michigan, Missouri, Ohio and West Virginia to Hahn Automotive Warehouse in November 1993 for $13 million in cash.

Hahn finally closed Auto Works with its 53 stores in August 1997 after filing for Chapter 11 bankruptcy.

=== A.L. Price ===
A.L. Price was a deep-discount health and beauty aids retailer with sixteen locations in the Detroit area that was started in 1983.

A.L. Price had 16 stores at the beginning of 1990. In April 1990, Perry Drug Stores announced that it has plans to sell off 14 of its 16 A. L. Price locations for $14.8 million and convert the remaining two into Perry Drug stores, as part of a decision to focus entirely on the drugstore chain itself. In March 1993, the chain, under new management, filed for Chapter 11 bankruptcy. At the time of the filing, A.L. Price had 12 stores. As one of the creditors, Perry initially announced that it plans to buy all 12 stores back for $2 million plus inventory, but latter change the number to 11 and increase the purchase price to $10.8 million

By May 1994, Perry closed all of the re-purchased A.L. Price stores, except for three. Perry had plans of converting one of the stores into a Perry store, merging the inventory of the second store into a nearby existing Perry store, and no announced plans for the remaining store. The remaining three stores were finally closed by the end of 1994 with plans of converting two of the stores into drive-through pharmacies.
