= Payless Cashways =

American building materials retailer

Payless Cashways, Inc.
- Trade name: Payless Cashways Building Materials; Furrow Building Materials; Lumberjack Building Materials; Hugh M. Woods Building Materials; Knox Lumber; Somerville Lumber; Contractor Supply
- Company type: Public
- Traded as: NYSE: PCS
- Industry: Retail
- Founded: 1930; 96 years ago
- Founder: Sanford Furrow
- Defunct: September 10, 2001; 24 years ago
- Fate: Liquidated
- Headquarters: Kansas City, Missouri, United States
- Products: Building materials and home improvement products

Payless Cashways was a building materials retailer based in Kansas City, United States. The company primarily operated during the 1980s and 1990s, and is considered among the first national chains to implement the DIY strategy. The company experienced financial difficulties during the late 1980s.

Payless Cashways differed from modern home improvement retailers in that they utilized a fully functional outdoor lumber yard. Customers would purchase materials inside the store and upon payment, would drive their vehicle into the lumber yard area and give their order ticket to an attendant. Prior to filing for bankruptcy protection, Payless Cashways operated 194 stores across 22 states.

== History ==
Sanford "Sam" Furrow founded his business in 1930 with the purchase of a lumberyard in Pocahontas, Iowa that was in default on its loans, along with his sons and business partner John Evans. He then bought two other lumberyards in the same financial position. The original yard was named Kiefer-Wolfe Lumber Company, which was soon renamed Pocahontas Lumber Store. The company grew, and Sam Furrow and John Evans split the company. Sam and his sons began operating on "cash-and-carry", able to offer lower prices than when taking on the risk of contractors buying on credit. The company eventually adopted the Payless Cashways name, but new locations were added using Furrow's due to trademark issues in Texas, Oregon, Missouri, Kansas, Oklahoma, California, and Indiana. (For example, in Indiana, Payless was a grocery chain). By 1981, the company was the 5th largest in the industry.

In 1983, Payless Cashways purchased the Sacramento, California–based Lumberjack Stores Inc for $26.3 million (~$69.4 million in 2024). In the following year, Payless Cashways purchased the Somerville, Massachusetts–based Somerville Lumber & Supply Company for $12 million in stock. In 1986, Payless Cashways purchased the Saint Paul, Minnesota–based Knox Lumber Company for an undisclosed amount.

Payless Cashways was taken private in 1988, but didn't see any profits the five years it was private.

Payless Cashways faced their first major challenge in 1988, when they were the target of a leveraged buyout led by Asher Edelman and Sutherland Lumber. The company also received a takeover bid from The Ward White Group, a British company which operated a similarly named retailer in Britain. In response to the takeover attempts, Payless Cashways repurchased the company's 33.6 million outstanding shares at $27 per share, totaling $909 million. The Payless Cashways stock buyback left them saddled with massive debt that stopped their expansion. The retailer's stagnation caused them to be left behind by the big box home centers such as Builders Square, HomeBase, and later the emerging Menards, Home Depot and Lowe's chains. The company struggled through the nineties with moderate successes and recurrent failures and never regained the momentum of their first wave of expansion. In July 1997, Payless Cashways filed for Chapter 11 bankruptcy protection. The last straw for Payless Cashways was the burst of the dot com bubble that left many banks unwilling to help the company continue its operations. The company was ordered to be liquidated by the United States bankruptcy court of Western Missouri on September 10, 2001, by coincidence the day before the September 11 attacks.

== Names Operated Under ==
Payless Cashways operated stores under a variety of banners, usually with one banner per given area. They were:

- Payless Cashways
- Furrow
- Lumberjack
- Hugh M. Woods
- Knox Lumber
- Somerville Lumber
- Contractor Supply
- PCI Builders Resource
- PCIBuildStreet.com

== See also ==
- List of defunct retailers of the United States
