= James Emmot Caldwell =

James Emott Caldwell (August 15, 1813 – September 24, 1881) was an American jeweler who founded J.E. Caldwell & Co. in 1839. While best known as a major fine jewelry institution of Philadelphia, over the years since its inception, the firm has also been known for its silver, china, crystal, and even stationery.

== Early life ==
Caldwell as born on August 15, 1813, in Poughkeepsie, New York. In his school days, he was a classmate of Theodore Cuyler, Benson J. Lossing, Jackson S. Schultz, the Vassar brothers, who afterwards won distinction, and who remained his personal friends through life. At the age of 14 in 1827, he started to learn the art of silver making under the supervision of his Master Peter Perret Hayes. Mr. Caldwell was the youngest apprentice in the establishment at that time, while the oldest was Joseph T. Bailey of Bailey Banks & Biddle, between whom there sprang up an intimacy that ripened into warm friendship. In 1835 after becoming a master silversmith, he moved to New York City as an apprentice in watch-making with Samuel Ward Benedict in his downtown Wall Street shop.

== Personal life ==
Caldwell married Sarah Caroline Butler on 1 September 1842 in Philadelphia, Pennsylvania. They had six children: three sons, James Albert Caldwell born on 9 November 1844, Richard Nelson Caldwell born on 24 February 1854, Clarence Edmund Caldwell born on 18 October 1857 and three daughters: Laura Emott Caldwell(Bulkley), Caroline Elizabeth Caldwell(Brewster), and Bellinda Caldwell(Claxton). James Emott Caldwell died on Saturday 24 September 1881, at his residence in Germantown.

== Career ==
In 1836 he moved to Philadelphia and landed his first job, to work with Samuel Hildeburn a wholesale jewelry house of Market Street. A short time after he was hired by John Farr to work as a watch maker for the watch importer and jewelry manufacturer John C. Farr & Co at No. 112 Chestnut Street. He opened his first retail store in 1839 at No. 136 Chestnut Street. During that time in 1841, Caldwell partnered with James M. Bennett and founded "Bennett & Caldwell" at No. 140 Chestnut Street across the street from his store where he remained until 1858. Upon Bennett's death, John C. Farr, one of his first employers, became associated with Caldwell, and the firm became J.E. Caldwell & Co.
