= LaVerdiere's =

Defunct American pharmacy chain serving Northern New England

LaVerdiere's Drug Stores
- Type: Private
- Industry: Retail
- Founded: 1922; 104 years ago in Waterville, Maine
- Founder: Evariste LaVerdiere
- Defunct: 1994; 32 years ago
- Fate: Acquisition and takeover by Rite Aid; all of the stores were converted into Rite Aid stores
- Successor: Rite Aid
- Headquarters: Waterville, Maine, United States
- Number of locations: 72 at acquisition and takeover
- Area served: Maine; New Hampshire; Vermont
- Key people: Reginald LaVerdiere, president
- Products: Pharmacy

LaVerdiere's Super Drug Stores (often called LaVerdiere's) was a pharmacy chain based in Waterville, Maine. At its peak, the company operated more than 70 stores in small towns throughout Maine, New Hampshire, and Vermont. Aside from the pharmacy, the stores sold general items, as well as toys and Halloween and Christmas decorations. In the 1980s, some LaVerdiere's locations featured an arcade, called Action Family Arcade. LaVerdiere's operated 42 Action Family Arcades in the 1980s.

In 1994, Rite Aid purchased the company as part of its expansion into Northern New England. Company president Stephen LaVerdiere cited repeal of the state's blue laws as a factor making it more difficult to compete with national chains:

Our stores were specifically designed to be 5,000 sq. ft. so that we would be able to remain open on Sunday. Any store larger than that was not permitted to stay open on Sunday. In that way, we were able to bring in business seven days a week. When that law was repealed, we found ourselves competing on Sunday with mass-merchandisers as well as big supermarkets.

Evariste LaVerdiere founded the company on Main Street in Waterville, Maine in 1922 with a news stand which grew into a soda fountain and later a drug store. Rite Aid's successor in Maine, Walgreens, operate in many of the former LaVerdiere's locations into the mid 2020s.

In 2023, Rite Aid, the successor to LaVerdiere's, filed for Chapter 11 bankruptcy. On May 5, 2025, Rite Aid filed for Chapter 11 bankruptcy for the second time in 2 years, listing assets and liabilities between $1 billion and $10 billion, blaming financial challenges such as debt, increased competition, and inflation.

== In pop culture ==
LaVerdiere's and its somewhat infamous Halloween goods aisle, were described in some detail in Stephen King's novella The Sun Dog:

The LaVerdiere's Super Drug Store was really more of a jumped-up five-and-dime than anything else… [It] carried everything the old Ben Franklin had carried, but the goods were bathed in the pitiless light of Maxi-Glo fluorescent bars which gave every bit of stock its own hectic, feverish shimmer. There was an aisle of notions, two aisles of first-aid supplies, and nostrums, an aisle of video and audio tapes (both blank and pre-recorded). There was a long rack of magazines giving way to paperback books, a display of lighters under one digital cash-register and a display of watches under another (a third register was hidden in the dark corner where the pharmacist lurked in his lonely shadows). Halloween candy had taken over most of the toy aisle (the toys would not only come back after Halloween but eventually take over two whole aisles as the days slid remorselessly down toward Christmas).

== See also ==
- List of defunct retailers of the United States
