= ABCO Foods =

Former chain of grocery stores in Arizona

ABCO Foods was a chain of grocery stores in Phoenix and Tucson, Arizona for over 15 years, formed from a 1984 spin-off sale by the Alpha Beta division of American Stores. The Arizona regional management secured private financing to purchase the Arizona stores (most Alpha Beta locations were in California). Part of the sale agreement included a 5-year term to continue the use of the Alpha Beta brand in Arizona.

The name "ABCO Markets" came about when the Alpha Beta branding agreement expired. The new name was derived from Alpha Beta's initials. The agreement also included a non-compete clause: American Stores could not reenter Arizona for a specified period of time. This agreement later allowed ABCO the first right of refusal when American Stores elected to sell the Arizona locations of Lucky supermarkets.

The company was under the head of Edward Hill before being sold to its supplier, Fleming Companies, Inc. in 1996. Under Fleming's leadership, ABCO changed its name to "ABCO Foods Desert Market" and converted all of its stores to a Southwestern-style desert exterior and interior design format, featuring facades of adobe and a very prominent pink color on its check stands. In 1997, ABCO Foods applied for licenses to sell liquor at nine Tucson locations.

When Fleming decided to pull out of the retail category, ABCO was one of the first chains put on the block. The result was the loss of these markets, consisting of 56 stores at the time of its closure. The last ABCO store closed in the summer of 2001. The stores were sold separately to many different companies, including Safeway Inc., Bashas', Albertsons, and many independent grocers operating as IGA stores. Over the past few years, many of these stores have, in turn, changed hands from their original buyers. Fleming Companies announced in April 2003 that it had filed for reorganization under Chapter 11 bankruptcy.
