= Gemco =

Defunct American corporation

- Industry: Retail
- Founded: 1959
- Defunct: 1986
- Fate: Liquidation
- Successor: Target
- Headquarters: Buena Park, California
- Products: groceries, clothing, footwear, housewares, sporting goods, hardware, toys, electronics
- Parent: Lucky Stores

Gemco was an American chain of membership department stores that was owned by San Leandro-based Lucky Stores, a California supermarket company which eventually became part of Albertsons. Gemco operated from 1959 until closing in late 1986. A number of the west coast stores leases were sold to Dayton Hudson, the parent company of Target, which fueled their entry into California. Gemco had a version called Memco, also owned by Lucky Stores, that operated stores in the Chicago, Illinois, and Washington, D.C., areas.

== History ==
Gemco was established in Anaheim, California, in October 1959. A year later, the company was purchased by Lucky Stores, which added the supermarket element and expanded Gemco into a chain. Business and profitability continued to be healthy for over 20 years, until a series of unsuccessful leveraged takeover attempts from other companies were made on its parent company, Lucky Stores. Lucky, to avoid such hostile takeover attempts, eventually decided it was best to liquidate Gemco entirely. This liquidation occurred from September 1986 into November 1986 by the liquidation agency of Sam Nassi Company. Target opened stores in most of the former Gemco locations by the fall of 1987, having remodeled many of Gemco's former prime business locations into Target's bright red-and-white trade dress.

=== Name, colors and logo ===
"GEMCO" never was an acronym, despite rumors to the contrary (e.g., that it stood for such terms as "Government Employees' Merchandising Company"). The letters were simply an easily pronounced and remembered name. Brown (with tan accents) was Gemco's original main exterior background color, and the letters "GEMCO" were originally in red. Throughout the late 1960s and 1970s, the logo consisted of translucent, serifed capital letters on a horizontal dark blue oval. An early 1980s redesign changed the chain's main exterior background color to blue (with light blue accenting), and its letter coloring in its logo to white (adding a yellow diamond on top of the "M").

=== Offerings and innovations ===
An early example of what would become a hypermarket, Gemco offered one-stop shopping for everything from garden supplies to groceries, and regular department store offerings as well. Its concessionaires included gasoline (located outside and away from the front entrance) and jewelry. One innovation the store offered — found nowhere else at the time — was the storing and delivery of already purchased groceries when the member was finished shopping the rest of the store. A numbered plastic card was placed on the cart(s) and its match was given to the customer. When the member was done shopping and ready to leave the premises, the member merely needed to drive to the side of the store where the plastic card was given to the security guard. The guard would call for a courtesy clerk to deliver the groceries, and the clerk would load them into the member's vehicle. Niceties such as this won many new members to Gemco, and created repeat business.

Gemco was a preferred employer in many of the locations in which it did business. Unlike many other "discount" chains such as Payless, Gemco employed union members of the UFCW (United Food and Commercial Workers).

Gemco also offered a credit department to help increase sales. It was particularly busy each year during the Christmas shopping period.

On a trial basis, a few Gemco stores offered free babysitting while an adult was shopping in the store. The adult would drop off the child in the designated area of the store and would be given a ticket with a number on it. When done shopping they would give the cashier the ticket, who in return called the babysitting dept and a clerk would bring the child out to the parent. The parent could also pick the child up directly as well. After about one year of trial Gemco ceased operation of this trial. California law required a caregiver in a commercial operation to be licensed and insured as a daycare.

Gemco also started the Gemco Charitable and Scholarship Foundation, a California corporation, in November 1959. The foundation held annual scholarship competitions in the areas where Gemco had stores. Each competition placed competitors, who were high school seniors selected by their schools, in a panel discussion format with judges questioning them about their views on discussion topics and requiring that they defend their positions. Several rounds of discussions would be judged to determine the winners. Winners were awarded one-time scholarships of up to $1,500.00 based on the judges' scoring of their performance, with lesser amounts being awarded to runners-up. The foundation's corporate rights have been suspended in California.

Gemco members received a monthly catalog, the Gemco Courier, containing Saturday Evening Post-inspired cover art.

=== Memco ===
The East Coast stores, located in the Washington, D.C., area, were called Memco instead of Gemco, to avoid confusion with an already existing area chain called GEM. Memco stores had a blue color scheme on its walls and signage. Memco honored Gemco membership cards, and vice versa. Sometimes when an advertisement photo showed a membership card, the first letter in the logo was concealed, so the same picture could be used in both Gemco and Memco ads.

Memco entered the Washington, D.C., market on August 6, 1970 with the opening of two 100,000-square-foot (9,300 m^{2}) stores on Little River Turnpike at Braddock Road in Annandale, Virginia, and on Allentown Road in Camp Springs, Maryland. When the chain announced its exit from the market in December 1982, there were 13 stores (including two in Richmond, Virginia, one in Reston, Virginia, and two in the Baltimore area), Columbia, Maryland, and Greenbelt, Maryland, stores had opened just two months earlier, and a 14th store under construction in Burke, Virginia, a suburb of Washington, D.C. The closings idled 1,200 retail workers. All of these locations would be liquidated by March 1983, and subsequently converted to Bradlees, to be open by mid-year. Several of the former locations are currently open as Home Depot outlets (such as the location on Fairfax Circle in Fairfax, Virginia) or were occupied by Kmart before closing.

Memco also had stores in the suburbs of Chicago, Illinois, which opened in Niles and Arlington Heights in August 1972 and in Lombard in August 1973. These three stores were not very successful and were converted into Eagle Family Centers in October 1977. Buildings for two of these stores were later occupied by the Roundy's-owned Pick 'n Save discount warehouse stores in May 1982.

Memco also had a presence in North Carolina for less than two years. The first in the state opened in the North Point area of Winston-Salem on April 22, 1980. The second, located on High Point Road in Greensboro, opened on October 28th. Lucky Stores would announce the imminent closure and liquidation of these locations on December 29, 1981, which while due to rising competition, was cited as a means for them to concentrate on Memco's Baltimore and Richmond-based operations. Both stores would be liquidated by January 31, 1982.

== Fictitious town ==
The fictitious town of Gemco, California, is located in Van Nuys, California, near Woodman Avenue and Saticoy Street. It appeared on a map in the 1980s, possibly as a copyright trap, and is now in many mapping databases. It actually was the shorthand name used by the Southern Pacific Railroad to refer to the General Motors Van Nuys Assembly plant.
