= Petrini's =

Defunct American grocery chain

- Company type: Privately held company
- Industry: Retail (Grocery)
- Founded: 1935
- Founder: Frank Petrini
- Defunct: 1996
- Headquarters: San Francisco, United States of America
- Products: Groceries

Petrini's Marketplace was an Italian-American restaurant and grocery chain founded in San Francisco in 1935.

== History ==
The founder of Petrini's, Frank Petrini, began working in Italy at the age of 12 and was trained as a butcher at the age of 14. In 1935, he established a butcher shop at the intersection of 7th and Clement, and this later became Petrini's first location.

Arthur Baldocchi partnered with Petrini to open the Petrini Plaza Supermarket near the Fulton and Masonic streets in San Francisco.

The Petrini family sold the chain in 1996. The Stonestown location continued to operate under the name Petrini's until 1996.

== Operation ==
The San Francisco Examiner reported that Frank Petrini selected the cows that were going to be slaughtered for sale in his markets himself and rejected much of the bovine meat that was considered prime by other markets.

== See also ==
- QFI (supermarket)
- List of butcher shops
