= Scotty's Builders Supply =

Defunct American home improvement retailer

- The Final Logo Used By The Company Before Their Bankruptcy
- Formerly: Home Builders Supply; Scotty's Home Builder Supply
- Type: Private
- Industry: Home Improvement
- Founded: 1924
- Founder: Evanda Hugh Sweet
- Defunct: 2005
- Fate: Bankruptcy
- Headquarters: Winter Haven, Florida
- Number of locations: 162 stores (1990’s)
- Area served: Florida & Georgia
- Products: Hardware
- Number of employees: 6,000 (1990’s)
- Website: Official website (archived)

Scotty's Builders Supply was an American retailer of home improvement and construction products and services. The company that at its peak operated about 150 stores, closed in 2005.

The company was also known as Scotty's Hardware and Scotty's Home Builders.

== History ==
The company has its beginnings in the 1920s Florida land boom when new residents poured into the state to build houses, hotels, and other businesses. A young Georgia farmer working in Winter Haven recognized the demand for building materials and in 1924 opened "Home Builders Supply" in Winter Haven.

Evanda Hugh Sweet, a local farmer and father of James Sweet, started with one store in 1924, and in 1925, it became incorporated; from that point it grew to a total of 162 stores.

Scotty's was instrumental in helping supply building materials to the early real estate booms of Florida. Scotty's, overcome by the very competitive home improvement market, closed all the stores in 2005.

Private investment company Oak Point Partners acquired the remnant assets, consisting of any known and unknown assets that weren't previously administered, from the Scott Acquisition Corp., et al., Bankruptcy Estates on September 17, 2008.

== James W. Sweet ==
James (Jim) Sweet built Scotty's to a chain of more than 100 stores (162 at its peak) and $500 million in sales during a 40-year career there. Scotty’s employed more than 5,500 people during his tenure. He was a 15-year member of the Florida Council of 100 business development group. He was also a graduate of Winter Haven High School.

He died on Wednesday, October 28, 2009, at age 91 in Winter Haven, Florida.

== Name changes ==
- 1924 through 1967 - Home Builders Supply, Inc
- 1968 through 1972 - Scotty's Home Builders Supply, Inc
- 1973 through 2005 - Scotty's, Inc.

== The GIB Group ==
In the 1980s, the GIB Group helped Scotty's move to a new direction with a much needed influx of resources. In the 1990s, James Sweet sold all his stock and GIB became the new owners of the home improvement chain.

GIB also had interest in other home improvement retailers in the US, such as Handy Andy Home Improvement Center.

== Delivery service ==
Scotty's contractor and homeowner delivery service was one its major strengths.

They had many types of trucks in their fleet:

1. Flatbed lift
2. Shingle boom
3. Drywall
4. Box

== Stock-car racing sponsor ==
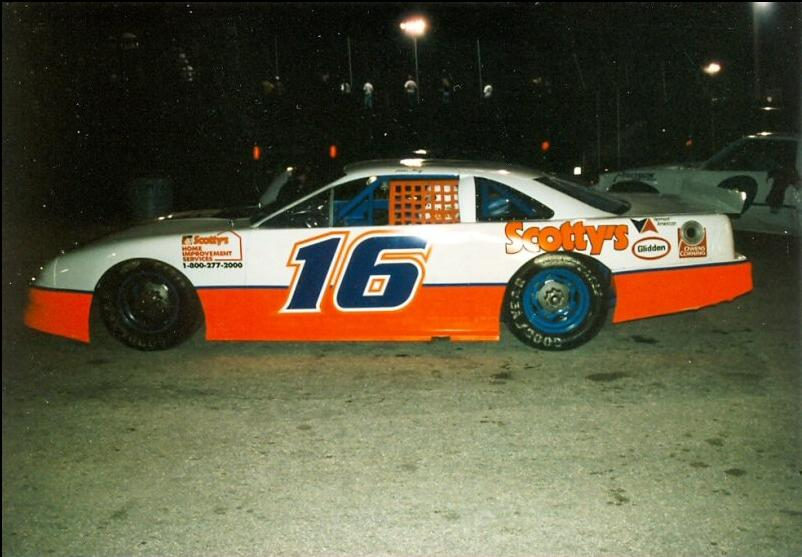
#16 Scotty's Car

In the late 1980s, Scotty's was also sponsor to Eddie King and his #16 car on the Florida late model circuit.
