= K&B =

American drugstore chain (1905–1997)

- Type: Pharmacy
- Industry: Retail
- Founded: 1905
- Defunct: 1997
- Fate: Acquired by Rite Aid
- Headquarters: New Orleans, Louisiana
- Products: Pharmacy, Liquor, Cosmetics, Health and Beauty Aids, General Merchandise, Snacks, 1 Hour Photo
- Website: None

K&B (initialism of Katz & Besthoff) was a drug store chain headquartered in New Orleans. Founded in 1905, it expanded to have stores in the United States Gulf Coast region until it was purchased by Rite Aid in 1997.

Gustave Katz partnered with Sydney J. Besthoff at 732 Canal Street, New Orleans in 1905, and continually expanded through the 20th century to become a regional chain. It was well known for its unique purple color, with everything in the store (signs, cash registers, employee uniforms, etc.) being "K&B Purple". This color became well known as a descriptive term in the local lexicon - as one might describe something as "forest green", New Orleanians still describe this particular shade of purple as "K&B purple."

The Katz & Besthoff (K&B) drugstore chain offered a wide range of private label items. This lineup included household goods, private-label liquor and signature ice creams. The chain also operated an independent credit card program with strict approval requirements.

K&B's corporate headquarters, K&B Plaza were located at Lee Circle in the New Orleans Central Business District. The building built in the mid 1960s, was originally designed by Skidmore, Owings, & Merrill, and owned and occupied by the John Hancock Insurance Company. Featured on the raised terrazzo plaza that surrounded the building is a large marble column topped with a marble crescent fountain called the "Mississippi Fountain" (see: http://www.noguchi.org/noguchi/works/mississippi-fountain), made by Isamu Noguchi. In the mid-seventies, K&B bought the building from John Hancock. The building is still known as K&B Plaza despite the fact that K&B sold its assets to Rite Aid in 1997, however the K&B family still own and occupy office space there on the seventh (top) floor from which the family, including two of Sydney's daughters, Valerie and Jane, manage their significant real estate business. The building is a showcase for some of Sydney's art collection and is open to the public. The older headquarters and warehouse at 900 Camp Street was donated by K&B to become the headquarters of New Orleans' Contemporary Arts Center at the start of the 1980s. After Rite Aid's rebranding of the chain, items from the stores were sold to the public with proceeds benefiting local charities.

Sydney Besthoff III, the grandson of the drugstore's founder, and his wife, Walda are well-known local philanthropists and collectors of museum-quality works of art. Their collection includes works by significant contemporary sculptors. The Sydney and Walda Besthoff Sculpture Garden at the New Orleans Museum of Art in City Park was created from their specifications and donations.

In 2023, Rite Aid filed for Chapter 11 bankruptcy. Despite K&B shutting down 26 years prior to Rite Aid's bankruptcy filing, K&B was still listed in the filing.

On May 5, 2025, Rite Aid filed for Chapter 11 bankruptcy for the second time in 2 years, listing assets and liabilities between $1 billion and $10 billion. Rite Aid will sell all of its assets as part of its procedure, as it overcomes financial challenges such as debt, increased competition, and inflation, including K&B.

== Bibliography ==
- K&B: "Only the Best," by John S. Epstein, 2010. ISBN 978-1-4528-8835-4
- K&B Drug Stores, by John S. Epstein, 2011. ISBN 978-0-7385-8227-6
