= Kleinhans =

The Kleinhans Company
- Industry: Retail
- Founded: 1893
- Defunct: 1992
- Fate: Liquidation
- Headquarters: Buffalo, New York
- Products: Men's clothing
- Parent: Hartmarx

Kleinhans, formally The Kleinhans Company, was a high-end men's clothing store located in Buffalo, New York. Edward Kleinhans and his brother Horace opened the store in 1893, and shortly after located in the Brisbane Building at Main and Clinton Streets on Lafayette Square in Downtown Buffalo. The store would eventually grow to be 54,000 square feet (5,000 m^{2}), and was said to be the largest men's clothing store in the country. Edward Kleinhans died in 1934, and left his estate to the city to build the Kleinhans Music Hall. Hart Schaffner & Marx (later Hartmarx) purchased the company in 1967 and operated the chain until it closed December 30, 1992.
