= J.E. Caldwell & Co. =

Major jewellery retailer

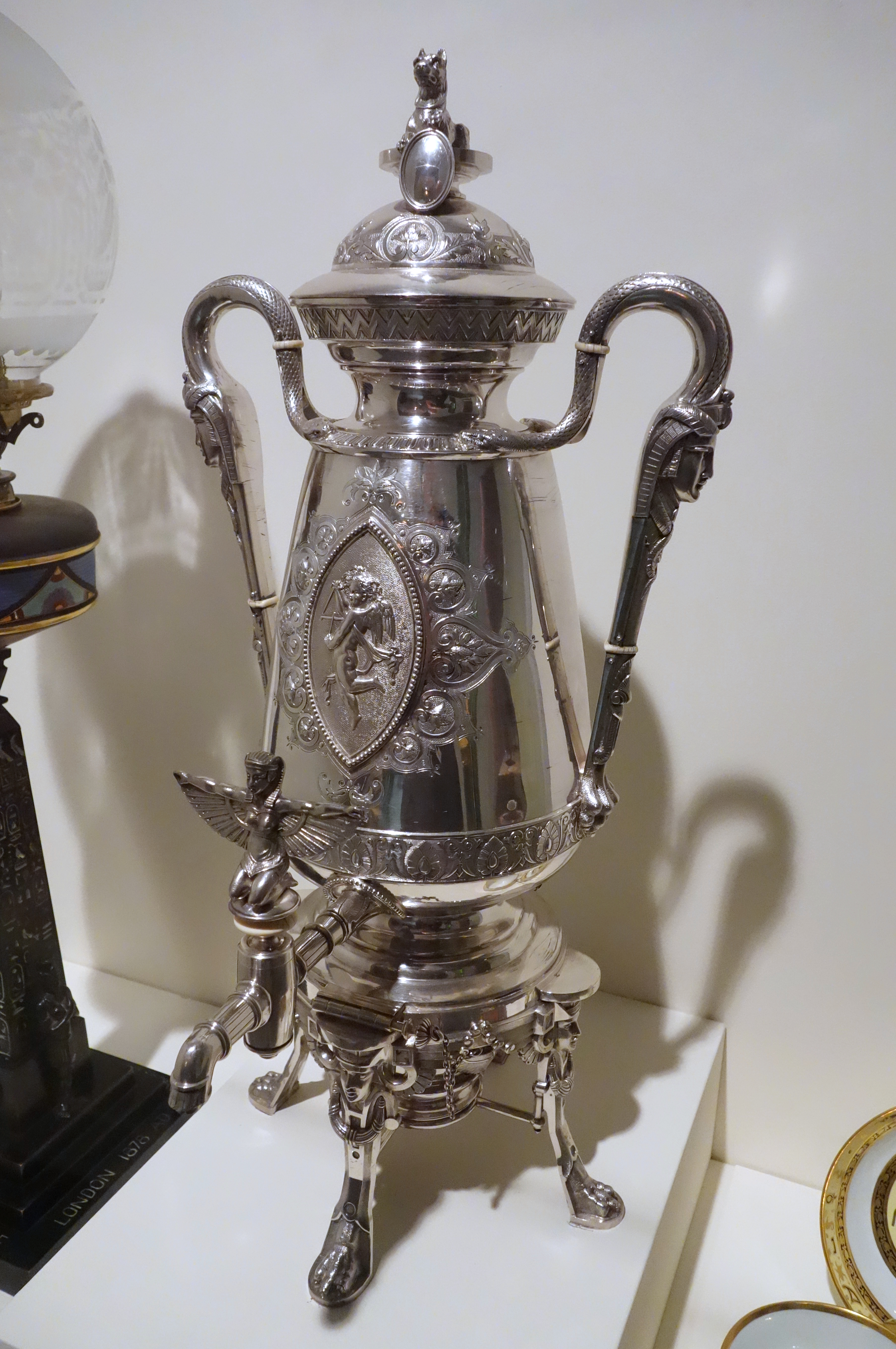
Urn with Egyptian figures, part of a six-piece tea and coffee service, J.E. Caldwell & Company, Philadelphia, c. 1875

J.E. Caldwell & Co. was a major jewelry retailer and one-time silversmith in Philadelphia, Pennsylvania.

The company was founded at 163 Chestnut Street, Philadelphia, by watchmaker James Emmot Caldwell in 1839. In 1843 the firm became the partnership of Bennett & Caldwell, then in 1848 was renamed J.E. Caldwell & Co. It produced its own silverware until the early 1850s, but subsequently the word "manufacturer" disappeared from its advertising. The firm experienced rapid growth from the start, and repeated enlargements and removals were made necessary from time to time to gain the greater facilities demanded. The Marble Building located at 822 Chestnut Street was inaugurated in December 1858. Before its ten-year lease expired, the company moved in 1867 to its main location, 902 Chestnut Street. That store was destroyed during a fire in 1869. Caldwell went to work, and, before the smoke lifted from the ruins of the destroyed building, he had the present palatial structure contracted for.

J.E. Caldwell & Co. acquired a national reputation through its silver services presented to battleships and cruisers of the US Navy. It exhibited at The Centennial Exposition in 1876, representing the American Jewelry Maker. By the late 19th century richly decorated table china by Spode and Mintons was being produced bearing underglaze backstamps indicating that they were made expressly for J.E. Caldwell & Co., Philadelphia.

After Caldwell's death in 1881, his son James Albert Caldwell became head of the company. In 1952 Austïon Homer became president, and the following year began an ambitious store expansion program. After a decline in fortune, however, Caldwell & Co. was purchased by Henry Birks & Sons of Montreal, and then in August 1992 acquired by Carlyle & Co. of Greensboro, North Carolina. Its flagship Philadelphia store at 1339 Chestnut Street closed in 2003, followed by the remaining branches in 2009. As of 2019 the J. E. Caldwell name had been revived with a single store on Jewelers' Row in Philadelphia. but their web site went offline in 2022.
