= Arbor Drugs =

- Industry: Drug store
- Founded: 1963
- Founders: Bruno Manni & Eugene Applebaum
- Defunct: 1998
- Fate: Purchased by CVS Corporation
- Headquarters: Troy, Michigan
- Number of locations: 207 (1998)
- Area served: Southeast Michigan

Arbor Drugs was a chain of drug stores based in Troy, Michigan. At its height, it was the 8th largest regional drug store in the United States.

Arbor Drugs was known for its financial success, steady expansion, and pharmacy services. When many of its competitors attempted to diversify during the 1970s and '80s, Arbor focused on filling prescriptions.

== History ==
In 1963, Eugene Applebaum opened Civic Drugs on Michigan Avenue and Greenfield Road in Dearborn, Michigan. He continued to acquire five more drug stores during the 1970s. Arbor Drugs was founded in 1974, when Applebaum and Bruno Manni, who founded and established 11 brick and mortar Sentry Drug stores, incorporated these stores under the name, which was picked for Ann Arbor, Michigan. In 1979, the chain became one of the first to offer computerized prescriptions, and the chain's records were linked by 1989.

In 1981, Arbor acquired 11 former Cunningham Drug locations, giving the chain 30 stores. Applebaum attempted to expand geographically by opening three stores in the Carolinas, but they soon closed. 1986 it went public opening on NASDAQ under the stock symbol ARBR. At the time, the chain had 52 stores and generated $152 million in sales.

During a five-year span in the early 1990s, Arbor remodeled 70% of its stores and invested $10 million in advanced pharmacy systems. During this time, it expanded into Ecorse and Hamtramck. By 1992, Arbor posted $500 million in total sales.

In July 1993, Arbor Drugs was accused of overcharging Blue Cross and Blue Shield Association by at least $17 million in prescriptions since 1988. The two sides later settled out of court for $15 million. However, only one year later, Arbor was charged with intentionally falsifying and inflating Medicaid reimbursement claims. The company paid $7 million to the government to settle the allegations. Eventually, all charges, both criminal and civil, were dropped.

By 1994, the chain had 154 stores and the company had $618 million in sales. It bought out rival M&R that year. Between 1996 and 1997, Arbor opened 30 new stores.

By 1997, pharmacy accounted for 51% of the company's total sales. By 1998, the drug store chain was the nation's eighth largest, holding a 48% market share in Detroit and 45% in Ann Arbor. It had 207 locations throughout southeastern Michigan at the time. In 1997, revenues totaled $962.8 million (~$1.74 billion in 2024).

CVS Corporation announced on February 9, 1998, that it would be purchasing Arbor Drugs in a transaction estimated at $1.48 billion (~$2.65 billion in 2024), and creating the largest chain drug retailer in the process. The deal was finalized two months later. Although most Arbor Drug locations were converted to CVS, several of these stores were later shuttered by the CVS Corporation.

Following the sale, Applebaum joined the CVS Board of Directors and oversaw new store openings in Michigan and Toledo, Ohio.
