= Shoppers' City =

American discount store chain

- Industry: Retail
- Defunct: 1967
- Fate: Acquired by Zayre
- Headquarters: Minneapolis / St. Paul, Minnesota, United States

Shoppers' City was a chain of seven stores in the Minneapolis / St. Paul area in the 1960s and 1970s. It was one of the forerunners of the "big box" store. The chain was notable for being one of the first stores in Minnesota to open on Sundays. It included discount groceries, home goods and sundries along with a barber shop, pharmacy, dry cleaners and snack bar; it also featured a furniture and appliance department on the mezzanine, at one time run by the Furniture Barn. In the early 1970s the furniture departments were owned by Harold Sklar and his son, Charles. They also owned Sklar's Furniture Store in Duluth's West End in the mid-1970s, where it was surrounded by four other furniture stores. It was sold to the larger Massachusetts-based chain Zayre in 1967; thereafter, the Zayre locations in the Twin Cities market were known as "Zayre Shoppers' City."
