= Cala Foods =

American supermarket chain

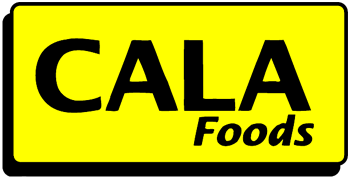
- Company type: Subsidiary of The Kroger Co.
- Industry: Retail
- Founded: 1947 (San Francisco, California)
- Defunct: 2011
- Fate: Stores closed
- Successor: DeLano's IGA
- Products: Bakery, dairy, deli, frozen foods, grocery, meat, pharmacy, produce, seafood, snacks, liquor
- Parent: Kroger/Ralphs
- Subsidiaries: Bell Markets

Cala Foods was a supermarket chain operating in San Francisco, California. Cala Foods was the sister chain to Bell Markets. The last Cala Foods store closed its doors on December 1, 2011.

== History ==
Cala Foods was established in 1947 by the seven brothers of the Cala family. Cala Foods acquired the QFI supermarket chain in 1973. The company merged with Bell Markets in the mid-1970s. Bell Markets was founded in the 1940s when Dominick Bell and his two brothers opened a supermarket in San Francisco.

Cala Foods was the first supermarket chain in San Francisco to stay open 24 hours per day, and one of the first in the US to use checkout scanners. The chain would eventually extend as far south as Santa Clara County and as far north as Marin County.

The Cala Foods chain was purchased by the Yucaipa Companies in 1988. In 1994, Cala became a division of the Ralphs Grocery Company when Ralphs merged with Yucaipa. In August 2006, Ralphs reached an agreement to sell 11 of 13 Cala and Bell stores back to Harley DeLano, previous manager of the chain. While DeLano retains the right to use the Cala and Bell store names, Kroger retains ownership of the names themselves. In January 2007, DeLano Retail Partners took control of all but one Cala Foods stores and immediately rebranded the stores to DeLano's IGA. In late 2010, it was announced that Delano's was struggling financially and that the majority of DeLano's IGA locations would be closing.

The store at the intersection of California and Hyde streets on San Francisco's Nob Hill was operated by Kroger and represented the last Cala Foods store until its closure on December 1, 2011. It was originally slated to close at the end of 2010, but would remain open for another year.

Following concerns that the distinctive building would be torn down, Trader Joe's instead opened a branch within it in 2012.
