= Virginia Dare Dresses, Incorporated =

Virginia Dare Dresses, Incorporated operated a chain of retail stores in New York City. Based at 462 7th Avenue (Manhattan), the company became a casualty of the Great Depression. In March 1933, it went into receivership, with a court-appointed receiver being named. In October 1934, the business emerged from financial difficulty and leased 10,000 square feet (930 m^{2}) of space in the Penn Terminal Building at 370 7th Avenue. Philip Wise, another women's wear chain, and Wheelan Studios, rented property in the same building. The re-emergent organization was known as Virginia Dare Stores, Inc. It is important for having survived in a turbulent economic time in United States history.

== Merchandise and relocation ==
The clothing items sold by the retailer included misses' fur trimmed coats, handbags, blouses, sweaters, negligees, and lingeries. In October 1936, Virginia Dare Stores, Inc., moved its offices from the north portion of the 15th floor of the Penn Terminal Building to the 5th floor of the same edifice. The business occupied the entire 5th floor of the structure.

In 1960, Virginia Dare Stores, Inc., owned and operated Atlantic Mills Discount Department Stores.

== Change of name and merger ==
By December 1963, Virginia Dare Stores, Inc., were known as Atlantic Thrift Centers, Inc. In June 1964, the corporation ran 45 discount stores and 24 women's and children's apparel outlets. In September 1965, Atlantic Thrift Centers, Inc., agreed to merge with Spartan Industries, Inc., of New York. Spartan Industries, Inc., operated 42 discount department stores and 11 Crank drug stores.
