= Dorb the Chemist, Inc. =

New York pharmacy chain (1926–1932)

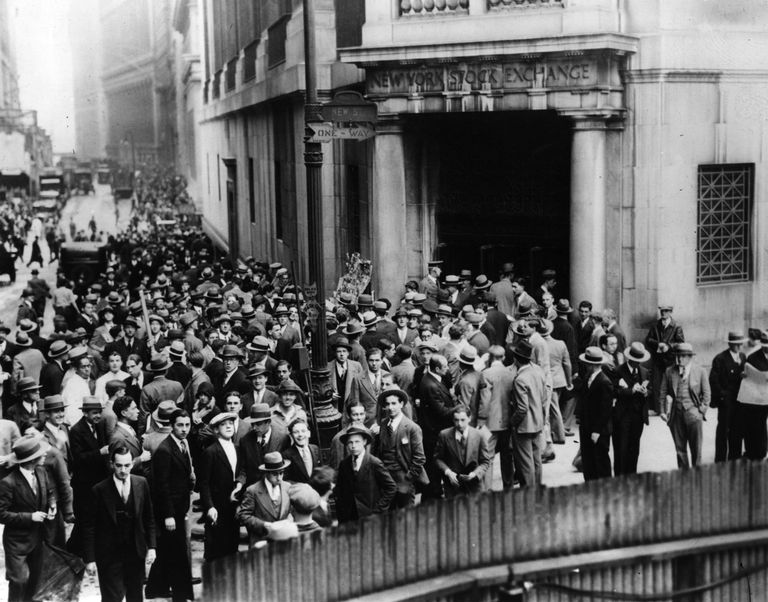
The Great Depression.

Dorb the Chemist, Inc. was a pharmaceutical chain which was based in the Murray Hill section of Manhattan, New York. The business thrived between 1926 and 1932. Started by chemist/pharmacist Abraham Dorb, the company is noteworthy because of its being an example of a firm which lost its vitality because of the Great Depression. It is also significant in the transition of Murray Hill from a social center of New York City to one which was more commercial in its nature. Dorb the Chemist, Inc., had five locations in the greater New York City and planned twenty more stores, prior to the onset of hard times in the 1930s.

== Business history ==
Dorb the Chemist purchased a site formerly occupied by a five-story brownstone at 267 Madison Avenue, between 39th Street and 40th Street. The demolished structure was replaced by a two story sandstone building which was used by Dorb for its executive offices, this building is still there. The fifth store of the chain opened in the Bartholomew Building, at East 42nd Street (Manhattan), in March 1929. In January 1930, the Sidney Smith Pharmacy of Brooklyn, New York changed its name to Dorb the Chemist. In April 1931 Dorb the Chemist leased the corner store in the Delmonico Hotel, on 59th Street and Park Avenue (Manhattan).

Abraham Dorb filed a petition for bankruptcy in November 1932. His liabilities totaled $166,271, including contingent obligations on debts contracted by Dorb the Chemist, Inc., and Delmonic Dorb the Chemist, Inc., no assets.
