= Buehler Foods =

American grocery store chain

Buehler Foods, Inc.
- Type: Private
- Industry: Retail
- Founded: Jasper, Indiana (August 10, 1940)
- Founder: Gabe Buehler; Marge Buehler
- Headquarters: Jasper, Indiana, U.S.
- Number of locations: 22 (2008)
- Area served: Indiana, Illinois
- Key people: Craig Knies, Marketing Director
- Products: Grocery
- Revenue: US$281,800,000 (est.)
- Number of employees: 2,600 (2007 est.)
- Parent: Houchens Industries
- Website: http://www.houchensnorth.com

Buehler Foods, Inc., was an American grocery store chain based in Jasper, Indiana.

Buehler Foods was founded in 1940 by Gabe and Marge Buehler in Jasper, Indiana. The Buehlers operated a single store, but the company eventually grew to own a total of 22 stores in Illinois, Indiana and Kentucky. The company has a major presence in the Evansville, Indiana, market, with six stores in that city.

On April 24, 2008, Buehler Foods announced the company's intention to sell all of the company's stores to Houchens Industries of Bowling Green, Kentucky.

== History ==
=== Founding and growth ===
Buehler Foods was founded in 1940 by Gabe and Marge Buehler, who opened their first grocery store in Jasper, Indiana. The family-owned company subsequently expanded across southern Indiana, Illinois and Kentucky, operating its supermarkets primarily under the Buehler's Buy-Low name.

By 2004, Buehler Foods operated 28 Buehler's Buy-Low supermarkets in Indiana, Illinois and Kentucky, as well as 21 Save-A-Lot stores in several states. Buy-Low locations were full-service supermarkets ranging from approximately 25,000 to 70,000 square feet and included departments such as pharmacies, bakeries and floral departments.
