= Davega Stores =

Davega Stores was a consumer durables, appliance, sporting goods, and apparel chain which operated 27 stores in the metropolitan New York City area in 1954.

The business was founded by I. Davega in 1879 at Third Avenue and 34th Street. H. M. Stein was the company's president in the mid-1950s. Its vice-president was Abram Davega, son of I. Davega. The firm was a division of the Atlas Stores Corporation.

Among the products sold by the retailer were televisions, radios, and baseball board games. The Kolster Radio Corporation signed an agreement with Davega Stores in late 1928, representing a significant addition to the retail outlets of the radio merchandise dealer. In 1936, Davega became a principal stockholder of Majestic Radio & Television.

== Business history ==
Davega Stores' 14th location opened at 166-07 Jamaica Avenue in Jamaica, Queens, in November 1928. Their 27th store opened at 924 Flatbush Avenue, Brooklyn, in April 1932. By May 1953, there were 5 New Jersey locations (Hackensack, Jersey City, Newark, New Brunswick, and Paterson) and 10 New York locations (Manhattan, Astoria, Brooklyn, Flushing, Hempstead, Jamaica, Rego Park, White Plains, Syosset, and Yonkers).

In June 1953 the business announced a sharp increase in profit over the previous year which ended on March 31, 1952. Net income came to $118,998, amounting to 0.24 per common share. The firm's inventory increased by $143,000 over the previous year, with an inventory totaling $4,389,000. On December 16, 1953 Davega Stores' directors took no action on a common dividend, which had been 0.15, paid semiannually to shareholders. A regular quarterly dividend of 0.25 on 5 per cent preferred stock was declared, payable on January 2, 1954. In May 1954 the firm was generating $25,000,000 in annual revenue.

In April 1954, Davega Stores employed large newspaper space and window displays in marketing Line Drive, a baseball game manufactured by Lord & Freber of Los Angeles, California. The product tested players team-managing ability and playing style.

The corporation opened a new store at 152 West 42nd Street, in the Times Square area, on November 6, 1954. On opening day the store offered bargains like a $20 table radio for $0.98 and reconditioned television receivers for $7.95. It remained open all night the first day of business and until twelve midnight the following day.

== Bankruptcy ==
A federal court ordered Davega Stores into straight bankruptcy in April 1963, when its court-appointed trustee could not formulate a reorganization plan under which the chain could pay its debts. Eight of its stores were acquired by Henry Modell & Co. (parent company of today's Modell's Sporting Goods), which submitted a winning bid of $311,000 in an April 1963 auction. Henry Modell was the president of the newly formed Modell's Davega, Inc., which combined eight Davega Stores with its four discount locations. The headquarters of the new business was moved to Davega's store in the Commodore Hotel.
