= Yardbirds Home Center =

- Company type: Private
- Industry: Retail
- Founded: 1975
- Founder: John Morrison Headley
- Defunct: April 2009
- Fate: Liquidated by Home Depot
- Headquarters: Santa Rosa, California
- Products: plumbing fixtures; tools; hardware; garden supplies & plants

Yardbirds Home Center was a chain of home improvement stores founded by John Morrison Headley in 1975 and based in Santa Rosa, California, United States. Their trademark colors were yellow and white. Their mascot was a white buzzard with yellow overalls. These stores were not affiliated with the Yard Birds stores based out of Chehalis, Washington that used a black bird with a yellow beak as its mascot.

Yardbirds had stores throughout the Bay Area in Santa Rosa, Petaluma, Fairfield, Concord, Martinez, San Rafael, Vacaville, San Pablo, Vallejo, Alamo, Healdsburg and Rohnert Park.

The chain was purchased by Home Depot in 2005 and the stores were closed for remodeling. Two reopened as Home Depots, while three were closed permanently. Five smaller stores were reopened in Spring 2007 as YardBIRDS, a Home Depot company, but have since closed.

Late in January 2009 Home Depot announced the closing of all 5 YardBirds Stores along with the entire EXPO division.

John Morrison Headley, founder of Yardbirds, died in 2012.
