= Lechters Housewares =

Kitchenware store chain in the United States

Lechters Inc.
- Type: Public
- Traded as: Nasdaq: LECH (1989-2001)
- Industry: Retail
- Founded: 1975; 51 years ago in Rockaway, New Jersey
- Founder: Albert Lechter
- Defunct: 2001; 25 years ago
- Fate: Bankruptcy
- Headquarters: Harrison, New Jersey
- Number of locations: 490 (2000)
- Area served: United States
- Key people: Donald Jonas
- Products: Kitchenware
- Subsidiaries: Famous Brands Housewares Outlet; Costless Home Store
- Website: Lechters website at the Wayback Machine (archived November 4, 1999)

Lechters Housewares was a national chain of kitchen-supply stores in the United States, based in Harrison, New Jersey. Many of its stores were in malls. Its store-brand products used the name Cooks Club. It owned the Costless Home Store and Famous Brands Housewares Outlet chains.

In 1975, the firm was started by Albert Lechter as a company that ran housewares departments located in leased space within New Jersey discount stores. Two years later, Lechter teamed up with Donald Jonas to change the business by opening a single stand-alone kitchenware speciality store in a Rockaway, New Jersey, shopping mall. By 1988, the firm had 234 stores. The company went public in 1989. In 1992, the firm grew to 455 stores in 37 states and finally 490 stores in 41 states by the end of 2000. In later years, the company tried to compete with houseware superstores such as Bed Bath & Beyond and Linens 'n Things by expanding rapidly beyond its original kitchenware specialty, a move which created a cash flow problem and contributed to company's downfall.

In 2000, it renamed its stores Lechters Thinkkitchen in advertising, but it was not able to convert its stores to the brand when it declared bankruptcy. It went out of business in 2001.
