= Dick's Supermarket =

Former regional chain of grocery stores

- Industry: Grocery
- Founder: Richard Brodbeck
- Defunct: 2001
- Fate: Acquired by Piggly Wiggly
- Headquarters: Platteville, Wisconsin, USA
- Area served: Southwestern Wisconsin
- Key people: Richard Brodbeck
- Products: Groceries
- Owner: Piggly Wiggly

Dick's Supermarket, also known as Brodbeck Enterprises Inc., was a regional chain of grocery stores in Southwestern Wisconsin founded by Richard Brodbeck. Dick's was based in Platteville, Wisconsin, where its main store was located. Dick's also operated a bakery in Platteville where most of the chain's baked goods were produced. There were also Dick's supermarkets in the small Town of Lancaster, Monroe, Darlington, Dodgeville, and a number of other small towns in Southwestern Wisconsin; as well as Galena, Illinois and Maquoketa, Iowa. Each Dick's supermarket included an in-house floral shop called the Blooming Basket, and the chain had a loyalty program called Dick's Savings Club (previously Dick's Insider Savings Club).

In 2001, Dick's was acquired by Piggly Wiggly. Dick's continued to operate under the Dick's name until 2006, when they were briefly rebranded as "Dick's Piggly Wiggly", featuring the Piggly Wiggly logo with a small rendition of the Dick's logo above and to the left. However, the Dick's brand has since been scrapped entirely, and all former Dick's locations still in operation are now simply Piggly Wiggly.
