= Standard Drug Company (Richmond, Virginia) =

- Industry: Pharmacy
- Founded: 1919; 107 years ago
- Founders: Samuel Rosenthal; Leo Rosenthal
- Defunct: 1993
- Fate: Acquired by CVS Corp.
- Headquarters: Richmond, Virginia, United States

Standard Drug Company was a drugstore chain based in Richmond, Virginia. It was founded in 1919 by Samuel and Leo Rosenthal, who were graduates of the MCV School of Pharmacy. The first store opened on Main Street in Downtown Richmond as a pharmacy only. In 1921 the Rosenthals acquired a large building at the corner of First and Broad streets that became the anchor store to the first discount drug chain in America. It thrived for decades, expanding throughout Virginia into Washington, D.C., and its Maryland suburbs.

== Sale ==
In October 1993, the 60-store Standard Drug chain was bought by CVS Corp., which closed several locations and renamed the others as Peoples Drug stores. CVS had purchased the Washington, D.C.–based Peoples in 1990, renovating and expanding most of the stores, but had retained the Peoples name. At the time of the company's purchase of Standard, plans already were under way to change the Peoples locations to CVS/Pharmacy stores. That name change happened in May 1994. Instead of keeping the Standard name until the change to CVS, the company made the temporary change to Peoples, as the stores' designs would be much closer to the future look of CVS stores, thus making the upcoming change to CVS much easier.

== Legacy ==
Evidence of Standard's presence in Richmond still exists, including an old billboard in Downtown Richmond and two storefronts on which the imprint of the Standard Drug Company name is still visible. One of these is on North 1st Street in Downtown, and the other is in the 1300 block of Hull Street on South Side. The Hull Street building dates back to the 1920s, and has been cited for its historic architecture, along with most of the Old Manchester neighborhood in which it is located. The company also is remembered for its Carytown location, which housed a pet monkey in its basement, along with a digital thermometer and clock on the building's east side. The store is now a CVS, but was renovated in the mid-2000s so that the digital sign no longer exists. Another type of digital sign, more typical of CVS stores, now adorns another part of the east wall.
