= Mitchell Gold + Bob Williams =

Retail company

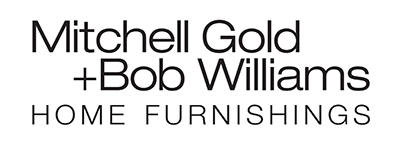
- Logo of Mitchell Gold + Bob Williams
- Company type: Furniture store
- Industry: Retail
- Founded: 1989; 37 years ago, Taylorsville, North Carolina
- Founder: Mitchell Gold; Bob Williams
- Defunct: August 26, 2023
- Fate: Liquidation
- Headquarters: Taylorsville, North Carolina, U.S.
- Number of locations: 0 (2023)
- Products: Furniture
- Owner: Independent (1989-1998, 2002-2014); Rowe Furniture (1998-2002); The Stephens Group, LLC. (2014-2023)

Mitchell Gold + Bob Williams (formerly known as Mitchell Gold) is an American furniture company based in Taylorsville, North Carolina. The company once had 3 plants and 24 retail showrooms in the United States. In August 2023, Mitchell Gold + Bob Williams announced that it would be permanently shuttering its operations after nearly 35 years.Surya acquired MG+BW in November 2023. Surya is a furniture and textile company that plans to reintroduce MG+BW as a to-the-trade only brand.

== History ==
Founders Mitchell Gold and Bob Williams first founded the company back in 1989 as a small upholstery company in Taylorsville, North Carolina. Gold was formerly a furniture buyer at Bloomingdale's. As the face of the business, his corporate uniform included a denim shirt and Gucci loafers. Williams, who was originally a graphic artist, designed the line. Williams could drill down on what shoppers were looking for.

In the early 1990s, the founders purchased an existing factory in Taylorsville, and had one of the first factories in the state of North Carolina with air conditioning. They had other developmental plans inside the factory, including a on-site gym, a health clinic, a child-care center with child-size club chairs and denim sofas, and a personal chef to make seared salmon with mango salsa in the employee cafeteria.

In 1998, the company was sold to Rowe Furniture in a deal that would allow them to keep managing the business as normal, mainly due to the fact that the founders had a strong role in being part of the LGBTQ community, which risked both founders of inheritance taxes if one of the founders were to die, which could have driven the company to bankruptcy. In 2002, Gold and Williams bought back the firm with a group of New York investors, and changed the company's name to "Mitchell Gold + Bob Williams" in effort to reflect the contributions of both founders.

In 2007, Mitchell Gold + Bob Williams opened their first furniture showroom store in Washington, D.C. at 14th Street NW, near Logan Circle. The company quickly expanded to around 25 showrooms during the remainder of its lifetime before shutting down abruptly in August 2023.

In late 2014, Mitchell Gold + Bob Williams was sold to The Stephens Group, which was a family-run private equity firm which mostly owned tech and industrial brands and holdings. The company retains equity in furniture and electronics store chain Conn's.

On August 26, 2023, Mitchell Gold + Bob Williams announced that it would be permanently ceasing all operations effective immediately, and would be permanently shuttering its 3 plants and factories, its 24 furniture showrooms and outlet stores, and its corporate headquarters in Taylorsville. The company stated it was unable to obtain additional financing to continue operating. All employees were terminated effective almost immediately after the closure was announced.

On August 31, 2023, The Stephens Group put Mitchell Gold + Bob Williams into Chapter 11 bankruptcy in the United States District Court for the District of Delaware after the closure announcement. On October 7, 2023, a court judge ordered Mitchell Gold + Bob Williams to convert its Chapter 11 bankruptcy into a Chapter 7 bankruptcy liquidation.

On November 2, 2023, however, Mitchell Gold + Bob Williams reached an agreement with Ryder to send a letter to customers of the company to pay for their delivery to receive remaining supply of furniture they have in their warehouses. Any customers who paid delivery service for their furniture was removed from MGBW's bankruptcy proceedings.

Surya acquired Mitchell Gold + Bob Williams (MG+BW) in November 2023. Surya is a furniture and textile company that acquired the brand's intellectual property (IP), inventory, and manufacturing equipment. Surya will reintroduce the brand as a trade-only partner, accessible to leading interior designers and design-driven retailers. Surya will focus on rehiring previous MG+BW talent and reviving production at its original North Carolina facilities.

== See also ==
- Retail apocalypse
