= Kinsley & Darling Druggists =

1850s pharmaceutical dealers in New York City

Kinsley & Darling Druggists were wholesale pharmaceutical dealers in New York City in the 1850s. The firm dealt in pure medicines, chemicals, paints, oils, and dyes. They were located at 62 Vesey Street in Manhattan An early morning fire on the morning of May 10, 1855, did more than $70,000 worth of damage to businesses located on Vesey Street, including $15,000 to Kinsley & Darling. Their upper story and roof were burned and the lower floors were soaked with water.

As successors to Greenleaf & Kinsley the business was significant in mid-19th century New York for the variety of products it sold. Aside from medicinal items, the company supplied country merchants, artisans, grocers, bakers, confectioners, distillers, and restaurateurs.

== Business fails ==
Kinsley & Darling became insolvent in 1856. According to testimony given at the New York Court of General Sessions, December 11, 1856, Charles Wills of Wills & Conley, had advanced money on notes for Kinsley & Darling six months prior to the druggists' failure. Emil Schoning, a druggist whose business address was 175 Second Street and 700 Eighth Avenue, was requested by Darling to go and buy notes for $100. Schoning testified concerning this at the trial of Wills and Conley for receiving $7,000 (~$244,974 in 2024) of stolen goods.
