= Tweeter (store) =

Electronics retail chain in the United States

TWTR Inc.
- Formerly: Tweeter Opco; Tweeter Home Entertainment Inc.
- Type: Limited liability company (Tweeter Opco); Corporation (TWTR Inc.)
- Industry: Consumer electronics retail
- Founded: May 1, 1972; 54 years ago (Boston)
- Founder: Sandy Bloomberg, Michael Bloomberg
- Defunct: April 23, 2014; 12 years ago
- Fate: Chapter 11 Bankruptcy And Liquidation
- Headquarters: Canton, MA
- Number of locations: 100 (at the time of closure)

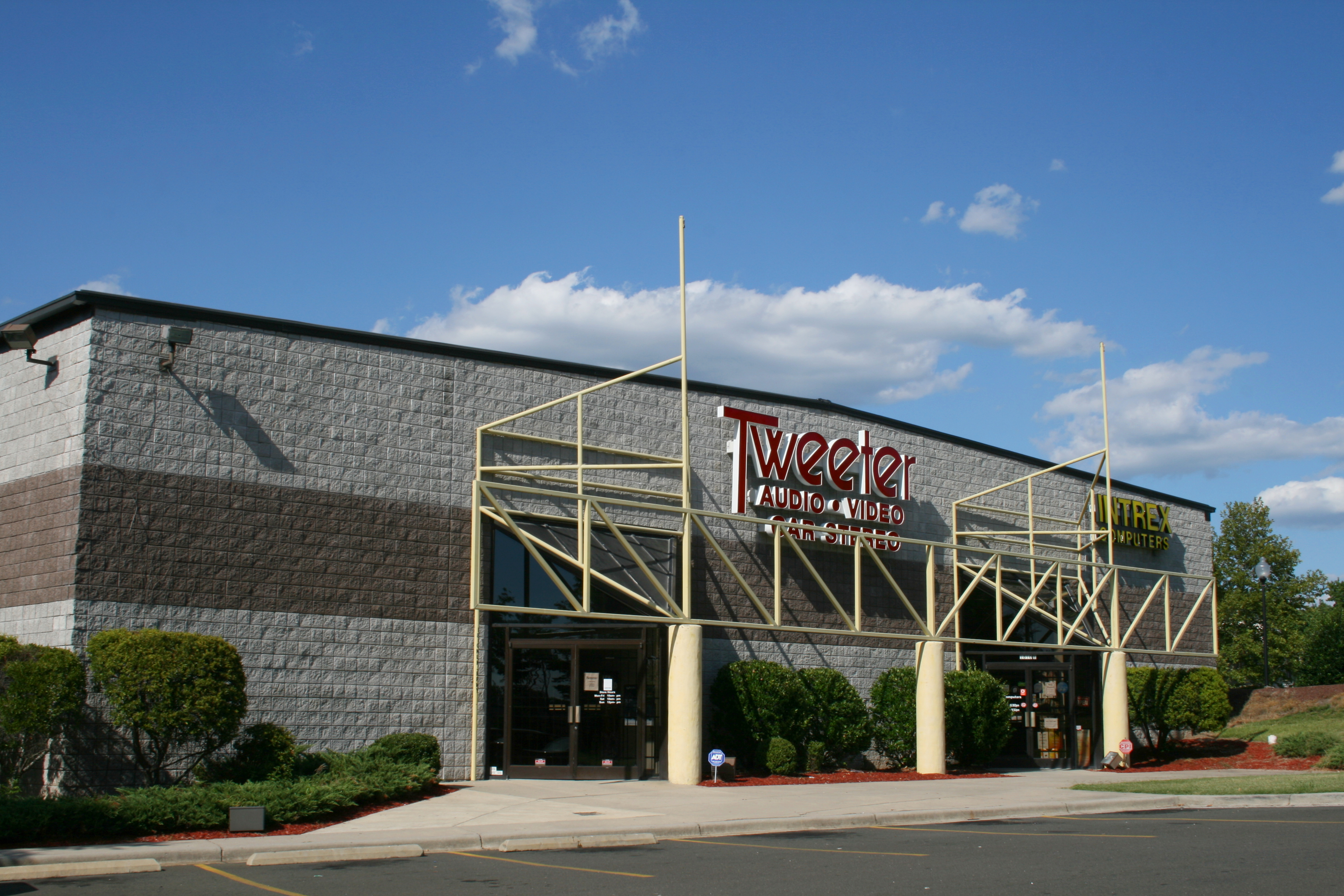
Tweeter store in Durham, North Carolina.

Tweeter, formerly Tweeter Etc. and Tweeter Home Entertainment, was a specialty consumer electronics retailer providing mid and high end electronic equipment, including flat panel TVs, plasma TVs, car radios, home theater systems, GPSs and more. It also focused much of its business on custom installation of electronics for homes and automobiles.

The company had more than 100 stores in 18 U.S. states, mostly along the east coast, but also including Illinois, Texas, California, Nevada and Arizona, operating under the names Tweeter, HiFi Buys, Showcase Home Entertainment and Sound Advice.

The company was founded by Sandy and Michael Bloomberg who opened the first store in the Boston area in 1972, and the company quickly expanded throughout New England.

Tweeter continued expanding largely through acquisitions, the first of these being Bryn Mawr Stereo in 1996. It then added Atlanta-based HiFi Buys in 1997, San Diego based DOW Stereo/Video in 1999, Chicago-based United Audio Center and Douglas TV stores in 2000 and Florida-based Sound Advice in 2001. These acquisitions gave Tweeter an instant presence in the Southeast and Midwest during a booming housing market.

In March 2007, Tweeter announced the closing of 49 stores and the layoffs of 650 employees, and shuttered all of its stores in California and most of its stores in the Southeast. In June 2007 Tweeter Home Entertainment filed for Chapter 11 bankruptcy protection and its assets were purchased by Schultze Asset Management at auction on July 13, 2007, after a failed reorganization plan. Schultze reformed the company as Tweeter Opco LLC.

After an attempt to revive the company, Tweeter Opco filed for Chapter 11 on November 5, 2008. Prior to filing the company had started going out of business sales in anticipation of the holiday season. However, a dispute among creditors regarding operating cash to continue the sales forced the closure of all stores on December 3, 2008, the firing of all 600 employees and the company filed a conversion of its Chapter 11 reorganization to a Chapter 7 liquidation. Customers reported paid goods and deposits were part of frozen assets which eventually forced them to file as creditors in the liquidation.

== TWTR Inc. ==
Following the original 2007 Chapter 11 filing and sale of assets to Schultze, the original Tweeter company (now a shell company) remained active, having been renamed TWTR Inc..

On October 4, 2013, more than six years after selling its assets (and almost five years after the Tweeter chain shut down for good), shares of TWTR Inc. (at that point still listed under "TWTRQ") were trading for as much as 1 500% above the previous day's closing price (US$0.15 vs $0.007). It ultimately closed at $0.051 (a gain of over 684%), after trading was halted at 12:42pm EDT. Twitter, Inc. had released its preliminary initial public offering filings the previous day which revealed it was planning to use the ticker symbol "TWTR" (Tweeter's ticker symbol before its original bankruptcy filing), which apparently led to confusion among some investors. Shortly after the incident, the company's ticker symbol was changed to "THEGQ". The company ceased to exist on April 23, 2014.
