= Schaak Electronics =

Consumer Electronics retailer

Schaak Electronics was a consumer electronics company based in Minneapolis-St. Paul. The company started in the early 1970s with audio products, then expanded to personal computers and other electronics. Although it was the largest company of its kind in the region, it became defunct in the mid-1980s.

Schaak Electronics was originally an audio-related products company headed by Richard L. (Dick) Schaak which expanded to personal computers (Digital Den) and other consumer electronics from the early 1970s to about 1986, headquartered in St. Paul, Minnesota.

== History ==
=== Early history ===
Schaak Electronics had its origins in a small radio and television repair shop in South Minneapolis, begun in 1957 by Leander Schaak. In 1960, his son Richard, known as Dick, dropped out of school and began working for his father. Dick soon took over the business when Leander died unexpectedly that October.

As Dick Schaak learned the business, he began advertising and focusing on audio equipment. By 1971, he had expanded the business to ten stores, including one in St. Cloud and one in Rochester, in addition to eight in the Twin Cities. Two years later he had stores in Milwaukee and Chicago. The Jaycees named him one of ten outstanding young men in Minnesota in 1972.

In 1972, Schaak Electronics, Inc., had its initial public offering of shares; Dick Schaak controlled about 80% of the stock. At that time the company was described as a retail seller of audio equipment for home and office use.

In 1973, Dick Schaak engineered a dramatic change in the company. The Tandy Corporation had been ordered to divest itself of Allied Radio. With the opportunity to buy not only 8 Allied stores in Chicago, but 19 in other locations, he made the acquisition and Schaak Electronics was now double its original size.

By December, 1974, Schaak Electronics was advertising on local Twin Cities air waves, broadcasting at least two different radio commercials on KTCR-FM with a character named Uncle Allie talking to his nephew Timmy. These two characters also appeared in a Schaak Electronics - Allied Radio catalog during the mid-1970s.

But the expansion proved to be too much, especially in the context of economic recession in the US. Schaak Electronics lost money in 1974, in spite of significant sales increases. The pattern continued in 1975 with even more sales and even more money lost. In spite of efforts to control costs by closing some stores, Schaak Electronics filed for Chapter 11 bankruptcy in the spring of 1975. A two-year battle with creditors ensued, including American National Bank and Manufacturers Hanover.

By 1976, issues with the banks were resolved and the company returned to profitability. By 1978, creditors had been repaid and profitability continued to grow.

In 1977 they opened their fifteenth location at Burnsville Center in Burnsville, Minnesota.

As the 1980s began, Schaak Electronics reported sales figures around $50 million a year, and growing rapidly. By 1984, the company was predicting an $80 million year for its chain of 60 stores. Their radio ads were well known in the Twin Cities, especially the sound effects used with their name.

Dick Schaak was a respected member of the Twin Cities community, even serving as King Boreas Rex XLV in the St. Paul Winter Carnival of 1981. This allowed him to produce a 'gold' medallion with greetings from Schaak Electronics and signed by Dick Schaak.

Schaak's Computer Academy, a personal computer training facility at the Maplewood Mall in Maplewood, Minnesota, opened in 1983. It offered a variety of PC training and courses, held during the day, evenings and weekends. The location in a shopping mall was intended to draw both attention and registrations from the passers-by. The training facility later moved to a location in Mendota Heights.

Promotional ruler for Schaak's Computer Academy

=== Decline and closure ===
On July 10, 1985, Larry H. Welch, claiming he had been forced to quit, resigned as chairman, chief executive and a director of Schaak Electronics Inc. after less than two months in the posts. Richard L. Schaak resumed the roles. 1985 was the year that Schaak Electronics filed for bankruptcy, liquidating its assets.

On Valentine's Day, Friday, February 14, 1986, Schaak Electronics abruptly closed its remaining 21 stores and let 250 employees go. Their entire inventory was purchased by the Sound of Music, precursor to Best Buy. They held a huge sale at the Minnesota State Fairgrounds on April 25, 1986, and took in about one million dollars of sales that day.

There is little public information as to Dick Schaak's activities once his company closed. He was quoted in a 2008 article on the collapse of the Petters empire, remembering Tom Petters as an outstanding Schaak Electronics salesman. (Apparently, the admiration was mutual: "Schaak made a big impression on me," says Petters, who became acquainted with Dick Schaak.)
