= Klopfenstein's =

Men's clothing store

- Industry: Retail, clothing store
- Founded: 1909 (Tacoma, Washington)
- Defunct: 1992
- Fate: Closed
- Headquarters: Seattle, Washington; United States
- Products: Men's apparel and accessories, Women's apparel and accessories, tailoring
- Parent: Hartmarx (1968–1992)

Klopfenstein's was an upscale men's clothing store in the Seattle-Tacoma Metropolitan Area founded in 1918 in Tacoma, Washington. Stores were operated in most of the area's major shopping malls as well as stores in downtown Tacoma and Seattle, across the street from Frederick & Nelson's flagship store. It was owned by Hartmarx from the late 1960s until its closing in 1992.

== History ==
=== Formative years ===
Clarence F. Klopfenstein was born in Tacoma, Washington in 1890 to a Mennonite family who had come to the Northwest in 1882 from Iowa. After Graduating from High School, he went to work for a New York-based clothing company, traveling the Tacoma area and selling clothes.

The store's history can be traced back to early 1909 when Klopfenstein and partner Samuel Conrad purchased the Uzafovage & Sampson Building at 1321 Commerce Street in downtown Tacoma to house their menswear store.

In 1918, Edward Mason and Klopfenstein entered into a partnership selling men's wear. They opened their new store at 936 Pacific. Mason was president with Klopfenstein serving as vice-president. They soon expanded, opening a store in downtown Seattle in 1924 at 1310 Second Avenue. The next year, Klopfenstein bought out his partner and the store became known as Klopfenstein's.

=== Peak operations ===
The store became a gathering place for "discriminating gentlemen", attracting the movers and shakers of Seattle, including pioneers, city councilman, business leaders, and even Teamster Boss, Dave Beck. The store moved again to Fourth Avenue and ownership would be passed to Clarence's son Hugh. In 1966, Klopfenstein's merged with another Seattle clothing store, Leslie - Hughes and for a brief time the company was known as Klopfenstein's - Leslie - Hughes. The store moved again in 1967 to the corner of 6th Avenue and Pine Street in the Heffernan Building, newly remodeled by architects Herbert Sobel and Richard Bouillon. This new, large store cost $500,000 and was described as "elegantly masculine but... friendly". While primarily tailoring (literally) to men's clothing, this new store also included a women's clothing department. "That store became a gathering place for downtown Seattle businessmen, recalled Karl Klopfenstein, a son of the founder. "Often, dozens of businessmen would come to the store after work - perhaps joining in a casual game of miniature golf played around the clothing racks - before moving on to Rosellini's restaurant, and home." Shortly after the new store was built, Hugh sold the family business to the Chicago based Hartmarx Corporation. They expanded the brand, opening stores in Alaska, Portland, Oregon, as well as stores in most of the malls in the Seattle area.

=== Later years and demise ===
In the Summer of 1989, Klopfenstein's flagship relocated to the newly constructed Two Union Square tower. Their old location would be occupied by Pierce Gallery, later to become part of Pacific Place (Seattle). By 1990, parent company Hartmarx was beginning to struggle financially, and cuts in its holdings were inevitable. An increase in competition from The Bon Marché and Nordstrom were cutting into its market, forcing it to scale down prices. Seeing no other option, Hartmarx sold Klopfenstein's and several other stores including Seattle men's store Littler's to investors HSSA Group Ltd., which proceeded to shutter all of them. All Klopfenstein stores would be closed by the Summer of 1993, not long after Frederick & Nelson shut its doors.

== Timeline ==
- 1909 - Clarence Klopfenstein & Samuel Conrad open for business in downtown Tacoma
- 1918 - Klopfenstein & Mason open new men's store in Tacoma
- 1924 - New Klopfenstein's opens in downtown Seattle
- 1925 - Klopfenstein buys out partner, store now known as just Klopfenstein's
- 1939 - New $80,000 Fourth Avenue Store designed by McClelland & Jones opens on May 13. Ownership passed from father to son, Hugh.
- 1950 - store opened in new Northgate Mall
- 1960 - First Oregon location opened in Lloyd Center
- 1962 - Aurora Village Store opens
- 1965 - Tacoma Mall location opens on November 26.
- 1966 - Store merges with Leslie - Hughes
- 1967 - Klopfenstein's moves into new $500,000 home at 6th Avenue & Pine Street, Seattle
- 1968 - Company sold to Hartmarx Corporation
- 1984 - Clarence Klopfenstein dies at age 93.
- 1989 - Downtown store moved yet again to Two Union Square
- 1992 - Hartmarx sells off Klopfenstein's division. All stores are closed by Summer of 1993.
