= Handy Andy Home Improvement Center =

American hardware store company (1947–1996)

Handy Andy Home Improvement Centers, Inc.
- Type: Hardware store
- Industry: Retail
- Founded: 1947 (as Arrow Lumber Company)
- Defunct: June 1996
- Fate: Bankruptcy
- Headquarters: Schaumburg, Illinois
- Key people: Richard George, President
- Products: Lumber, tools, hardware, garden supplies & plants

Handy Andy Home Improvement Centers was founded as Arrow Lumber Company by Joseph Rashkow in 1947 on the south side of Chicago. His son, Ronald Rashkow, bought out the single store operation in 1967 from his father. He converted the company to Handy Andy in 1971 with its first expansion unit. The company grew to 72 stores in seven American states (Illinois, Wisconsin, Indiana, Ohio, Missouri, Mississippi, Michigan, Tennessee, and Kentucky). At its peak, the company had approximately 11,000 employees and annual revenue of $750 million. The chain advertised with the phrase "Handy Andy, you've got it made". The company's core product mix included hardware, lumber, building materials, home decor, kitchen/bath and lawn/garden. The stores were highly visible and well known for their very large vertical stripes of brown and white that would typically cover the entire building.

== Acquisitions ==
In 1979, Handy Andy expanded its footprint by accquiring four Chicago-area Republic Lumber locates from Jewel Food Stores. The Company continued its expansion in 1986 by accquiring six Chicago -area Mr HOW stores from Nashville, Tennessee-based Service Merchandise which were subsequently rebranded. Handy Andy went on to accquire the Forest City lumber chain with locations in Ohio, Michgan and Illionois from Forest City Enterprises in 1987 This was followed by the accquisition of 21 Central Hardware store locations in Missouri, Kentucky, and Ohio as well as Witte Wholesale Hardware from Interco in 1989.

== Bankruptcy ==
Handy Andy declared bankruptcy on October 17, 1995, due to creditor pressures, which led to the closure of about 20 of its stores. At that time, Handy Andy had over $120 million in debt and was planning to reorganize into hardware supermarkets. In early 1996, however, creditors forced Handy Andy to liquidate its assets to repay its outstanding debts. On January 25, 1996, Handy Andy announced it would be closing its remaining 54 stores, laying off over 2,500 employees. By June 1996, Handy Andy Home Improvement Centers had ceased to exist.

Richard George was president of Handy Andy Home Improvement Centers. He was at the helm at the time of Handy Andy's bankruptcy on October 17, 1995, and for the company's closure in June 1996.
