= Ultimate Electronics =

Consumer electronics retailer, 1968–2011

- Type: Private
- Industry: Retailing
- Founded: 1968
- Defunct: April 15, 2011
- Fate: Defunct
- Headquarters: Thornton, Colorado, USA
- Key people: Mark Wattles
- Products: Consumer electronics

Ultimate Electronics was a chain of consumer electronics stores which filed for bankruptcy twice after 2006, liquidating and ceasing operations in 2011. At its peak, the store operated in Arizona, Colorado (where it originated as Pearse Electronics), Illinois, Iowa, Idaho, Kansas, Minnesota, Missouri, Nevada, New Mexico, Oklahoma, Oregon, Massachusetts, New Hampshire, New York, South Dakota, Texas, Pennsylvania, Utah, and Wisconsin. It was originally incorporated in the state of Delaware with principal offices in Thornton, Colorado. They only ever opened 78 locations in 20 states. At their height, they operated 64 stores in 14 states. Some of the stores had neon signs at the front of the store with a ball decoration like the one at Olde Towne Plaza in Ballwin, MO. Some of the 64 stores had circular entrances.

== History ==
=== Early history ===
Stores originally operated under other various names, including SoundTrack Colorado and Audio King Minnesota, Iowa, and South Dakota.

Ultimate began a large expansion campaign in 2000. By 2004, the company had doubled its store count to 64.

=== Closure ===
In 2005, the company filed for bankruptcy. Hollywood Video founder and then–CEO Mark Wattles acquired 32 stores in the ensuing bankruptcy auction; the remaining half were closed. Ultimate Electronics was then a privately owned company operated by Ultimate Acquisition Partners, L.P. Ultimate Acquisition Partners, L.P was a division of Wattles Capital Management, LLC. Wattles Capital Management owned 71% of Ultimate Electronics, while Hewlett-Packard Co. owned 25%. The other 4% was owned by Private Venture Capital Firms.

In November 2010, Ultimate Electronics opened a store in Tigard, Oregon. It was the only Ultimate Electronics store on the West Coast, though Wattles had hoped to open 14 more in Salem, Oregon, and the Portland metro area.

As of January 27, 2011, the new company filed for Chapter 11 bankruptcy, ultimately choosing to liquidate, converting it into Chapter 7. According to papers filed in U.S. Bankruptcy Court in Wilmington, Delaware, the company listed both assets and debt in the range of $100 million to $500 million. Among the largest unsecured creditors were Video Products Distributors (owed $6.1 million); Valassis Communications ($5.6 million); New Age Electronics/SYNNEX ($5.5 million); and Sony Electronics, ($4.8 million). Secured lender GE Capital was owed $64.8 million.
