= Fleming Companies =

American wholesale grocer

Fleming Companies, Inc.
- Formerly: Lux Mercantile (1915-1921); Fleming-Wilson (1921-1941)
- Founded: 1915; 111 years ago, in Topeka, Kansas
- Founders: O. A. Fleming; Gene Wilson; Samuel Lux
- Defunct: August 20, 2004
- Successor: Core-Mark

Fleming Companies, Inc. was founded as Lux Mercantile in Topeka, Kansas, in 1915 by O. A. Fleming, Gene Wilson and Samuel Lux. In 1921 the company's name was changed to Fleming-Wilson, and in 1941, the company name was changed again to The Fleming Company. Ned Fleming, son of O.A., was named president, chairman, and CEO. Fleming became the nation's largest grocery wholesaler in 1991 with its purchase of Furr's Supermarkets; it lost that title in 1992 to SuperValu, but regained it in 1994 after its purchase of fellow Oklahoma City firm Scrivner Inc., the third-largest wholesaler.

== Bankruptcy ==
Fleming Companies announced in April 2003 that it had filed for reorganization under Chapter 11 bankruptcy. The company's fortunes had suffered considerably over the previous two years as the result of an investigation by the U.S. Securities and Exchange Commission into questionable business and accounting practices. Fleming had also faced a class-action lawsuit from its shareholders over the validity of its public statements, ended its relationship with its largest customer, Kmart, and saw its stock price drop to less than one dollar per share.

In August 2003, C&S Wholesale Grocers, Grocers Supply Company, Associated Grocers of Florida, and Associated Wholesale Grocers bought the wholesale grocery business of Fleming.
