= Today's Man (retailer) =

- Industry: clothing retailer
- Defunct: April 24, 2003
- Fate: Bankruptcy and liquidation
- Area served: New York City, Philadelphia, and Washington, D.C.
- Products: men's wear

Today's Man (Ticker: TMAN) was a retailer chain of menswear.

Today's Man, Inc., was a chain of men's apparel stores that operated 25 retail stores in the New York City, Philadelphia, and Washington, D.C. metropolitan areas. They offered a wide selection of low-cost but good-quality merchandise. The store offered a large selection of suits in the price range between $50 and $200. In addition to suits, they also sold many other items like shirts, ties, socks, leather jackets, and belts.

During the 1970s, Today's Man grew steadily, and gradually, as the chain opened larger and larger stores. About one-third of all its clothing was private label. By 1990, Today's Man had converted all its existing stores to superstores and sales had reached $100 million. To continue expanding, raise working capital, and pay some debts, Today's Man became a public corporation in 1992 (symbol TMAN). The stock prospectus described the average superstore as having about 25,000 square feet (2,300 m^{2}) with the following merchandise: 8,000 men's suits, 3,000 sports coats, 15,000 ties, 15,000 dress shirts, and 10,000 pairs of casual or dress pants.

In the early 1990s, as Today's Man entered the New York City area, it did well financially. Sales continued to increase until 1993, despite an overall negative trend in men's apparel. Starting in 1993, Today's Man experienced some real setbacks. By November 1995, the company had reversed its expansion position and began retreating. In early February 1996, the firm filed for Chapter 11 bankruptcy. A combination of soft demand for men's business attire, management's overambitious plans and mistakes, money problems, and tough competition led to Today's Man decline. The company continued to downsize and restructure but did not succeed. They went out of business on April 24, 2003.
