= G. E. M. Membership Department Stores =

Store Chain in USA and Canada

G.E.M.
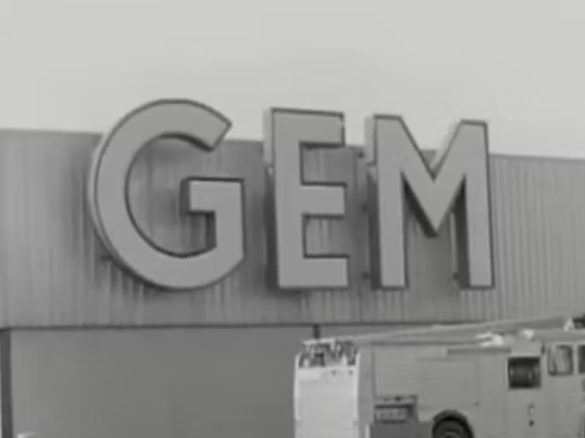
- Company type: subsidiary
- Industry: Retail
- Founded: 1956; 70 years ago in Denver, Colorado
- Defunct: 1979; 47 years ago
- Fate: Closure due to Chapter 10 Bankruptcy of parent
- Headquarters: Kansas City
- Products: clothing, footwear, housewares, sporting goods, hardware, toys, electronics, appliances, cameras, drugs, and auto repair
- Parent: Parkview-GEM (1966-1977)

G. E. M. Membership Department Stores was a chain of discount stores, in the US and Canada. Their first location opened in Denver in 1956.

GEM offered something different: membership. The qualifications included government-, religious- and school employees, members of the armed forces, and employees of companies that did “substantial work” under government contract. GEM pioneered the way for later “membership” stores, like Sam's Club and Costco.

Several departments were operated by outside firms on a lease basis. The prices were low, the selection vast, and the no-frills stores themselves were huge in size in their day, that included supermarkets and more within the 50-plus departments and had gasoline pumps outside.

== History ==
Canadian pharmacist Murray Koffler was an investor in the G.E.M. chain, bringing the first G.E.M. store to Toronto in 1959. He eventually subleased the G.E.M. drug department in several Toronto area stores. Following the G.E.M. discount model, Koffler later opened one of the first "big box" store chains, Shoppers Drug Mart.

The first G.E.M. (Government Employees Mutual) store was opened in June 1956 in Denver by Ronald D. Evans, the former general manager of the G.E.T. (Government Employees Together) store in San Francisco.

The second GEM store was opened in Kansas City in July 1957 followed by the third GEM store that was opened in Honolulu a few days later. The fourth store followed a year later in August 1958 in St. Louis.

On November 7, 1964, GEM opened its first store in the UK. This branch in West Bridgford, Nottingham, the first out-of-town superstore in the UK, was soon taken over by Asda.

By the mid-1960s, there were reportedly more than a million GEM members throughout the U.S. and Canada. GEM announced plans in December 1965 to merge with Parkview Drugs, a Kansas City-based chain, creating a new parent company called Parkview-GEM. The merger was finalize five months later.

A 1971 Democrat and Chronicle story reported that a lone gunman robbed more than $6,000 from the cashier’s office at a Rochester, New York, GEM. Asked how he got into the store and past the buzzer-entrance, a store official said he "may have used a stolen or lost card to enter.

The end for GEM came soon after. Officials announced plans in early 1973 that it would close all stores. By then, GEM had opened membership to anyone for the past two years.

=== Decline and bankruptcy ===
Parkview-GEM closed two money-losing stores in Indianapolis in October 1972. Two months later. Parkview-GEM announced closings of stores in Hartford, Cincinnati, Omaha north, and Saugus in December 1972. By May 1973, the company had closed 22 stores and sold off its 12 retail drug stores just since the previous November.

After closing a number of stores, Parkview-GEM filed for Chapter 10 Bankruptcy protection in December 1973 due to its inability to paying its debts when they mature, creating a negative net worth of several million dollars. While acting under a court appointed trustee, the company began to slowly liquidate its assets. By August 1979, the company was reduced to three profitable stores in Hawaii. Parkview-GEM ceased to exist shortly after the sale of the remaining three stores. The sale of the three Hawaiian stores to Seiyu Stores of Japan was finalized in December 1979. Seiyu closed its GEM of Hawaii stores in 1993.
