= Sun Television and Appliances =

Consumer electronics retailer, 1949–1998

- Company type: 1949 - 1991: Private; May 1991 - 1998: Nasdaq
- Industry: Retail
- Founded: 1949
- Founder: Macy Block and Herbie Block
- Defunct: 1998
- Fate: Bankruptcy And Liquidation
- Headquarters: Columbus, Ohio, United States
- Area served: Northeastern United States, Midwestern United States
- Key people: Macy Block, Bob Oyster, Paul Prosser, Ed Hirsch
- Products: Consumer electronics, home appliances, car audio sales and installation, office equipment, parts and accessories
- Services: Repair and installation
- Parent: ZS Sun Limited Partnership

Sun Television and Appliances was a speciality retailer of consumer electronics, home appliances, and office equipment founded in 1949 by brothers Macy and Herbie Block. The company had stores in cities throughout the midwest, and also operated stores in rural areas of the United States, where there was no other competition in Ohio, Indiana, New York, Pennsylvania, Maryland, West Virginia, Virginia and Kentucky.

In late 1996, Indiana-based H.H. Gregg Appliances and Electronics had arranged to purchase Sun in an $87.5 million deal that would have paid $5 per share to the owners of Sun's 17.5 million outstanding shares. However, H.H. Gregg withdrew from the deal over concerns regarding Sun's financial condition.

The company after filed for Chapter 11 bankruptcy in September 1998. After attempts to sell the company as a going concern failed, The company converted to a Chapter 7 liquidation, and ceased operations by the end of the year. Some locations were purchased by H.H. Gregg Appliances and Electronics, and were reopened as H.H. Gregg locations.
