= Cunningham Drug (U.S.) =

Drug company

- Industry: Retail
- Founded: October 1889
- Defunct: 1982
- Fate: Acquired
- Successor: Various
- Headquarters: Detroit, Michigan, USA
- Key people: Andrew Cunningham – founder
- Products: Retail, Pharmacy

Cunningham Drug was a drugstore chain based in Detroit, Michigan. Founded on October 2, 1889 by Andrew R. Cunningham, the chain operated primarily within the state of Michigan, and was once the largest drugstore chain in the state. Its Michigan locations were closed and reopened in 1982 as Apex Drug, and were later sold to Perry Drug Stores. The last stores remained open in Florida until 1991, when they were sold to Walgreens.

== History ==
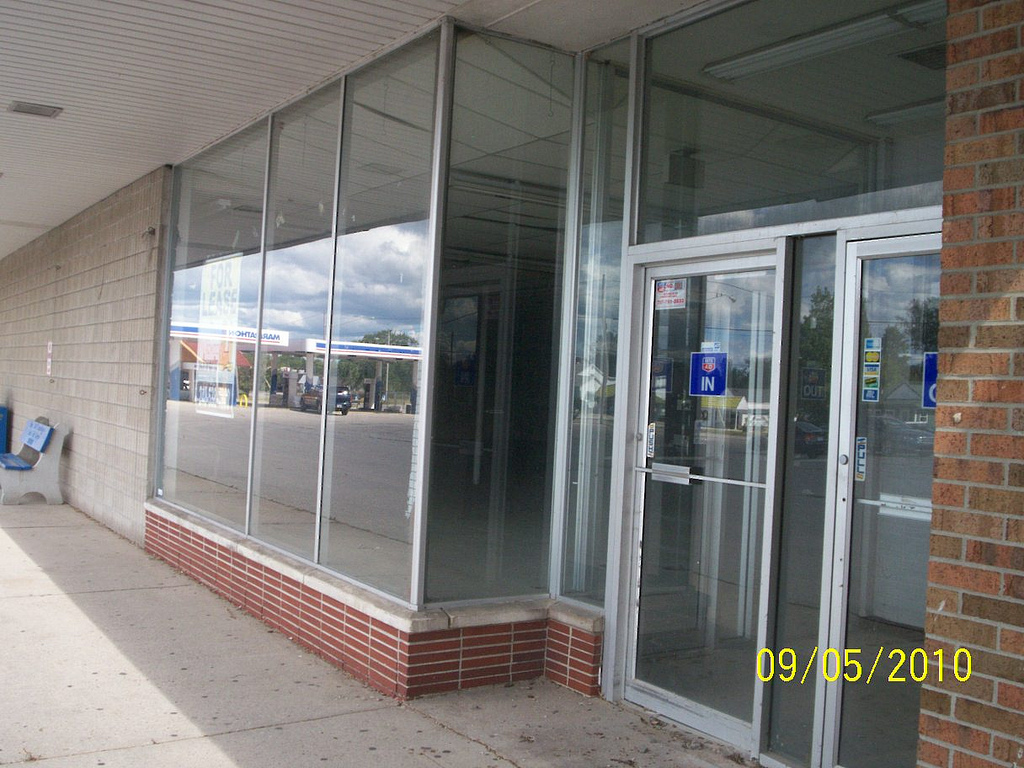
A former Cunningham Drug (later Perry Drug and then Rite Aid) in Oscoda, Michigan. Since this picture was taken, the building has been re-tenanted by Goodwill Industries.

Andrew R. Cunningham opened the first Cunningham drug store in Detroit in October 1889 when he purchased a storefront on at 264 Joseph Campau Avenue. By 1914, he owned five stores under different names. After 25 years in business, he moved his Standard Drug store from 14 Gratiot Avenue to 155 Woodward Avenue and consolidated all locations under the Cunningham's name.

Andrew R. Cunningham ran the business as a family corporation alongside his wife Matilda Cunningham, who served as Vice-President, and his son Edward A. Cunningham, who served as Secretary-Treasurer. In 1928, Andrew R. Cunningham and Edward A. Cunningham personally commissioned the Cunningham Building at 1120–1134 Griswold Street and 27–31 State Street in downtown Detroit, designed by architect Wirt Rowland of Smith, Hinchman & Grylls and completed in 1929. In 1931, the 50-store Economical Drug chain, also based in Detroit, consolidated with Cunningham, which at the time had thirteen stores. Economical Drug owner Nate Shapero assumed control of the Cunningham chain and Andrew R. Cunningham served as president. Edward A. Cunningham died on June 22, 1936, at the age of 33. Andrew R. Cunningham died on August 15, 1937. The combined company was Economical-Cunningham before shortening to Cunningham. Cunningham announced a merger with Marshall Drug Co. of Cleveland, Ohio in 1940. By October 1956, the company owned four drug store chains that operated 190 units in Michigan, Ohio, Indiana, Pennsylvania, and California.

In 1958, the company purchased seven Broward Drug Stores in Fort Lauderdale, Florida, upping its store count to 198 across six states. It also purchased Kinsel Drug Co. of Detroit in 1959. Following the merger, Cunningham became the largest drugstore chain in Michigan. An effort was made by the United States Department of Justice to dissolve the Kinsel merger, citing that it was in violation of the Clayton Antitrust Act. The dissolution was canceled in 1963. By 1961, there were 206 stores based mainly in the Detroit and Cleveland markets.

An acquisition of Whelan Drug in Florida added fourteen more Cunningham locations to the state in 1964. By 1965, the chain had 214 stores and was considered the second largest in the industry. In 1971, the chain sold 28 Florida stores to Gray Drug of Ohio.

The company ran several drug stores under assumed named in certain markets. Cunningham's also had some small drug stores branded as Schettler's in major hotels, such as the Sheraton-Cadillac in Detroit, and at high-end retail, such as at Somerset Mall in Troy, Michigan. In the 1960s, a small number of Cunningham's were re-branded as Dot Discount, an experiment which did not expand further, but which lasted a couple decades, some years after all Cunningham's had closed in the Detroit area.

The chain sold off 29 of its Michigan stores in 1982 to a private company, which re-branded them as Apex Drug. Three years later, most of the Apex locations were sold to Perry Drug Stores, another chain based in the Detroit metropolitan area.

The remaining Cunningham stores were gradually sold off or shuttered. By late 1991, the last five in operation, all in the Fort Lauderdale, Florida area, were sold to Walgreens.

== Legacy ==
In 2026, Edward A. Cunningham, a fourth-generation direct lineal descendant of founder Andrew R. Cunningham, established The Cunningham 1928 LLC in Michigan to revive the Cunningham brand commercially. Federal trademark applications were filed with the United States Patent and Trademark Office under Serial Numbers 99659301 and 99682330, covering real estate and hospitality services respectively. The LLC has announced it is actively seeking Michigan locations to launch Cunningham's as a hospitality brand, with a planned expansion timed to coincide with the brand's 140th anniversary in 2029 and the centennial of the founding family's original Detroit construction project.
