= QFI (supermarket) =

Former supermarket chain based in San Francisco

QFI was a San Francisco supermarket chain founded in the late 1940s by John Musso. Originally, some QFI locations were leased, resulting in some stores being co-named with others (such as Lick Super Market). By the 1970s, when Musso's son Leo took over, all QFI stores were wholly owned and operated. QFI peaked as the number three grocery chain in the region, behind Safeway and Lucky, and had about 14 locations ranging from San Francisco south to Redwood City.

In 1973, QFI was acquired by Cala Foods, which itself was acquired by Ralphs (a subsidiary of Kroger) in the 1990s. In August 2006, Ralphs reached an agreement to sell 11 of 13 Cala Food and Bell Market stores back to Harley DeLano, previous manager of the Cala chain. In January 2007, DeLano Retail Partners took control of all but one Cala Foods Store and immediately rebranded the stores to DeLano's IGA. In late 2010, it was announced that Delano's was struggling financially and that the majority of DeLano's IGA locations would be closing.

== Previous Locations ==
Redwood City, Millbrae, San Francisco, South San Francisco 2 locations, San Mateo Serramonte

== See also ==
- Petrini's
