= The Village at Totem Lake =

- Location: Kirkland, Washington
- Coordinates: 47.7125°N 122.1808°W
- Opened: May 30, 1973 as Totem Lake Mall; October 20, 2017 as The Village at Totem Lake
- Developer: Puget Sound Land Company (1970s); CenterCal Properties, LLC (2010s)
- Owner: Village at Totem Lake, LLC
- Num. of stores: 63
- Num. of anchor tenants: 5
- Floor area: 360,000 sq. ft.
- Floors: 2
- Website: https://www.thevillageattotemlake.com/

The Village at Totem Lake, formerly Totem Lake Mall, is a shopping center in Kirkland, Washington, United States. The center of Totem Lake Mall consisted of an enclosed shopping mall (Lower Mall), and an adjacent strip mall (Upper Mall). Collectively, the two centers were sometimes referred to as "Totem Lake Malls". Following the redevelopment of major regional malls beginning in the 1980s, Totem Lake Mall went into steady decline, losing most of its major tenants. The majority of these tenants were only accessible on the outside, shying away from the interior mall concept popular throughout the 1960s-1990s. Multiple redevelopments for the property were proposed. Village At Totem Lake, LLC purchased the mall in 2015 and in 2016 announced it would be redeveloped and reopened as The Village at Totem Lake.

Today, The Village at Totem Lake includes retail, restaurants, office space, and on-site residential to create a mixed-use center. Major tenants include Cinemark, Whole Foods Market, Trader Joe's, Nordstrom Rack, Ross Dress for Less, and Barnes & Noble. The first Sweetgreen location in the Pacific Northwest opened at the mall in 2024.

== History ==
=== Development ===
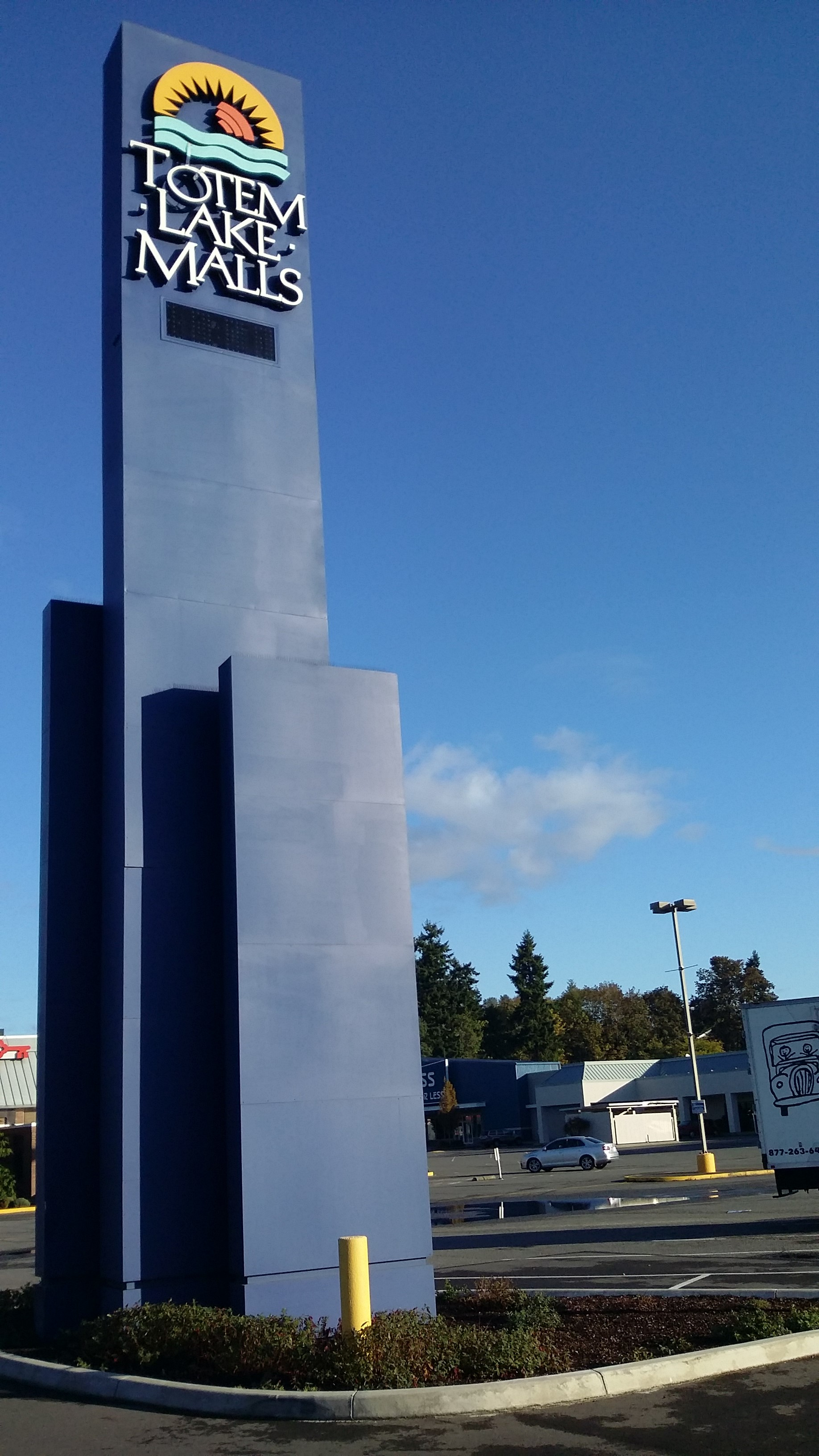
The sign tower with a hidden totem pole

Originally called the Totem Lake Center, the mall was first proposed in early 1968 to take advantage of a prominent site along the newly constructed Interstate 405 and ground was broken in June 1972. The mall was the second phase of a larger Totem Lake center project including the EvergreenHealth campus and nearby apartment complexes, all developed by Totem Lake, Inc. around the small lake of the same name, originally known as Lake Watstine. The mall itself and much of the surrounding properties were built on reclaimed wetlands connected to the lake. The mall was designed with an "Indian longhouse theme" featuring elements of Northwest Coast art by Richard C. Bouillon & Co., the same firm that designed the Lake Forest Park Center in 1964 in a chalet theme. John Graham & Company were in charge of designing the interior. Although the opening of the mall was originally scheduled for April 1, 1973, the first stores in the mall wouldn't open until May 2, and the rest of the lower mall until May 31, 1973. The mall's 40,000-square-foot (3,700 m^{2}) Lamonts Anchor tenant/department store, the sixth in the Pay 'n Save Corporation-owned chain, was still under construction at the time, and would not open until October 17 of that year. Additional anchor stores at the mall included other divisions of the Pay 'n Save Corporation including Ernst Home & Nursery, Schuck's Auto Supply, a Pay 'n Save Drug store and Sportsland, later acquired by Big 5 Sporting Goods. Construction of the separate eastern portion of the mall continued into 1974, and the East Mall was opened in July 1974. Construction of the mall would lead to the annexation of the Totem Lake Neighborhood by the city of Kirkland in 1974. The adjacent Totem Lake Cinemas opened in 1980.

=== Decline ===
In the summer of 1988, the upper and lower malls' original exposed wood facades and finishes were covered and the buildings were re-sheathed with a white Exterior insulation finishing system as part of a renovation project that was intended to modernize and brighten the appearance of the malls. Many people criticized this new look deeming it boring and bland in contrast to the previous eclectic theme.

A huge snow storm in 1997 caused part of the lower mall's roof to cave in, triggering the sprinklers and flooding the entire building in 3 inches (76 mm) of water. Because of water damage, the mall's original wood parquet flooring was replaced with ceramic tile.

A totem pole from the mall's original construction was thought to be hidden inside a sign tower on the mall's west side, though in reality what remained were plain wooden poles that once held the malls' original sign featuring an eagle with outstretched wings in the Northwest Coast art tradition. The poles were left in place during redevelopment to take advantage of a grandfather clause in the city's sign height limits but the fate of the original hand-carved sign is unknown.

The first blow to the mall occurred in late 1996 when anchor Ernst Home & Nursery closed as part of the company's bankruptcy. The space eventually was divided into three stores, Ross, Famous Footwear and Cartoys, and given a remodel that contrasted greatly with the rest of the mall. This part of the mall remained consistently occupied while the rest of the lower mall continued to languish. Due to the financial struggles of its owners and a steady loss of inside tenants since the early 2000s the shopping center was becoming known as a dead mall and very little maintenance was done to fix the leaking roofs and other problems. The deteriorating mall had been described as a "white elephant" and was seen as an eyesore by locals and city planners. The East mall in contrast still thrived thanks to the traffic generated by Trader Joe's, the theater, and several specialty stores.

The main mall had many vacant spaces where anchor tenants used to be, such as Lamonts (later Gottschalks). In November 2006, the Rite Aid drugstore moved out of the mall to a free standing location up the street. CompUSA closed in May 2007. The Old Country Buffet closed in September 2008 due to chapter 11 bankruptcy consolidation leaving only one store with an entrance into the mall. The last major vacancy occurred in March 2010 when one of the mall's only original remaining tenants, Schuck's Auto Parts, acquired and renamed by O'Reilly Auto Parts, relocated off the mall property. The economic downturn of 2008 prevented any attempts to revive the mall as it stood and its only new tenants during this time consisted of flea markets and seasonal pop-up stores.

== Sale and redevelopment ==
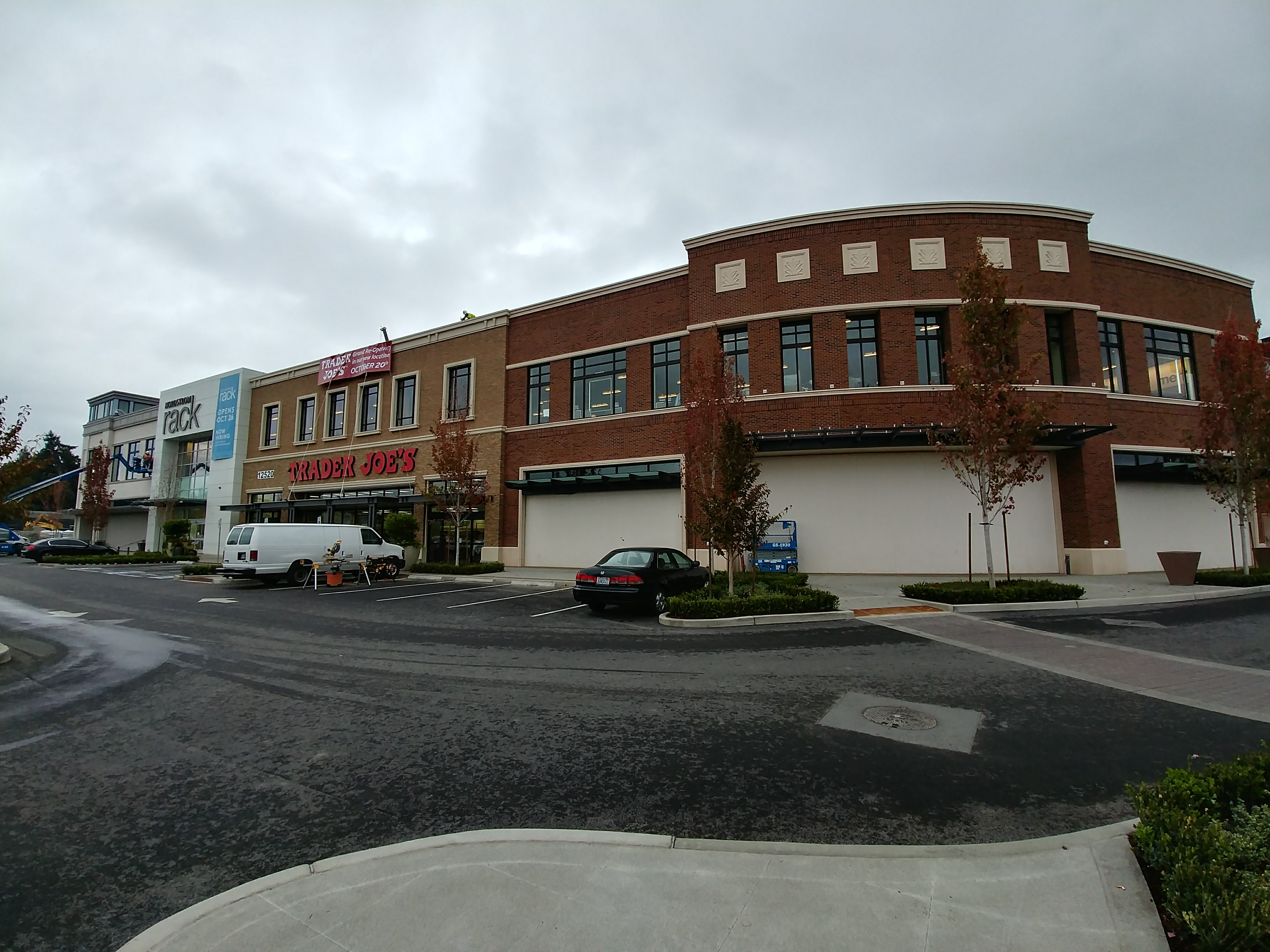
The Village at Totem Lake just prior to 2017 reopening

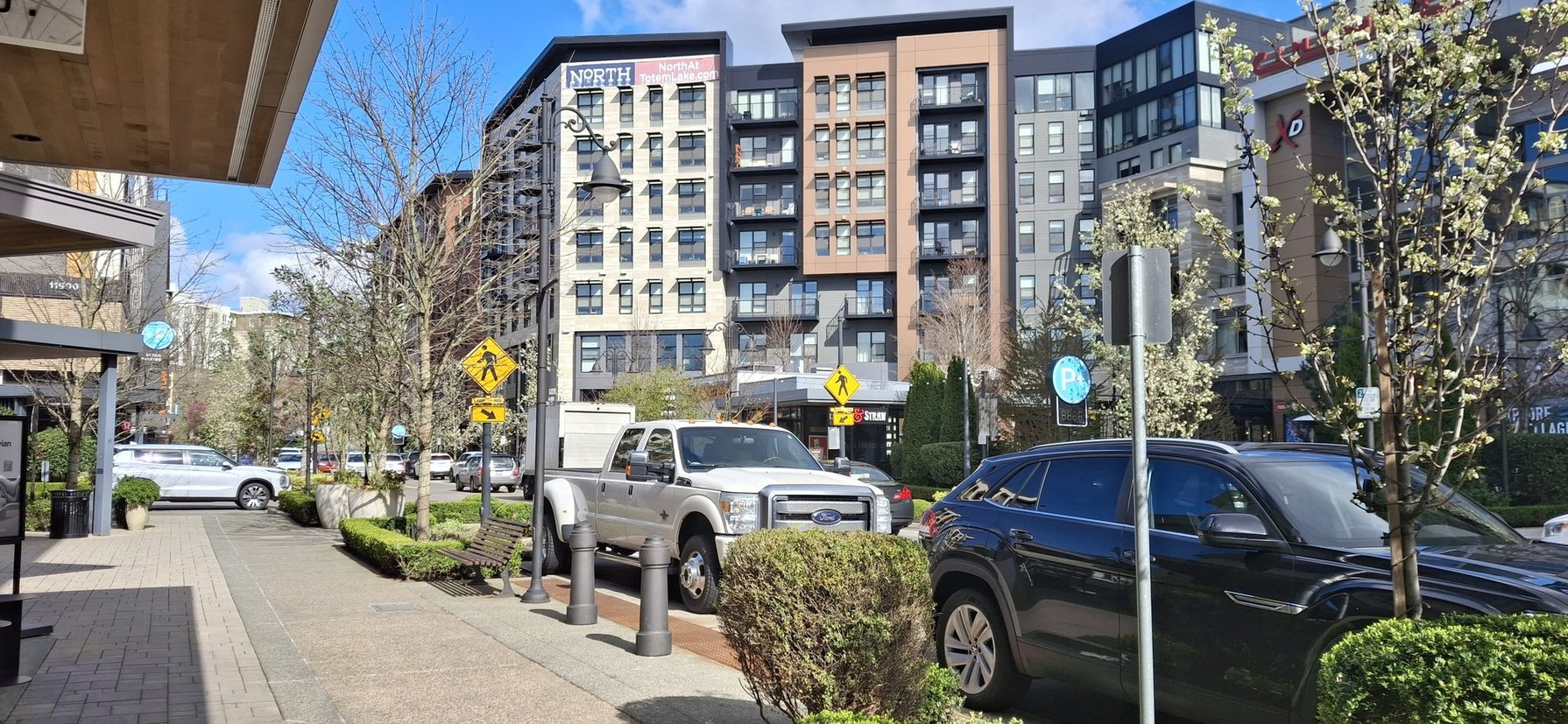
The Village at Totem Lake in 2026

In January 2004, the mall was sold by CalPERS to Developers Diversified Realty (DDR) for $37 million. DDR had discussed plans to tear it down and redevelop a multistory, mixed residential-retail complex. As of February 2008, the City of Kirkland had not received an application for design review and did not know the planned mix of tenants, although the city did receive a conceptual master plan. In February 2009, it was revealed that due to the harsh economic climate, DDR had postponed its redevelopment plans for the mall indefinitely and was searching for someone to buy the property.

In early 2015, Totem Lake Mall was sold to Village at Totem Lake LLC, a joint venture between CenterCal and PCCP, LLC. A $200 million, 12-month redevelopment of the mall was announced to begin in mid-2016, with the new mall opening in the summer of 2017. In March 2016, the mall's owner began demolishing the lower mall, with the exception of the former Ernst space which is now occupied by Car Toys and Ross; Trader Joe's took up the remaining space after construction was completed in December 2017. The upper mall and its former movie theater were next in line for demolition. The new complex, named The Village at Totem Lake, was planned for 800+ residential units, office spaces, and entertainment venues in addition to retail space.

Since opening its first new tenants, Nordstrom Rack and Trader Joe's, in October 2017, The Village at Totem Lake has continued to expand and open new retailers, restaurant, offices, movie theater, plus on-site residential communities opened.
