= Pay 'n Save =

American retail company

Pay 'n Save Corporation
- Type: Private (1940–1964; 1984–1987); Public (1964–1984; 1987–1988); Subsidiary (1988–1992)
- Industry: Retail
- Founded: 1940; 86 years ago, in Seattle, Washington, United States
- Founder: Monte Lafayette Bean
- Defunct: 1992
- Fate: Acquired by PayLess Drug
- Headquarters: Seattle, Washington, United States
- Number of locations: 124 (1992)
- Area served: Western United States
- Key people: M. Lamont Bean (president (1959–1984))
- Products: Pharmacy and General Merchandise
- Number of employees: 3,500 (1992)
- Subsidiaries: Pay 'n Save Drugs, Ernst/Malmo Nursery, Bi-Mart, Lamonts, Sportswest, Schuck's Auto Supply, Yard Birds, Von Tobel's, Price Savers Warehouse

Pay 'n Save Corporation was a retail company founded by Monte Lafayette Bean in Seattle, Washington, in 1940. Over the years, Pay 'n Save was the leading drugstore chain in Washington and was the owner of several Washington-based retailers, including Lamonts and Ernst. A 1984 sale of the company to the Trump Group and a 1986 attempt to transform the retailer into a bargain-basement merchandiser resulted in a loss of nearly $50 million. By 1988, Pay 'n Save was sold to Thrifty Corporation, who later sold the stores to PayLess Drug, who retired the Pay 'n Save name. As a result, most of the retailer's divisions were spun off as separate companies or shuttered. As of 2023, Pay 'n Save's membership discount chain, Bi-Mart, is the sole surviving division of the company (the chain has been an employee-owned company since 2003).

At the company's peak, Pay 'n Save was operating 313 stores in ten western states, Canada and Great Britain under several different names, including Pay 'n Save, Ernst, Bi-Mart, Lamonts, Sportswest, Schuck's Auto Supply, Yard Birds, Von Tobel's, and Price Savers.

== History ==
=== Founding; company acquisitions ===
In 1940, businessman Monte Lafayette Bean arrived in Seattle, Washington, from Portland, Oregon, to take over Tradewell Stores, Inc., a chain of grocery stores. By 1947, Bean and his son, M. Lamont Bean, opened the first Pay 'n Save drug store at Fourth Avenue and Pike Street in Seattle.

In March 1959, M. Lamont Bean became the president of Pay 'n Save and began considering operating other stores that were not pharmacies. Shortly after, Bean began an interest in Ernst Hardware, a local hardware chain owned by Seattle brothers Fred and Charles Ernst. Fred Ernst agreed to sell Ernst Hardware and its nine locations to Pay 'n Save in February 1960. In 1962, Pay 'n Save acquired Malmo Nursery and began opening Ernst-Malmo combination stores; combining hardware, lumber, garden supplies, and nursery items in one building. The first Ernst-Malmo combination store was opened at the University Village shopping center in Seattle. By 1982, Ernst was operating 68 hardware stores.

In 1965, Pay 'n Save acquired the Rhodes department stores chain. Pay 'n Save shuttered the Rhodes flagship store in Seattle during 1968. The Rhodes name was retired from the suburban branches when M. Lamont Bean renamed the stores Lamonts in 1970. During 1976, Pay 'n Save acquired discount chains Bi-Mart and Yard Birds.

=== Death of founder; Trump Group takeover ===
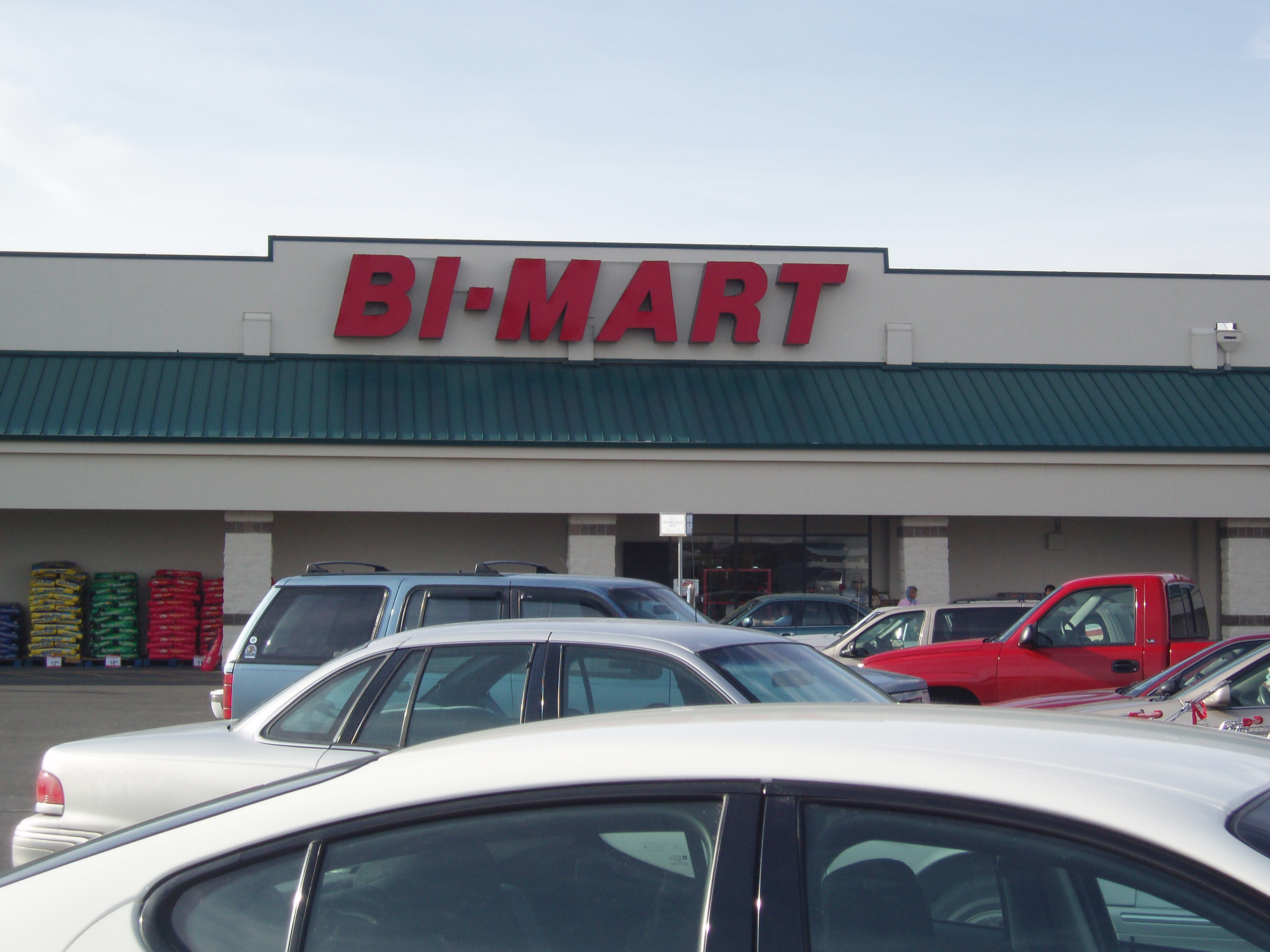
A Bi-Mart store in Ontario, Oregon

In October 1982, company founder Monte Lafayette Bean died at age 83. In 1983, Pay 'n Save entered the wholesale club business and opened the first Price Savers Warehouse in Salt Lake City, Utah. In December 1983, Pay 'n Save acquired Schuck's Auto Supply, Inc. for about $70 million in Pay 'n Save common stock. At the time, Schuck's had 58 stores in Washington, Oregon, and Idaho.

In September 1984, the Pay 'n Save board voted to sell the retailer and to give a lockup option on $4.1 million shares to the Trump Group (no relation to New York real estate developer Donald Trump) in an effort to stave off other bids.

Pay 'n Save's largest shareholders, Stuart Sloan and Samuel N. Stroum, vowed to fight the sale of the retail company. Sloan and Stroum, who owned 18 percent of Pay 'n Save's stock, issued a statement telling shareholders not to "be stampeded into acting hastily". On September 12, 1984, The Trump Group announced that it had withdrawn its offer to purchase Pay 'n Save in order to negotiate with Sloan and Stroum. On October 15, 1984, Pay 'n Save was officially sold to the Trumps for $358 million.

=== Sale of subsidiaries ===
A closed Ernst store in Boise, Idaho

The company's sporting goods chain, Sportswest, was spun off in 1984 before being closed completely. After a brief period, Thrifty Corporation reopened the stores under the Big 5 Sporting Goods name. Sportswest was the first of several Pay 'n Save division to be sold over the next few years.

In May 1985, Pay 'n Save announced it would put all its subsidiaries up for sale. During this time, Dayton-Hudson division Mervyns was expected to acquire the company's 20 Lamonts stores and Southland Corporation, then-owner of 7-Eleven, expressed interest in acquiring all 58 Schuck's Auto Supply stores. The first subsidiary to be sold was Price Savers Warehouse, in August 1985, to Cincinnati, Ohio-based Kroger.

On November 1, 1985, Pay 'n Save successfully spun off Bi-Mart, Lamonts, and Schuck's to form a new company, Northern Pacific Corporation. With all divisions combined, the new company had sales of about $450 million, making it one of the Northwest's largest retail operations. Just eight days later, Pay 'n Save's flagship drugstore chain became controlled by a company equally owned by the Trump Group and a partnership headed by William Zimmerman, owner of California discount chain Pic 'N' Save. The sale left Pay 'n Save with 69 Ernst Home Center stores, three Yard Birds stores, and wholesaler Northwestern Drug Co. By January 1986, Pay 'n Save Corp. was renamed Seattle Standard Corp.

=== Return as a public company ===
After 19 months as a privately held company, Pay 'n Save announced plans to return as a public company in May 1986. The company planned to sell 3 million shares at from $16 to $18 a share. As part of the transaction, the company purchased Bi-Mart, a former division of the original Pay 'n Save Corp. The original company sold its first shares of common stock to the general public in 1962 and reverted to private ownership in October 1984.

On May 15, 1986, days after announcing plans to go public again, Pay 'n Save announced it would be taking on a new image and announced plans to remodel its 108 stores, which would include a new blue-and-green paint scheme. The company also announced its new emphasis on bargain goods and plans to raise $225 million by selling convertible bonds and 10-year notes.

In June 1986, Pic 'N' Save, filed a lawsuit against Pay 'n Save's investment banker, contending that materials outlining Pay 'n Save's stock offering misrepresent the role of Pic 'N' Save's former chairman, William Zimmerman. When Zimmerman left Pic 'N' Save in August 1984, he agreed not work for a competing company for one year, but the company's interests had been attempting to determine whether Zimmerman violated the agreement. The suit, filed in state Superior Court in Los Angeles, said that the "Zimmerman merchandising strategy", a key part in Pay 'n Save's business plan, includes Pic 'N' Save trade secrets and other confidential information. On July 1, 1986, Pic 'N' Save had filed a civil lawsuit against Pay 'n Save, William Zimmerman, and related parties, asking for more than $50 million compensatory damages and $50 million in punitive damages.

By the end of July 1986, Zimmerman and the Trumps again turned Pay 'n Save into a public company by selling $52 million (~$129 million in 2025) in stock, despite a dramatic decline in sales since they took over. The company later reported a $12.8 million loss in the first quarter ending August 2. Mike Reynolds, senior reporter for New York industry publication Chain Drug Review, blamed the company's decline on Zimmerman's approach displaying tables of low-cost imported items. By December, the company's president, Maynard Jenkins, resigned for a job in California and the company's discounted items would no longer be carried.

=== Return to old format ===
In January 1987, Pay 'n Save reported a loss of nearly $50 million in the last year. At the time, chief executive Gerald Nathanson said Pay 'n Save management believes a new merchandising strategy and restructuring "will strengthen Pay ' n Save and improve its future performance significantly". In February 1987, Pay 'n Save announced the closure of all stores in Montana and Wyoming.

In June 1987, Pay 'n Save revealed its "back to basics" merchandising plan. The chain planned to revert their 106 drug stores back to the familiar blue-and-green color scheme, complete with new signs, and better lighting. The company's stores would focus on departments such as candy and snacks, stationery, household chemicals and greeting cards, while the pharmacies would remain the foundation of each store. The company's remodeling process was blamed for a loss of $9.6 million in the company's third quarter.

=== Thrifty Corporation and PayLess Drug ===
In April 1988, Pay 'n Save was put up for sale. The sale attracted interest from Thrifty Corporation, who previously acquired Sportswest from Pay 'n Save in 1984. On May 13, Thrifty announced plans to acquire the company's 110 Pay 'n Save drug stores and 37 Bi-Mart discount stores for stock worth $232 million. Thrifty also announced plans to keep the Pay 'n Save and Bi-Mart names and the company's current employees. In the previous year, Pay 'n Save was left with a $27 million loss and a $49 million loss in 1986.

In August 1988, Gerald Nathanson, Pay 'n Save president and CEO, resigned from the company. Richard Dortch, who began working with Pay 'n Save as a store clerk in 1969, was elected president of the 124-drugstore chain in January 1991.

By February 1992, Pay 'n Save was once again for sale. Days prior to the February 5 announcement, the company announced a loss of $88 million after a $250 million after-tax special charge. By March, PayLess Drug Stores, a then subsidiary of Kmart, emerged as a possible buyer for some or all Pay 'n Save 125 drugstores. PayLess officials were not able to comment at the time.

In June 1992, PayLess Drug Stores officially acquired the money-losing Pay 'n Save drug stores from Thrifty Corporation. Leonard Green & Partners, a Los Angeles investment firm that specializes in management buyouts agreed to acquire Thrifty Corporation's other division, including Pay 'n Save's Bi-Mart. Following the sale, the Pay 'n Save stores were renamed PayLess Drug.

M. Lamont Bean, the company's president from 1959 to 1984, died on February 5, 2004, at age 79.

In 2023, Rite Aid, the successor to PayLess Drug, filed for Chapter 11 bankruptcy. On May 5, 2025, Rite Aid filed for Chapter 11 bankruptcy for the second time in 2 years, listing assets and liabilities between $1 billion and $10 billion. Rite Aid will sell all of its assets as part of its procedure, as it overcomes financial challenges such as debt, increased competition, and inflation, including PayLess Drug.

== Former subsidiaries ==
- Bi-Mart: Bi-Mart's parent company, Thrifty PayLess was sold to Rite Aid in October 1996 for $1.3 billion. Rite Aid sold Bi-Mart to Endeavour Capital in 1997. By 2004, Endeavour Capital transferred ownership of the company to its employees through an employee stock ownership plan. The chain is last operating former Pay n' Save subsidiary.
- Ernst Home Centers: Ernst went public in 1994 in a bid to raise $50 million to open 55 superstores. Tough competition from larger stores forced the company to file for Chapter 11 bankruptcy in July 1996 and close 33 stores. The company suffered more losses and announced the closure of its remaining 53 stores in November 1996.
- Lamonts: In August 1989, Northern Pacific sold the chain to Scottsdale, Arizona-based Aris Corporation for $135 million. Lamonts filed for Chapter 11 bankruptcy in January 1995 and once more in January 2000. In April 2000, California-based Gottschalks purchased Lamonts' store leases for $19 million (~$33.7 million in 2025). The $19 million deal did not include Lamonts inventory, which was sold off. Gottschalks eventually filed for Chapter 11 bankruptcy and liquidated in mid-2009 during the late-2000s recession.
- Price Savers Warehouse: Only three years after buying Price Savers, Kroger sold the 16-unit chain to a management-led investment group in September 1988. Kmart's Pace Membership Warehouse division acquired Price Savers for an undisclosed amount of cash in January 1991. Pace was eventually absorbed in Wal-Mart's Sam's Club division in 1993.
- Schuck's Auto Supply: In 1987, Jules and Eddie Trump combined Schuck's, Kragen Auto Parts, and Checker Auto Parts to form Northern Automotive, later renamed CSK Auto. CSK Auto made a public offering of its stock in 1998 and became to first major auto parts retailer to sell products on the internet in 1999. O'Reilly Auto Parts, the third largest U.S. auto parts chain, acquired CSK Auto for $528 million in 2008. O'Reilly converted all CSK Auto-owned stores to the O'Reilly name shortly after.

=== Yard Birds ===
Yard Birds was originally a surplus store started in 1947 in Centralia, Washington. There were also Yard Birds stores in Chehalis, Olympia, and Shelton. While originally selling war surplus, Yard Birds became more of a discount store with many departments, including hardware, toys, shoes and clothing, automotive, pets, sporting goods, furniture, a full-service grocery, and more. Yard Birds stores had a logo that featured a black bird with a yellow beak, reminiscent of the cartoon characters Heckle and Jeckle. In 1987, Seattle Standard sold the chain to its employees through an employee stock ownership plan. Rich Gillingham, co-founder of Yard Birds, died in 1992. The company closed one store in 1993 and closed its last two stores in 1995.

The Chehalis store was more than 300,000 square feet (28,000 m^{2}) and was considered, by the early owners, the largest surplus outfit on the West Coast. In 1971, the site became home to a 100 foot (30 metres) statute of a black bird that was large enough for automobiles to drive through. Accidentally burned down in 1976, the Yard Birds location added a replacement statue, and smaller works of the same, over the years. The store was the focus of a documentary, Skinny and Fatty: The Story of Yard Birds. The Chehalis store was converted to a vendor mall and storage space under the Yard Birds name, before closing permanently in 2022. Beginning in April 2024, abandoned and unclaimed inventory was removed from the building and placed in the parking lot. With some exceptions, items were given away for free to the public.
