= Ernst Home Centers =

Chain of home improvement retail stores

Ernst Home Centers, Inc.
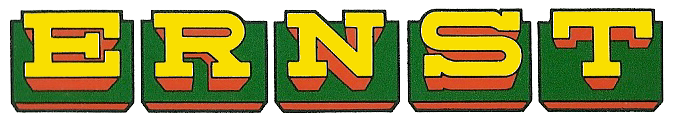
- Type: Home improvement retail
- Founded: 1893; 133 years ago in Seattle, Washington
- Founders: Fred and Charles Ernst
- Defunct: 1996
- Fate: Liquidation
- Headquarters: Seattle, Washington
- Number of locations: 53 (1996)
- Areas served: Western United States
- Products: Lumber; Tools; Hardware; Garden supplies; Plants
- Number of employees: 2,000 (1996)
- Parent: Pay 'n Save
- Subsidiaries: Malmo Nursery

Ernst Home Centers, Inc. was a chain of home improvement retail stores founded in Seattle, Washington, United States. Ernst was started in 1893 by Seattle brothers Charles and Fred Ernst. In 1960, it became a division of Pay 'n Save, one of the largest retail companies in the Northwest. After a 1984 takeover of Pay 'n Save, Ernst was sold off and went public in 1994. Following several highly publicized lawsuits and a failed attempt to open larger stores, the company filed for Chapter 11 bankruptcy in 1996 and liquidated in early 1997. At the company's peak, it operated 95 stores in 12 western U.S. states.

== History ==
An empty Ernst location in Boise, Idaho.

=== Founding ===
In 1893, brothers Charles and Fred Ernst started Ernst Hardware in Seattle, Washington. In 1907, the new company was incorporated as Ernst Hardware and Plumbing Co. and moved to 512 Pike Street in downtown Seattle.

During the 1950s, M. Lamont Bean, president of Seattle-based drugstore chain Pay 'n Save, expressed the possibility of operating non-drugstore businesses. Bean later took interest in Ernst and, in February 1960, came to an agreement with Fred Ernst to buy his nine hardware stores. Two years later, Pay 'n Save acquired Malmo Nursery and began opening Ernst-Malmo combination stores; combining hardware, lumber, garden supplies, and nursery items in one building.

=== Trump Group ===
In September 1984, The Trump Group, led by New York investors Julius and Edmond Trump (no relation to Donald Trump) attempted to acquire Pay 'n Save for $355 million. Pay 'n Save's largest shareholders, Stuart Sloan and Samuel N. Stroum, vowed to fight the sale of the retail company. On September 12, 1984, The Trump Group announced that it had withdrawn its offer to purchase Ernst's parent company in order to negotiate with Sloan and Stroum. On October 15, 1984, Pay 'n Save was officially sold to the Trumps for $358 million (~$912 million in 2024). The future of Ernst was put at risk in May 1985 when Pay 'n Save announced plans to sell off all of its subsidiaries. On November 8, 1985, Pay 'n Save's drugstore chain became controlled by a company equally owned by the Trump Group and a partnership headed by William Zimmerman, owner of California discount chain Pic 'N' Save. The sale left Pay 'n Save with 69 Ernst stores, three Yard Birds stores and wholesaler Northwestern Drug Co. In January 1986, Pay 'n Save was renamed Seattle Standard Corp. In March 1986, Hal Smith, former president of Irvine, California-based Builders Emporium, succeeded Mike Rouleau as president and CEO of Ernst.

In 1987 and 1988, Ernst remodeled and upgraded all of its stores and, in late 1990, tested a new concept store in West Seattle. The new concept featured garden-like nurseries, an espresso cart, wider aisles, expanded merchandise, brighter signs and other modern amenities. Ernst opened two more of the new concept stores in Lynnwood, Washington and Spokane, Washington in 1991.

=== Early 1990s lawsuits ===
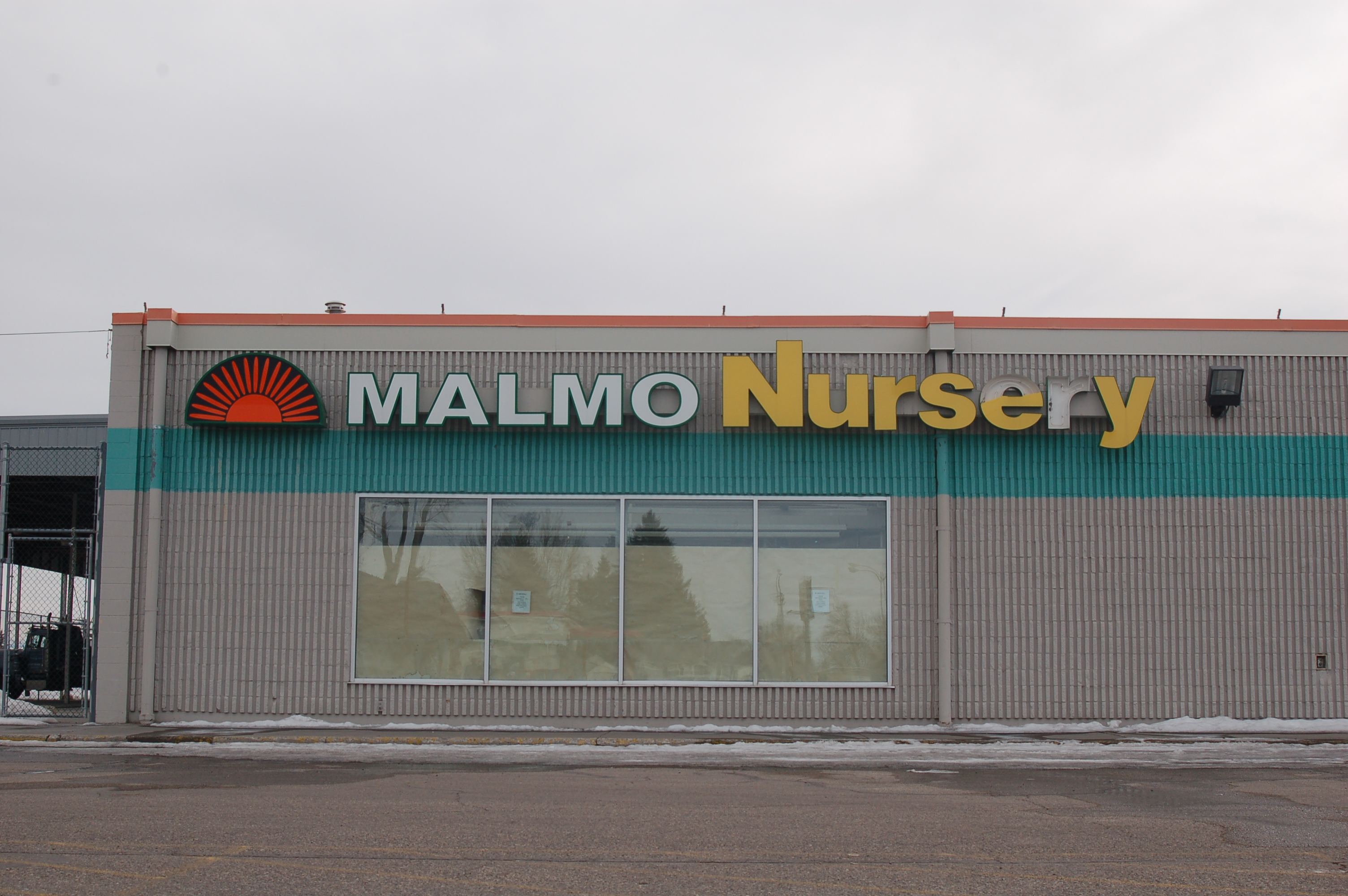
An empty Malmo Nursery in Idaho Falls, Idaho.

In April 1992, Ernst filed a lawsuit against retailer Wal-Mart claiming the discount chain stole Ernst's registered advertising slogan ("Always the right price. Always."). Ernst asked the court to force Wal-Mart to stop using their slogan and pay unspecified damages to the retailer.

Three months later, Ernst sued another retailer, Seattle-based home improvement chain Eagle Hardware & Garden, for unfair competition and violation of the state's Consumer Protection Act. The company claimed Eagle's comparisons of prices for various products were false and deceptive. Eagle, in turn, accused Ernst of also misleading consumers with its advertising and defamation for suing Eagle just before the newly formed company went public.

At the same time of the Eagle suit, Ernst went after Pay 'n Save, accusing it of illegal competition for selling nursery products in 15 Washington shopping centers the two retailers operated in. Ernst had contracts with the owners of the 15 shopping centers to be the primary or exclusive seller of nursery products in them. PayLess Drug Stores, who had then-recently acquired Pay 'n Save, hit the chain with a counterclaim, which accused Ernst of selling camera film and film-processing services at eight shopping centers where PayLess had the sole right to sell those services.

Shortly after the suits against the three retailers, the state of Washington sued Ernst on charges that it failed to objectively portray prices at competitors Pay 'n Pak and Home Club in a 1990 advertising campaign. In a settlement made in October 1992, Ernst admitted no wrongdoing but agreed to pay $19,500 (~$39,025 in 2024) in court costs, consumer education and to enforce the Consumer Protection Act.

In November 1992, Ernst filed a lawsuit against United Food and Commercial Workers Local 1001 following several months of union complaints against the retail chain. Union complaints about off-the-clock work and unlawful pay practices prompted the chain to file the lawsuit alleging defamation and consumer protection violations by the union and its legal counsel. In March 1993, the union filed a class-action lawsuit against Ernst, charging the retailer with failing to pay employees for work done on their own time. The union, representing 450 of Ernst's Seattle area employees, had been boycotting the hardware chain since November 1992 when their contract expired on November 1. The union sued Ernst again in August 1993 for knowingly selling toilets that violate state water conservation requirements. Ernst later announced it would stop selling the specific toilets.

=== Decline ===
In June 1994, Ernst announced plans to go public and to raise $50 million (~$95.7 million in 2024) through a stock sale to open 55 superstores over the next three years. The company began opening the superstores, averaged at 60,000 square feet (5,600 m^{2}), in 1991. At the time, Ernst was operating 77 stores in eight U.S. states. Ernst later delayed their initial stock offering, but later resumed their offering and went public in September 1994.In January 1996, Ernst reported a $47.6 million (~$87.6 million in 2024) loss in its fourth-quarter, nearly twice what the retailer made in the past four years. At the same time, Ernst announced the cancellation of plans for 13 new stores and the closure of nine stores. On July 12, 1996, Ernst filed for Chapter 11 bankruptcy and announced the closure of 25 stores. The filing came after Ernst reported a loss of nearly $116 million in the company's past three quarters. On November 12, despite the chain's attempt to remain in business, Ernst announced it would close its remaining 53 stores and sell off the remainder of its operations. At the time, Ernst was operating 53 stores in six U.S. states and had about 2,000 full and part-time employees. Ernst began its final going-out-of-business sale on November 23.

== Malmo Nursery ==
Charles Malmo, an immigrant from Norway, founded a seed store on Second Avenue in Seattle in 1893. Malmo was credited with being first in the Northwest to propagate and grow his own nursery stock rather than import ornamental shrubs from Japan, the Netherlands and England. In 1930, he opened the first "garden department store" on the Pacific Coast, selling all that was needed for the "most elaborate garden, from seeds to large trees," as he humbly asserted during the opening festivities. His son Clark bought 30 acres (120,000 m^{2}) to cultivate at the present site of University Village shopping mall. Many of the mature yards surrounding old Laurelhurst homes in Seattle today were the work of the Malmos. In 1962, the Malmos sold their business to Pay 'n Save and became a wholly owned subsidiary, operated by Pay 'n Save as part of its Ernst stores, which were then called Ernst Malmo.
