= Trump Group =

Trump Group may refer to:

- The Trump Group, an organisation run by Donald Trump
- Trump group, a type of card game that includes Euchre, for example
