= CSK Auto =

Independent company acquired by O'Reilly Auto Parts

CSK Auto, Inc.
- Trade name: Checker; Schuck's; Kragen; Murray's
- Formerly: Northern Automotive (1987–1993)
- Founded: 1987; 39 years ago as Northern Automotive
- Defunct: July 11, 2008; 18 years ago (brands phased out and eliminated within 3 years of purchase)
- Fate: Acquired by O'Reilly Auto Parts
- Headquarters: Phoenix, Arizona, United States
- Number of locations: 1,349 (2008)
- Area served: Western United States
- Website: Archive of CSK Auto corporate site at the Wayback Machine (archived July 27, 2008)

CSK Auto, Inc. was a specialty retailer of automotive parts and accessories in the western United States. CSK Auto became a publicly traded company in March 1998, headquartered in Phoenix, Arizona, and grew through a combination of acquisitions and organic growth. It was acquired in 2008 by O'Reilly Automotive. The company took its name from the initials of its three auto parts chains, Checker Auto Parts, Schuck's Auto Supply, and Kragen Auto Parts.

== Operations ==
On January 29, 2006, CSK had operated 1,273 stores in 22 states spanning from Hawaii to Ohio, with principal concentration of stores in the Western United States. CSK operated its stores under four brand names:

- Checker Auto Parts, founded in 1969 in Phoenix, Arizona by Jacob Edward Henegar, with 442 stores in the Southwestern, Rocky Mountain, Upper Midwest states and Hawaii.
- Schucks Auto Supply, founded in 1917, with 226 stores in the Pacific Northwest and Alaska.
- Kragen Auto Parts, founded in 1947 by Al Kragen. Kragen Auto Parts had 493 stores, in California and Northern Nevada.
- Murray's Discount Auto Stores, founded in 1972, with 112 stores in the Great Lakes region.

In the mid-2000s, CSK operated five value concept retail stores under the Pay 'n Save brand name in and around Phoenix, Arizona. These stores sold primarily tools, hardware, sporting goods, housewares and other household goods, and seasonal items. To try and increase the tool business CSK built six stores that combined both auto parts and tools in Michigan, Colorado, Washington, and Arizona. The company ceased operations of the Pay 'n Save stores on August 26, 2007.

CSK sponsored major league baseball in major markets throughout its trade areas, the 2Xtreme Racing monster truck team and the funny car driven by Del Worsham in the National Hot Rod Association. CSK was designated the Official Auto Parts Store of the NHRA.

CSK served both the do-it-yourself ("DIY") and the commercial installer, or do-it-for-me ("DIFM"), customer. The DIY market, which comprises customers who typically repair and maintain vehicles themselves, was the foundation of the business. The DIFM market comprised auto repair professionals, fleet owners, governments and municipalities.

== Retail history ==
CSK Auto was formed after a series of acquisitions in the auto parts space.

In October 1971, Lucky Stores acquired Kragen Auto Supply with its 11 stores in a stock swap. Lucky also acquired Checker Auto Parts when it acquired Yellow Front Stores along with their corporate parent Valley Distributing for $45.9 million in stock in March 1978.

In December 1983, the Pay 'n Save discount retail chain acquired Schuck's Auto Supply with its 58 stores. The merger was finalized on January 1, 1984, for $68.9 million in stock. In September, Eddie and Julius Trump of The Trump Group (no relations to Donald Trump or The Trump Organization) took control of the company. The following year, Pay 'n Save began to divest its non-core businesses. In November 1985, Pay 'n Save spun off Bi-Mart, Lamonts, and Schuck's to form a new company, Northern Pacific Corporation.

In early December 1986, Lucky Stores announced it was selling its Checker Auto Parts and Kragen Auto Parts subsidiaries to the Northern Pacific Corporation, which also operated Schuck's, for $155 million. The combined entity operated 95 Schuck's stores in Oregon, Washington and Idaho, 175 Kragen stores in California and Nevada, and 202 Checker stores across 12 Western states. After the acquisition, the automotive division was briefly known as Checker/Schuck's/Kragen before becoming Northern Automotive. The transaction was completed within three weeks of the announcement.

In February 1988, Northern Automotive acquired 252 Auto Works stores in Michigan, Illinois, Indiana, Wisconsin, Kentucky, Missouri and West Virginia from Perry Drug Stores. The deal also included an automated distribution center in Dayton, Ohio that would be used to expand the Schuck's brand into Kansas City, Missouri. Northern Automotive later sold off the Auto Works chain with its 159 retail stores in Illinois, Indiana, Kentucky, Michigan, Missouri, Ohio and West Virginia to Hahn Automotive Warehouse in November 1993 for $13 million in cash.

In October 1996, Investcorp acquired a controlling interest in CSK Auto (formerly Northern Automotive) after CSK failed to first go public in July 1996. CSK announced in December 1997 that it had filed with the SEC to go public through an initial public offering. The stock debuted in March 1998.

CSK Auto experienced growth through a combination of acquisitions and a program of store construction and expansion. In 1997, CSK acquired 81 Trak Auto stores in Southern California, converting them to the Kragen name and product mix. This led to an extremely productive year in 1998, as annual sales broke the $1 (~$2.00 in 2024)-billion barrier for the first time, and the company opened, expanded, or relocated a total of 130 more stores.

In June 1999, CSK acquired 86 Big Wheel/Rossi Auto Parts stores in Minnesota, North Dakota, and Wisconsin. By August, CSK Auto operated 926 stores in 17 states under the Checker, Schuck's, Kragen and Big Wheel/Rossi names. In October, CSK completed its acquisition of 194 Al's and Grand Auto Supply stores in Washington, California, Idaho, Oregon, Nevada, and Alaska.

In January 2000, CSK and Advance Auto Parts announced a partnership to launch PartsAmerica.com, an automotive parts and accessories e-commerce platform that served all 50 states. To strengthen its position in the Northern Plains states, in April, CSK purchased All-Car Distributors, operators of 21 stores in Wisconsin and one in Michigan. These stores operated under the Checker banner.

In December 2005, CSK acquired Murray's, Inc. and its subsidiary, Murray's Discount Auto Stores. The 110 Murray's automotive-part and accessory retail stores in Michigan, Illinois, Ohio, and Indiana retained the Murray's name and operating model.

In September 2006, CSK announced it had dismissed its chief operating officer and its chief administrative officer, and chief executive Maynard Jenkins would retire, following an investigation that found irregularities in the company's accounting practices. On March 5, 2009 the SEC filed a civil injunction against four former executives of CSK Auto. The employees were charged with accounting fraud for the years of 2002, 2003, and 2004. In November 2011, Jenkins was ordered to give back $2.8 million in bonus and stock profits.

On April 1, 2008, O'Reilly Automotive, Inc. signed a deal to acquire all of CSK's common stock for approximately one billion dollars, including $500 million (~$713 million in 2024) of debt. At the time of the announcement, CSK had a total of 1,349 stores in 22 states operating under the brand names Checker Auto Parts, Schuck's Auto Supply, Kragen Auto Parts, and Murray's Discount Auto Stores. The acquisition was finalize on July 11, 2008. Starting in 2009, O'Reilly gradually rebranded Checker, Schucks, and Kragen stores as O'Reilly Auto Parts stores during a multi-year process that was finally completed in 2011.
