= University Village, Seattle =

Coordinates: 47°39′48″N 122°17′56″W

University Village

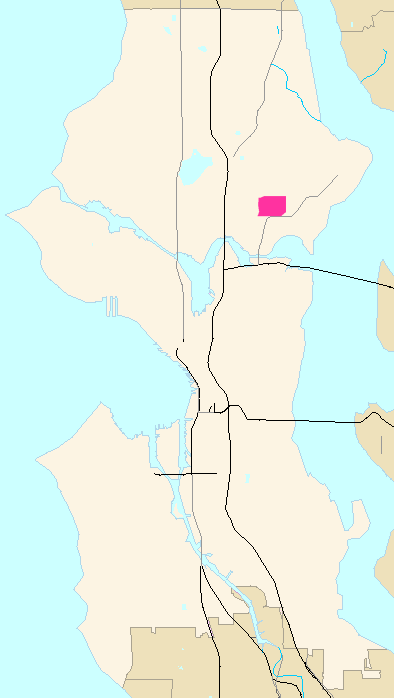
- Location: Seattle, Washington, U.S.
- Opened: 1956; 70 years ago
- Num. of stores: 71
- Num. of anchor tenants: 5
- Floor area: 316,000 square feet (29,400 m^{2})
- Floors: 2
- Website: uvillage.com

University Village (colloquially known as U-Village) is a shopping mall in northeastern Seattle, Washington, United States, located in the south corner of the Ravenna neighborhood to the north of the Downtown area. It is an open-air shopping center which offers restaurants, locally owned boutiques, and national retailers, and is a popular retail destination in the region for home furnishings, popular fashions, gift items, and restaurants. It is owned by developer Stuart Sloan.

== History ==
=== Creation ===
University Village was originally developed by Continental Inc. who also developed Westwood Village in West Seattle and Aurora Village in Shoreline, Washington. it was once home to a Coast Salish village named sluʔwiɫ, which means "Little Canoe Channel" in Lushootseed.

The 24-acre (9.7 ha) shopping center was built in 1956 across NE 45th Street on an earlier part of the Montlake Landfill (since 1911, 1922–1966), taking out what remained of the Union Bay Marsh that was drained by the lowering of Lake Washington as a result of the opening of the Lake Washington Ship Canal (1913–1916). Some wetland was later partially restored as the Union Bay Natural Area with the Center for Urban Horticulture.

=== Early history ===
Until the early 1990s, the character of University Village was decidedly different. Most of its businesses were small, and the chain stores were all local: Ernst Hardware and Malmo Nursery, Lamonts department store (acquired by Gottschalks in 2000), Pay 'n Save Drugs (sold to PayLess Drug in the early 1990s), and QFC supermarket, then a much smaller facility on the western side of the property, formerly an A&P store. The present QFC store on the east edge opened in 1996, it was formerly a dairy facility from 1955 to 1991.

There was even a bowling alley, Village Lanes, which was originally a roller rink in the 1950s, located near the northwest corner. Many of the businesses began to falter toward the end of the 1980s, however, and in 1993 the owners of the mall decided to sell. For much of this period, University Village was owned by the Tektronix Retirement Investment Fund.

=== Modern ===
QFC chairman Stuart Sloan and his business partner Matt Griffin bought the property, and other tenants began to move out. Barnes & Noble was an anchor tenant after the mid-1990s renovation, but closed at the end of 2011.

University Village began to attract upscale retailers in the 1990s and 2000s after its renovation into a lifestyle center with outdoor spaces. Despite the influx of new national retailers, 61% of U-Village merchants are still local. The mall expanded to 600,000 square feet (56,000 m^{2}) by the early 2020s. Simon Property Group announced plans in 2026 to acquire University Village from Sloan.

== Shops ==
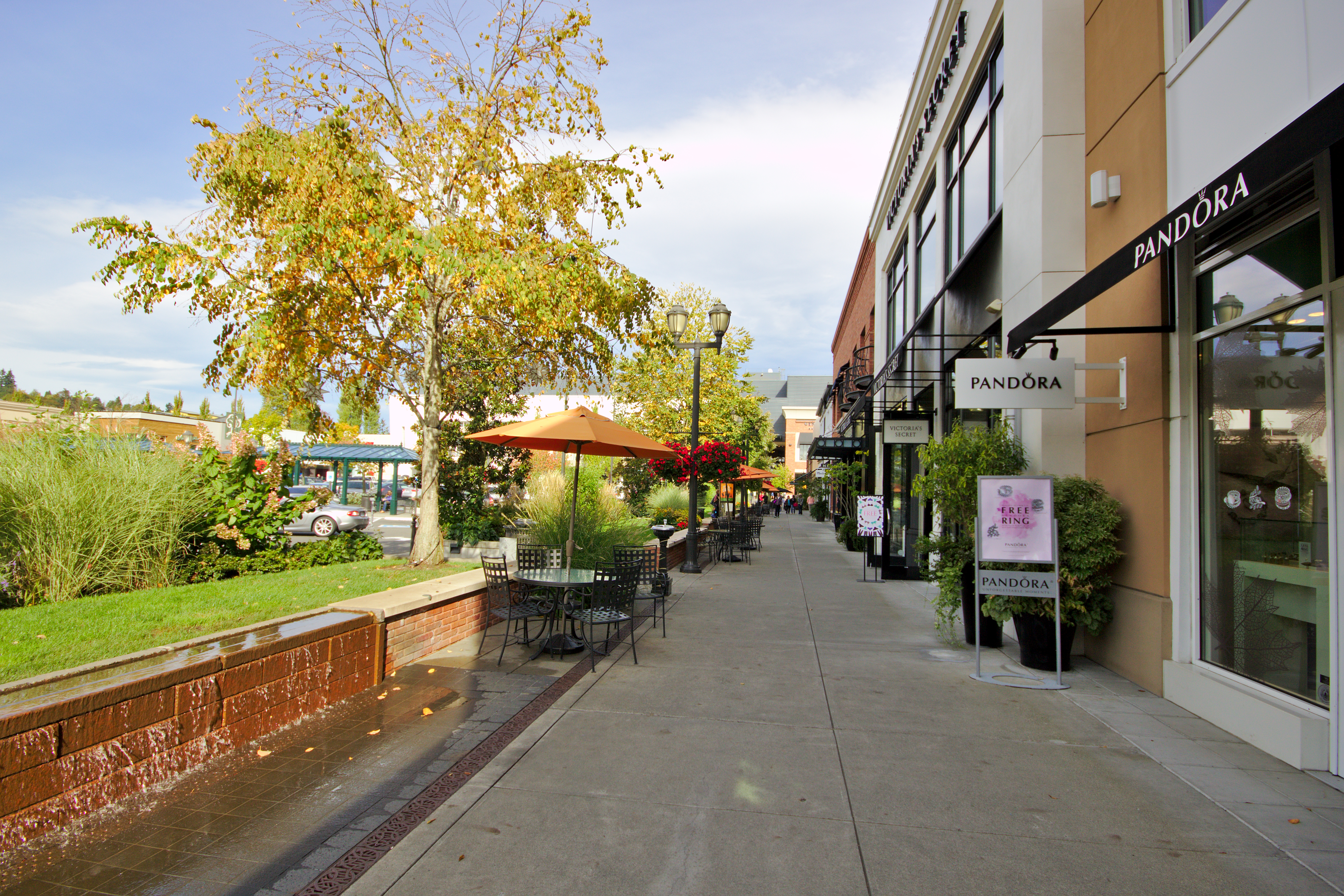
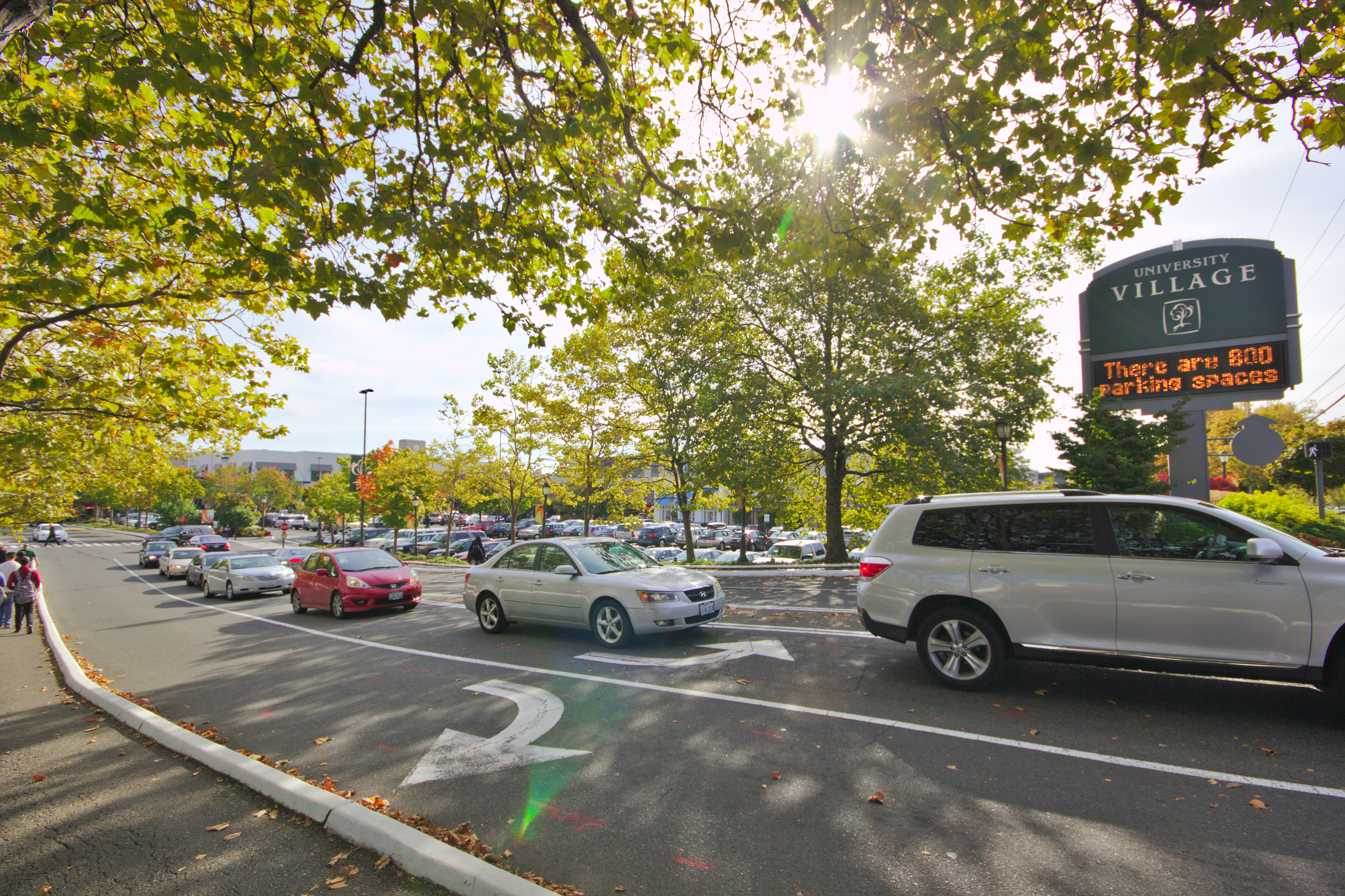
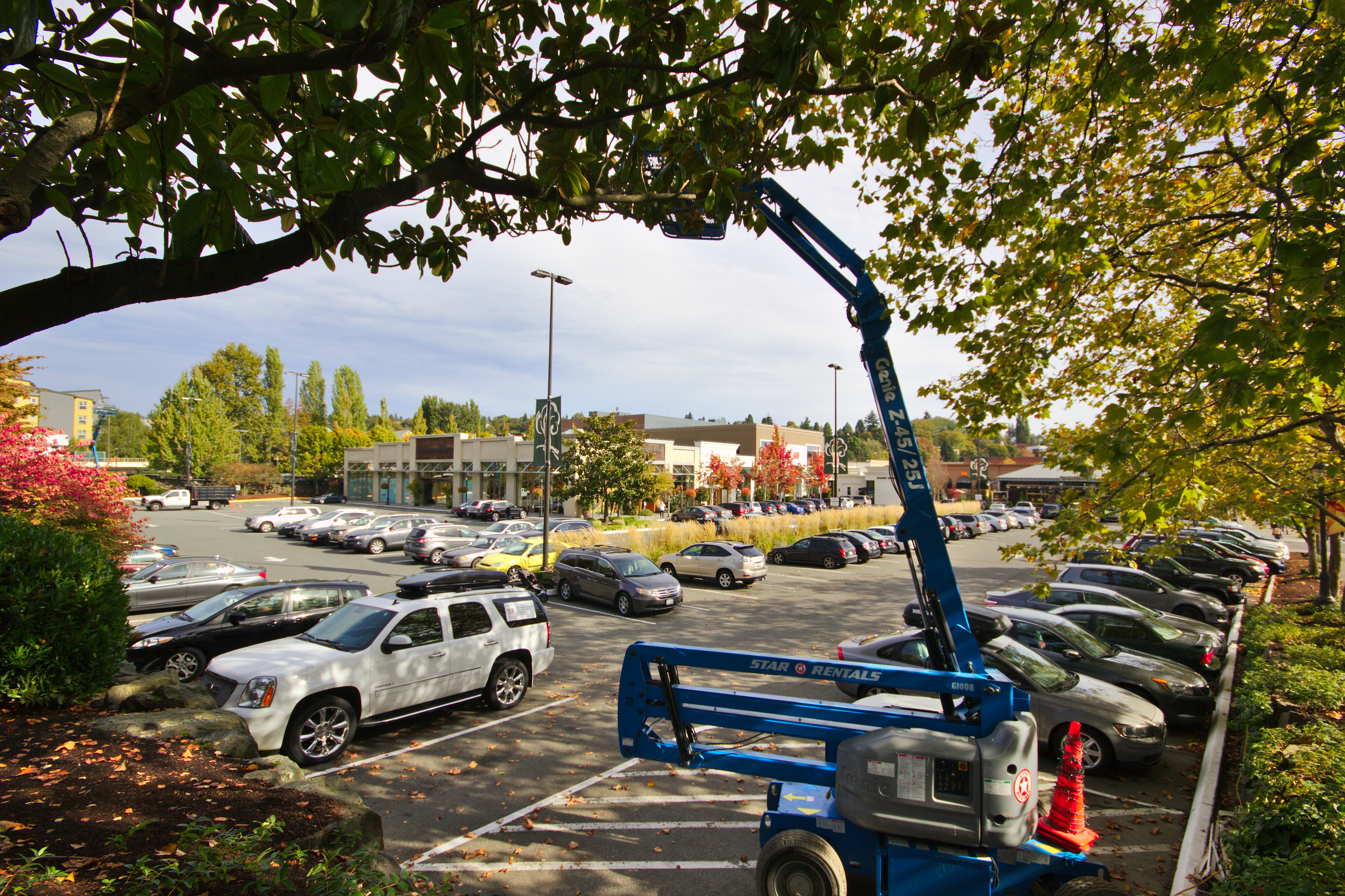
Shops, entrance, and parking lot at University Village

Anchor tenants today are an Apple Store, Crate & Barrel, The Gap, and Pottery Barn. A significant adjacent anchor is the Seattle QFC flagship store. A competing Safeway location behind QFC closed in 2023 and was relocated to University District. In 1991, neighborhood activists initiated a campaign with the City to "daylight" Ravenna Creek through Ravenna Park to Lake Washington, but the segment from the park to the University of Washington (UW) and the Union Bay Natural Area was successfully blocked by the owners of University Village. It has been recently updated to include more shops below the brand new medical center.

Amazon.com, an online retailer founded and based in the region, opened its first physical storefront at University Village on November 3, 2015. It has since closed.

== Boundaries ==
The campus of the UW is to the west and south, the neighborhood of Bryant farther to the east, and the neighborhood of Ravenna to the north, but portions of the surrounding neighborhoods are often referred to as being in "University Village" themselves, approximately west to 22nd Avenue NE, north to NE 55th Street, and east to Union Bay Place NE and 30th Avenue NE.< The area's principal arterials are 25th Avenue NE and NE 45th Street; 35th Avenue is a minor arterial. Collector arterials are NE Blakeley-Union Bay Place NE and NE 55th streets.

== See also ==
- Neighborhoods of Ravenna Creek

== Bibliography ==
- "About Gottschalks". Gottschalks. n.d.
- "About the Seattle City Clerk's On-line Information Services", Information Services, Seattle City Clerk's Office. Retrieved April 21, 2006. See heading, "Note about limitations of these data".
- "Chronology". Ravenna Creek Alliance. n.d. Archived from the original on March 3, 2016.
- Dorpat, Paul (June 18, 2001, updated May 2002). "Seattle Neighborhoods: University District -- Thumbnail History". Retrieved April 21, 2006. HistoryLink page updated from Paul Dorpat, Seattle: Now and Then Vols. 1, 2, and 3. Seattle: Tartu Publications, 1984, 1988;
  Walt Crowley and Paul Dorpat, "The Ave: Streetcars to Street Fairs", typescript dated 1995 in possession of Walt Crowley and Paul Dorpat, Seattle, Washington;
  Walt Crowley, Rites of Passage. Seattle: University of Washington Press, 1995;
  Cal McCune, From Romance to Riot: A Seattle Memoir. Seattle: Cal McCune, 1996;
  Roy Nielsen, UniverCity: The City Within City: The Story of the University District Seattle: University Lions Foundation, ca. 1986;
  Clark Humphrey, Loser: the Real Seattle Music Story. Portland, OR: Feral House, 1995.
- "HISTORY @ UBNA" (Union Bay Natural Area). Center for Urban Horticulture (n.d., 1999 per "Montlake Landfill Information Summary, January 1999" on page). Retrieved April 21, 2006.
- "Map", Home > Information > Map at "Map", U Village. PDF dated May 7, 2006. Retrieved April 21, 2006.
- O'Neil, Kit, University Community Urban Center (n.d., 1997 per Chronology Archived December 20, 2004, at the Wayback Machine). "Ravenna Creek Daylighting Project" Archived August 31, 2005, at the Wayback Machine. Retrieved April 21, 2006.
- Phelps, Myra L. (1978). Public works in Seattle. Seattle: Seattle Engineering Department. ISBN 0-9601928-1-6.
- Ravenna Creek Alliance (November 9, 2005). "Ravenna Creek Alliance: Specific Info" Archived April 7, 2005, at the Wayback Machine. Retrieved April 21, 2006.
- Ravenna Creek Alliance (November 9, 2005). "What's New". Retrieved April 21, 2006.
- Seattle City Clerk's Neighborhood Map Atlas (n.d., map .jpg c. June 17, 2002). "Ravenna". Retrieved April 21, 2006.
  Maps "NN-1030S", "NN-1040S".jpg dated June 17, 2002.
- Stein, Alan J. "Patches, Julius Pierpont", HistoryLink. March 2, 2003, retrieved April 21, 2006. Stein referenced Jack Broom, “The J.P. Generation," Pacific Magazine, The Seattle Times, April 4, 1993, pp. 6–11,14-17;
  Bill Cartmel, “Hi Ya, Patches Pals," Seattle Post-Intelligencer, 11 April 1971, pp. 6–7;
  Erik Lacitis, “Patches Understands – and Survives," The Seattle Times, February 23, 1978, p. A15;
  [no title], The East Side Journal, May 31, 1962, p. 3; Ibid. May 14, 1969, p. 19.
- "Street Classification Maps". Seattle Department of Transportation. 2005. Archived from the original on June 14, 2006.
  High-Resolution Version, PDF format, 16.1 MB
  Medium-Resolution Version, PDF format, 1.45 MB January 12, 2004.
  Low-Resolution Version, PDF format, 825 KB January 12, 2004.
  "Planned Arterials Map Legend Definitions", PDF format. January 12, 2004.
  The high resolution version is good for printing, 11 x 17. The low and medium resolution versions are good for quicker online viewing. [Source: "Street Classification Maps, Note on Accessing These PDF Files"]
- Warren, James R. (updated September 13, 2004). "Bartell, George H. Sr. (1868-1956)". September 16, 1999, corrected on April 17, 2002, and updated on September 13, 2004. Retrieved April 21, 2006. Warren referenced "A Century of Business," Puget Sound Business Journal, September 17, 1999;
  Junior Achievement of Greater Puget Sound Hall of Fame Series;
  "Bartell Drugs: All in the Family," Seattle Post-Intelligencer, February 22, 2000, p. C-1
