= Stroum =

Stroum is a surname. Notable people with the surname include:

- Cynthia Stroum (born 1950), American diplomat and political donor
- Samuel Stroum (1921–2001), American businessman and philanthropist
