= Stuart Sloan =

American businessman

Stuart Sloan is an American business person based in Seattle, Washington. He is the former owner and former chairman of QFC, an American grocery store chain based in Bellevue, Washington. He currently owns a mall in the University District neighborhood of Seattle, University Village.

In 2023, Sloan recruited support from the City of Seattle and Seattle mayor Bruce Harrell by sending photos of nude beachgoers taken without consent to the mayor to collaborate in a plan to discourage nude bathers at Denny Blaine Park. The park is a historical nude beach popular with LGBT+ people, and the LGBT+ community protested against Sloan's attempts to remove them.

== Businesses ==
Sloan was the owner and chairman of QFC before selling it to Kroger.

In 2011 Sloan sold his businesses related to winemaking.

== Philanthropy ==
In 2000, Sloan was organizing a program to develop T.T. Minor Elementary School in Seattle. Some teachers protested his program, fearing that it was dismissive of the needs of the black community. A few years later, Sloan began a similar development program at another school, and the initial results showed that this development did not improve student test scores.

In 2013 he was the spokesperson for a bicycling fundraiser for cancer research.

In 2007 Sloan sponsored a party at Gas Works Park.

In 2022 Sloan and his wife pledged $78 million to Fred Hutchinson Cancer Center. At the time, this was the largest single donation to the organization.

== Denny Blaine Park Controversy ==
In November 2023, Seattle Parks and Recreation presented a plan to redevelop Denny Blane Park, a popular nude beach, into a children's playground. An anonymous donor pledged $550,000 to fund the project. Seattle Parks and Recreation instructed employees to "maintain a policy of confidentiality" regarding the redevelopment project because "If this gets out, it will be very problematic."

After public outcry during a December 2023 community meeting, Seattle Parks and Recreation decided to scrap the playground plan, stating "feedback from the community indicated the park was not the right location for the play area."

In May 2024, KUOW broke the news that Stuart Sloan was the anonymous donor for the redevelopment plan. Sloan lives next to Denny Blaine Park and texted and met with Seattle city leaders, including Mayor Bruce Harrell, to discuss the park and his redevelopment plans. In July 2024, KUOW published many of the private text messages between Sloan, Harrell and other city leaders with photos of nude beach goers. In texts, Sloan stated, "This is disgusting, and as you’ve said, we’re on the right side of this issue...I hope you agree that we need to get ahead of this or it will be more difficult once the good weather returns.” Mayor Harrell agreed, stating, "If you are disgusted, I share your disgust."

In May 2024, the City put forth a policy suggestion, which would create two zones in Deny Blaine Park: "naked Zone A, composed of the grassy area and beach, and a clothed Zone B, consisting of the loop of road... outside the park where several neighbors live." Public nudity remains legal in Seattle as long as the person naked is not trying to cause "affront or alarm."
