= Williams Island (Florida) =

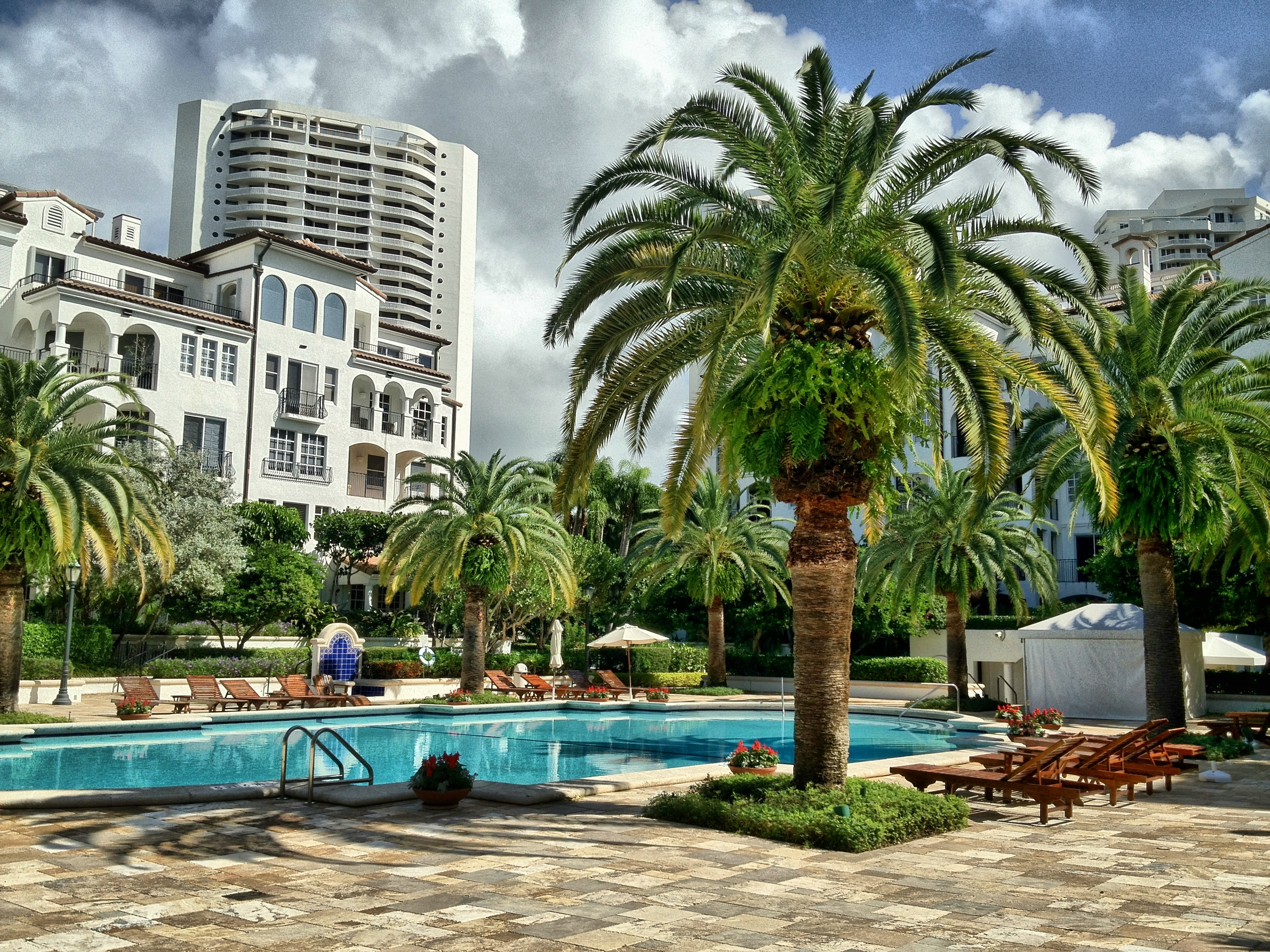
- The Mediterranean Village at Williams Island with 3000 Island Boulevard in the background.

Project
- Opening date: 1985
- Developer: The Trump Group and Mutual Benefit Life Insurance Company
- Architect: Robert M. Swedroe Architects (1000 Island Boulevard, 2000 Island Boulevard, 2800 Island Boulevard, 3000 Island Boulevard, 4000 Island Boulevard, BellaMaré); Bradshaw, Gill, Fuster & Associates (Landscaping and landplanning); Artec (Résidence du Cap, Villa Marina); Cohen, Freedman, Encinosa & Associates (Bellini); John Randal McDonald (Williams Island Spa)
- Operator: Williams Island Property Owners Association, Inc.
- Owner: Williams Island Property Owners Association, Inc.
- Website: williamsislandclub.com

Physical features
- Major buildings: 1000 Island Boulevard, 2000 Island Boulevard, Résidence du Cap, 2800 Island Boulevard, 3000 Island Boulevard, 4000 Island Boulevard, Bellini, BellaMaré, Villa Marina

Location
- Interactive map of Williams Island
- Location within Florida Location within the United States
- Coordinates: 25.944797°N 80.137646°W
- Country: United States
- State: Florida
- City: Aventura
- Address: 7900 Island Boulevard; Aventura, FL, United States

Williams Island is a luxury high-rise condominium complex on 84 acres (34 ha) in Aventura, Florida. The project was constructed by The Trump Group in partnership with the Mutual Benefit Life Insurance Company. Amenities include the Island Grille restaurant, a 27,000 sq ft (2,500 m^{2}) square foot spa, a fitness and wellness center, a Grand Slam-inspired tennis center, a marina, the Island Shop boutique, and the Island Club venue for private functions and entertainment.

== History ==
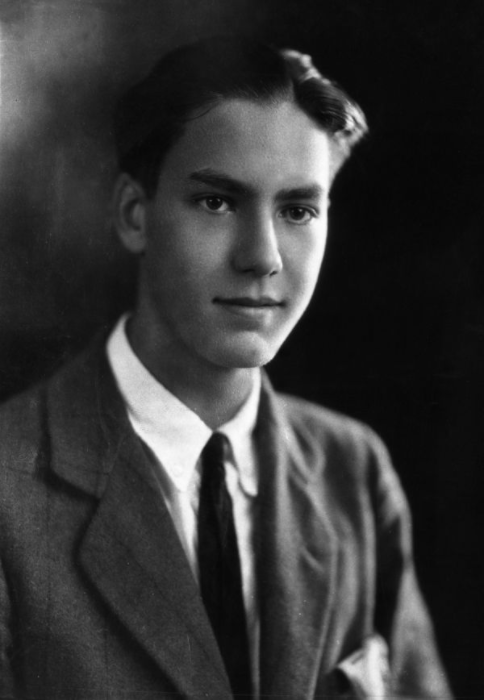
Raymond Gaylord Williams, the eponym of Williams Island, c. 1925

The eponym of the community is Raymond Gaylord Williams, whose family first came to Miami in 1924 from Van Buren, Arkansas. Williams' father came to Miami to start a military academy in Coral Gables, Florida at the request of Coral Gables developer George E. Merrick.

His father-in-law, Evert Price Maule, was the founder of Maule Industries. It was Maule Industries' operations in Ojus that created the peninsula on which Williams Island would later be developed. Starting in 1913, the company excavated and operated a large limestone quarry which filled with water from the area's high water table and created two artificial bodies of water: Maule Lake and Little Lake Maule, which are connected to Dumfoundling Bay by the Ojus Canal. It was these bodies of water that would form the boundaries of present-day Williams Island.

Williams sold the Williams Island tract to Saul J. Morgan and Norman Cohen for $1,815,000 in 1969. Morgan sold his stake in the tract to Cohen in 1971 and in 1980, Cohen sold the property to Julius and Edmond M. Trump for $17,616,500. In partnership with the Mutual Benefit Life Insurance Company, the Trumps began development on Williams Island and the first condominium tower, 4000 Island Boulevard, was completed in 1985. In addition to the initial tower at 4000 Island Boulevard, the Trump Group developed an additional six towers at 1000, 2000, 2600 (Résidence du Cap), 2800, 3000, and 7000 (Villa Marina) Island Boulevard in addition to the low-rise Mediterranean Village at 3700 Island Boulevard. Advertisements for Williams Island featured Italian actress Sophia Loren, who was hired by the Trump Group as a creative consultant and spokeswoman. In addition to serving as a consultant, Loren and her family also maintained a seasonal home on the island.

The Trumps sold an additional tower site at 6000 Island Boulevard for development to Naples-based WCI Communities (WCI) in 2001. WCI completed construction on the 6000 Island Boulevard tower, BellaMaré, in August 2005. An additional site at 1500 Island Boulevard was developed into Villa Flora by Vintage Properties and Williams Island Development in 2005. Bellini, the final tower on Williams Island at 4100 Island Boulevard was completed by Martin Margulies in 2013. The Trump Group maintained an active interest in Williams Island until selling and turning over management of the island's common facilities to the Williams Island Property Owner's Association in 2004 for $17 million. The sale was financed by a 20-year $90 assessment to be paid by all property owners.

== In popular media ==
The complex was featured in a 1986 episode of the American television series Lifestyles of the Rich and Famous. The episode featured Williams Island resident, celebrity spokeswoman, and creative consultant Sophia Loren. In the episode, series host Robin Leach referred to Williams Island as an "exclusive billion-dollar condominium community," and further stated "don't be surprised to see $200,000 Italian sports cars. It's all part of this money-no-object, Europe-in-America feel that Sophia helped give just the right accent to."

Loren and her Ted Fine-decorated Williams Island apartment were featured in the March 1987 issue of Architectural Digest. Describing the complex in the article, Loren stated "from the very beginning we used Portofino—one of the loveliest resorts on the Mediterranean—as the model while the plan for Williams Island was taking shape."

Along with the ultra-luxury cruise ship Royal Viking Sun, the complex was featured as a filming location in the 1988 television special, Bob Hope's Jolly Christmas Show. In the broadcast, Hope and co-host Dolly Parton sang a rendition of Silver Bells while strolling through a faux snowstorm on Williams Island. In reality, the temperature the day of filming had been as high as 80 degrees and the snow consisted of shredded styrofoam and cotton dropped from a box suspended among palm trees. Also featured was a conversation between Bob Hope and Miami Vice star Don Johnson in the Williams Island Marina in which Johnson showcases his 43-foot Wellcraft Scarab Excel "Don Johnson Signature Series" powered by twin Lamborghini V-12 engines.

Williams Island was a filming location for the 1992 comedy-drama film Folks!, starring Tom Selleck and Don Ameche. In the film, the island was portrayed as the home of the irresponsible and gold-digging Arlene Aldrich (Christine Ebersole), sister of main character Jon Aldrich (Selleck). Filming was done on-site at 2800 Island Boulevard.

Footage of the island was featured in the 2012 documentary film Évocateur: The Morton Downey Jr. Movie. Downey, a Williams Island resident, is shown showcasing the artwork and furnishings in his new Ted Fine-decorated apartment he shared with his wife Lori Krebs. According to Robert Perlberg of Ted Fine Decorators, Downey chose a color palette of "tone on tone, ivory and taupe, with hints of black" when decorating his apartment. Also included in the film was exterior footage of the Mediterranean Village and the Williams Island Marina.

== Towers ==
Name	Height	Floors	Architect	Year
1000 Island Boulevard	≈348 ft	31	Robert M. Swedroe Architects	1990
2000 Island Boulevard	≈348 ft	31	Robert M. Swedroe Architects	1995
Résidence du Cap	≈348 ft	31	Artec	1997
2800 Island Boulevard	≈337 ft	30	Robert M. Swedroe Architects	1990
3000 Island Boulevard	≈337 ft	30	Robert M. Swedroe Architects	1989
4000 Island Boulevard	≈337 ft	30	Robert M. Swedroe Architects	1985
Bellini	≈370 ft	24	Cohen, Freedman, Encinosa & Associates	2013
BellaMaré	≈337 ft	30	Robert M. Swedroe Architects	2005
Villa Marina	≈371 ft	33	Artec	1998

== Notable residents ==
- Bobbi Kristina Brown, American reality television personality, singer and actress, daughter of singers Whitney Houston and Bobby Brown
- Bobby Brown, American singer, songwriter, dancer, and actor, husband of Whitney Houston
- Jim Courier, American tennis player
- Billy Cunningham, American basketball player and coach
- Morton Downey Jr., American singer, songwriter and television talk show host of The Morton Downey Jr. Show
- Whitney Houston, American singer and actress
- Jimmy Johnson, Dallas Cowboys 2-time Super Bowl Champion; Cowboys and later Miami Dolphins Coach
- Sophia Loren, Italian actress, creative consultant and spokeswoman for Williams Island
- Carlo Ponti, Italian film producer, husband of Sophia Loren
- Carlo Ponti Jr., Italian orchestral conductor, son of Carlo Ponti and Sophia Loren
- Edoardo Ponti, Italian director, son of Carlo Ponti and Sophia Loren
- Fred Stolle, Australian tennis player, 2 time major winner
- Frankie Valli, American pop singer
