= Folks! =

1992 film by Ted Kotcheff

- Theatrical release poster
- Directed by: Ted Kotcheff
- Written by: Robert Klane
- Produced by: Victor Drai; Malcolm R. Harding
- Starring: Tom Selleck; Don Ameche; Anne Jackson; Wendy Crewson; Christine Ebersole; Michael Murphy
- Cinematography: Larry Pizer
- Edited by: Joan E. Chapman
- Music by: Michel Colombier
- Production company: Penta Pictures
- Distributed by: 20th Century Fox
- Release date: May 1, 1992
- Running time: 109 minutes
- Country: United States
- Language: English
- Budget: $15 million
- Box office: $6.1 million

Folks! is a 1992 American black comedy film directed by Ted Kotcheff, written by Robert Klane and starring Tom Selleck as a selfish yuppie who takes in his parents after their house burns down. It was panned by critics, earning Selleck a nomination for the Golden Raspberry Award for Worst Actor and also underperformed at the box office.

== Plot ==
Successful stockbroker Jon Aldrich is living a good life with his wife Audrey and their two kids Kevin & Maggie until he encounters his elderly father, Harry, who has dementia and has accidentally burned down his own house. He tries to get his sister Arlene (who has two sons Jerry & Steve but is an irresponsible gold digger) to take care of Harry and his wife Mildred but she won't even open the door. Consequently, Harry and Mildred have to move in with him and his family, causing his life to start going downhill.

The company Jon works for was apparently doing illegal things which he knew nothing of, but no one believes him therefore he loses his job. The problems for him continue to mount as Harry continues to cause much trouble and, because of that, his family becomes broke. Audrey moves out with the kids and they lose everything except their apartment. Furthermore, as a result of his severe senility, Harry continues to unintentionally injure Jon, causing him to get hearing loss, a broken hand and a broken foot when a car runs over it. He also loses a testicle. Plus, Harry endangers the lives of Kevin, Maggie and himself at one point by jaywalking in an intersection one morning while trying to take them for a walk without letting anyone know.

Because of the whole mess, Jon slowly starts to lose his own sanity but in a brief moment of regaining his own, Harry tells him that he never wanted to burden him but he soon slips back into his state of dementia, where he is just consistently happy and often yells out "McDonald's". Jon talks with Mildred who also says that she and Harry never wanted to burden him. She then tells him that they have discussed it and they want him to help them die so he can collect the insurance money. He initially opposes this but eventually changes his tune.

Somehow ending up agreeing to volunteer to it, Jon helps Harry and Mildred try to commit suicide many unsuccessful times and halfway through the attempts Arlene shows up on his doorstep with both of her corpulent sons, needing a place to live. He initially refuses because she would not even open the door for Harry and Mildred but he eventually caves in and lets them stay. She also joins in on the attempts to help Harry and Mildred die, hoping for a cut of the insurance money. Her attempts are also unsuccessful.

Things slowly start looking up for Jon as Audrey eventually shows up to tell him that she was wrong for leaving and how much she loves the fact that he was willing to take in both Harry and Mildred. Upon her arrival she realizes all the injuries he has suffered since she saw last him, including the lost testicle. As they are reconciling, he realizes that Arlene, Harry and Mildred are gone and he knows they are going to try to commit suicide again with her help, so he tracks them down in an attempt to stop them which he successfully does but not without facing a bit more injury.

Jon eventually gets their lives on track. He and Audrey buy a house in the country and Harry and Mildred move in with them. Arlene is now with FBI agent Ed, a man who knows how to handle her misbehaving sons. Finally, it is revealed that Harry hasn't been yelling "McDonald's" because he was hungry, but because he bought stock in McDonnell Douglas many years ago, meaning he is worth tons of money.

== Cast ==
- Tom Selleck as Jon Aldrich
- Don Ameche as Harry Aldrich, Jon’s father
- Anne Jackson as Mildred Aldrich, Jon’s mother
- Christine Ebersole as Arlene Aldrich, Jon’s younger sister
- Wendy Crewson as Audrey Aldrich, Jon’s wife
- Robert Pastorelli as Fred, a doorman
- Michael Murphy as Ed, an FBI agent
- Kevin Timothy Chevalia as Kevin Aldrich, Jon & Audrey's son
- Margaret Murphy as Maggie Aldrich, Jon & Audrey's daughter
- Joseph Miller as Jerry Aldrich, Arlene's first son and Jon’s nephew
- T.J. Parish as Steve Aldrich, Arlene's second son and Jon’s nephew
- Jon Favreau as Chicago Taxi Driver

== Production ==
Filming was done at Williams Island. Before Selleck was cast, Tim Robbins was offered one-million-dollars to star in the film, opposite Alan Arkin, but turned it down on the off-chance that Robert Altman's film The Player would receive a greenlight.

== Reception ==
On the review aggregator website Rotten Tomatoes, 0% of 19 critics' reviews are positive, with an average rating of 2.5/10. The website's consensus reads: "Don't watch this alleged comedy looking for more than pained performances in support of ill-advised ageist jokes, because that's all Folks! has to offer." Audiences surveyed by CinemaScore gave the film a grade of "C+" on scale of A+ to F.

Noted the Los Angeles Times, "If gays and lesbians think they're getting a bad rap in the movies, consider the filmic lot of the elderly. First Stop! Or My Mom Will Shoot, now Folks! Where are the Gray Panthers when you need them?"

The New York Times noted that its screenwriter Robert Klane "is best known as the screenwriter of Where's Poppa? and he may be aspiring to comparably dark humor. But Folks! tries to be tender and vicious simultaneously, and that makes for an impossible mix. A more mean-spiritedly funny actor might have carried this material better, but Mr. Selleck strives for the cuddly rather than the caustic. Mr. Ameche, mugging furiously, affects a jaw-jutting blank look and even props his chin on Mr. Selleck's shoulder occasionally for quasi-comic effect."

Folks! came out a month after the Washington Square Park Massacre on April 23, 1992, where an elderly woman lost control of her vehicle and killed four pedestrians, which Gene Siskel said on the "Worst Movies of 1992" special of At the Movies was in "bad taste.

The film was not a box office success.
