= Totem Lake =

- Lake Wittenmyer, Lake Watstine, Mudd Lake (historical)
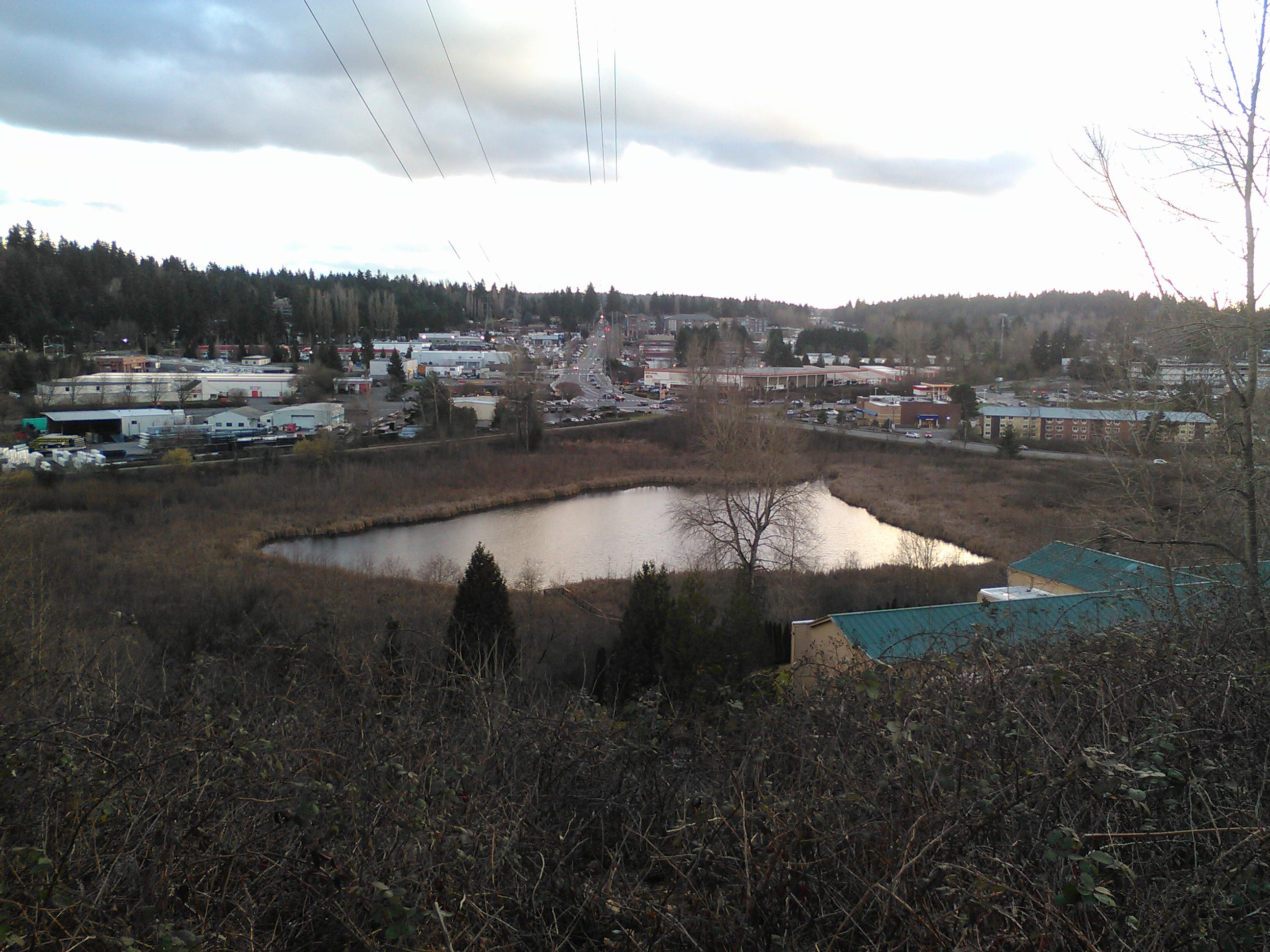
- Totem lake as seen from a hill to its north

- Location in the United States Location in Washington
- Location: Kirkland, Washington, U.S.
- Coordinates: 47°42′39″N 122°10′34″W
- Type: Kettle lake
- Primary outflows: Juanita Creek
- Surface area: 2 acres (0.81 ha)
- Surface elevation: 131 feet (40 m)
- References: coordinates and elevation from U.S. Geological Survey

Totem Lake is a two-acre (0.8 ha) lake in the northwest United States, located in Kirkland, Washington, a suburb east of Seattle, at the head of a branch of Juanita Creek, inside the Juanita Creek Basin. A Kirkland neighborhood and retail/residential development are named for the lake.

A 17.2-acre (7.0 ha) park completely surrounds the lake, bordered by the Cross Kirkland Corridor linear park and trail. The lake has had other names including Lake Wittenmyer, Lake Watstine, Mudd Lake, and an original Native American name which has been lost.
