= Bi-Mart =

American retail store chain

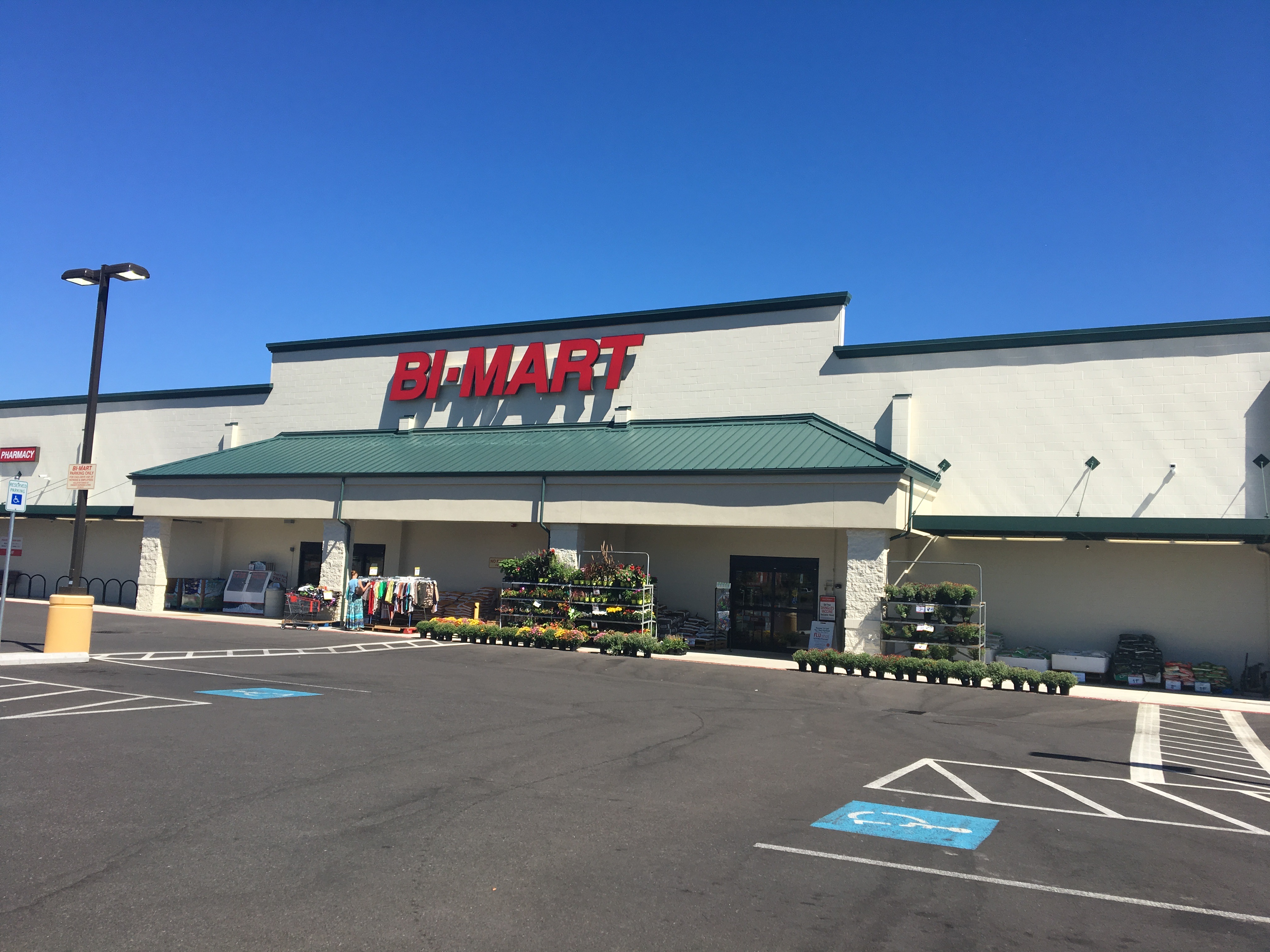
- Bi-Mart in Scappoose, Oregon
- Type: Private
- Industry: Retail
- Founded: 1955; 71 years ago, Yakima, Washington, U.S.
- Headquarters: Eugene, Oregon
- Number of locations: 80 Bi-Mart locations, 5 Cascade Farm and Outdoor locations
- Key people: Marty Smith (CEO); Todd Watson (president & co-CEO); Chris Peddicord (vice president); Don Leber (Director of Advertising)
- Products: Clothing, footwear, housewares, sporting goods, automotive, hardware, toys, electronics, foods, beer, seasonal goods
- Revenue: ▲US$878 million (2021)
- Number of employees: ▲3,200 (2021)
- Website: www.bimart.com

Bi-Mart is an employee-owned, members-only chain of retailers located in the western U.S. states of Oregon, Washington, and Idaho. A lifetime membership costs $5 and never expires.

A typical Bi-Mart houses merchandise including electronics and small appliances, housewares, hardware and power tools, sporting goods, automotive, apparel, canned and packaged food, and personal care products. The median size of a Bi-Mart store is 31,000 square feet (2,900 m^{2}).

== History ==
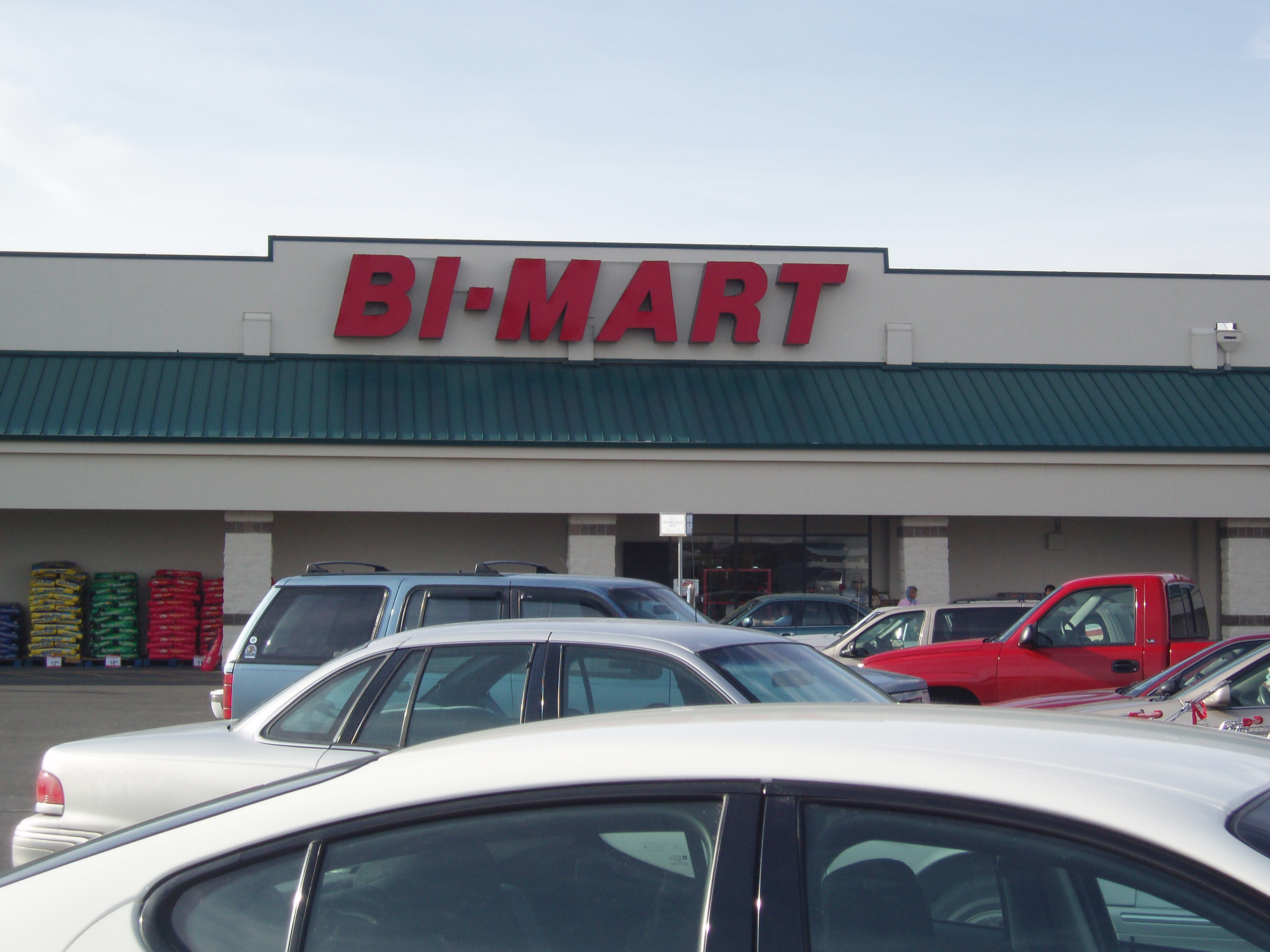
A typical Bi-Mart store in Ontario, Oregon

BI-Mart was founded in 1955 and is headquartered in Eugene, Oregon. The first store opened out of a garage in Yakima, Washington. At the time, membership cost $2. In 1962, the company opened its first standalone store in Eugene. A second store in Eugene was opened in 1967. By 1970, the chain had eight stores. Bi-Mart was bought by Pay 'n Save in 1975.

In 1988, Pay 'n Save—along with Bi-Mart—was acquired by Thrifty Corporation. There were 37 BI-Mart locations at the time. It was subsequently merged into Thrifty PayLess when Thrifty acquired PayLess Drug from Kmart in 1993. in 1996, Rite Aid acquired Thrifty PayLess for $1.3 billion but did not intend to keep the 44-store BI-Mart chain.

In 1997, Bi-Mart's management and Endeavour Capital, a Portland-based venture capital firm, bought the company from Rite Aid. They sold the business to employees through an Employee Stock Ownership Plan on March 1, 2004 for $94 million, which included $12.5 million contributed from the 401(k) plan. The chain consisted of 64 stores in Oregon, Washington, and Montana at the time.

In October 2003, Bi-Mart announced it was expanding eastward. Eight stores were planned with the first store in Havre, Montana (though this location soon closed). The company expanded into Idaho in 2006, opening a store in Weiser. Another location opened in Emmett in 2009. Bi-Mart opened its 75th store in May 2014. Additional Idaho stores were opened in Kuna, Caldwell, Star, and Rathdrum between 2017 and 2020.

=== Pharmacy closures ===
In 2019, Bi-Mart announced the closure of pharmacies at its East Wenatchee, Washington, Vancouver, Washington, and Scappoose, Oregon locations. Bi-Mart announced in November 2019 that it would also close pharmacies at an additional 13 stores in the Portland area. The retail stores affected by the pharmacy closures were to remain open.

On September 30, 2021, Bi-Mart announced that it would close most of its remaining in-store pharmacies at 56 locations. Prescription files would be transferred to nearby Walgreens locations. In select areas where there was no Walgreens nearby, Walgreens would take over and operate the existing pharmacy departments inside those Bi-Mart locations. The locations that retained a pharmacy and operate under Walgreens ownership are Monmouth, Eugene (18th Ave), Stayton, Klamath Falls, (53rd St), La Pine, Prineville, and Weiser, ID.

== Cascade Farm and Outdoor ==
In 2014, Bi-Mart opened its first location under the Cascade Farm and Outdoor name in Walla Walla, Washington. Bi-Mart announced that they were looking at empty buildings in a variety of locations for future stores. Additional locations have since opened in Coos Bay, Oregon, Keizer, Oregon, Hood River, Oregon, and Springfield, Oregon. Unlike Bi-Mart's regular stores, a membership is not required to shop at Cascade Farm and Outdoor.

On January 27, 2026, Bi-Mart announced the closure of all five Cascade Farm and Outdoor stores by Spring of 2026. This is so that Bi-Mart can focus on expansion efforts of their namesake stores in the Pacific Northwest. The Hood River location will be converted to a regular Bi-Mart store.
