= QFC =

American supermarket chain

Quality Food Centers, Inc.
- Trade name: QFC
- Formerly: Lake Hills Thriftway (1955–1963)
- Type: Subsidiary
- Industry: Grocery retail
- Founded: November 26, 1955 in Seattle, Washington, U.S.
- Founder: Jack Croco
- Headquarters: Bellevue, Washington, U.S.
- Number of locations: 59 (2025)
- Area served: Washington and Oregon
- Key people: Christopher A. Sinclair (chairman & CEO)
- Products: Bakery, dairy, deli, frozen foods, gasoline, general grocery, meat, pharmacy, produce, seafood, snacks
- Revenue: ▲$1 billion (2021)
- Number of employees: 5,900 (2021)
- Parent: Kroger
- Website: www.qfc.com

Quality Food Centers, Inc., better known as QFC, is an American supermarket chain based in Bellevue, Washington, east of Seattle. It is a subsidiary of Kroger and has 59 stores in western Washington and northwestern Oregon, primarily located in the Puget Sound region and Portland–Vancouver metropolitan area.

== History ==
Jack Croco began his career in the grocery business in the 1940s in Boise, Idaho, working for Albertsons. By 1950, he had become the district manager in the Northwest and was responsible for opening the first Albertson's stores in the Seattle area. Soon afterward in 1955, Croco opened his grocery store in Bellevue, called Lake Hills Thriftway.

The grocery chain that would come to be named QFC in 1963 was founded in 1955 with the first store at 6600 Roosevelt Way N.E. in Seattle by a group headed by Vern Fortin, the former president of Van de Kamp's Holland Dutch Bakeries and founder of Vernell's Fine Candies. Croco merged his store with QFC in 1960 and remained involved in the company until he died in 1991 at the age of 65, though in 1986 he sold QFC to Seattle investment firm Sloan, Adkins & Co., which took QFC public in 1987.

Christopher A. Sinclair became the CEO in 1996; the following year, QFC purchased the Uddenberg grocery company, which operated Thriftway and Stock Market stores throughout western Washington. In late 1997, QFC was sold to Portland-based Fred Meyer, and several months later in May 1998, Kroger announced its intention to acquire Fred Meyer (and QFC), which was approved a year later. The Roosevelt store operated until 2012; it closed on May 5 to make way for the construction of the Roosevelt light rail station.

A Fred Meyer store at the Broadway Market on Seattle's Capitol Hill was replaced by a QFC in 2004.

== Expansion ==
QFC's flagship store located in Kirkland, Washington

Over the years, QFC has expanded aggressively through acquisitions. When A&P abandoned the Seattle area in 1974, QFC took over several locations. They expanded to surrounding counties in the 1990s by acquiring and renaming Olson's Food Stores, Johnny's Food Centers, Stock Market Grocery Stores, and several Thriftway stores. Between 1990 and 1996, thirty stores were acquired from eleven independent grocery chains. Among them was Olson's Foods, a Lynnwood-based chain with twelve existing stores and four new stores in development. Reed's Super Valu in Port Hadlock and Stock Market Foods in Port Townsend were acquired in 1997, and the company also expanded into Oregon in the Portland metropolitan area.

During the tenure of CEO Stuart Sloan in the 1980s, the company branded itself as an upmarket chain and began offering more premium items. It had an initial public offering in 1987. In the mid-1990s, QFC expanded to Southern California by acquiring Hughes Family Markets (which kept its name). By the mid-1990s, many Hughes store locations were sold to Ralphs, which was soon sold to Fred Meyer, later acquired by Kroger. A new flagship store opened in downtown Kirkland in 2019, with 50,000 square feet (4,600 m^{2}) of space. A rebrand to "the Q" was proposed in 2018 but later rejected.

Kroger proposed an acquisition of rival grocer Albertsons in 2022 that would have required the combined company to spin off locations to preserve brand competition. Among the proposed aspects of the merger was a divestment of all but five of QFC's 59 locations. The acquisition was rejected by the Federal Trade Commission in 2024, leaving QFC part of the Kroger Company.

== Philanthropy and labor relations ==
In 1996, Stuart Sloan, former owner and chairman of QFC, promised to spend at least $1 million a year for the next eight years to overhaul one of Seattle Public Schools's most challenged schools, T.T. Minor Elementary. The funds were donated in addition to public dollars and helped to pay for uniforms, smaller class sizes and a year-round schedule, though how the funds were applied sparked controversy.

Fred Meyer and QFC workers are primarily represented by UFCW Local 3000. After the union distributed Black Lives Matter buttons in 2020, Kroger managers prohibited their use by employees. The action was found to violate federal labor law by a National Labor Relations Board judge in May 2023.
