= Lamonts =

American department store chain

Lamonts Apparel, Inc.
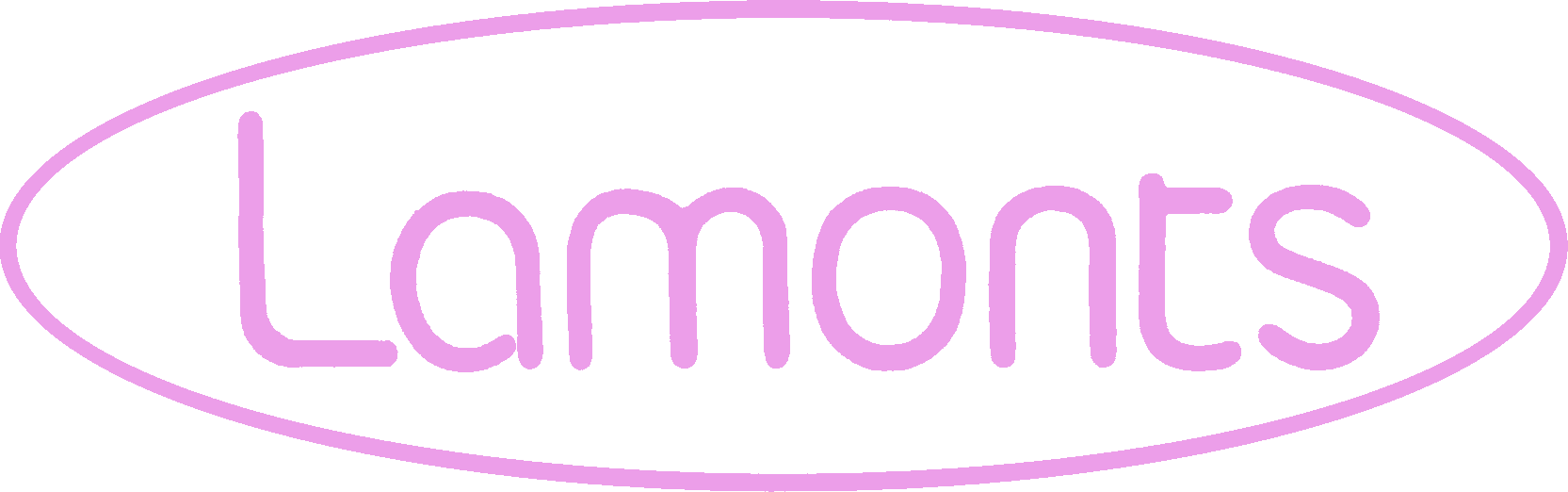
- Company type: Public
- Industry: Retail
- Founded: Seattle, Washington, United States (1970)
- Founder: M. Lamont Bean
- Defunct: 2000
- Fate: Acquired by Gottschalks
- Headquarters: Kirkland, Washington, United States
- Area served: Alaska, Idaho, Oregon, Washington (2000)
- Products: Clothing, footwear, furniture, jewelry, and housewares
- Parent: Pay 'n Save (1965-1985)
- Subsidiaries: Lamonts for Kids

Lamonts was a chain of department stores founded in Seattle, Washington. The chain was started in 1970 when Pay 'n Save renamed its suburban branches of Rhodes, a department store chain the company acquired in 1965. Lamonts remained a division of Pay 'n Save until 1985. During the 1990s, the chain filed for bankruptcy twice and closed several stores before being sold to Gottschalks in 2000. Gottschalks itself went into bankruptcy and liquidated in 2009.

== History ==
=== Rhodes Department Stores ===
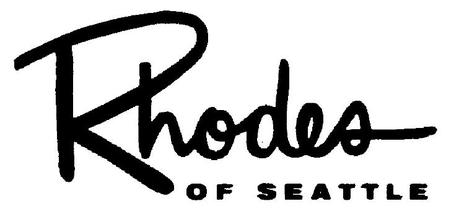
Rhodes logo used through 1969

Rhodes Department store was founded in Seattle by Albert J. Rhodes in 1907 in the Arcade Building on Second Avenue. He was a former partner in the Rhodes Brothers Department Store in Tacoma but the two companies were never affiliated. He was inspired to install a pipe organ in his store after a trip to Wanamaker's famous Department Store in Philadelphia. Albert Rhodes died in 1921, before he had the chance to expand the store but his wife, Harriet W. Rhodes, continued operations. By 1927, the store had outgrown its quarters. Architects Harlan Thomas and Clyde Gral were commissioned to design a new seven story store that would take up half of a block. It included the Aeolian Pipe organ that Albert had planned. With the prosperity following World War II, the company expanded by opening branch stores in the University District of Seattle at University Village (1956), Crossroads Mall in Bellevue (July 1964), and in Lake Forest Center Mall in Lake Forest Park (October, 1964).

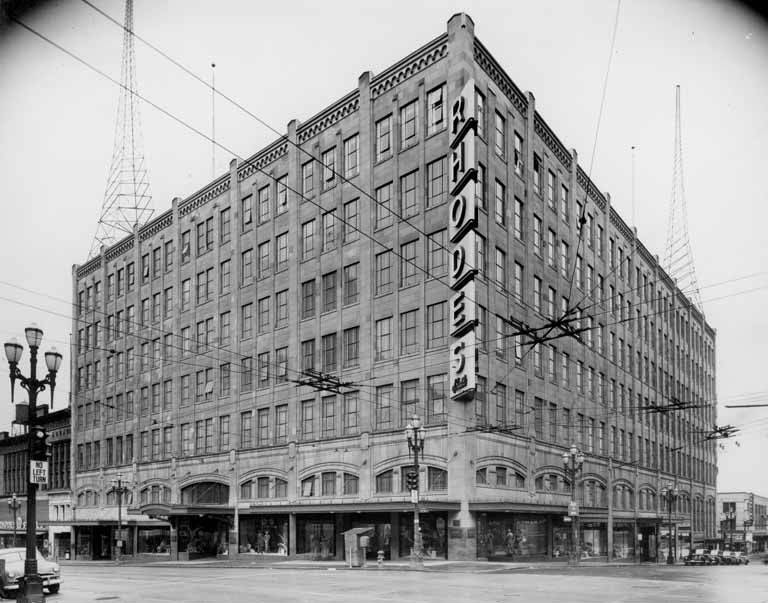
Rhodes' flagship Seattle store, 1928-1968

In October 1967, the financially ailing Rhodes was acquired by The Pay 'n Save Corporation followed in 1968 by the singular Bell's of Burien Department Store, founded in 1956 in Burien, Washington. Pay 'n Save proceeded to shutter Rhodes' flagship store in downtown Seattle in July 1968 as it shifted its focus to the suburbs. The three suburban Rhodes locations as well as the Bell's of Burien store continued to operate as they were for several years. In a move to create a strong department store brand to add to Pay 'n Save's roster of brands, the stores were all converted to the Lamonts name in 1970. The new chain was named for and by M. Lamont Bean, the head of Pay 'n Save Corp. at the time. The Bell's moniker (hyphenated with Lamonts) remained attached to the Burien store until 1974.

=== Expansion and troubles ===
After steady expansion through the 1970s and 1980s, Lamonts finally came into its own when Pay 'n Save Corp. was taken over by New York investors led by brothers Eddie and Julius Trump. With $250 million in junk bonds, they split Lamonts and other Pay 'n Save stores from the company and brought them under the ownership of Northern Pacific Corp. With the hiring of Leonard Snyder, formerly of Allied Stores Corp., as chairman in 1987, a huge growth plan was proposed for the following years. Searching for more capital to expand, Lamonts was sold to Dallas, Texas based Aris Corp., owned by the Thompson family of 7-Eleven fame in 1989. Company profits took a downturn not long after this, though record sales were reported. Profits continued to slide in 1991 and 1992. In November 1992, after a financial restructuring in which the company traded most of its common stock to lenders for a reduced debt, Lamonts proposed an ambitious plan to open three to four 25,000-to 30,000-square-foot (2,800 m^{2}) stores a year in existing malls in Eastern Washington, Idaho, Montana, Utah, Colorado, Nebraska, Kansas, North Dakota and South Dakota. Unfortunately, this plan coincided with the recession of the early 1990s which would put the company in massive debt, eventually leading to its demise.

=== Downfall ===
In the 1990s other more successful chains in areas with Lamonts stores, such as Mervyn's and JCPenney, caused Lamonts to restructure in 1992, to file for Chapter 11 bankruptcy in 1995, and once more in 2000. An ill-timed expansion in the early 1990s put the company so far in debt that it never quite recovered. The first bankruptcy caused the chain to slim down from 57 to 43 stores and to move their headquarters from Bellevue to Kirkland to save costs. Company officials blamed a bad inventory mix and poor sales due to unusually cold spring and summer seasons that finally pushed them over the edge. After emerging from bankruptcy in early 1998, in attempt to modernize and improve their image, they rolled out a brand new store design that was brighter and more shopper-friendly.

In 1999, Lamonts turned down a merger offer from rival chain Troutman's Emporium. During Lamonts third bankruptcy in 2000, Troutman's offered a bid on the company but was outbid by Gottschalks. The company proposed to change some stores to Troutman's Emporium and sell others to The Bon Marché, an upscale department store chain based in Seattle. Lamonts would eventually be acquired by Gottschalks out of bankruptcy court. Gottschalks bought 34 of the 38 remaining Lamonts stores and they were converted into Gottschalks stores by the end of the year. Unfortunately, expectations of the locations' profitability fell short, and on March 31, 2009, Gottschalks announced they were closing and liquidating the remaining 58 locations. The original downtown Rhodes store was demolished in 2003 for the Seattle Art Museum and new Washington Mutual Tower.

== Concept stores ==
In 1991, Lamonts launched Lamonts For Kids which focused on children's clothing, one of Lamonts most profitable departments (accounting for 17 percent of its sales). The first store opened in Boise, Idaho. Other stores were opened in Salt Lake City and Omaha, and in the Mall of America in Minnesota. The stores, usually opened within malls, featured bright colors and graphics, play areas and specially designed fixtures targeted to children. Wide aisles, extra large dressing rooms to accommodate double strollers, and in-store restrooms with changing tables for infants were also included. The focal area in the store's center, dubbed "Lamonster Land", included video monitors with cartoons and other entertainment for kids, as well as books and stuffed animals. Lamonts shut down the chain in December 1994 because of poor operation. At its peak, Lamonts For Kids operated 8 stores.

Lamonsters was a line of infant, toddler and children's clothing introduced in 1986. It was discontinued in 1995.
