= Pic 'N' Save =

Former American retailer

Pic 'N' Save Corporation
- Industry: Retail
- Founded: 1950
- Defunct: 2002, revived as a bargains store in November 2020
- Fate: Acquired by Big Lots
- Headquarters: Culver City, California, United States
- Key people: William Zimmerman
- Products: Closeout products
- Website: https://pnsbargains.com/

Pic 'N' Save Corporation (later MacFrugals) was at one time the second-largest closeout retail chain in the United States. Financial troubles caused the chain to close many stores in the late 1990s and early 2000s.

== History ==
William Zimmerman founded Pic 'N' Save Corporation in 1950 in Culver City, California. By 1985, it operated 90 stores in California and six other U.S. states. In 1991, the company changed its name to MacFrugals. It later expanded to the Southwest and the South, but left both markets in the late 1990s. In 1997, Consolidated Stores Corporation bought out the remaining MacFrugals stores for $995 million (~$1.85 billion in 2025) in stock. In 2002, Big Lots (formerly Consolidated Stores) converted them into the Big Lots brand. This company has no connection to the "Pic-N-Save" chain based in northeast Florida in the 1950s - 1990s.

In 2020, Pic ‘N’ Save was revived as a bargain store. As of 2023, it had two locations in United States: in Anaheim, California, and Whittier, California. In 2024, the Anaheim location closed, leaving the Whittier location the sole remaining location.

== In popular culture ==
In the 1983 film 10 to Midnight, detectives Leo Kessler (Charles Bronson) and McCann (Andrew Stevens) are en route to inform the parents of a murder victim of their daughter's demise when they pass a Pic 'N' Save, next to a Thrifty Drug Store; this location was at 11341 National Boulevard in Los Angeles.

In Troop Beverly Hills (1989) when Freddy discovers soon-to-be ex-wife Phyllis has just gone on a shopping spree using their joint credit cards, he tells her to have her fun now cause after the divorce she'll, "be shopping at the Pic 'N' Save."

Pic 'N' Save's parking lot, store front, and signs were also featured in the 1998 film, Slums of Beverly Hills.
