= Samuel Stroum =

Jewish-American businessman and philanthropist

Samuel N. Stroum (April 14, 1921 – March 9, 2001) was a Jewish-American businessman and philanthropist. He was called the "godfather of Seattle giving".

Stroum was born in Waltham, Massachusetts, the son of Russian Jewish immigrants. He served in the Army Air Corps in World War II and married Althea (1922–2011) in 1942. Stroum founded ALMAC-Stroum Electronics in 1960 and later purchased Schuck's Auto Supply. In 1983, he retired to devote his time to philanthropy.

Stroum had a close relationship with the University of Washington. He and his wife established a lecture series in Jewish Studies in 1975, and later endowed a Chair in Jewish Studies. Stroum served on the Board of Regents from 1985 to 1998. He was also awarded honorary doctorates from Brandeis University, Seattle University, and Whitworth College.
