= The Trump Group =

American developer of luxury condominiums unrelated to Donald Trump

The Trump Group, based in Aventura, Florida, is a developer of luxury condominiums and investor in private companies; it is not related to the Trump Organization, owned by Donald Trump. Its projects include Williams Island (Florida) in Aventura, Estates at Acqualina in Sunny Isles Beach, and Luxuria in Boca Raton.

== History ==
The company was founded by Jules and Eddie Trump (who are not related to Donald Trump), Jewish brothers who moved to the United States from South Africa in the 1970s. In 1980, the brothers began their first project, Williams Island in Aventura.

Initially based in New York, the company purchased the Seattle-based Pay 'n Save drug store chain in 1984. Shortly after the purchase, the publisher of the trade magazine Drugstore News mistakenly tried to sell Donald Trump a subscription. Donald Trump and the Trump Organization then unsuccessfully sued the Trump Group over the use of the Trump name. Trump then petitioned the United States Patent and Trademark Office to revoke the trademark registration which it did in 1988 because of the "likelihood of confusion".

== Philanthropy ==
Eddie and Jules Trump and their parents and sister co-founded and support Beit Issie Shapiro, an Israeli nonprofit organization for the treatment and care of children and adults with disabilities. The Eddie and Jules Trump Family Foundation supports teacher training and other programs in Israel.

Members of the Trump family also sponsored the creation of a Modern Orthodox synagogue in Williams Island, which is named after them.
