= Jean Coutu =

Jean Coutu may refer to:

- Jean Coutu (actor), actor from Quebec, Canada
- Jean Coutu (pharmacist), Quebec pharmacist
- Jean Coutu Group, Quebec business

== See also ==
- Coutu (disambiguation)
