= Longs Drugs =

Pharmacy company in Hawaii

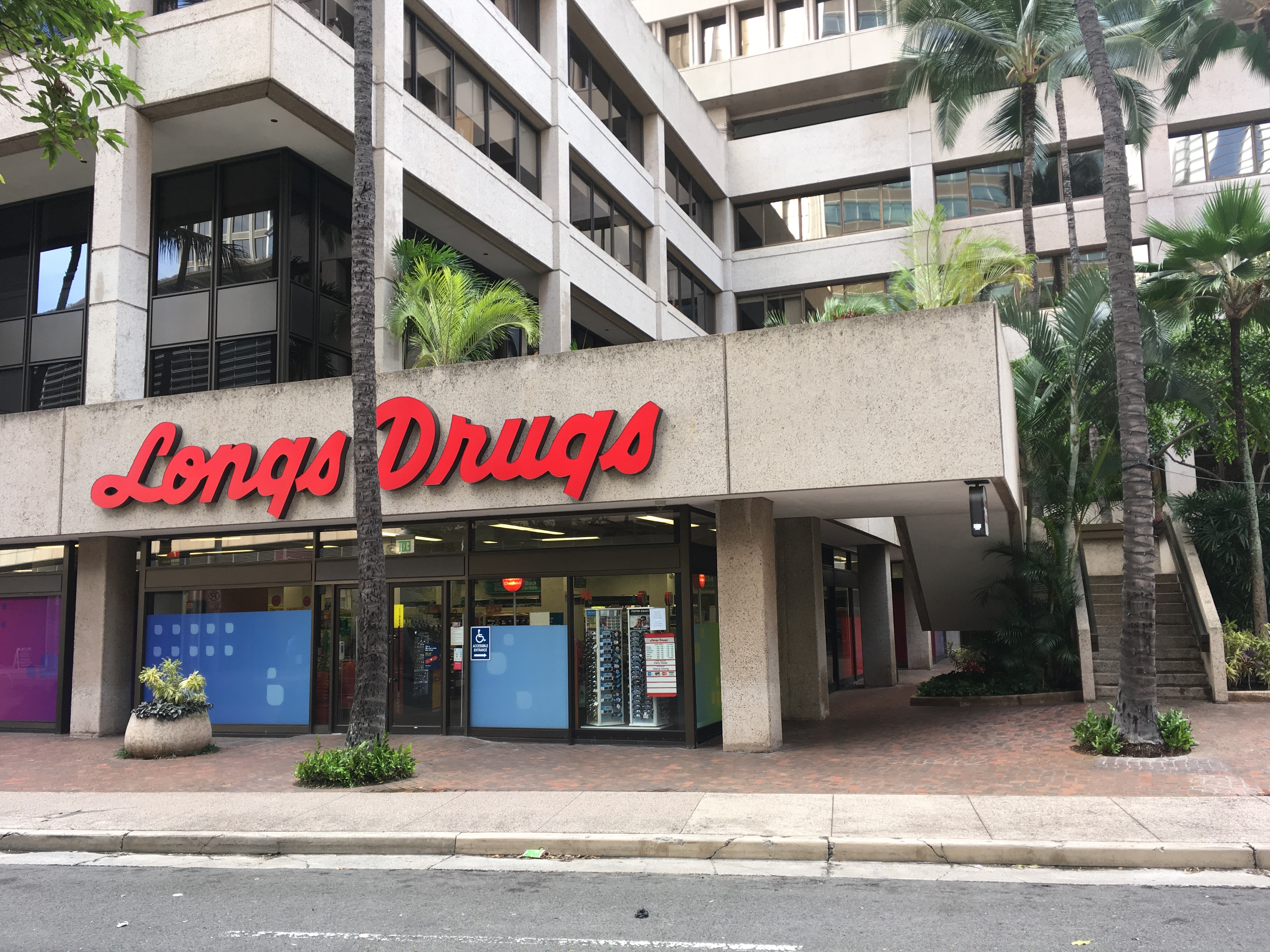
- Exterior of a Longs Drugs store in Downtown Honolulu (2016)
- Type: Subsidiary
- Industry: Retail
- Founded: 1938; 88 years ago in Oakland, California
- Founders: Thomas J. Long; Joseph Long
- Headquarters: Walnut Creek, California, United States (before acquisition)
- Area served: Hawaii (formerly Alaska, Arizona, California, Colorado, Nevada, Oregon, Utah, and Washington)
- Products: Pharmacy; cosmetics; health and beauty aids; general merchandise; snacks; 1 hour photo
- Parent: CVS Health (2008–present)
- Website: Longs Drugs

Longs Drugs (or just Longs) is an American chain owned by parent company CVS Health with approximately 70 drugstores throughout the state of Hawaii and formerly in the Continental US.

Before being acquired by CVS Health in late 2008, it was a chain of over 500 stores, located primarily on the West Coast of the United States. Besides Hawaii, it had stores located in California, Nevada, Arizona, Alaska, Colorado, Oregon, Utah and Washington, and was headquartered in Walnut Creek, California. As of 2026, it has more than 50 stores, all located in Hawaii.

== History ==
The first store was founded in 1938 as Longs Self-Service Drugs, by brothers Thomas and Joseph Long, with a loan from Joseph's father-in-law Marion Barton Skaggs, co-founder of Safeway Inc. The brothers opened their first store on Piedmont Avenue in Oakland, California. The company incorporated as Longs Stores in 1946. The first Longs in Hawaii opened on March 29, 1954, in Honolulu. In 1961, the company started using the Longs Drug Stores name and was first listed on the NASDAQ. The chain's 50th store opened in 1970. By 1971, Longs reported sales of $169 million (~$1000 million in 2024) from its 54 stores and was publicly listed on the New York Stock Exchange. by 1975, the chain had 82 stores.

The company expanded to Alaska in 1977, Arizona and Oregon in 1978, and Nevada in 1979. By 1982, Longs had 162 stores and exceeded $1 billion (~$2.74 billion in 2024) in sales. By 1985, Longs had reincorporated as Longs Drug Stores Corporation and was considered the fifth largest chain by sales, generating $1.21 billion on 178 stores. In 1987, Longs acquired 11 Osco drugstores in California and one in Colorado. They also sold 15 stores in Arizona to Osco. Their sales passed $2 billion (~$4.23 billion in 2024) for the first time in 1990.

Following the death of Joseph Long, his son Robert was named chairman and CEO in 1991. Responding to increased competition, Longs implemented a point of sale scanning system in 1992 and centralized the pharmacy business and set standardized chain-wide pricing. In 1993, Longs purchased Bill's Drugs, a 20-store chain located in Northern California, for $23.9 million (~$46.7 million in 2024). That same year, Longs also acquired six Thrifty PayLess stores in Hawaii.

In 1995, Longs formed Integrated Health Concepts, a Pharmacy Benefit Management company. In 1997, Longs and American Drug Stores Inc. (subsidiary of Albertson's Inc. at the time) merged their pharmacy benefit management companies to create RxAmerica, with each company retaining 50% ownership. That year, Longs also exited the Alaska market.

In 1998, Longs acquired 20 Drug Emporium in western Washington and Portland, Oregon from Western Drug Distributors. Following the acquisition of Genovese by Eckerd in November, Longs remained the last family-controlled drug chain in the country. Rite Aid sold 38 stores located in California to Longs for $150 million (~$265 million in 2024) in October 1999, which were all former PayLess Drug locations.

Long retired as CEO in 2000, the first time a member of the founding family was no longer leading the company. By this point, the company was starting to struggle against the major drug chains that had taken over the industry. In response, it revamped its supply chain operations and closed 14 underperforming stores. On September 17, 2001, Longs exercised its option to acquire Albertson's interest in RxAmerica and established full ownership of the PBM.

In 2002, Warren F. Bryant was named the company's new CEO. Long retired as chairman in 2003 and Bryant replaced him. In April 2003, the company announced the acquisition of the Sacramento, California-based American Diversified Pharmacies, a mail-order pharmacy. Under new management, Longs slashed corporate 170 corporate jobs, centralized buying and distribution, installed automated drug dispensers, and remodeled aging stores.

In 2006, RxAmerica began offering Medicare Part D prescription drug plans in 35 states and the District of Columbia. In June, Longs purchased Network Pharmaceuticals, which operated 24 pharmacies located close to hospitals, clinics, and medical office buildings, and were much smaller than Long's traditional retail stores. In January 2007, Longs also purchased four stores from PharMerica.

In March 2007, Longs Drugs announced it would be closing 31 stores in four Western states. The closures would eliminate its presence in Colorado, Washington, and Oregon. It opened the first retail-based medical clinic in Hawaii at the end of the year.

In 2007, Walgreens planned an expansion into Hawaii. As a result, Longs opened six new stores in the market that year.

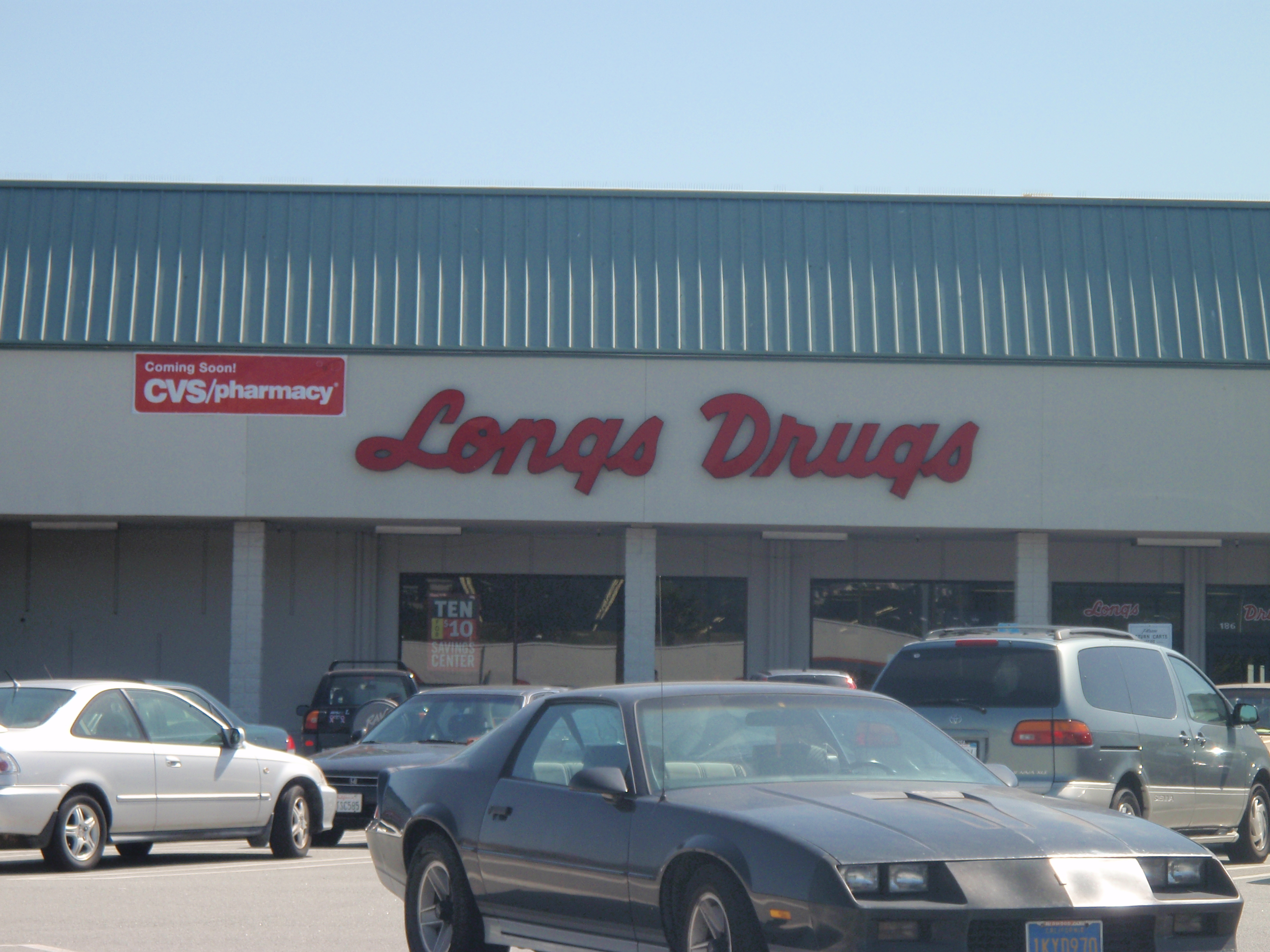
Storefront of Longs Drugs in South San Francisco, California, USA. Note sign announcing CVS/pharmacy coming soon.

=== Acquisition by CVS ===
On August 12, 2008, CVS announced that it would acquire the Longs Drugs chain of 521 stores to expand its presence on the West Coast, and gain access to the Northern California and Hawaii markets. CVS Health paid a total of $2.54 billion to acquire all outstanding shares of Longs Drugs.

On September 12, 2008, Walgreens stepped in with an offer representing a $3.50 (~$5.00 in 2024) per share premium over the cash purchase price offered by CVS. However, most of Longs' shareholders rejected the offer, citing regulation concerns. Walgreens dropped its offer on October 8, allowing CVS' deal to progress. On October 29, CVS had secured 78.07% of Longs shares, and Longs was merged into CVS the next day on October 30. Following the merger, the Longs corporate offices were shut down and 800 employees were let go.

The acquisition of Longs didn't prove to be an immediate success for CVS. Though it cemented the chain as the national leader, some California cities saw flat or even declining market share in the first few years. In 2011, CVS closed the 90,000 sq ft (8,400 m^{2}) flagship superstore on 5100 Broadway in Oakland, CA, due to property redevelopment plans.

=== Continuation in Hawaii ===
At the time of the acquisition, Longs had 39 stores in Hawaii. The Longs Drugs name was kept in the Hawaiian market "because of its high name recognition and the geographical separation." Management and employees would be retained, and no changes in store format were planned.

In an effort to combat Walgreens' expansion in Hawaii, CVS began a statewide expansion in 2010, with many new locations within a mile of an existing Longs Drugs. In July 2010, Longs opened the island's first full-size drive-through pharmacy in Pearl City. In 2014, CVS opened one new store in Honolulu and another in Kapa'a. Starting in April 2014, Longs started requiring customers to sign up for CVS Extracare cards to receive sale prices. In 2015, CVS acquired 10 Mina Pharmacy locations in Hawaii, and announced plans to operate six of them under the Longs Pharmacy name.

However, CVS closed two 'underperforming' stores in Honolulu in 2019. In 2022, the company closed two locations in Honolulu, one in Hilo, and another in Wahiawa. In June 2024, the company announced the closure of its Ewa Beach location. The Longs store in Ward Village closed in June 2025.

== Longs in popular culture ==
In 2005, Honolulu Advertiser columnist Lee Cataluna published a short-story collection, Folks You Meet in Longs, and Other Stories. It is based on Cataluna's eponymous play which premiered August 2003 at Kumu Kahua Theatre.

Between 1997 and 2008, Longs Drugs was the title sponsor of the Longs Drug and Challenge, a 72-hole golf tournament that was part of the LPGA Tour. After 10 years in the Sacramento area, the event moved to Danville in 2006. After CVS acquired Longs, it became the CVS/pharmacy LPGA Challenge in 2009 and 2010. CVS chose not to renew its contract with the LPGA in 2011.
