= Brooks Pharmacy =

American pharmacy chain

- Type: Pharmacy
- Founded: 1932; 94 years ago
- Defunct: June 4, 2007
- Fate: Acquired by Rite Aid
- Headquarters: Warwick, Rhode Island, U.S.
- Key people: Mary Sammons (president and CEO)
- Parent: Revco (1994); Jean Coutu Group (1994–2007)

Brooks Pharmacy was a chain of more than 330 pharmacies located throughout New England and New York and was a well-recognized name in the New England pharmacy industry for several decades. The corporate headquarters were located in Warwick, Rhode Island.

During its heyday in the late 1990s and early 2000s, Brooks was one of the premier regional drug chains in the United States, and was the second largest drug chain in New England, maintaining an especially strong presence in the states of Vermont, New Hampshire, and Rhode Island. In 2002, Brooks was recipient of the 2002 Rex Awards Regional Chain of the Year.

However, Brooks faced many difficulties between 2004 and 2006, as its parent company struggled unsuccessfully to integrate 1,500 Eckerd stores acquired from J.C. Penney with the existing Brooks network, resulting in a steady loss of market share and lagging same-store sales as CVS and Walgreens continued to expand and solidify their store base in the New England region. On June 4, 2007, Brooks Pharmacy officially announced the sale of the pharmacies to Rite Aid. The Brooks trade name, long associated with New England drug retailing, was retired.

== History ==
=== Beginnings ===
Brooks Pharmacy's roots are traced back to the defunct Adams Drug Company of Pawtucket, Rhode Island, a family owned operation founded in 1933 by the Salmanson family. Adams acquired several stores under the Brooks Drug banner in Vermont and New York, and also operated stores under several other trade names throughout the Northeast.

=== Sale to Pantry Pride ===
In 1984, Pantry Pride, a Florida-based supermarket chain, acquired the Adams Drug for $100 million. The acquisition included 420 stores in 10 Northeast states, 70% of which operated under the Brooks name. The following year, corporate raider Ronald Perelman engineered a takeover of Revlon, and all of Pantry Pride's assets, including Adams, were moved to the new company. In 1986, all Adams stores were converted to the Brooks trade name. For a period of time, ownership of Brooks was continually transferred between different Perelman-owned subsidiaries, including California-based Compact Video.

=== Acquisition by Hook-SupeRx ===
Perelman sold Brooks to the Indianapolis, Indiana-based Hook-SupeRx drug chain in 1988. Under Hook-SupeRx, Brooks assumed a new management team with Gayl W. Doster as COO, William Welsh in charge of operations, and David Morocco in charge of purchasing. They attempted to modernize the store base and turn around what had become a struggling chain. In 1991, Brooks developed the innovative RxWatch computerized prescription service. In 1992, Brooks began an aggressive attempt to expand into the New York City suburbs in the lower Hudson Valley and southwestern Connecticut. By 1993, it has 77 stores in New York and 356 overall.

=== Sale to Revco and Jean Coutu ===
In 1994, Revco acquired Brooks as part of its larger purchase of the Hook-SupeRx chain. At the time, the Brooks store base stretched from Maine to Maryland. Revco had no interest in operating the Brooks outlets in New England due to the company's positioning in the market. As a result, that same year, Revco sold 221 Brooks stores in Connecticut, Maine, Massachusetts, New Hampshire, Rhode Island and Vermont, as well as the Brooks warehouse and distribution facility in Connecticut, to the Quebec-based Jean Coutu Group for $147.5 million. Jean Coutu had already been operating stores in Rhode Island and Massachusetts through its U.S. subsidiary, under the Maxi Drug and Douglas Drug trade names.

Revco continued to operate 96 Brooks stores in New York and 31 in Pennsylvania, which later assumed the Revco banner. Jean Coutu rebranded its Maxi and Douglas stores as Brooks, which also became the trade name of Jean Coutu Group USA. However, some former Maxi stores were placed under the combined Brooks-Maxi banner.

Under the management of Jean Coutu, Brooks was successful for several years, growing and acquiring smaller chains and pieces of larger chains throughout the New England region. In 1995, Brooks acquired 30 Rite Aid locations in Massachusetts and Rhode Island. In exchange, Brooks sold 18 stores in Maine to Rite Aid. Brooks retained 121 stores in Massachusetts and 48 in Rhode Island. In 1999, Brooks acquired the Burlington, Vermont-based City Drug chain, increasing its Vermont store count to 30 and re-entering the New York market for the first time since the 1994 Revco acquisition. By 2001, Brooks had 250 stores in six states. That December, the chain purchased 80 Osco Drug stores in Maine, Massachusetts, and New Hampshire from Albertson's.

=== Merger with Eckerd ===
Shortly after the Osco acquisition, President Michel Coutu made a commitment to significantly increase the size of the chain by the year 2004. This expansion was accomplished in August 2004 with Coutu's acquisition of about 1,539 Eckerd Pharmacies as well as Eckerd's headquarters in Largo, Florida, from its then-parent company, J.C. Penney. Shortly after the acquisition, Brooks-Eckerd announced plans to build a $30 million headquarters in East Greenwich, Rhode Island.

By 2005, Coutu had merged the operations of the Brooks and Eckerd chains together at Brooks headquarters in Warwick, Rhode Island, shuttering the former Eckerd headquarters in Florida. Between 2005 and 2006, Coutu ran into many difficulties integrating the Brooks and Eckerd chains together, and as a result, Coutu's Brooks and Eckerd outlets experienced a significant decline in market share.

=== Acquisition by Rite Aid ===
In August 2006, Rite Aid announced it would buy Jean Coutu's US division, consisting of the Eckerd and Brooks chains, for $2.55 billion. The acquisition included 1,854 stores, six distribution centers, and made Rite Aid the largest drugstore chain on the East Coast. In 2007, Rite Aid acquired 31 Brooks stores in Vermont. All Brooks and Eckerd locations were either rebranded as Rite Aid, sold, or closed, and its proposed Rhode Island headquarters was abandoned.

The Jean Coutu Group (PJC) USA, Inc. (the company retained this name despite its divestiture by PJC in 2007) remained an active in-name-only subsidiary of Rite Aid, along with Eckerd Corporation, as shown in the latter company's October 2023 Chapter 11 bankruptcy filings.

On May 5, 2025, Rite Aid filed for Chapter 11 bankruptcy for the second time in 2 years, listing assets and liabilities between $1 billion and $10 billion. Rite Aid will sell all of its assets as part of its procedure, as it overcomes financial challenges such as debt, increased competition, and inflation, including Brooks Pharmacy.
