= Parkway Center Mall =

Coordinates: 40.423°N 80.036°W

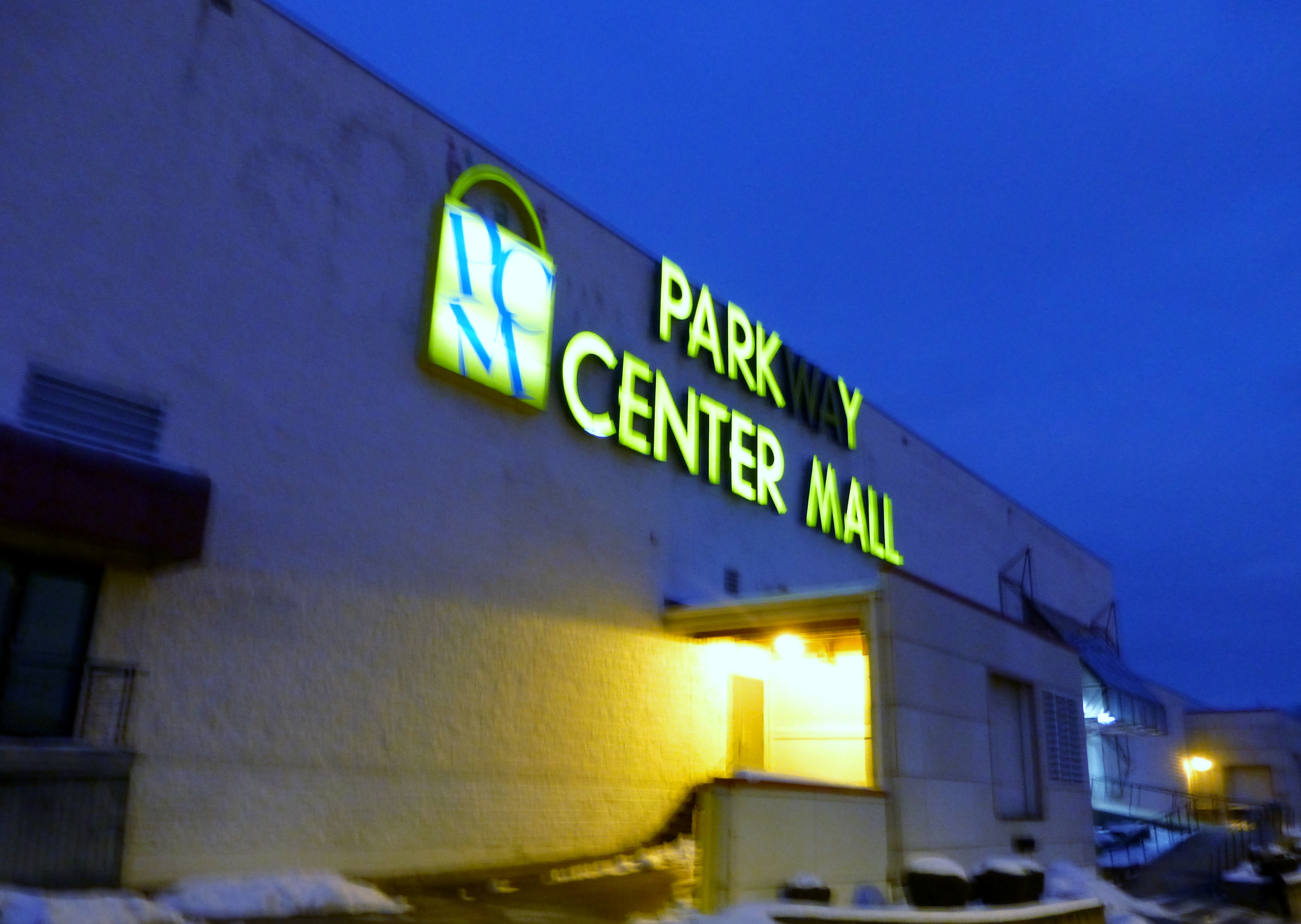
- Location: Pittsburgh, Pennsylvania, U.S.
- Address: Parkway Center Drive
- Opened: 4 November 1982; 44 years ago
- Closed: January 6, 2013
- Demolished: 2016 (Kmart/Giant Eagle had become standalone stores)
- Developer: Kossman Development
- Manager: Kossman Development
- Num. of stores: 80 (at peak)
- Num. of anchor tenants: 5 (all vacant as of June 2025)
- Floor area: 500,000 square feet (46,000 m^{2}; 4.6 ha; 11 acres)
- Floors: 2 (2016-) (Giant Eagle on lower floor with former Kmart above it); 3 (1985-2016)

Parkway Center Mall was an enclosed shopping mall in Pittsburgh, Pennsylvania that started operations in 1982. After structural issues, most of the mall tenants moved out. In 2016, the bulk of the mall was demolished, except for the Giant Eagle building. This last remaining store in operation closed in June 2025.

== History ==
Kossman Development opened Parkway Center Mall on November 4, 1982. The original anchor stores included Gold Circle, Giant Eagle, Zayre, Thrift Drug, and a David Weis catalog showroom. Other major tenants included Chi-Chi's, K·B Toys, RadioShack, Payless ShoeSource, and Jo-Ann Fabrics. An exit from Interstate 376 was built specifically to service the mall.

In 1986, Gold Circle became Kmart. Shortly thereafter, the foundation of the store shifted, resulting in a crack in the floor that ran the length of the store. Steel plates 8-inch (20 cm) wide were used to cover the gap.

Zayre closed its mall store in 1989, along with three other stores in the area.

In 1990, David Weis closed, and the space was converted to a Phar-Mor a year later. Also in 1990, the former Zayre became a Kaufmann's clearance center. By 1992, the Kaufman's clearance store was closed, and one-third of its space was converted to a CompUSA. The rest later became Syms Corporation.

In 1997, Thrift Drug became Eckerd when the latter bought out the chain.

In 1999, the arcade and food court were closed, with the food court later converted to a dance studio and a drivers' license office.

In 2002, Syms and Phar-Mor both closed. CompUSA moved to Robinson Town Centre.

By 2006, the center was largely vacant, with all tenants consolidated to the second floor after the first and third floors were closed to traffic. The mall building had foundation issues that caused it to shake as the building settled on the fill dirt on which it was built. Some of the vibrations were caused by truck traffic passing by on the nearby Interstate.

Kmart announced its closure in late 2012, with its last day of operation on January 6, 2013. After this closure, the last remaining tenants were shuttered or relocated within the month, including GNC, a sports apparel store, a nail salon, a martial arts studio and an optician.

In August 2016, the mall began to undergo demolition.

As of February 2019, the mall had been completely demolished except for the building housing Giant Eagle, formerly Kmart.

In June 2025, Giant Eagle, the last remaining tenant at the mall closed their doors, citing aging facilities and the inability to renew their lease. Giant Eagle directed customers to shop at the nearby Crafton or Noblestown Rd. locations.
