= Poonkiny, California =

Former settlement in California, U.S.

Coordinates: 39.71882°N 123.3331°W

Poonkiny is a former settlement in Mendocino County, California, United States. It was located 12 miles (19 km) southwest of Covelo.

A post office operated at Poonkiny from 1896 to 1900.

It is named after the word for wormwood in the language of the Yuki tribe.
