= Penn Fruit =

Former American grocery store chain

- Final logo, used from 1960
- Industry: Supermarket chains
- Founded: 1927; 99 years ago
- Founder: Isaac Kaplan; Morris Kaplan; Samuel Cooke
- Defunct: February 1979
- Fate: Bankruptcy
- Headquarters: United States

The Penn Fruit Company was a regional grocery chain in the Philadelphia and Baltimore areas that operated from 1927 until 1979. During the firm's history it was regarded as one of the most innovative American supermarket chains. However, the company's innovations were often copied by its bigger rivals, which contributed to the chain's demise.

== History ==
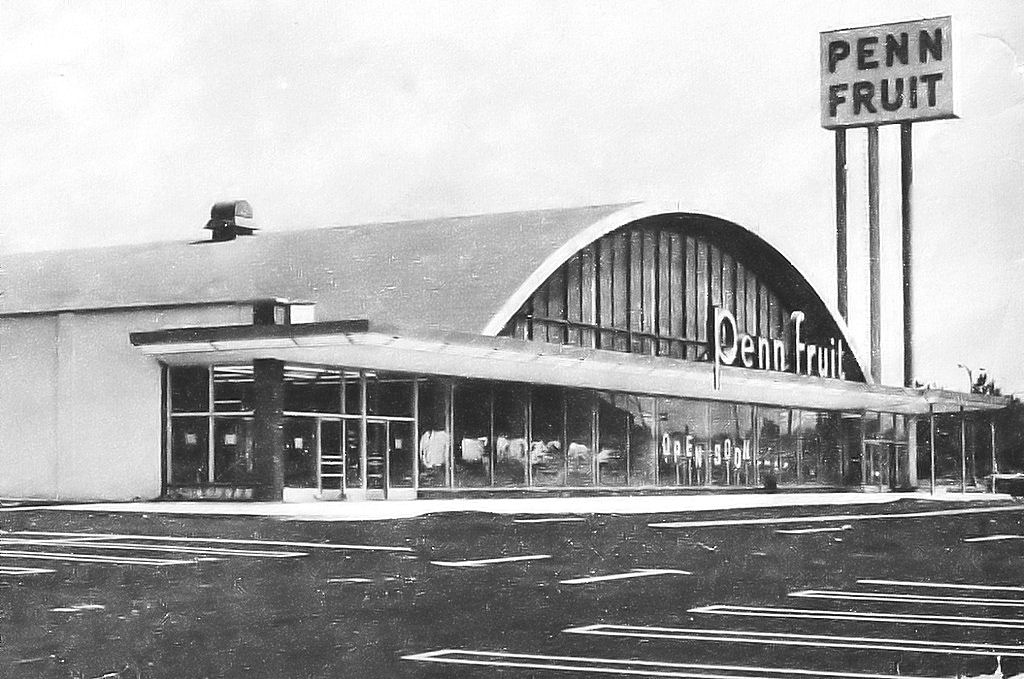
A Penn Fruit Supermarket in Allentown, Pennsylvania, 1958.

The company was founded in 1927 by three Philadelphia merchants—Morris Kaplan, Isaac Kaplan, and Samuel Cooke—as a produce store at 52nd and Market streets in Philadelphia. The store used low prices and heavy promotions to drive sales. The store was so successful that it was soon doing $10,000 a week in sales. The success of that initial store attracted John McClatchy, a local builder, to commission the young company to build a produce and seafood store in what would be Philadelphia's first shopping center.

By the early 1930s the company had grown to six stores, and although it did not want to add a full line of groceries to its fare, competition from established chains like Acme and A&P forced it into the grocery business. However, unlike the bigger chains, the company was so successful that it could easily transition its chain from smaller stores to larger supermarkets. Throughout the 1930s and 1940s, Penn Fruit expanded its older stores and added new ones throughout greater Philadelphia and New Jersey. It eventually added fresh meat departments to its stores and became one of the first chains to sell floral items. Because of its discount format and clean, high-volume self-service stores, the company was very popular in and around its core Philadelphia/New Jersey market. At least one Penn Fruit, in Pennsauken, New Jersey, had a bakery/doughnut area in the 1960s & 1970s, or until it closed. Featured were the lightest glazed doughnuts seen before or since.

After World War II and throughout the 1950s, the company expanded its territory, opening stores in both New York and Baltimore. However, the company was less than successful with these stores, partly because of their geographic distance from Philadelphia. Stores built in the 1950s had a distinctive design, topped by a wide sweeping arch roof. Some of these buildings are still in use today. In 2016, the former Penn Fruit store on Frankford Avenue, one of the last with an intact arch design, was recommended and approved for city landmark status.

In the 1960s, the company diversified, establishing chains of garden stores (Gaudio's), discount drug stores, and convenience food stores, buying a chain of Baltimore area supermarkets, as well as a toy chain called Kiddie City. But, the company's greatest success was in its core business: supermarkets. In 1964, the company launched a chain of discount supermarkets called Dale's, and three years later, opened the first in a chain of Consumers Warehouse Markets; most, if not all, of Dale's and CWM stores were rebrandings of existing Penn Fruit stores. By 1971, the company had nearly 80 stores and sales of $370 million (~$2.25 billion in 2025).

However, rivals such as A&P, Food Fair (later known as Pantry Pride) and Acme were opening discount stores of their own, and in 1973, Acme's 173 Philadelphia-area stores launched a price war against Penn Fruit's 12 warehouse markets. This move set off a series of events that would lead to the latter's downfall. After nearly two years, the bottom fell out. Penn Fruit, unable to compete, filed Chapter 11 bankruptcy and began selling off most of its non-supermarket holdings. It then later closed all but a handful of its supermarkets, including the last of its Baltimore division (now called Big Valu), which were sold to Food A Rama, a local Baltimore chain (now part of Shoppers Food & Pharmacy, a Supervalu division) with the remaining 17 stores sold to Food Fair in 1975. Some of the former Penn Fruit stores became Shop 'n Bag co-operative stores. Penn Fruit continued as a division of Pantry Pride until the latter filed bankruptcy two years later, with those units being absorbed by a variety of competitors.
