= Coutu =

Coutu is a surname. Notable people with the surname include:

== People ==
=== Surname ===
- Billy Coutu (1892–1978), Canadian ice hockey player
- Brandon Coutu (born 1984), American football player
- Christopher Coutu (born 1976), American army officer and politician
- Jack Coutu (1924–2017), English printmaker and sculptor
- Jean Coutu (actor) (1925–1999), Canadian actor from Quebec
- Jean Coutu (pharmacist) (born 1927), Canadian pharmacist from Quebec
- Richard Coutu (born 1951), Canadian ice hockey player
- Sarah-Ève Coutu-Godbout (born 1997), Canadian ice hockey player
- Sherry Coutu, Canadian-born British entrepreneur
- Taylor Coutu (born 1987), American golfer

=== Middle name ===
- Guillaume Coutu Dumont, Canadian electronic musician

== See also ==
- Jean Coutu Group, business in Quebec
- Augüera'l Coutu, one of 54 parishes in Cangas del Narcea, a municipality within the province and autonomous community of Asturias, Spain
