= Thrift Drug =

Defunct American pharmacy

- Industry: Public
- Founded: 1935
- Founder: Philip Hoffman and Reuben Helfant
- Defunct: 1997
- Fate: Purchased by JCPenney
- Successor: Eckerd, now CVS Pharmacy and Rite Aid
- Headquarters: Pittsburgh, Pennsylvania, United States
- Products: Pharmacy
- Parent: JCPenney

Thrift Drug was a U.S. pharmacy chain founded in 1935 and based in Pittsburgh, Pennsylvania.

== History ==
In 1935, pharmacists Philip Hoffman and Reuben Helfant came together to form the Thrift Drug Company. Their first stores opened in the Pittsburgh suburb of Sewickley in May, followed by Bellevue two weeks later. A third store was opened later that year, and they finished with $200,000 in sales. They incorporated the company in 1937.

By 1963, the chain spanned 115 stores across six states. Thrift Drug was purchased by JCPenney in November 1968 for $70 million in stocks. Hoffman died exactly a month later. The chain had 171 stores in 10 states by this point. The company was expanded greatly thereafter, serving as the flagship chain of JCPenney's pharmacy group.

Thrift Drug established Express Pharmacy Services, a mail order pharmacy, in January 1983. By 1986, the service had grown to four facilities and filled over 1.5 million prescriptions. By 1987, the company operated 400 stores in 18 states. In February 1993, Thrift sold 45 Treasury Drug stores in Georgia to Big B Drugs.

In January 1995, JCPenney announced its Thrift Drug unit would buy Kerr Drug, a 97-store chain in the North and South Carolina. By 1996, Thrift Drug was considered the eighth-largest drugstore chain in the country. In August, JCPenney agreed to acquire the Fay's Drug chain for $285 million. The acquisition added 272 stores in New York, Pennsylvania, Vermont, and New Hampshire, giving Thrift Drug 926 stores.

In October 1996, Rite Aid announced it would purchase the Thrifty PayLess chain for $2.3 billion. As part of that deal, 200 stores in North and South Carolina were sold to Thrift Drug. The following month, JCPenney announced it would purchase Eckerd and merge it with Thrift Drug. However, the FTC objected to the purchase due to JCPenney's dominant position in the Carolinas. JCPenney was forced to divest 161 stores in the area. These stores were purchased by an investment group led by former Thrift Drug executives, which became the new Kerr Drug chain.

In 1997, JCPenney merged Thrift Drug, and its other pharmacy chains, into Eckerd. JCPenney ultimately sold Eckerd to CVS and Jean Coutu Group in 2004.

Thrift Drug, Inc. remained an active subsidiary of Eckerd and later Rite Aid (owning stores held by the company at its closure), as shown in the latter company's October 2023 Chapter 11 bankruptcy filings.

On May 5, 2025, Rite Aid filed for Chapter 11 bankruptcy for the second time in 2 years, listing assets and liabilities between $1 billion and $10 billion. Rite Aid will sell all of its assets as part of its procedure, as it overcomes financial challenges such as debt, increased competition, and inflation, including Thrift Drug.

== In popular culture ==
One enduring legacy of Thrift Drug was in the 1977 movie Slap Shot, when a Thrift Drug located in downtown Johnstown, Pennsylvania was shown in the background during a shot of downtown Charlestown.
