= Fay's Drug =

American drugstore chain

Fay's Inc.
- Trade name: Fay's Drug
- Formerly: Fay's Drug Company, Inc.
- Type: Public
- Traded as: NYSE: FAY
- Industry: Retail, Drug store
- Founded: 1958; 68 years ago in Fairmount, New York
- Founders: Henry A. Panasci, Sr.; Henry Panasci, Jr.
- Defunct: 1997; 29 years ago
- Fate: Merged into Eckerd (then Rite Aid) Now Walgreens.
- Headquarters: Syracuse, New York
- Number of locations: 272 (1996)
- Products: Beauty products, drugs, snacks, beer, photo shop, movies, food and housewares.
- Subsidiaries: Wheels Discount Auto Supply; Paper Cutter

Fay's Drug was a chain of drug stores that was founded in 1958 in Fairmount, New York. At its height, Fay's Drugs operated its core business, along with Wheels Discount Auto Supply and The Paper Cutter.

At its peak there were over 300 stores operating in New York and Northeast Pennsylvania. Fay's enjoyed #1 market share in Buffalo, Rochester, Syracuse and Albany.

== History ==
=== Beginning ===
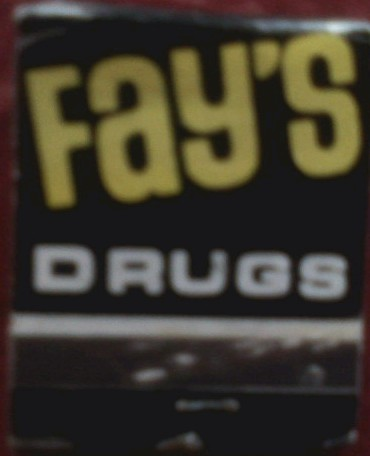
A Fay's brand matchbook from the 1970s

In 1958, the first Fay's Drug Store was opened in Fairmount, New York by Henry A. Panasci, Jr. and his father Henry Panasci Sr. The store was named after Faye Panasci, wife of Henry Panasci, Jr. Her name was Faye, but they intentionally left off the e to save money on signage.

Fay's steadily grew in Central New York—the resulting Fay's Drugs Company, Inc. was incorporated on October 20, 1966 and Fay's Drugs opened its headquarters in Syracuse, New York with the bulk of its operations residing in Liverpool, New York.

=== Public company ===
The company went public in 1969 and entered the Rochester market in 1971. In 1979, Fay's acquired the Key Drug store chain in Rochester, NY and converted them to Fay's, further expanding their Rochester area market. It also expanded into North and South Carolina that year by purchasing the Mann and Crafts drug chains. Increased supplier costs ate into profitability, and by April 1981, Fay's sold its 31 drug stores in those states to the Rite Aid. The sale reduced the size of the chain to 80 stores in upstate New York and one in Pennsylvania. Fay's installed a computerized pharmacy system in 1982. It traded on the American Stock Exchange until moving to the New York Stock Exchange in December 1982.

In 1991, Fay's Drugs acquired the 48 drug stores operated by Victory Markets as Carls Drugs. Carls Drugs was founded by Carl Panasci, brother and uncle to the Fay's Drugs founders. In January 1993, Fay's sold 10 underperforming Pennsylvania-based stores to Melville Corporation and acquired one CVS store in upstate New York. Henry Sr. died in May, at the age of 95. By this point, Fay's operated 245 drugstores in New Hampshire, New York, Pennsylvania, and Vermont, as well as 31 Wheels Discount Auto Supply Stores and 25 Paper Cutter stores in New York. In July 1994, Fay's acquired the 12-store Peterson drug store chain based in Western New York.

=== Diversification efforts ===
In the mid-1980s, Fay's made an effort to diversify by opening Wheels Discount Auto Supply and Paper Cutter stores. However, these efforts proved to be short-lived. By the mid-1990s, Fay's Drugs decide to divest itself of its non-core subsidiaries.

The company closed nine under-performing stores in its Paper Cutter subsidiary in April 1993. In December 1995, the company sold its 82-store Wheels Discount Auto Supply subsidiary in New York and Pennsylvania to the Sears-owned Western Auto Supply for $37 million (~$69.4 million in 2024).

In 1996, the company sold its remaining 29 Paper Cutter stores to Long Island-based Party Experience Inc., a chain of party- and holiday-oriented supply stores. The stores were converted to the Party Experience format the following year.

=== Sale to JCPenney ===
In 1996, Fay's Drugs was sold to JCPenney for $285 million in stock. New York stores retained the Fay's name, while those in other states were changed to Thrift Drug stores. JCPenney merged its drug operations into Eckerd in 1997. Many of the original Fay's Drugs locations that have not been closed in favor of stand-alone Eckerd stores (many now Rite Aid and Walgreens locations) still feature the familiar Fay's aisle and pharmacy formats that served as models for drug chains nationwide.

In 2023, Rite Aid, the successor to Eckerd, filed for Chapter 11 bankruptcy amid several opioid lawsuits and declining sales. The Jean Coutu Group (PJC) USA, Inc. (the company retained this name despite its divestiture by PJC in 2007) remained an active in-name-only subsidiary of Rite Aid, along with Eckerd Corporation, as shown in the latter company's October 2023 Chapter 11 bankruptcy filings. On May 5, 2025, Rite Aid filed for Chapter 11 bankruptcy for the second time in 2 years, listing assets and liabilities between $1 billion and $10 billion. Rite Aid will sell all of its assets as part of its procedure, as it overcomes financial challenges such as debt, increased competition, and inflation, including Eckerd and Fay's Drug.
