= Adams Drug Company =

American drugstore chain

- Company type: Privately held company
- Industry: Retail
- Founded: 1932; 94 years ago in Woonsocket, Rhode Island
- Founders: Leonard Salmanson together with family members Barnett, Samuel, Donald and Charles
- Defunct: 1986
- Fate: Acquired and rebranded
- Successor: Brooks Pharmacy (later Rite Aid)
- Headquarters: Connecticut, United States
- Number of locations: 500 stores at peak
- Area served: Northeast United States
- Products: Pharmaceutical drugs, cosmetics, tobacco, camera supplies and health and wellness products
- Number of employees: 5,000 (1984)

Adams Drug Company was an American drugstore chain founded in the 1930s by Leonard Salmanson.

== History ==
Leonard I. Salmanson together with his father Barnett Salmanson and brothers Samuel, Donald and Charles, opened the family's first stores in 1932 under the name Adams Drug Company in Woonsocket and Pawtucket, Rhode Island, selling health and beauty aids and assorted sundries.

Expansion and acquisitions produced one of the largest drugstore chains in the country, with over 500 stores in 14 states employing more than 5,000 people.

Under Leonard's leadership, the Salmanson family also diversified into manufacturing and real estate holdings, purchasing the Gong Bell Mfg. Co., in East Hampton, Connecticut, a toy business, the Clover Bead & Jewelry Co., in Pawtucket, and the Colt Plastics Co., North Grosvernordale, Connecticut.

Always seeking to attract new industry, the Salmanson family formed the Ivy Co. to purchase the former Raycrest Mills, in Pawtucket; Wanskuck Buildings Inc., to develop the former Wanskuck Mills, Providence; and the Drake Co., to buy and develop a 180,000-square-foot (17,000 m^{2}) industrial site on Webster Street in Pawtucket.

Many trace Brooks Pharmacy's roots back to Adams Drug Company. At that time Adams acquired several hundred stores under the Brooks Drug banner in Vermont and New York, and also operated stores under several other different trade names throughout the Northeast.

In 1984, Pantry Pride, a defunct Florida-based supermarket chain acquired the Adams Drug Company, which had then consisted of about 500 stores throughout the Northeast. The following year, all of Pantry Pride's assets including Adams, were acquired by corporate raider Ronald Perelman's Revlon subsidiary. Shortly after the Perelman acquisition, in 1986, all Adams stores were converted over to the Brooks trade name.

In 2023, Rite Aid, the successor to Brooks, filed for Chapter 11 bankruptcy. On May 5, 2025, Rite Aid filed for Chapter 11 bankruptcy for the second time in 2 years, listing assets and liabilities between $1 billion and $10 billion.
