= Kerr Drug =

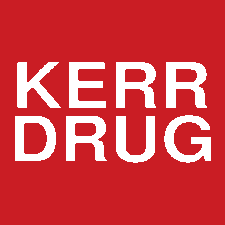

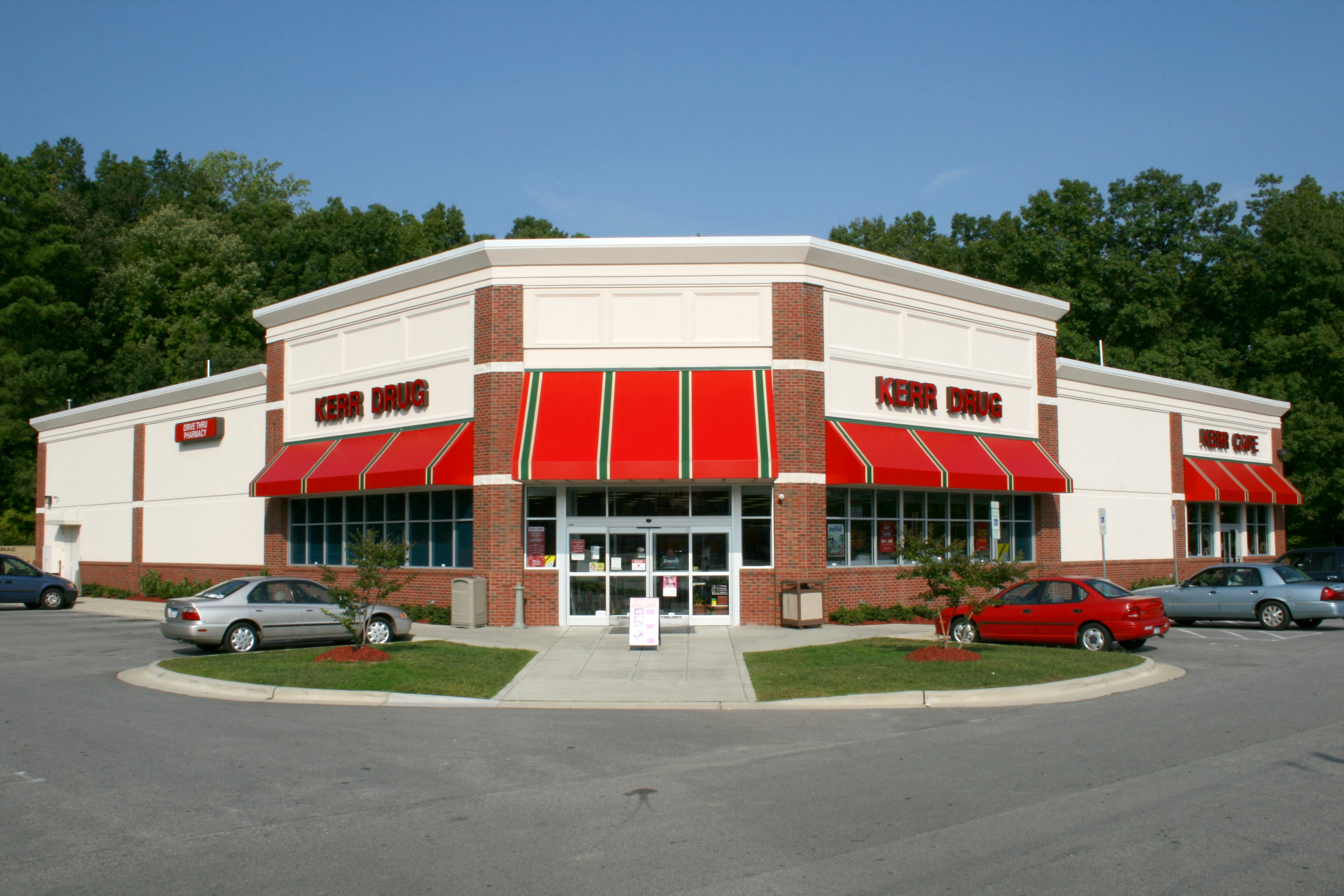
- A Kerr Drug located in Hillsborough
- Type: Drug Store
- Predecessor: Kerr Drug
- Founded: 1951
- Founder: Banks Kerr
- Defunct: 2013
- Fate: Merged with Walgreens
- Successor: Walgreens
- Headquarters: Raleigh, NC, United States
- Number of locations: 76
- Area served: North Carolina
- Products: Premier
- Owner: Walgreens

Kerr Drug was an American chain of drug stores throughout North Carolina. Its headquarters were located in Raleigh, North Carolina. On September 10, 2013, Walgreens announced its purchase of Kerr.

Over the years, Kerr built a reputation as an innovative and community-first clinical pharmacy. Kerr often partnered with local physicians and universities, offering clinical services that were prioritized over prescription fulfillment.

== History ==
The company was founded by Banks Kerr in 1951. Kerr had graduated as valedictorian from the University of North Carolina School of Pharmacy. The chain's first location was at the University Mall in Chapel Hill.

In January 1995, Thrift Drug, owned by JCPenney, acquired the 97-store chain. When JCPenney attempted to purchase Eckerd Drug, the FTC required the divestment of 161 drug stores in North Carolina and South Carolina. New Kerr Drug, a new entity owned by Thrift's former president, acquired the stores.

In 2002, UNC-Chapel Hill's School of Pharmacy dedicated the Banks D. Kerr Hall to the drug chain's founder.

In May 2009, Kerr Drug sold its 11 stores in the Charleston, South Carolina to CVS in order to focus on its North Carolina market. The sale left Kerr with 90 stores. At the same time, Kerr introduced its Naturally Kerr store-within-a-store format that added natural, homeopathic, and organic health care and food products. The format started in Raleigh and Asheville. By August, the concept was successful enough that a third location in Chapel Hill was announced. By the following year, the chain operated three health care centers and 10 clinical hubs.

In 2013, Walgreens purchased all 76 of the remaining Kerr Drug stores and its distribution center for $173 million. Kerr's long-term care pharmacy business was not included in the sale. The new owner closed 20 locations and the converted the remaining to the Walgreens name. Kerr's headquarters in Raleigh were closed in August 2014.
