= Marion Barton Skaggs =

American businessman

- Born: April 5, 1888; Newtonia, Missouri, US
- Died: May 8, 1976 (aged 88); Oakland, California, US
- Occupation: businessman
- Relatives: Joseph Long (son-in-law); Thomas J. Long (nephew-in-law)

Marion Barton Skaggs (April 5, 1888 – May 8, 1976) was an American businessman and leading member of the Skaggs Family of retailers who expanded the predecessor of Safeway into a major supermarket chain.

== Career ==
Skaggs was an advocate of the cash-and-carry system for grocery stores. His father, S.M. Skaggs, was a Baptist minister, and he was convinced that the prevailing system of credit increased prices since grocers and storekeepers had to wait to get paid and made the customers overly dependent on those grocers and storekeepers. His father established a store in American Falls, Idaho. He sold groceries for cash and passed the savings from not offering credit to customers in the form of lower prices.

On August 15, 1915, Skaggs bought the store from his father for $1,088 (equivalent to $34,600 in 2025), and he continued the cash-and-carry business strategy helping him amass wealth and prominence in the grocery retailing industry. Skaggs' aversion to credit sales is exemplified by an admonition about "the growing evil of installment purchasing".

Skaggs was also against the prevailing high-cost system of the grocer having clerks serving all the needs of each customer. He was an early proponent of the self-service concept. Items were kept within the customers' reach, on shelves that hugged the walls, with aisles clear for customers to walk comfortably. Customers picked up baskets as they entered the store, selected what they wanted from the shelves, and paid for their purchases at a checkout counter. When he purchased the store from his father in 1915, his home was 20 miles (32 km) away, and he rode home on horseback each Saturday night, weather permitting. Two years later, Skaggs opened a second store, in Burley, Idaho, which he decided his brother L.S. Skaggs should manage. Before the second store could open, however, the United States was in World War I, and his brother enlisted in the military. The store's opening was delayed a year, until 1918. By 1921, Skaggs owned multiple stores in Idaho and Montana.

Skaggs' stores still had limited room, and some of his customers wanted to buy large quantities to store for winter use, larger quantities than his store could hold at one time. Skaggs contracted for a train-load of peaches to be brought to town, and he announced that the peaches would be sold directly from the railroad tracks when it arrived. Skaggs sold the first load of peaches within a few hours, the second load soon afterwards, and the third load was halfway sold when the marshall stopped the sale because the city council had decided it was unsafe to sell merchandise from the door of a train car. In response, Skaggs piled the peaches on the sidewalk, and he sold them right there. Skaggs continued this method for cabbages and other produce.

Skaggs moved to Portland, Oregon's Alameda neighborhood in 1921. He opened four more that year, and it grew to a 418-store chain by 1926, becoming the dominant element of the Safeway Company.

In 1926, Skaggs' company bought a chain of stores, called Skaggs Cash Stores, developed by his older brother O.P. Skaggs. The same year, Skaggs' company merged with Sam Selig's Southern California-based stores, some of which were called Safeway Stores. Skaggs decided that the stores should not carry his name after his eventual death. He first renamed them Skaggs-Safeway, and then he renamed them all Safeway by 1928.

In 1931, Skaggs sold controlling interest to Wall Street's Charles E. Merrill, became chief executive of the company, and retired from the Board of Directors in 1941.
