= Hills Supermarkets =

Grocery store in New York, USA

Hills Supermarkets,was a New York based grocery store chain which was popular in the 1960s. In May 1977 it was sold as a subdivision of Pueblo International Inc., to Pantry Pride.

== Growth ==
In March 1955 Hills Supermarkets leased 12,000 square feet (1,100 m^{2}) in the Pine Oaks Shopping Center at Boundary Avenue in North Massapequa, New York. The following month Hills signed a fifteen-year lease for a store to be located at the Hub Shopping Center, approximately one mile north of Amityville, New York.

In October 1961 Hills operated 23 stores with plans to open 7 more and expand an 8th within the next twelve months. Each planned store was to be 22,000 square feet (2,000 m^{2}) except for one. The exception was a store in the Walt Whitman Shopping Center in Huntington, New York, which measured 29,000 square feet.

By December 1972, the Hills chain had 75 locations.

== Demise of store chain ==
In the two years prior to November 1976, Pablo International, Inc., had closed 29 Hills stores as well as a distribution center in Brentwood, New York. The indebted 43 units of Hills Supermarkets sold for a sum of approximately $7 million in 1977, to Food Fair. Food Fair filed for Chapter 11 bankruptcy in October 1978, and 42 Hills locations were closed shortly thereafter. In 1979, at the height of the roller disco era the Hills located at 1276 Hicksville Rd, Seaford, NY 11783 became a United Skates of America which is still in operation.
