= Covelo, California =

Covelo
- Census-designated place
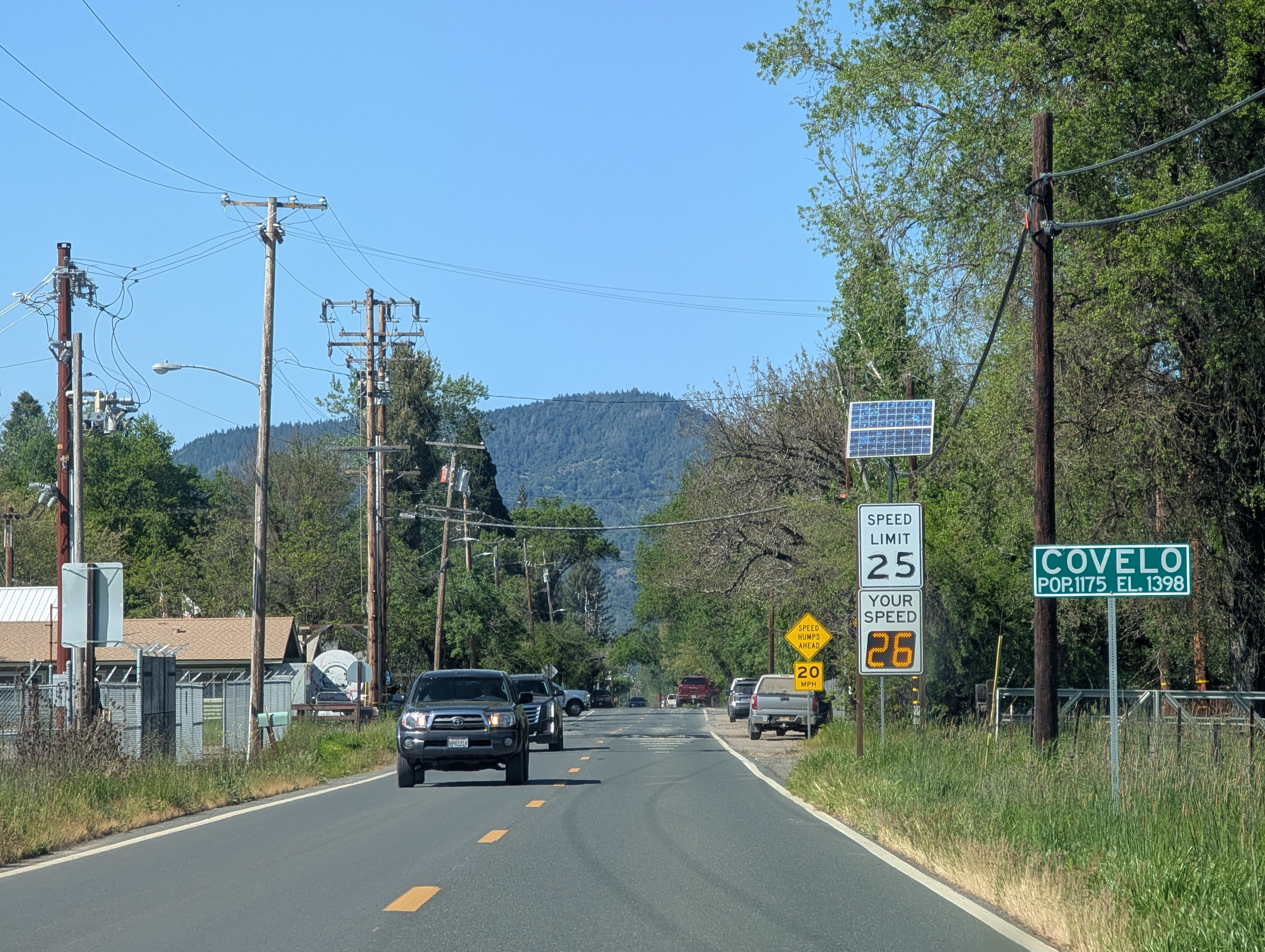
- SR-162 entering Covelo

- Location in Mendocino County and the state of California
- Coordinates: 39°47′35″N 123°14′53″W
- Country: United States
- State: California
- County: Mendocino

Area
  - Total: 7.14 sq mi (18.49 km^{2})
  - Land: 7.10 sq mi (18.38 km^{2})
  - Water: 0.042 sq mi (0.11 km^{2}) 0.60%
- Elevation: 1,398 ft (426 m)

Population (2020)
  - Total: 1,394
  - Density: 196.5/sq mi (75.86/km^{2})
- Time zone: UTC-8 (Pacific (PST))
  - Summer (DST): UTC-7 (PDT)
- ZIP code: 95428
- Area code: 707
- FIPS code: 06-16728
- GNIS feature ID: 0277603

Covelo (/koʊˈveɪloʊ/ koh-VAY-loh) is a census-designated place (CDP) in Mendocino County, California, United States. Covelo is located 14 miles (23 km) east-northeast of Laytonville, at an elevation of 1,398 feet (426 m). The population was 1,394 at the 2020 census, up from 1,255 at the 2010 census. 405 acres (1.64 km^{2}) of Covelo is part of the Round Valley Indian Reservation.

== Geography ==
Covelo is located in northeastern Mendocino County at 39°47′35″N 123°14′53″W. It is accessible via California State Route 162, which leads southwest 29 miles (47 km) to U.S. Route 101 at Longvale. To the east, Mendocino Pass Road (becoming Alder Springs Road) leads 66 miles (106 km) over the mountains of Mendocino National Forest to Elk Creek, for much of its length a gravel road.

Covelo covers 7.1 square miles (18 km^{2}) of land, 405 acres (1.64 km^{2}) of which is part of the Round Valley Indian Reservation. Of the total area, 99.40% is land and 0.60% is water. Covelo and Round Valley are drained by Mill Creek, which flows east to the Middle Fork of the Eel River.

=== Vineyards and agriculture ===
Covelo is an American Viticultural Area (AVA) established on February 15, 2006, by the Alcohol and Tobacco Tax and Trade Bureau (TTB), Treasury. The AVA includes Round and Williams Valleys, situated approximately 45 miles (72 km) north of Ukiah, and spans 59 square miles (38,000 acres).

Like the rest of Mendocino County, a large part of Covelo's economy comes from growing grapes for wine but also cattle ranching.

=== Climate ===
According to the Köppen Climate Classification system, Covelo has a hot-summer Mediterranean climate, abbreviated Csa on climate maps. Covelo has a four-season climate, with the dry part of the year during summer and the rainy part in the winter. Winters are mild in Covelo. Although snowfall is heavy on the nearby mountains such as Anthony Peak in the winter, it is usually light in the valley. Diurnal temperature variation is large year round, albeit widest in summer. During winter, the variation results in frequent frosts.

Climate data for Covelo (1894–2012)
Month	Jan	Feb	Mar	Apr	May	Jun	Jul	Aug	Sep	Oct	Nov	Dec	Year
Record high °F (°C)	78 (26)	82 (28)	88 (31)	94 (34)	104 (40)	108 (42)	114 (46)	115 (46)	114 (46)	104 (40)	88 (31)	75 (24)	115 (46)
Mean daily maximum °F (°C)	52.3 (11.3)	57.4 (14.1)	62.1 (16.7)	68.2 (20.1)	76.2 (24.6)	84.6 (29.2)	93.5 (34.2)	92.7 (33.7)	88.2 (31.2)	75.5 (24.2)	59.2 (15.1)	51.7 (10.9)	71.8 (22.1)
Mean daily minimum °F (°C)	30.4 (−0.9)	32.7 (0.4)	35.1 (1.7)	37.4 (3.0)	42 (6)	47.2 (8.4)	51.6 (10.9)	49.6 (9.8)	45 (7)	39.1 (3.9)	34.3 (1.3)	31.8 (−0.1)	39.7 (4.3)
Record low °F (°C)	7 (−14)	10 (−12)	18 (−8)	22 (−6)	27 (−3)	31 (−1)	37 (3)	37 (3)	28 (−2)	17 (−8)	14 (−10)	−9 (−23)	−9 (−23)
Average precipitation inches (mm)	7.94 (202)	6.91 (176)	5.45 (138)	2.88 (73)	1.69 (43)	0.49 (12)	0.04 (1.0)	0.18 (4.6)	0.44 (11)	0.44 (11)	5.56 (141)	8.69 (221)	40.71 (1,033.6)
Average snowfall inches (cm)	2.1 (5.3)	1 (2.5)	0.8 (2.0)	0.1 (0.25)	0 (0)	0 (0)	0 (0)	0 (0)	0 (0)	0 (0)	0.2 (0.51)	0.6 (1.5)	4.8 (12)
Average precipitation days	13	12	12	9	6	2	0	1	2	5	11.5	13.5	87
Source: WRCC

== History ==
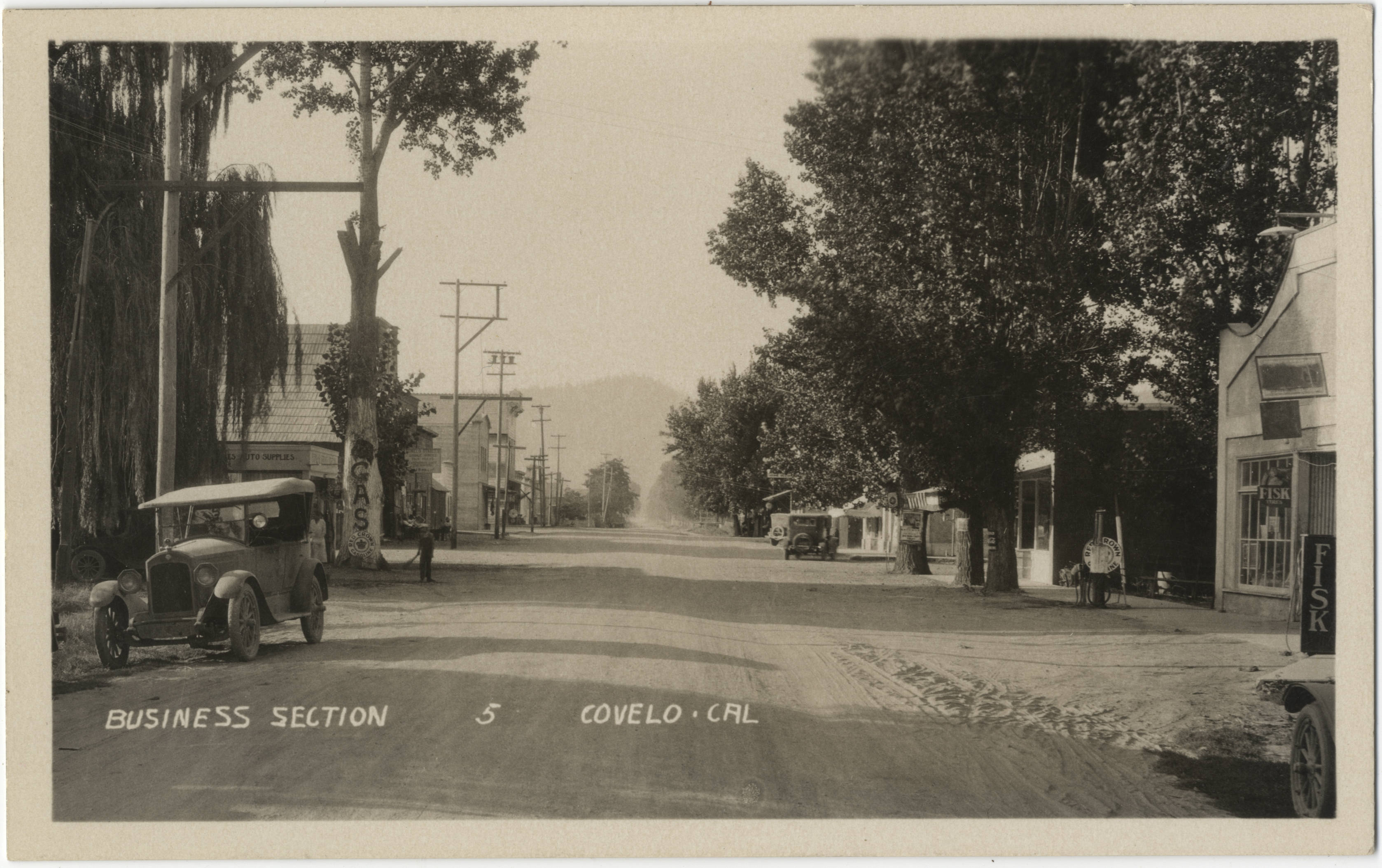
Downtown Covelo c. 1920

Covelo began in 1860, with the opening of the town's first store. The post office opened in 1870. and some sources claim that the town was named by Charles H. Eberle after a fortress in Switzerland. However, there is no place mentioned in the gazetters of Switzerland. Covelo may be a misspelling of Covolo, a fort in Pederobba, Veneto, Italy, which is near Switzerland. Alternatively, it could be named after Covelo, a village in Galicia, Spain. There is also a Covello in Basilicata, in the south of Italy.

== Demographics ==
Historical population
Census	Pop.	Note	%±
1880	183		—
1980	1,448		—
1990	1,057		−27.0%
2000	1,175		11.2%
2010	1,255		6.8%
2020	1,394		11.1%
2021 (est.)	1,317	▼	−5.5%
U.S. Decennial Census; 1850–1870 1880-1890; 1900 1910 1920; 1930 1940 1950; 1960 1970 1980; 1990 2000 2010

=== Racial and ethnic composition ===
Demographics of Covelo (2000–
Racial and ethnic composition	2000	2010	2020
Hispanic or Latino (of any race)	8.09%	12.99%	35.01%
White (non-Hispanic)	48.26%	43.35%	33.86%
Native American (non-Hispanic)	36.6%	35.78%	24.46%
Two or more races (non-Hispanic)	5.96%	6.14%	6.1%
Other (non-Hispanic)	0.0%	0.24%	0.36%
Black or African American (non-Hispanic)	0.77%	1.04%	0.07%
Asian (non-Hispanic)	0.34%	0.48%	0.07%
Pacific Islander (non-Hispanic)	0.0%	0.0%	0.07%

=== 2020 census ===
As of the 2020 census, Covelo had a population of 1,394 and a population density of 196.5 inhabitants per square mile (75.9/km^{2}). The racial makeup of Covelo was 522 (37.4%) White, 1 (0.1%) African American, 377 (27.0%) Native American, 1 (0.1%) Asian, 1 (0.1%) Pacific Islander, 280 (20.1%) from other races, and 212 (15.2%) from two or more races. Hispanic or Latino of any race were 488 persons (35.0%).

The whole population lived in households. There were 493 households, out of which 159 (32.3%) had children under the age of 18 living in them, 194 (39.4%) were married-couple households, 43 (8.7%) were cohabiting couple households, 116 (23.5%) had a female householder with no spouse or partner present, and 140 (28.4%) had a male householder with no spouse or partner present. 131 households (26.6%) were one person, and 59 (12.0%) were one person aged 65 or older. The average household size was 2.83. There were 322 families (65.3% of all households).

The age distribution was 361 people (25.9%) under the age of 18, 107 people (7.7%) aged 18 to 24, 434 people (31.1%) aged 25 to 44, 306 people (22.0%) aged 45 to 64, and 186 people (13.3%) who were 65 years of age or older. The median age was 35.4 years. For every 100 females, there were 125.2 males, and for every 100 females age 18 and over there were 131.6 males.

There were 546 housing units, of which 53 (9.7%) were vacant, and 493 (90.3%) were occupied. Of the occupied units, 302 (61.3%) were owner-occupied and 191 (38.7%) were occupied by renters. The homeowner vacancy rate was 0.0% and the rental vacancy rate was 1.0%.

0.0% of residents lived in urban areas, while 100.0% lived in rural areas.

=== 2010 census ===
At the 2010 census Covelo had a population of 1,255. The population density was 175.8 inhabitants per square mile (67.9/km^{2}). The racial makeup of Covelo was 611 (48.7%) White, 14 (1.1%) African American, 475 (37.8%) Native American, 10 (0.8%) Asian, 0 (0.0%) Pacific Islander, 49 (3.9%) from other races, and 96 (7.6%) from two or more races. Hispanic or Latino of any race were 163 people (13.0%).

The census reported that 1,247 people (99.4% of the population) lived in households, no one lived in non-institutionalized group quarters and 8 (0.6%) were institutionalized.

There were 481 households, 148 (30.8%) had children under the age of 18 living in them, 146 (30.4%) were opposite-sex married couples living together, 81 (16.8%) had a female householder with no husband present, 56 (11.6%) had a male householder with no wife present. There were 70 (14.6%) unmarried opposite-sex partnerships, and 0 (0%) same-sex married couples or partnerships. 148 households (30.8%) were one person and 53 (11.0%) had someone living alone who was 65 or older. The average household size was 2.59. There were 283 families (58.8% of households); the average family size was 3.25.

The age distribution was 339 people (27.0%) under the age of 18, 105 people (8.4%) aged 18 to 24, 320 people (25.5%) aged 25 to 44, 299 people (23.8%) aged 45 to 64, and 192 people (15.3%) who were 65 or older. The median age was 35.8 years. For every 100 females, there were 97.3 males. For every 100 females age 18 and over, there were 99.6 males.

There were 542 housing units at an average density of 75.9 per square mile, of the occupied units 314 (65.3%) were owner-occupied and 167 (34.7%) were rented. The homeowner vacancy rate was 2.2%; the rental vacancy rate was 3.4%. 791 people (63.0% of the population) lived in owner-occupied housing units and 456 people (36.3%) lived in rental housing units.

=== Income and poverty ===
In 2023, the US Census Bureau estimated that the median household income was $35,735, and the per capita income was $16,504. About 49.6% of families and 46.0% of the population were below the poverty line.

== Politics ==
In the state legislature, Covelo is in the 2nd senatorial district, represented by Democrat Mike McGuire, and the 2nd Assembly district, represented by Democrat Chris Rogers.

Federally, Covelo is in California's 2nd congressional district, represented by Democrat Jared Huffman.

== Education ==
Round Valley Elementary and Round Valley High School serve as the town's schools. There is also a charter school: Eel River Charter School.

== Notable people ==
- Michelle Lambert, pop singer
- Thomas J. and Joseph M. Long, brothers who co-founded Longs Drugs Stores; born and raised in Covelo
