= Genovese Drug Stores =

Defunct American pharmacy chain

- Industry: Pharmacy
- Founded: 1924; 102 years ago
- Defunct: Sold: 1998; 28 years ago Brand retired: 2003; 23 years ago
- Fate: Acquired by Eckerd
- Headquarters: Melville, New York
- Products: Pharmacy, Cosmetics, Health and Beauty Aids, General Merchandise, Snacks

Genovese Drug Stores was a pharmacy chain with stores in New York City, Long Island, northern New Jersey, Fairfield County, Connecticut, and Hartford County, Connecticut. It was acquired by JCPenney in 1998 and merged with its Eckerd Corporation subsidiary.

== History ==
Genovese Drug Stores was founded in 1924 by Joseph Genovese in Astoria, Queens. In 1955, Joseph W. Genovese Jr., the son of the founder and the chairman of the board, introduced self‐service in the chain.

Joseph Jr. died in December 1975 at the age of 46 after undergoing surgery. His father died in November 1978 at the age of 75. His second son, Leonard Genovese, replaced him as chairman.

By 1978, the chain had 50 locations with headquarters in Melville, New York. In the early 1980s, some locations added arcade video games as an alternative source of revenue. Genovese also operated Genrex, a nursing home division during this time. The company opened its first Manhattan location in 1993. That year, it also opened its 100th store.

In January 1998, the company closed 5 stores and cut 11% of its workforce due to declining profitability.

In November 1998, the chain was acquired by JC Penney, the parent company of Eckerd, for $432 million in stock and the assumption of $60 million in debt. At that time, the chain was headquartered in Melville, New York and had 141 stores with 5,000 employees. It was still almost entirely owned by the Genovese family.

Following the acquisition, the new owners planned to convert all Genovese locations to the Eckerd name within a year. However, the chain ultimately remained. By 2003, all Genovese stores were remodeled and rebranded as Eckerd.

Three years later, Eckerd was in turn purchased by Rite Aid and all locations were rebranded. In 2023, Rite Aid filed for Chapter 11 bankruptcy. Despite shutting down 20 years prior, Genovese Drug Stores was still listed in the filing.

On May 5, 2025, Rite Aid filed for Chapter 11 bankruptcy for the second time in 2 years, listing assets and liabilities between $1 billion and $10 billion. Rite Aid will sell all of its assets as part of its procedure, as it overcomes financial challenges such as debt, increased competition, and inflation, including Genovese Drug Stores.
