= Food-a-rama =

Supermarket chain based in Maryland, US

Food-A-Rama
- Type: Private
- Industry: Supermarket
- Founded: 1960
- Defunct: 1985
- Fate: Acquired by Super Rite Foods; later absorbed into Metro Food Markets and then Shoppers Food Warehouse
- Headquarters: Baltimore, Maryland, U.S.
- Number of locations: 48
- Area served: Maryland; Washington, D.C.
- Parent: Super Rite Foods (1985–1995); Richfood Holdings (1995–1999); SuperValu (1999–)

Food-A-Rama was a Baltimore, Maryland based-supermarket chain of 48 stores established in 1960. The stores were located in Maryland and Washington, DC. They consisted of Food-a-Rama, Super-Super, Cost-Saver Warehouse, and Basics Food Warehouse stores. When the company was sold in 1985 to Super Rite Foods of PA, it was the second-largest supermarket chain in Baltimore, behind Giant Food. After the sale, stores were bought and sold eventually changing all the store banners to Metro Food Markets. Super Rite and Basics/Metro Food Markets were acquired by Richfood Holdings in 1995. Richfood Holdings was sold to Supervalu Inc in 1999. Supervalu has since folded Metro Food Markets into the Shoppers Food Warehouse chain based in Lanham, MD.
