= Food Fair =

Supermarket chain in the United States until 2000

Pantry Pride

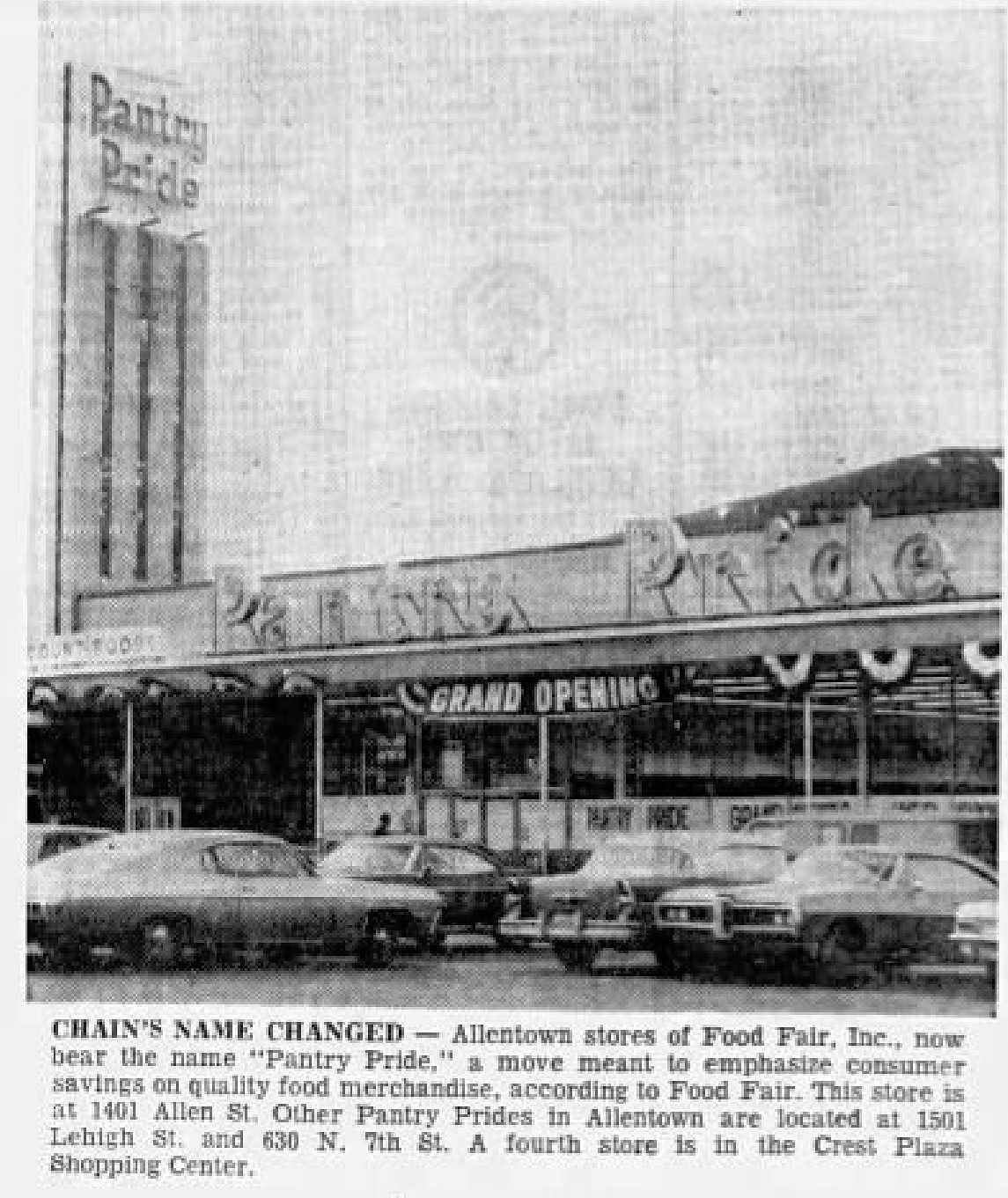
- A Pantry Pride supermarket in Allentown, Pennsylvania
- Formerly: Food Fair
- Industry: Grocery store
- Founded: 1920s in Harrisburg, Pennsylvania, United States
- Founders: Samuel N. Friedland and brother George I. Friedland
- Defunct: 2000; 26 years ago
- Number of locations: 275 (1957)

Food Fair, also known by its successor name Pantry Pride, was a large supermarket chain in the United States. It was founded by Samuel N. Friedland, and his brother George I. Friedland who opened the first store (as Reading Giant Quality Price Cutter) in Harrisburg, Pennsylvania, in the late 1920s. As of 1957, Food Fair had 275 stores, and at its peak, the chain had more than 500 stores. Friedland's family retained control of the firm through 1978, when the chain entered bankruptcy.

== History ==
=== Origins ===
Samuel Friedland and his brother George Friedland opened his first "Reading Giant Quality Price Cutter" supermarket in the 1920s. The success of the first store led to the opening of more stores. In the late 1940s came the introduction of the name Food Fair.

In 1958, Food Fair purchased Setzer's Supermarkets, a 38-store chain in the Jacksonville, Florida, area. In 1961, Food Fair bought J.M. Fields Department Stores, a chain of discount department stores in New England. The latter chain grew substantially, expanding to areas already served by Food Fair, particularly in Florida. By the 1960s, most J.M. Fields stores shopping centers featured a J.M. Fields, Food Fair, or Pantry Pride grocery store.

=== The birth of Pantry Pride ===
Final Food Fair logo, used from 1963.

During the 1960s, Food Fair enjoyed great success, but the most significant purchase for the company was that of a small Philadelphia chain called Best Markets. Best's private label brand was called Pantry Pride. The first Pantry Pride store opened its doors at 9:00 a.m. on August 26, 1964, in Hazlet, New Jersey, test-running a no-frills discount store approach. Soon, the stores that were under the "Pantry Pride" logo eventually became more popular than the "Food Fair" brand. By the early 1970s, Food Fair had converted most of its stores to the Pantry Pride banner, and the company popularity grew further.

=== Expansion in the 1960s and 1970s ===
In the late 1960s, the company, led by its Pantry Pride stores, continued to grow. The company also opened additional J.M. Fields stores and entered new businesses, launching drug stores, gasoline stations, and shoe stores. It also boosted its core business by entering California and Nevada through the purchase of the Fox Markets chain. The western expansion proved exhausting for the predominantly East Coast retailer, eventually divesting the 50 stores by 1972. In 1976, Pantry Pride acquired Hills Supermarkets of New York. Later that year, Pantry Pride purchased the remaining 17 stores of Philadelphia-based Penn Fruit Company.

=== Slow decline, 1978–2000 ===
In 1978, Food Fair fell victim to financial problems. The company entered bankruptcy that year and a new management team, led by supermarket veteran Grant Gentry, began streamlining the 456-store, $2.7 billion company. By the end of 1978 the company took the first steps in the long journey out of bankruptcy by closing all of the JM Fields stores. Those stores were quickly purchased by Caldor, Jefferson Ward, and Kmart. In early 1979, the company left their home market of Philadelphia, where the firm was headquartered. The company closed more than 50 stores in the area, even though they were the second-largest chain in greater Philadelphia in terms of market share. Between 1979 and 1981 more than 200 stores were closed, along with several warehouses. Food-a-Rama bought 14 of the 48 Baltimore-area stores in 1981. By this time, Food Fair had emerged from bankruptcy, and was based in Fort Lauderdale, Florida, under the name Pantry Pride Stores, Inc. The company had entered into talks to be purchased by the Supermarkets General Corporation (Pathmark Stores) that same year, but discussions were abandoned when Pantry Pride's stockholders filed a complaint. Pantry Pride outsourced their wholesale operations to Supervalu when they sold their Miami and Jacksonville distribution centers. The company then began selling off huge chunks of their assets when they sold two-thirds of their remaining stores, including the last of their Richmond, Virginia, stores to A&P, which continued to operate the stores under the Pantry Pride banner until 1986. Only about 40 stores in southern Florida remained.

In 1984, Pantry Pride acquired Devon Stores, a home improvement store, and the 400-store Adams Drug Company, which operated in the northeastern United States. The owner of Devon Stores, who obtained about 10.4% of the merged company, then sought an ouster of the Pantry Pride Board of Directors. In 1985, using junk bonds, 38% of Pantry Pride was acquired by investor Ronald Perelman. This was enough to acquire control, and Perelman liquidated their assets but kept the losses on the books to offset profits from MacAndrews and Forbes, which he had previously acquired. Perelman used Pantry Pride as a vehicle to acquire other companies, in particular Revlon. By 1986, the name of Pantry Pride was changed to Revlon Group. The Delaware Supreme Court decision relating to the takeover of Revlon by Pantry Pride, Revlon, Inc. v. MacAndrews & Forbes Holdings, Inc., has become a seminal case in American takeover law.

In 1985, the last stores in southern Florida were sold to Red Apple Group, a New York supermarket chain owned by John Catsimatidis. By 1990, the chain was being supplied by the Fleming Companies. The last store opened in 1991 in Sunny Isles, Florida. By this time, nearly all of the stores were renamed Woolley's, after Bill Woolley acquired the latter named chain of seven stores in the late 1980s. In 1993, Fleming bought the Woolley's chain after a dispute with Catsimatidis. The remaining stores were either closed or sold by 2000. Many of the stores that were sold have retained the "Food Fair" name under the new ownerships. An unrelated chain using the Food Fair Fresh Market name has operated in the New York City metropolitan area since 2009 and is a member of Key Food.

== Timeline ==
- 1920s - Food Fair Stores founded by Russian immigrant Samuel N. Friedland and brother George I. Friedland in Harrisburg, Pennsylvania.
- 1957 - Food Fair has 275 stores.
- 1958 - Food Fair purchases 40-store Jacksonville, Florida, based Setzer's Supermarkets.
- 1965 - Acquires J.M. Fields Department Stores. Also, the original ABC version of Supermarket Sweep debuts, taping at various Food Fair locations. Bill Malone hosted.
- mid-1960s - Acquires Best Markets and Pantry Pride private label brand, launches Pantry Pride branded discount supermarkets soon after
- 1967(?) - Purchases Fox Supermarkets in California and Nevada.
- 1972(?) - Divests Fox Supermarkets
- 1976 - Purchased Hills Supermarkets (NY)
- 1976 - Remaining 17 of bankrupt Penn Fruit's Philadelphia area stores are acquired by Food Fair.
- 1978 - Enters Chapter 11 Bankruptcy Protection. Friedland family gives up control of the company. Divests New Jersey Pantry Pride stores.
- 1981 - Exits Chapter 11 bankruptcy, re-organizes with new corporate name: Pantry Pride Stores, Inc., and moves company headquarters to Fort Lauderdale, FL.
- 1983-84 - Sells last two distribution centers to Supervalu, who in turn sold them to Malone and Hyde and Winn-Dixie.
- 1984 - Pantry Pride operates 122 supermarkets in Florida, southern Georgia, the Tidewater region of Virginia, and the Bahamas.
- 1984 - Purchases Rhode Island based Adams/Brooks Drug Stores (approx. 400 drug stores in the northeast, principally in New England).
- 1984 - Purchases Devon Stores Corp., a 61-store home center chain with locations near U.S. military bases. Sells Virginia division to A&P.
- 1985 - Acquires Revlon Corp. as a holding company in Ronald Perelman's hostile takeover bid.
- 1985 - Samuel Friedland died at age 88 in Miami Beach, FL.
- 1986 - With only a handful of stores (southern Florida), Pantry Pride sells its remaining stores to Gristedes Supermarkets (NY) chairman John Catsimatidis. Now out of the retail grocery business, the corporate name is changed to The Revlon Group, and moves corporate headquarters from Fort Lauderdale to New York.
- 1988 - Catsimatidis takes on Fleming Companies as a partner after Fleming purchases Malone & Hyde.
- 1991 - Last supermarket opened (Pantry Pride Food Emporium) in Sunny Isles, FL., most other stores are renamed Woolley's.
- 1993 - All remaining Pantry Pride/Woolley's Supermarkets are sold to Fleming.
