= Thomas J. Long =

American accountant and businessman

- Born: c. 1910; Covelo, California, U.S.
- Died: April 23, 1993 (aged 82); Walnut Creek, California, U.S.
- Education: University of California, Berkeley (BS)
- Occupation(s): Accountant and businessman
- Known for: Co-founder of Longs Drugs

Thomas J. Long (c. 1910 – 1993) was an American accountant and businessman who co-founded Longs Drugs with his brother Joseph.

== Early life and education ==
He was born in Covelo, California in 1910. He graduated from the University of California, Berkeley, where he earned a business degree in 1932. After graduating, he was hired as an accountant by a predecessor to Deloitte.

== Career ==
In the 1930s, Mr. Long borrowed $25,000 ($376,000 in 2018) to open a drug store with his younger brother, Joseph in Oakland. That store would become the first of a 274-store chain which in 1996 had annual sales of $2.5 billion in five states as of the time of his death.

The New York Times quotes retail experts as saying part of the Longs' success was "an ability to have each store cater to the needs of its community."

Thomas Long retired as the company's chairman in 1975, but he remained a director until his death.

He tried to avoid publicity and shunned extravagance, though he was reported to hold more than $70 million of the company's stock.

He was the chief donor to the Thomas J. Long Foundation. Part of his estate was donated to the University of California, Berkeley. The Thomas J. Long Business Library at the Haas School of Business bears his name. The Thomas J. Long School of Pharmacy and Health Sciences at the University of the Pacific is also named after him.

== Death ==
Long died at his home in Walnut Creek, California in 1993.
