= The Treasury (store) =

Defunct American corporation

The Treasury/Treasure Island
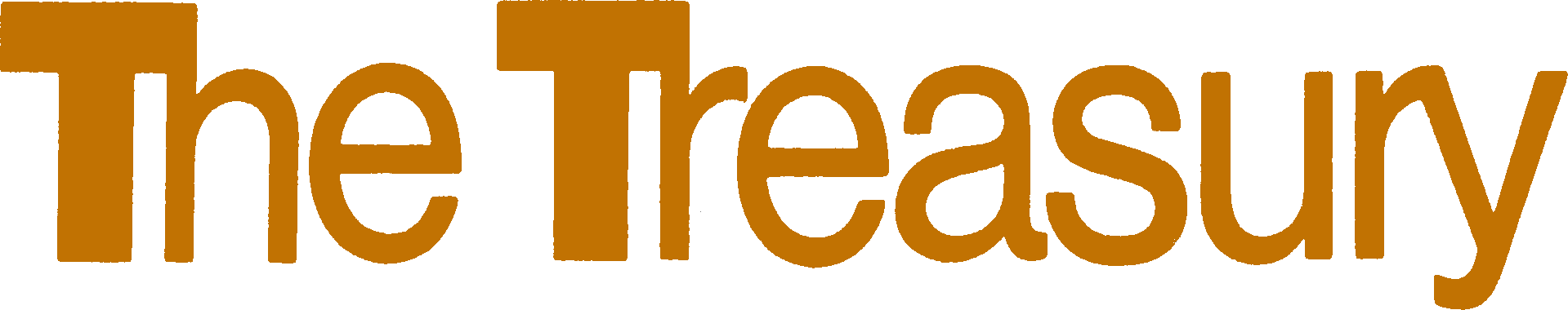
- Company type: Discount department store
- Industry: Retail
- Founded: November 24, 1961
- Defunct: 1981
- Fate: Bankruptcy
- Headquarters: Milwaukee, Wisconsin, United States
- Products: Clothing, footwear, bedding, furniture, jewelry, beauty products, electronics and housewares
- Parent: JCPenney

Treasure Island, formerly The Treasury, was a chain of discount stores and hypermarkets owned for most of its lifespan by JCPenney.

== Treasure Island/The Treasury History ==
=== Treasure Island ===
The General Merchandise Company was a mail order company founded by David Kritzik and his two sons, Robert and Stanley, in Milwaukee, Wisconsin in 1938. Treasure Island was founded as GMC's discount store division, with stores that measured 200,000 square feet and a conveyor belt that took purchased items outside to be placed in customers's cars. Its first location opened in Appleton, Wisconsin, on November 24, 1961.

The architecture of these stores, the work of Milwaukee architect Jordan A. Miller, was unique, having utilized a zig-zag pattern that was very prominent both inside and outside. Because of this, the store's merchandise was advertised as being "under the squiggly roof" well into the 1970s.

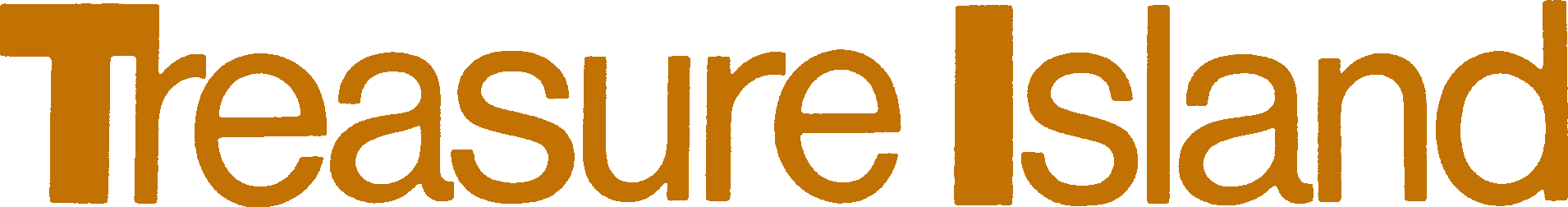
Treasure Island logo

In 1961, J.C. Penney was looking to break into the catalog business, and after failing to reach an agreement with Aldens in October, looked to acquire General Merchandise, who at the time was the country's fifth-largest catalog merchant. A merger proposal was agreed upon in December 1961, with GMC’s acquisition approved in February 1962 for $11 million.

The small chain, at this point only numbering five stores in Wisconsin, announced plans in March 1967 to enter the Atlanta, Georgia, market in its first expansion. Three stores in Forest Park, Doraville, and Marietta opened simultaneously on May 29, 1968, with a grand opening on July 31 coinciding with the completion of its grocery department.

=== The Treasury ===
The Treasure Island name was used into 1969, when it was announced in mid-May that the chain was to expand westward to Orange County, California. It was in July of the same year, however, while announcing an impending entry into the south Florida market that its new name, The Treasury, was divulged. This was, according to Jack F. Behrendt, then-vice president of the stores under J.C. Penney, to shift the chain's image and better express its personality. Stores in the Milwaukee and Atlanta markets, in which the Treasure Island name was already well established, were not renamed.

Despite having been announced before the name change, the first locations to use the Treasury name opened in Torrance, Buena Park, and Orange, California, on October 29, 1970. The two long-awaited south Florida stores opened in Hialeah and Hollywood on March 4, 1971, and three stores in the Memphis, Tennessee, area that had been announced in September 1969 were opened on July 29, 1971.

Some stores also sold food and fuel, like the Wal-Mart Supercenters of today. However, the recessions of the 1970s and early 1980s were too much to bear for J.C. Penney, and the discount division started losing money. The Treasury stores were eventually closed in 1981. However, the mail order business, which was the main reason for J.C. Penney's acquisition of Treasure Island, remained a thriving endeavor.

With the company struggling by 1979, it began to close stores and lease them to other tenants The Home Depot chain leased its first four stores in these former Treasure Island storefronts around the Atlanta area. The chain closed in 1982.

== Treasury Drug Centers ==
The company branched out into drug stores, located in many Southern states, as Treasury Drug Centers. In 1993, J.C. Penney sold 45 Atlanta-area stores to Big B Drugs for $16.5 billion. Treasury Drug survived until 1997, when J.C. Penney acquired Eckerd and converted remaining Treasury Drug locations into Eckerd stores.
