= Jean Coutu (pharmacist) =

Canadian pharmacist and businessman

Jean Coutu OC OQ
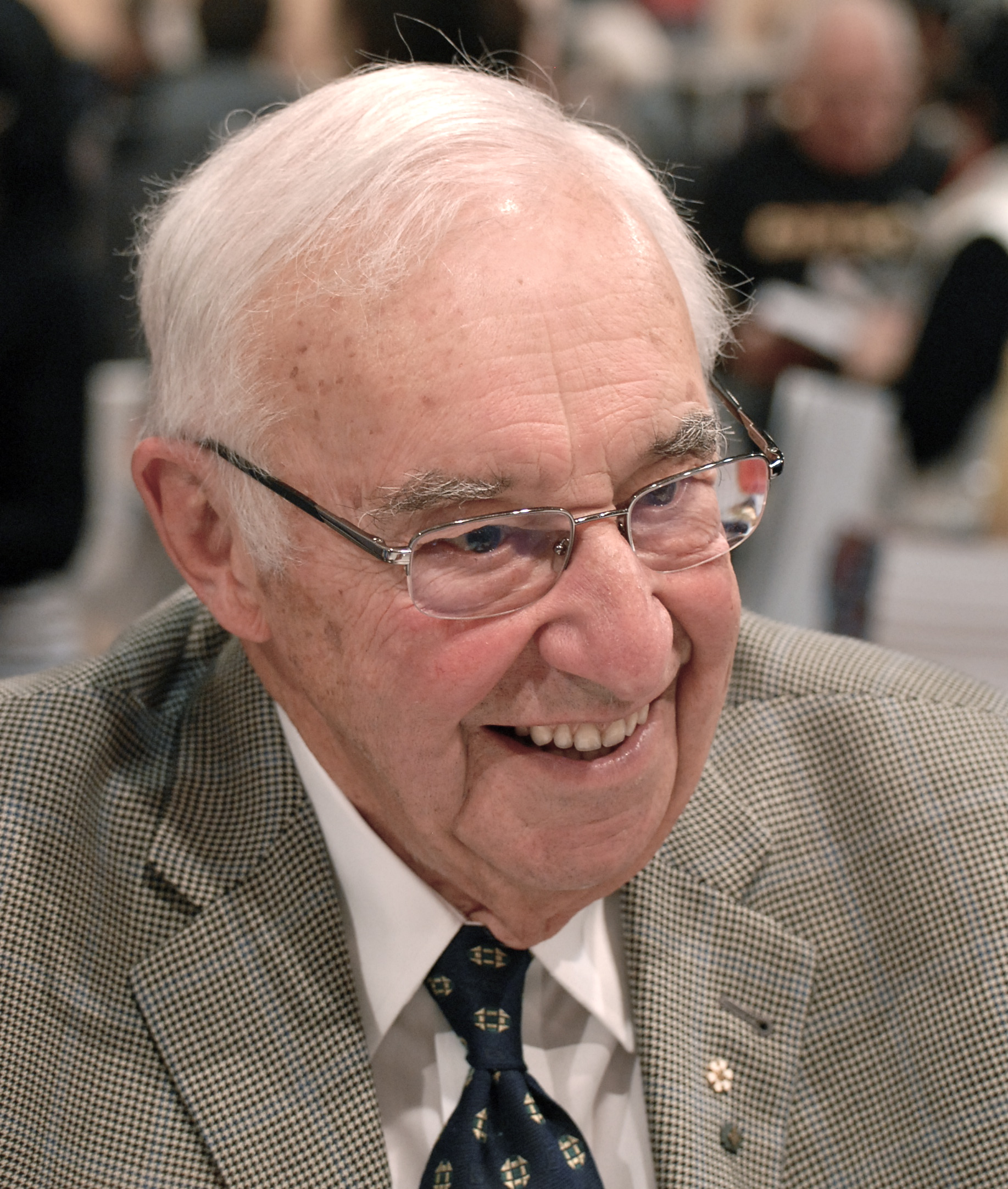
- Jean Coutu at the 2010 Montréal Book Fair
- Born: May 29, 1927 (age 99); Montreal, Quebec, Canada
- Education: McGill University; Université de Montréal
- Known for: Founder of the Jean Coutu Group
- Awards: Order of Canada; National Order of Quebec

Jean Coutu, OC OQ (born May 29, 1927) is a Canadian pharmacist and businessman. He is the founder and chairman of the Jean Coutu Group which he started in 1969. With an estimated net worth of $US 2.3 billion (as of 2015), Coutu was ranked by Forbes as the 22nd wealthiest Canadian and 938th wealthiest person in the world.

In 1993, he was made an Officer of the Order of Canada and an Officer of the National Order of Quebec.

== Philanthropy ==
Jean Coutu founded the Marcelle and Jean Coutu Foundation which mainly supports numerous causes such as poverty, women and child abuse, education, and the fight against drug addiction in Canada. It has contributed to multiple organizations, including:

- Autism research
- Centraide
- Fondation Le Pilier
- Mira
- Moisson Montréal
- SunYouth
- The Montreal Children's Hospital
