= Eckerd Corporation =

American pharmacy retail chain

- Type: Private (1898–1961); Public (1961–1997); Subsidiary (1997–2007); In-name-only (2007–present)
- Traded as: NYSE: ECK (1961–1997)
- Industry: Retail
- Founded: 1898; 128 years ago Erie, Pennsylvania, U.S.
- Defunct: 2007
- Fate: Acquired by Jean Coutu Group following the divestiture of 1,271 stores to CVS; Jean Coutu's U.S. division was divested to Rite Aid in 2007, and all ex-PJC stores, including Eckerd, were converted to Rite Aids; Eckerd Corporation itself remains an active in-name-only subsidiary of Rite Aid Corporation.
- Successor: CVS Pharmacy; Rite Aid
- Headquarters: Largo, Florida, U.S. (as Eckerd); Warwick, Rhode Island, U.S. (under Jean Coutu)
- Products: Pharmaceuticals; Cosmetics; Food; General merchandise
- Parent: JCPenney (1996–2004); Jean Coutu Group (2004–2007); Rite Aid (2007–2025)
- Website: eckerd.com (2006 archive)

Eckerd Corporation was an American pharmacy retail chain headquartered in Largo, Florida, and toward the end of its life, in Warwick, Rhode Island. At its peak, Eckerd was the second-largest pharmacy chain in the United States, with approximately 2,802 stores in 23 states as far west as Arizona.

An independent chain for most of its existence, Eckerd was purchased by JCPenney in 1996. Following years of losses and failed attempts to turn around the company, the chain was divided in 2004, with 1,271 of its stores, and its mail-order business, sold to competitor CVS, and the remainder acquired by Jean Coutu Group through its U.S. division. Jean Coutu sold the chain to Rite Aid in 2007, and its name was phased out soon thereafter and replaced with the Rite Aid name. After Rite Aid's subsequent 2025 bankruptcy and liquidation, all or most of Eckerd's final retail footprint at dissolution became absorbed by CVS, anyway.

== History ==
Eckerd was founded in September 1898, by 27-year-old Joseph Milton Eckerd and Z. Tatom in Erie, Pennsylvania. In the company's early years, it operated at 1105 State Street in downtown Erie as the Erie Cut-Rate Medicine Store, focusing on cheaper prices than the competition. In 1912, Eckerd and Tatom sold their original store to Eckerd's sons and moved to Wilmington, Delaware, establishing a new store. From Delaware, the chain expanded to New York, North Carolina, and later Florida.

Jack Eckerd, son of the founder, purchased several of his father's stores in Delaware and New York during the 1940s. In 1947, Eckerd traveled to California to visit stores that had converted to "self-service" format akin to supermarkets. He brought the method back east with him in order to improve his business. He then acquired three stores in Tampa Bay, Florida in 1952. After five years, he sold his interests in Delaware and moved to Clearwater. Then, in 1959, Eckerd went public. It also inked a deal with Publix to open locations next to the grocery store.

Looking to diversify its assets, the company purchased Jackson Byrons department store. By 1971, the company had filled its 50-millionth prescription. In 1973, the company entered the prescription eyeglass market with 12 Eckerd Optical Center units. Within two years, it had more than 50 centers. Following several political campaigns and a stint with the Government Services Administration under president Gerald Ford, Jack Eckerd took a less active role in the business.

In 1977, Eckerd Drug Corp. merged with Eckerd Drug of North Carolina, which had been founded by Jack Eckerd's brother-in-law, Ed O'Herron, Sr. It made Eckerd the second largest drugstore chain in the country. By 1978, sales topped $1 billion. The company also purchased Brooks Fashion Stores, a chain of 282 women's junior apparel specialty stores, in 1979. In 1981, Eckerd purchased American Home Video Corp., a Denver-based electronics chain.

However, the company's diversification efforts stretched resources thin. In 1982, profits fell for the first time. By this point, competitors began pushing in and Eckerd was slow to modernize its ordering system. By the mid-1980s, Eckerd began selling off its ancillary businesses, including Eckerd's Apparel and J. Byrons department stores, as well as VideoConcepts. Now considered a takeover target after Dart Group acquired 5% of the company, Eckerd negotiated a leveraged buyout with Merrill Lynch Capital Partners in 1986. John Eckerd sold his stock and resigned as the company’s CEO.

Refocused on its pharmacy business, Eckerd bought 35 Shoppers Drug Mart stores located in South Florida in 1989. It also acquired Insta-Care Pharmacy Services, a prescription drug delivery service that year. Then, in 1990, Eckerd purchased 220 Revco locations across Texas, Florida, Mississippi, Louisiana, and Oklahoma in 1990. It also attempted a $1 billion takeover of Revco while it was in bankruptcy in 1992. In an effort to consolidate its operations and cut costs, Eckerd acquired a distribution center in Orlando in 1993. The company's existing distribution centers in Orlando and Largo were closed. In 1994, the company sold off its optical business, including 47 Visionworks stores and 29 Eckerd Optical Centers, as well as Insta-Care Pharmacy Services. Later that year, Eckerd went public once again. In 1995, the company bought 109 drug stores in Florida for $75 million from Rite Aid.

=== JCPenney era ===
In November 1996, JCPenney agreed to acquire Eckerd's 1,724 stores. The merger took place in 1997. The company was also ordered to sell 161 drugstores in North and South Carolina to settle antitrust charges. Penney paid $3.3-billion and assumed $760 million in debt to acquire Eckerd, and combined it with its 800-store Thrift Drug chain. Thrift Drug, Kerr Drug, Fay's Drugs, and Treasury Drug were then rebranded to the Eckerd name. JCPenney catalog counters were added to Eckerd stores.

JCPenney also bought more than 500 additional stores from four other chains in New York, Virginia, and the Carolinas, including the 1998 acquisition of the 141-store Genovese chain in the New York metropolitan area. These stores were renamed to Eckerd in 2003.

In 2000, JCPenney closed 289 Eckerd stores as part of an effort to turn the company around.

During this period, Eckerd became the second largest drug store chain in the U.S., with over 2,800 stores stretching from New York and Connecticut to Florida and west to Arizona.

After seven years of owning Eckerd, JCPenney came to see the chain as a distraction which would cost too much to continue fixing (as they were focused on their department stores), and in March 2004 it formally declared that it would carry Eckerd on its books as a discontinued asset. JCPenney took a $1.3-billion charge against earnings in connection with selling the drugstore chain, which had accounted for 45 percent of its annual revenues.

=== Sale to CVS and Jean Coutu ===
In July 2004, JCPenney sold the Eckerd chain to CVS Corporation and Jean Coutu Group for a total of $4.5 billion (~$7.34 billion in 2025). CVS acquired 1,271 Eckerd stores, and support facilities, in Florida, Texas, and other Southern states, as well as Eckerd's pharmacy benefits management and mail order businesses, for $2.15 billion. Jean Coutu Group, which also operated Brooks Pharmacy in New England at the time, acquired the remaining 1,540 stores, and support facilities, in the Northeast and mid-Atlantic (essentially everything from Georgia northward) for $2.375 billion. Eckerd's distribution center at RIDC O'Hara near Pittsburgh and 78 individual stores were closed in 2005.

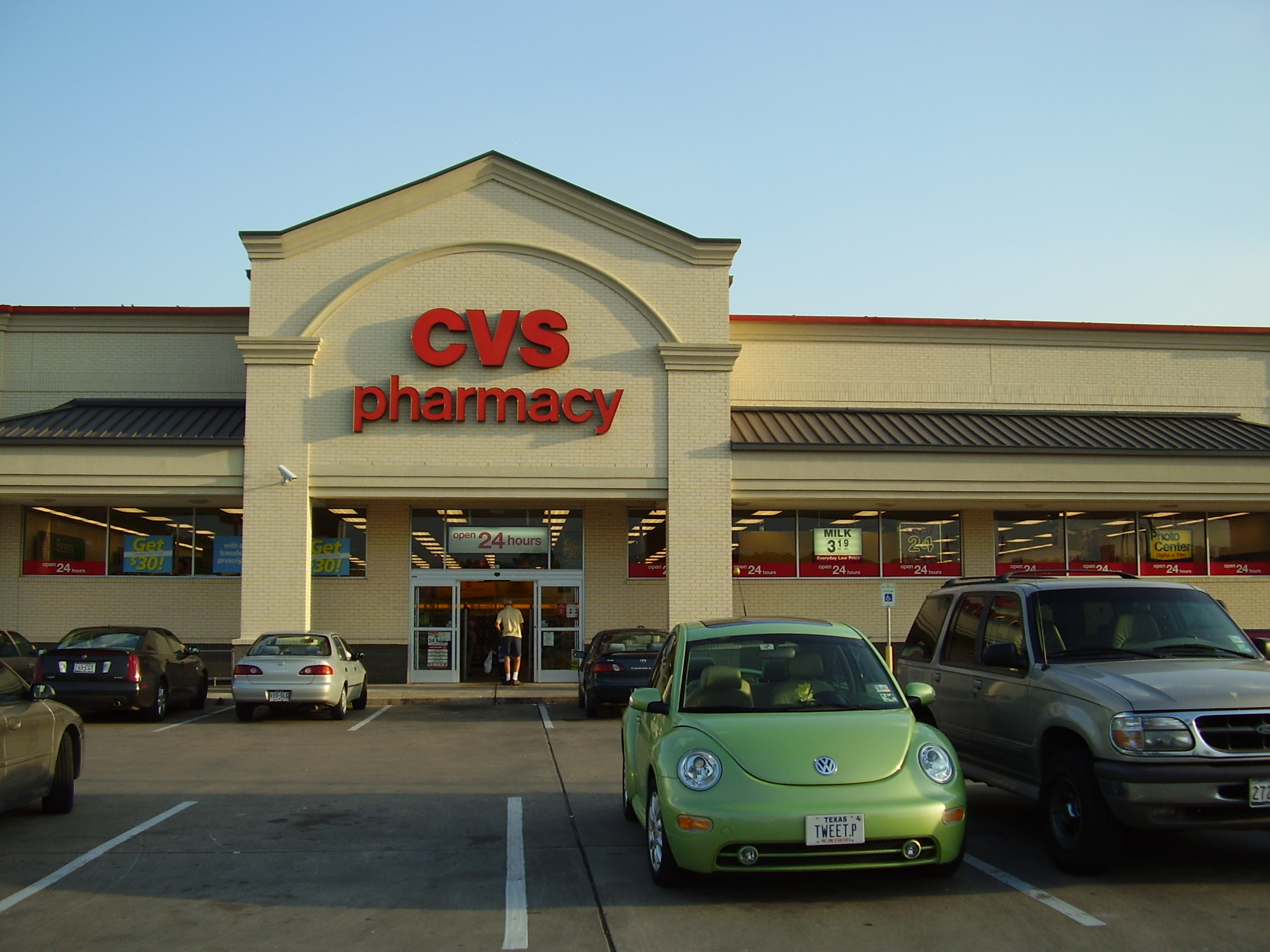
A CVS Pharmacy in Southside Place, Texas, which was formerly an Eckerd store

The locations acquired by CVS were converted to CVS Pharmacies in late 2004 and 2005, eliminating the Eckerd name from markets such as Florida, Texas, Oklahoma, Louisiana, and Mississippi, which were historically the chain's strongholds. Even a few brand-new locations in Florida, Texas and Arizona were transformed into CVS almost as quickly as they were built as Eckerd stores. Over 200 stores, and a distribution center in Garland, Texas, were closed. The CVS purchase also included the Eckerd stores located in Colorado; however, CVS opted to close these stores. As a condition of the sale, CVS accepted JCPenney's store credit card until July 2014.

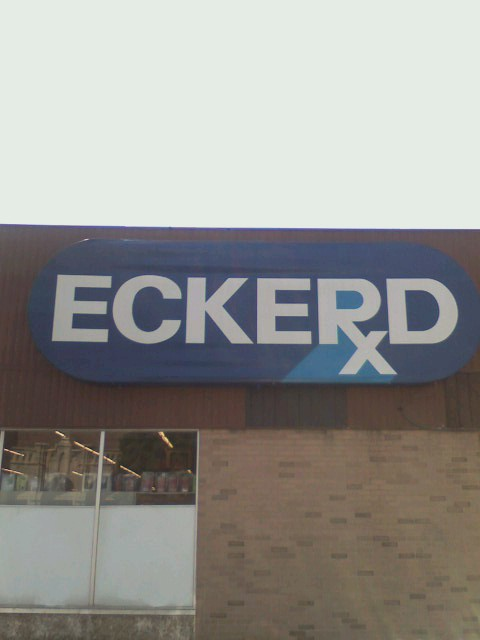
An Eckerd Drugs location in upstate New York

Jean Coutu operated its pharmacies under the Eckerd and Brooks stores, but many of the corporate functions were merged under Brooks-Eckerd, including the use of Brooks' corporate headquarters in Warwick, Rhode Island. Jean Coutu operated the stores it purchased under the slightly modified "Eckerd Pharmacy" name and logo, featuring a red Eckerd capsule in an attempt to unify the Eckerd and Brooks chains.

=== Acquisition by Rite Aid ===
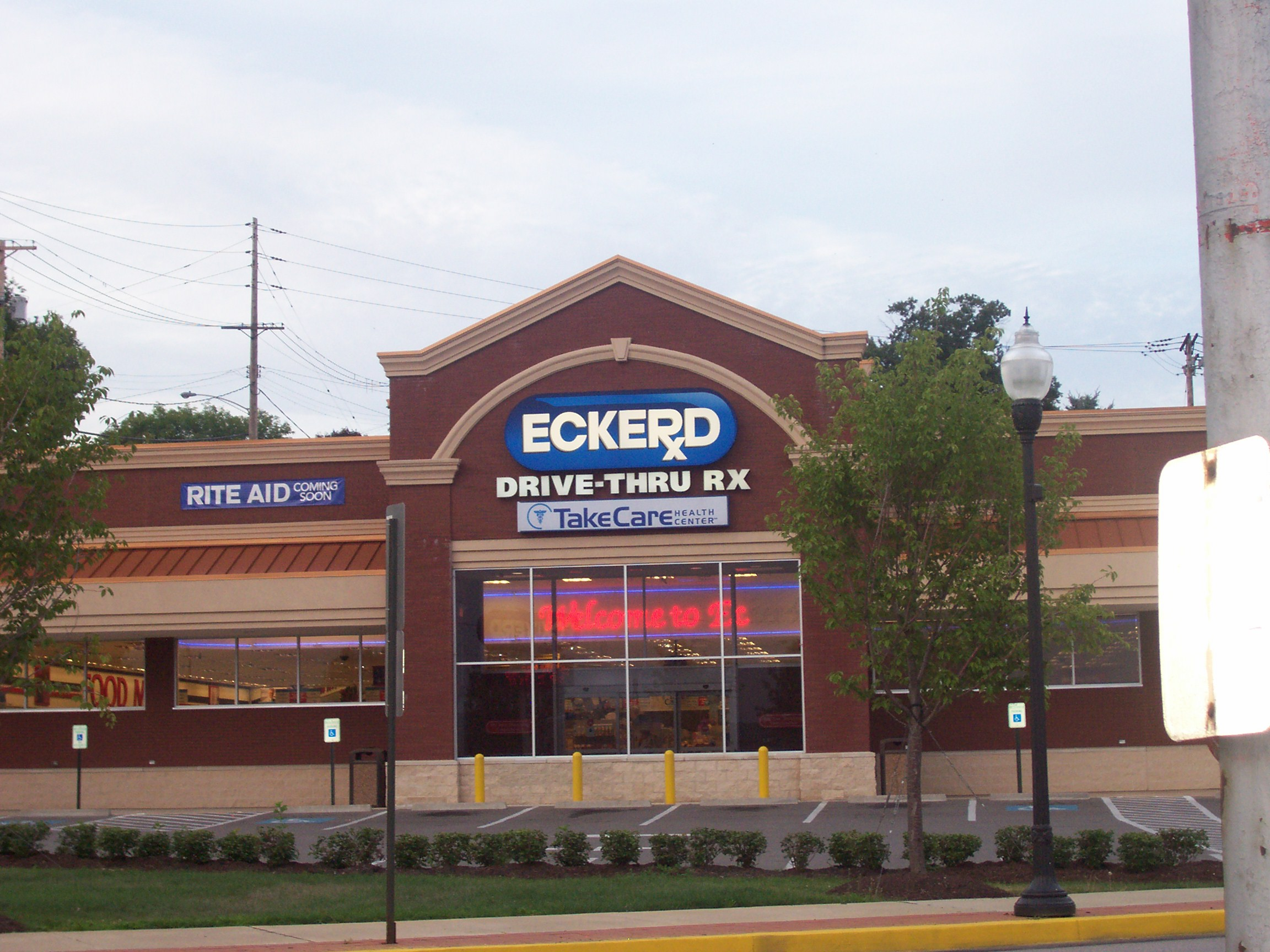
An Eckerd Pharmacy in Rochester, Pennsylvania, pictured shortly before its conversion into a Rite Aid in August 2007. This location closed in October 2023.

In August 2006, it was announced that Rite Aid would acquire 1,858 Eckerd Pharmacy and Brooks Pharmacy stores from Jean Coutu for $2.4 billion. Jean Coutu would also own 30% of Rite Aide. The deal closed on June 4, 2007. Rite Aid announced that the two chains would be converted to the Rite Aid name, retiring the 109-year-old Eckerd banner. All remaining Eckerd stores were converted to Rite Aid and remodeled by the following year. In 2009, Eckerd's distribution centers in Newnan, Georgia and Bohemia, New York were closed.

In 2023, Rite Aid filed for Chapter 11 bankruptcy amid several opioid lawsuits and declining sales. Eckerd Corporation, along with the former U.S. subsidiary of Jean Coutu, had remained active in-name-only subsidiaries of Rite Aid, as shown in the company's bankruptcy filings.

On May 5, 2025, Rite Aid filed for Chapter 11 bankruptcy for the second time in 2 years, listing assets and liabilities between $1 billion and $10 billion. Rite Aid will sell all of its assets as part of its procedure, as it overcomes financial challenges such as debt, increased competition, and inflation, including Eckerd.

== Slogans ==
- You'll like what we'll do for you!
- America's family drugstore
- It's right at Eckerd! (1996-1998)
- That's the reason there's Eckerd: because America can't wait!
- Right there with you (1998–2001)
- Get more! (2001–2007)

== See also ==
- Thrift Drug
