= Revco =

Defunct American pharmacy chain

Revco, D.S., Inc.
- Industry: Pharmacy
- Founded: August 24, 1956; 69 years ago
- Defunct: 1997
- Fate: Acquired by CVS
- Headquarters: Twinsburg, Ohio
- Products: Pharmacy, Cosmetics, Health and Beauty Aids, General Merchandise, Snacks, 1 Hour Photo
- Website: Revco.com (1997 archive)

Revco Discount Drug Stores (known simply as Revco or Revco, D.S.), once based in Twinsburg, Ohio, was a major drug store chain operating through the Ohio Valley, the Mid-Atlantic states, and the Southeastern United States. The chain's stock was traded on the New York Stock Exchange under the ticker symbol RXR. Revco was sold to CVS Pharmacy for $2.8 billion ($5.07 billion in 2024) in February 1997. When it was sold, the chain had over 2,500 stores.

== History ==
Revco, originally known as Registered Vitamin Company, was founded in 1956 in Detroit, Michigan, by Sidney Dworkin and Bernie Shulman. Dworkin led Revco until 1986 as CEO, and then he served as chairman until 1987.

Up to 1983, Revco grew tremendously; the chain had over 2,200 stores and over $2.2 billion ($5.81 billion in 2024) in sales. The chain then began to stumble. In 1983, its vitamins were blamed for the deaths of a number of premature infants. In order to prevent a hostile takeover and increase short-term profitability, Dworkin then led the chain into a deal that would seal its fate many years later. Under his leadership, Revco purchased a company called Odd Lot Trading Co., a closeout retailer based in New Jersey. Revco's management lost its focus on the drug store portion of its business due to problems with Odd Lot Trading Co., and earnings tumbled. The chain also began to merchandise items such as televisions, furniture, and other non-core items, and the heavy investment proved to be a failure.

=== Bankruptcy ===
In 1986, Revco was the target of a leveraged buyout. Part of the buyout deal was to reduce costs by closing stores and by reducing inventory to repay debts. This left the company with a shortfall of cash, and suppliers stopped shipping inventory, causing the chain to lose customers. This eventually caused the chain to file for bankruptcy in 1988. Revco was bailed out of bankruptcy by investor Sam Zell, in part to fend off separate takeover attempts by both Eckerd and Rite Aid. In 1990, 221 Midwest Revco stores were purchased by Reliable Drug, based in Cleveland, Ohio. The Michigan stores purchased by Reliable were sold almost immediately to Perry Drugs. Revco emerged from bankruptcy, as an independent company, in 1992.

==== Emergence from bankruptcy ====
Revco's turnaround from bankruptcy was and is often still considered the "model" of a business recovering from bankruptcy. The chain closed many underperforming stores (including selling all stores west of the Mississippi River to the son of the then-current Rite Aid CEO), reduced costs, introduced computerized point-of-sale systems, and introduced a new store design to help increase sales. The chain shrank from about 2,200 stores to about 1,500 stores during this period.

The hallmark of the new store designs was the arrangement of the store aisles, which was developed and introduced as the company was emerging from bankruptcy. Half the store had aisles that ran from the front of the store to the back in straight rows. Seasonal merchandise, food, greeting cards, baby supplies, hardware and office supplies were in this half of the store. The other half of the store, the health and beauty sections, had their aisles slanted so customers could see down the aisles as they walked from the front doors to the pharmacy, which was in the back of the store. A very wide main aisle led from the front door to the pharmacy, and this aisle separated the slanted aisles from the "straight aisles". While many drug stores in the U.S. have variations of this design today, it was a departure at the time from the usual all front-to-back, straight aisles. In Revco's free standing stores, the slanted aisles had an open ceiling above them; the other aisles had a drop ceiling over them. In these stores today, which are now CVS stores, the open ceiling and drop ceiling are still in place (though all the aisles are now aligned in a traditional manner).

The new stores also were decorated in soft blues and greys, had track lighting, and low hanging lights over the greeting cards, all which gave the store a "soft" appearance. Revco introduced strict rules about having no handwritten signs or merchandise displays sitting directly on the floor, which it thought gave the stores a cleaner look. All front-end employees had to wear a navy blue smock.

After emerging from bankruptcy, the chain grew tremendously again, increasing its store count to over 2,500 stores. Part of this growth came from the purchase of over 800 Hook's/SupeRx drug stores in 1994 in the Mid-Atlantic region and Midwest, and Birmingham, Alabama, based Big B Drugs in the southeast, which was its last purchase, made in 1996.

=== Sale of the company ===
In order to help Zell recover his investment in the company, the company's management was under pressure to sell the company. In 1996, Revco entered into an agreement with Rite Aid to be bought out. The Federal Trade Commission (FTC) announced that it would sue to stop the buyout, saying that Rite Aid would become a monopoly in many markets because Rite Aid and Revco had many overlapping stores, and Rite Aid withdrew its bid for the company.

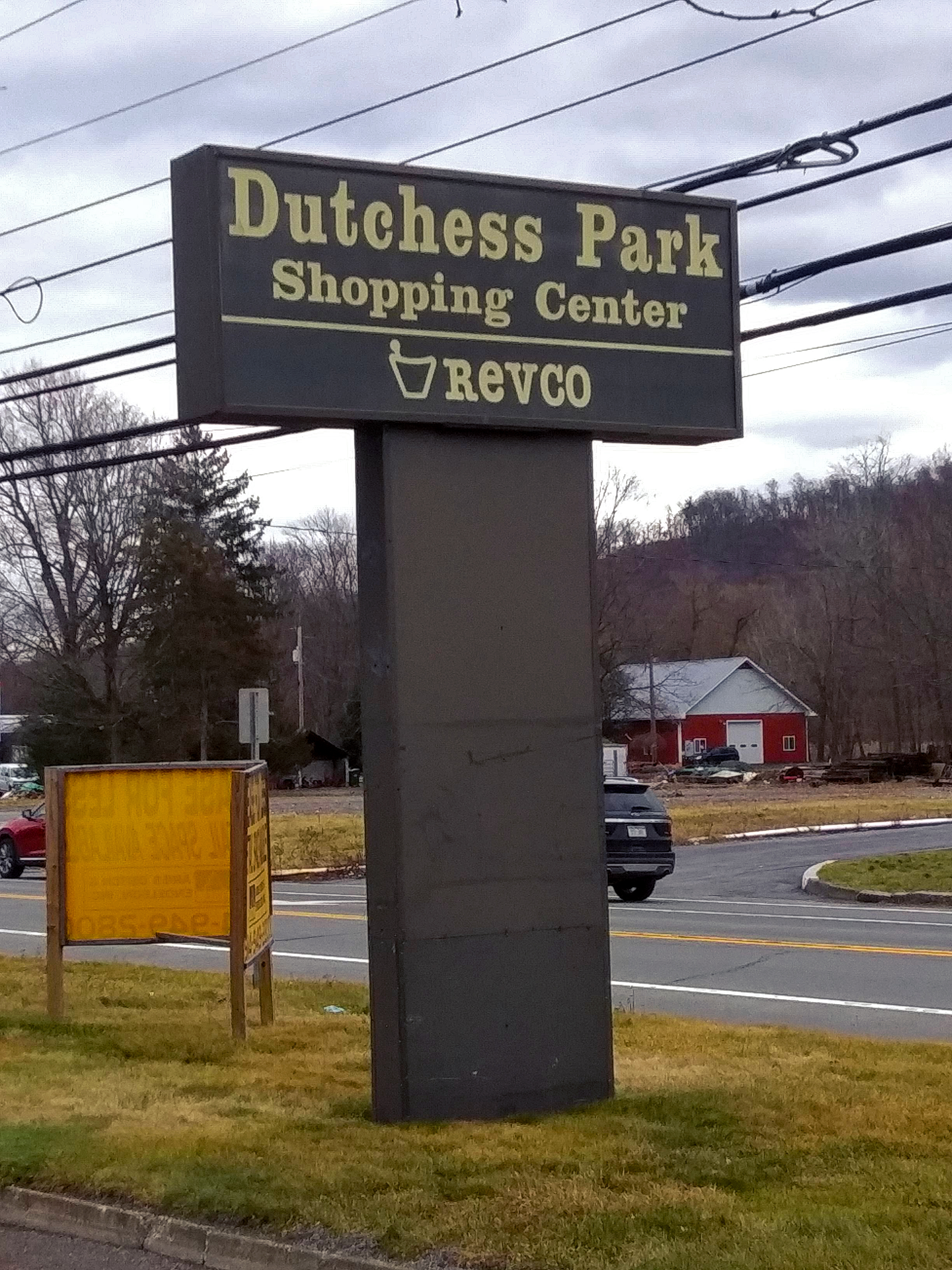
Sign with lingering Revco logo at shopping center near Fishkill, NY, in 2023

In February 1997, CVS Pharmacy entered into an agreement to acquire Revco, but the FTC moved to block the acquisition under the Clayton Act on the ground that it would substantially reduce competition in two markets: the state of Virginia and the Binghamton, New York metropolitan statistical area. In response, CVS and Revco agreed that 114 of Revco's Virginia stores and six of its Binghamton-area stores would be divested. The companies entered into a consent order with the agency, under which it was agreed that the Virginia-area stores would be divested to Eckerd Corporation and the Binghamton stores would be divested to Medicine Shoppe, Inc. As part of executing the divestiture to Eckerd, the FTC alleged that CVS removed important computers and pharmacy files from the divested stores, and that CVS denied Eckerd access to Revco's computerized patient profile data, providing the data only on microfiche, which would require Eckerd to manually re-enter the data, impairing Eckerd's ability to compete. CVS was fined $600,000 for the violation. Apart from the FTC penalty, CVS paid a $1.58 million fine to the Virginia Board of Pharmacy for violating state regulations governing the transfer of patient prescription records.

=== CEOs ===
- Sidney Dworkin (1961–1986)
- William Edwards (1986–1987)
- Boake Sells (1987–1992)
- D. Dwayne Hoven (1992–1997, last CEO)

== Promotions and discount programs ==
Revco was well known for the slogan "You need all the Revco you can get!", its "A Friend for Life" slogan, and its senior citizen's discount program, called "Senior Shoppers" (in which customers over 65 received 10% off their purchase every Wednesday). Revco also had a discount program for customers with disabilities (called "Helping Hands") and for baby supplies (called "Baby Bunch").

At the time, it was highly unusual for a chain of Revco's size to offer such discount programs, and the chain was extremely popular with customers because of these programs. Revco may have been well ahead of its time, as its discount programs resembled today's loyalty card programs used by grocery stores and CVS. Revco had customers fill out an information card with their contact information and gave them a card to identify their participation in the discount program (though Revco did not track purchases as many loyalty card programs do today).

Revco used gymnast Mary Lou Retton as an advertising spokesperson in the 1990s, who often began commercials by saying, "And another thing..." and would end them by saying, "...and now you know. Revco."

Rite Aid now offers a similar discount program to "Senior Shoppers", called "Living More". This may be because Rite-Aid's James P. Mastrian, who is the Executive Vice President of Marketing, held the same position at Revco from 1994 to 1997.

Twins Days, a festival honoring the twin brothers who founded the city of Twinsburg, was the brainchild of Charles R. DeHaven, then Revco's Assistant Vice President of Public Relations. DeHaven planned a number of promotional events in 1976 to commemorate the nation's bicentennial. From the small gathering of 37 sets of twins that first year, the festival now attracts thousands from all over the world and makes national headlines every summer.

=== Prescription Access Link ===
Revco was one of the first drug store chains in the country to have a centralized pharmacy computer system, which it called Prescription Access Link (PAL). This system allowed each Revco access to any other Revco's prescription information. It highly advertised this system to customers, which allowed a customer to go any Revco to have their prescription refilled without the stores having to call each other on the phone. While this type of system is the norm in drug stores today, it was revolutionary when Revco used it. PAL was introduced to Revco stores during its emergence from bankruptcy.

== In popular culture ==
=== The Revco Marathon ===
Revco founded and sponsored a marathon in Cleveland, which was often referred to among runners as "The Revco" (its full name was "The Revco Cleveland Marathon and 10K"). The first race took place in 1976, when jogging/running first became a national fitness craze. Famous Olympic athlete Jesse Owens fired the starting gun at the first race, which started at Western Reserve Academy in Hudson, Ohio, wound its way up Rt. 91 north through Twinsburg and Solon, and eventually ended in Cleveland. This particularly grueling course was changed in later years to begin and end at Cleveland State University. Many famous runners participated over the years, as "The Revco" became an Olympic qualifying event. After CVS bought Revco, the race became known as the "CVS Marathon and 10K" before CVS dropped its sponsorship in the early 2000s. The race was sponsored by Rite Aid until 2021, when Union Home Mortgage became the primary sponsor.
