= Jean Coutu Group =

Canadian drugstore chain

Jean Coutu Group Inc.
- Type: Subsidiary
- Traded as: TSX: PJC.A:APH
- Industry: Retail
- Founded: 1969; 57 years ago
- Headquarters: Varennes, Quebec, Canada
- Key people: Jean Coutu
- Products: Pharmacy
- Revenue: ▲$2977.9 million (2017)
- Number of employees: 20 000 (2016)
- Parent: Metro Inc. (2018–present)
- Website: www.jeancoutu.com

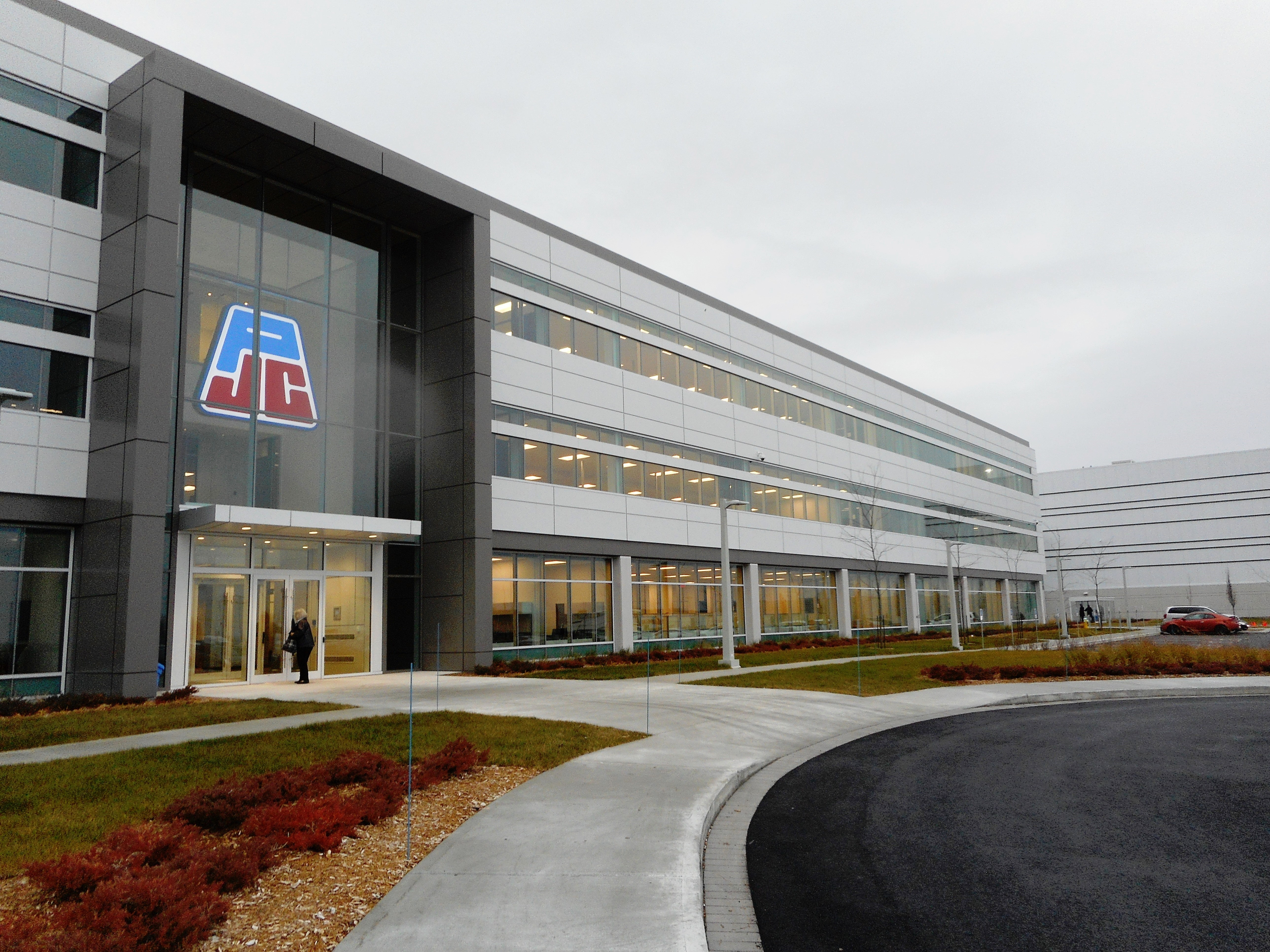
The headquarters of Jean Coutu Group in Varennes, Quebec.

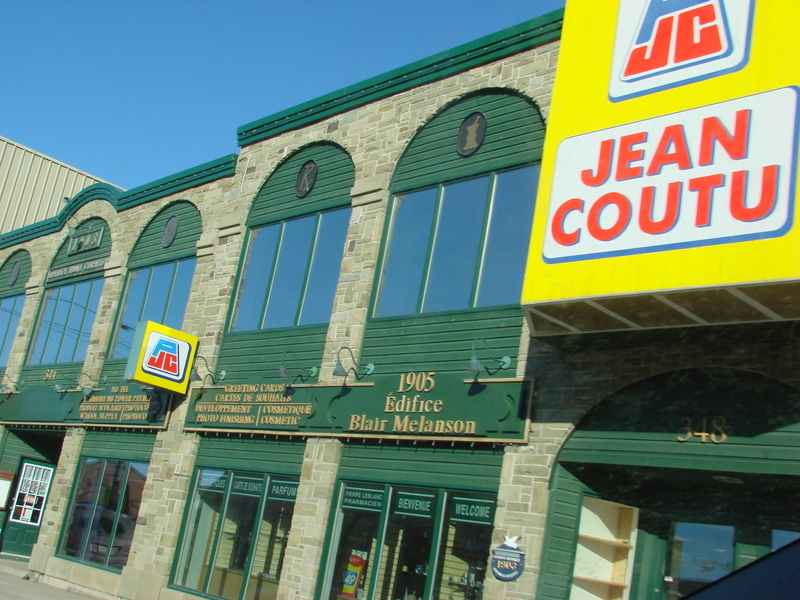
A Jean Coutu pharmacy in Shediac, New Brunswick.

The Jean Coutu Group (PJC) Inc. is a Canadian pharmacy chain based in Varennes, Quebec. The company operates over 400 franchised locations across Quebec, Ontario, and New Brunswick under the banners PJC Jean Coutu, PJC Clinique, and PJC Santé. At its peak, it was the third-largest distributor and retailer of pharmaceuticals and related products in North America, managing nearly 2,200 drugstores.

The company formerly operated in the United States through its subsidiary, The Jean Coutu Group (PJC) USA, Inc., under the Brooks Pharmacy and Eckerd Drugs brands. These U.S. operations were sold to Rite Aid in 2007. Although the subsidiary remains legally active under Rite Aid, all its stores have since been rebranded.

The company is known for its private label "Personnelle", which includes products such as cosmetics, paper goods, and pharmaceutical items. Since 2016, the company's main distribution warehouse is based in Varennes, Quebec, taking over from its previous facility in Longueuil, which was used from 1976 to 2015. The company also oversees a warehouse in Hawkesbury, Ontario, which has been operating since 2005. (Note: While Jean Coutu oversees the Hawkesbury distribution centre, the employees employed there currently work for DB Ontario inc.)

== History ==
The company was founded in 1969 by Jean Coutu and Louis Michaud as a pharmacy in the east end of Montreal under the name Pharm-Escomptes Jean Coutu.

The company was incorporated in 1973 under the name Services Farmico, at which point it had set up five branches in Montreal. It entered the New Brunswick market in 1982 and the Ontario market in 1983. In 1986, the company changed its name to the Jean Coutu Group (PJC) Inc., and became a publicly listed company. The company uses the listing PJC.A.TO. on the Toronto Stock Exchange.

From 1987, the company completed a series of acquisitions of pharmacies under various brands, including Cadieux, Cloutier Pharmacy, Douglas Drug Inc., Brooks Drug Store, Rite Aid Mayrand, and Cumberland.

In 1999, the company was the first in Canada to offer an online service allowing customers to refill their prescriptions. In 2000, they began offering a similar service over the telephone.

The company has earned titles including "Canada's Most Respected Corporations", and "The Most Admired Company in Quebec", winning the latter seven times.

The company generates most of its revenue in Quebec, where the majority of its franchises are located, however they also generate revenue in the United States as well. The company's competitors include Loblaws, Shoppers Drug Mart, Wal-Mart, Familiprix, Brunet, and Uniprix.

In May 2013, Jean Coutu announced that it would move its head office from Longueuil to Varennes, as the Longeuil office was too small. The new office, and an adjacent distribution centre, opened between 2015 and 2016.

In September 2017, Jean Coutu announced it was in talks to be acquired by Metro Inc., a Canadian supermarket chain, for approximately C$4.50bn. The deal closed in May 2018.

=== Jean Coutu Group USA ===
The Jean Coutu Group (PJC) USA, Inc.
- Type: Subsidiary (until 2007); In-name-only (2007–present)
- Industry: Retail
- Defunct: 2007; 19 years ago (operations)
- Fate: Divested to Rite Aid in 2007; still remains active as an in-name-only subsidiary
- Successor: Rite Aid
- Headquarters: Philadelphia, Pennsylvania, U.S.
- Parent: Jean Coutu Group (until 2007); Rite Aid (2007–present)

Jean Coutu Group (PJC) USA, Inc. was Jean Coutu's U.S. subsidiary, based in Warwick, Rhode Island. It operated primarily along the east coast, under the Brooks Pharmacy banner in New England and as Eckerd Pharmacy from Upstate New York and Pennsylvania south to Georgia.

Jean Coutu purchased Brooks in 1994 from the now-defunct Revco drug chain. Revco had acquired Brooks a few months earlier as part of its acquisition of Hook's-SupeRx, Inc.

In mid-2004, Jean Coutu acquired more than half of the Eckerd store network, mainly consisting of units along the eastern seaboard, from department store retailer J.C. Penney. The company continued to operate those stores under the Eckerd name.

From 1999 to 2004 the chain was the second fastest-growing retailer in the world. In the second quarter of 2005, the company recorded a $19.7 million US foreign exchange loss on items related to the Eckerd acquisition.

On August 24, 2006, Rite Aid announced that it would acquire Jean Coutu's U.S. operations for $1.45 billion in cash and issuing stock, giving Jean Coutu a 32% equity stake in Rite Aid. Rite Aid announced the acquisition completed on June 4, 2007. After the transaction, the pharmacies were rebranded as Rite Aids, but the Jean Coutu subsidiary remained active as an in-name only subsidiary of Rite Aid Corporation.

In July 2013, Jean Coutu sold the last of its shares in Rite Aid, since which the company no longer holds any shares in Rite Aid.

In 2023, Rite Aid filed for Chapter 11 bankruptcy. Despite Jean Coutu being separated from Rite Aid 10 years prior, Jean Coutu was still listed in the filing.

On May 5, 2025, Rite Aid filed for Chapter 11 bankruptcy again, listing assets and liabilities between $1 billion and $10 billion. Rite Aid intended to sell assets as part of its bankruptcy, including Jean Coutu USA.

=== Controversies ===
In August 2022, a Quebec pharmacist refused to sell a customer emergency contraceptive pills because it went against his religious beliefs.

== Main competitors ==
- Shoppers Drug Mart (Pharmaprix in Quebec)
- Familiprix
- Uniprix
- Proxim
