= Heyward Donigan =

American business executive

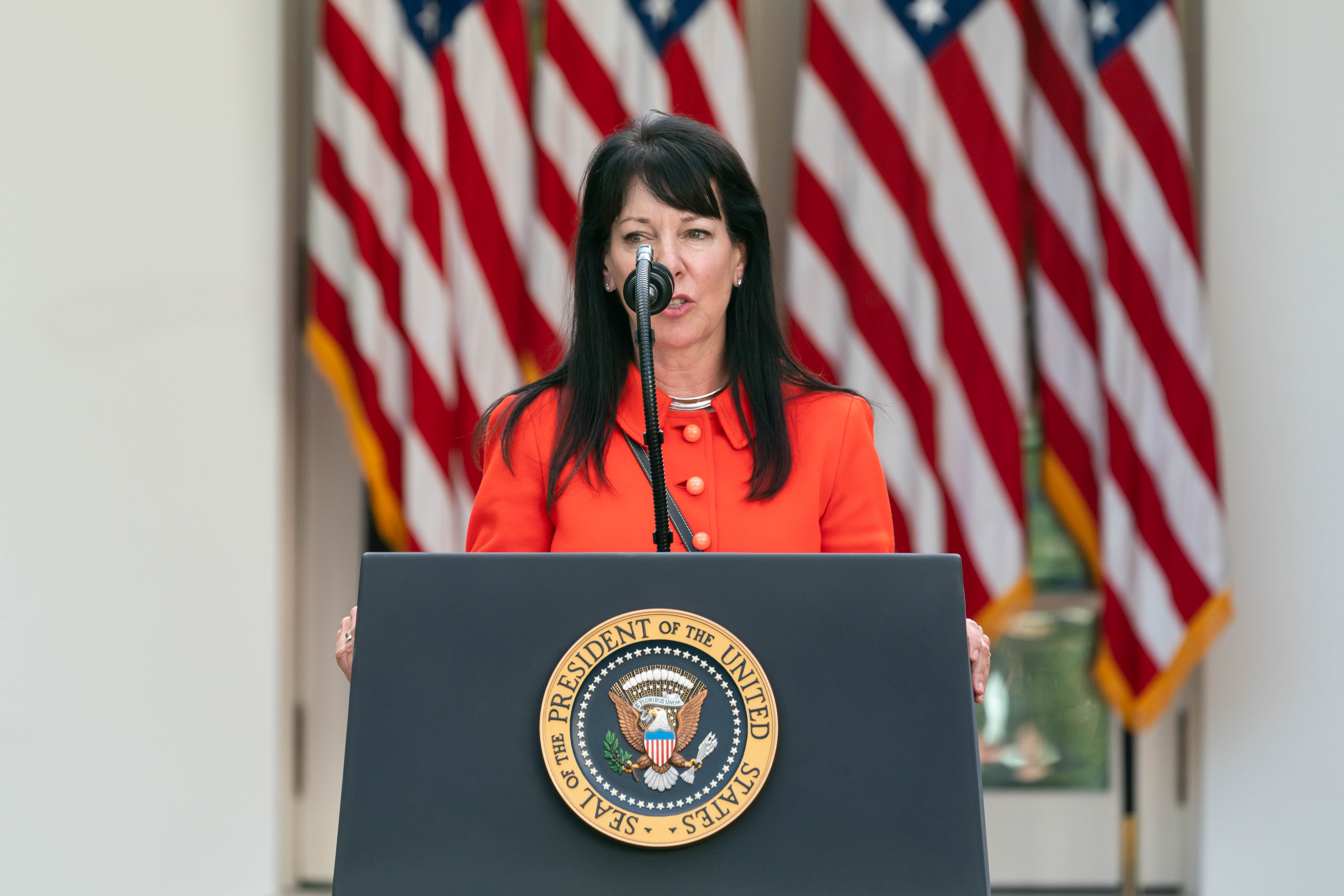
- Education: University of Virginia, New York University
- Title: President and CEO of Rite Aid (2019-2023)

Heyward Donigan is an American business executive. She served as president and CEO of Rite Aid from 2019 to 2023.

== Education ==
She earned a bachelor's degree in English from the University of Virginia and a master's degree in public administration from New York University.

== Career ==
In 1994, Donigan was hired as Senior Vice President at Empire Blue Cross Blue Shield. Previous to that role, Donigan worked at Cigna, General Electric, U.S. Healthcare, and Sanus Health Plans. In 1996, she was named to Crain's New York Business 40 Under 40. Donigan later worked at Premera Blue Cross.

Donigan became president and CEO of ValueOptions in 2010, a behavioral health improvement company focused on providing substance abuse and mental health treatment to Medicaid patients. The company's revenue grew during Donigan's tenure; revenues were $915 million in 2011 and was projected to be $1.5 billion in 2014.

Donigan was president and CEO of Sapphire Digital starting in 2015, a website that analyzes health care plans previously named Vitals.

In 2019, Donigan replaced John Standley as president and CEO of Rite Aid. At the time of her appointment, Donigan was one of 36 women to serve at CEO of a Fortune 500 company, a record at the time. In 2019, Fortune listed her among "powerful women on your radar." Prior to her tenure, Rite Aid had lost market share to competitors CVS and Walgreens, and carried significant debt. Given the financial status of the company, some industry analysts were concerned hiring Donigan was an example of the "glass cliff." While Donigan lacked retail experience, she had previously navigated debt refinancing as a board member at Kindred Healthcare. Donigan planned to focus on fewer markets where the brand still was competitive, and expand the services provided by in-store pharmacists, a strategy supported by industry analysts.

However, Donigan's plans were interrupted by the COVID-19 pandemic. In April 2020, Donigan spoke at a press conference with President Donald Trump to speak about Rite Aid's commitment to COVID-19 testing. Due in part to the pandemic, Donigan's tenure included a move toward remote work for Rite Aid corporate employees, as well as an expansion of digital delivery systems for pharmacy customers. In 2022, Donigan received a Distinguished Leadership Award from The Conference Board for service during challenging times.

During her time at Rite Aid, Donigan closed more than 150 unprofitable stores. Donigan was credited with avoiding the bankruptcy for Rite Aid by pushing debt payments due in 2022 to 2025; however, Deutsche Bank warned the company was in danger of a "dramatic negative inflection point" in April 2022. Other analysts were less skeptical of Donigan's plans; however, recovery for the company was expected to "take time and likely be bumpy." In 2022, Rite Aid widened its annual loss forecast three quarters in a row, resulting in a 48-year low stock price. In January 2023, Rite Aid announced Donigan was leaving the company.

After leaving Rite-Aid, Donigan served at other healthcare focused organizations in consulting and advisory capacities. Donigan joined the board of directors of OnMed, a Tampa-based telehealth company, in October 2024. She was announced as the new CEO of Health Network One, effective January 1, 2025.

== Personal life ==
Donigan is a native of Greenwich, Connecticut. She is the daughter of the Episcopal priest and Tolkien scholar Fleming Rutledge.
