= Victory Supermarkets =

Defunct supermarket chain in New England, USA

Victory Super Markets
- Industry: Retail / Grocery
- Founded: 1923; 103 years ago
- Founder: The DiGeronimo Brothers
- Defunct: 2004; 22 years ago
- Fate: Sold to Hannaford Bros. Co. (then by Big Y in 2016)
- Headquarters: Leominster, Massachusetts
- Number of locations: 20

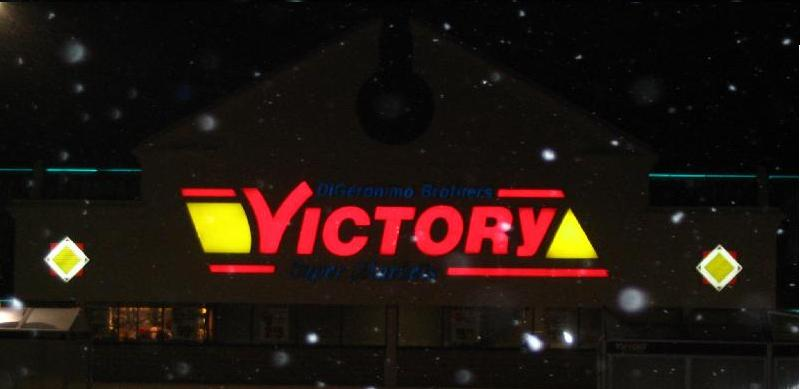

Victory Super Markets was a grocery store chain based in Leominster, Massachusetts that included 20 stores across Massachusetts and New Hampshire. It was founded in 1923 by two DiGeronimo brothers and was originally named after the American war effort in World War I. It acquired 4 Shaw's locations in the Boston Metro Area since around 1999 and 2000. The family-run company was sold to Hannaford Brothers Company in 2004 after a successful 81 year stretch. When it was sold, the company employed over 2,600 workers and had an annual revenue of $385 million. In 2005, the website began redirecting people to the Hannaford website.

== History ==
=== Beginning ===
Following their deployment and America’s subsequent victory in World War I, Italian-American brothers, James and Louis DiGeronimo created a corner market in 1923 in their hometown of Leominster, Massachusetts. This was a small grocery store very different from what it would grow to be. It was owned and operated by the two brothers and specialized in fresh meats and home delivery.

=== The first supermarket ===
The first true super market was opened in 1955 by the founders’ sons. James’ sons were Arthur and Jimmy, while Anthony and Joe were Louis’. These four men expanded the business greatly until its closing nearly half a century later. This supermarket opened where the future headquarters would be located, on North Main Street in Leominster.

=== 3rd generation ===
During the 1980s, the third and final generation of DiGeronimo's came into the family business. This generation was composed of Arthur's sons Arthur Jr., David, Michael, and Steven, and Jimmy's sons Jimmy, John and Robert. Along with their fathers, these ten men made up the DiGeronimo Brothers featured on the company's sign and logo. With the arrival of these new owners, Victory saw great expansion company-wide. These sons took over the day-to-day running of the business and created many new stores and removed old ones over the next two decades.

=== Expansion ===
In 1996, Victory began a new expansion concept in their grocery stores: Market Square. This idea put an emphasis on perishable foods and food-to-go. It offered cafe-style seating, along with sandwich, sushi, and stir fry stations. Market Square was tested out first in the Kingston store. Following success here, Market Square was applied to stores in Leominster, and Derry, New Hampshire. They also bought the Shaw's locations in North Quincy, Norwood, Waltham, Norwell, Massachusetts and closed their Maynard and Amherst, Massachusetts locations by 1999 and 2000.

== Store locations ==
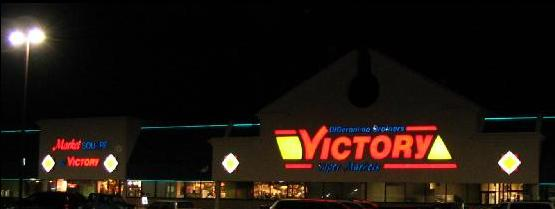

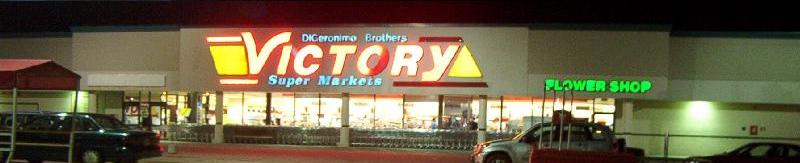

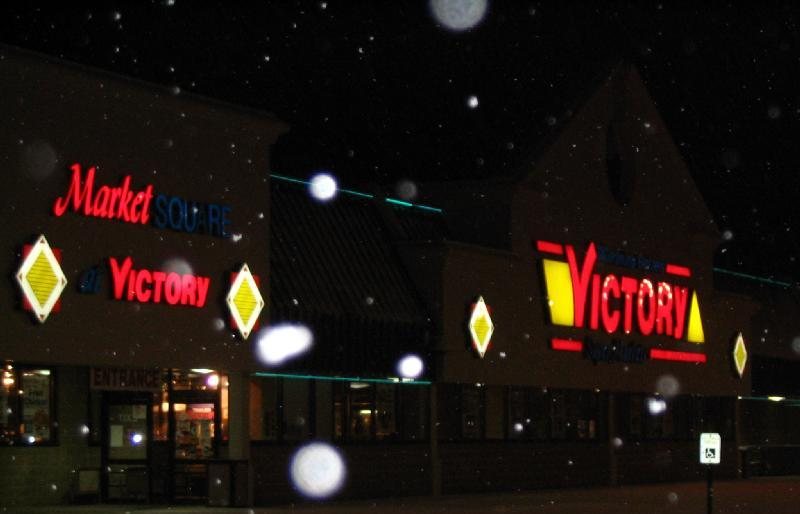

Victory locations as of 2004
Amherst, MA (up till 1999)
Athol, MA
Ayer, MA
Clinton, MA
Dedham, MA (up till 1991)
Derry, NH
Gardner, MA
Hollis, NH (up till 1994)
Fitchburg, MA
Hudson, MA
Kingston, MA
Leominster, MA
Marlborough, MA
Maynard, MA (up till 1999)
Middleborough, MA
Milford, MA (since 1999)
North Brookfield, MA
North Quincy, MA (since 1999)
Norwell, MA (since 1999)
Norwood, MA (since 2000)
Pelham, NH
Pittsfield, MA (up till 1991)
Saugus, MA (up till 1991)
Townsend, MA
Uxbridge, MA
Waltham, MA (since 1999)
Ware, MA (up till 1991)

== Sale of Victory ==
After a long and successful 80 years of family-run business, Victory Super Markets' owners decided to sell the company. It was bought in September 2004 by Hannaford Brothers Company, a subsidiary of the Belgian Delhaize Group, for $175 million. The sale gave Hannaford 19 of Victory's 20 stores. These stores were converted into Hannaford grocery stores (making their locations in Massachusetts spread over Eastern and Central part of the state) while the last remaining store, located in Athol, was shut down because Hannaford already had a larger, more modern store there. A few years later, The Athol location is now owned by Ocean State Job Lot. Hannaford closed the Ayer location in early 2015 and is expected to reopen as an independently-owned Shop 'n Save supermarket supplied by Hannaford. In July 2016, it was announced that 8 of the Hannaford locations would be sold (to Big Y) due to the merger of the parent companies of Hannaford and Stop & Shop.
