= Wellby Super Drug =

Defunct American pharmacy chain serving Northern New England

- Industry: Retail
- Founded: 1973
- Defunct: 1992
- Fate: Sold to Rite Aid
- Headquarters: Scarborough, Maine
- Products: Beauty products, drugs, snacks, beer, photo shop, movies, food and housewares.
- Website: None

Wellby Super Drug was a chain of 41 drug stores that operated in Maine, New Hampshire and Vermont from 1973 until 1992. It was a wholly owned subsidiary of Hannaford Brothers, northern New England's largest grocer.

Wellby stores were typically located next to Hannaford's Shop 'n Save stores.

== History ==
In 1973, Hannaford decided to expand into the retail drugstore market by opening three Wellby Super Drug stores in Maine. From the beginning, these stores were owned directly by the company. By 1987, there were 36 Wellby locations.

In 1990, Maine voted to repeal its blue law that forced stores over 5,000 square feet to close on Sundays. This meant Shop 'n Save stores could be open on Sunday and incorporate a pharmacy of its own, ultimately making standalone Wellby stores redundant to the company.

By 1992, Wellby made up less than five percent of Hannaford's total sales. In order to focus on its core grocery business, the company decided to sell 34 out of 41 of its free-standing Wellby Super Drug stores to Rite Aid. Hannaford instead concentrated on adding pharmacy services into its existing supermarkets.

In 2023, Rite Aid filed for Chapter 11 bankruptcy. On May 5, 2025, Rite Aid filed for Chapter 11 bankruptcy for the second time in 2 years, listing assets and liabilities between $1 billion and $10 billion. Rite Aid sold all of its assets as part of its filing, as it experienced financial challenges such as debt, increased competition, and inflation.
