= Rite Aid =

American drugstore chain

Rite Aid Corporation
- The final logo of Rite Aid as a drugstore chain, used from 2021.

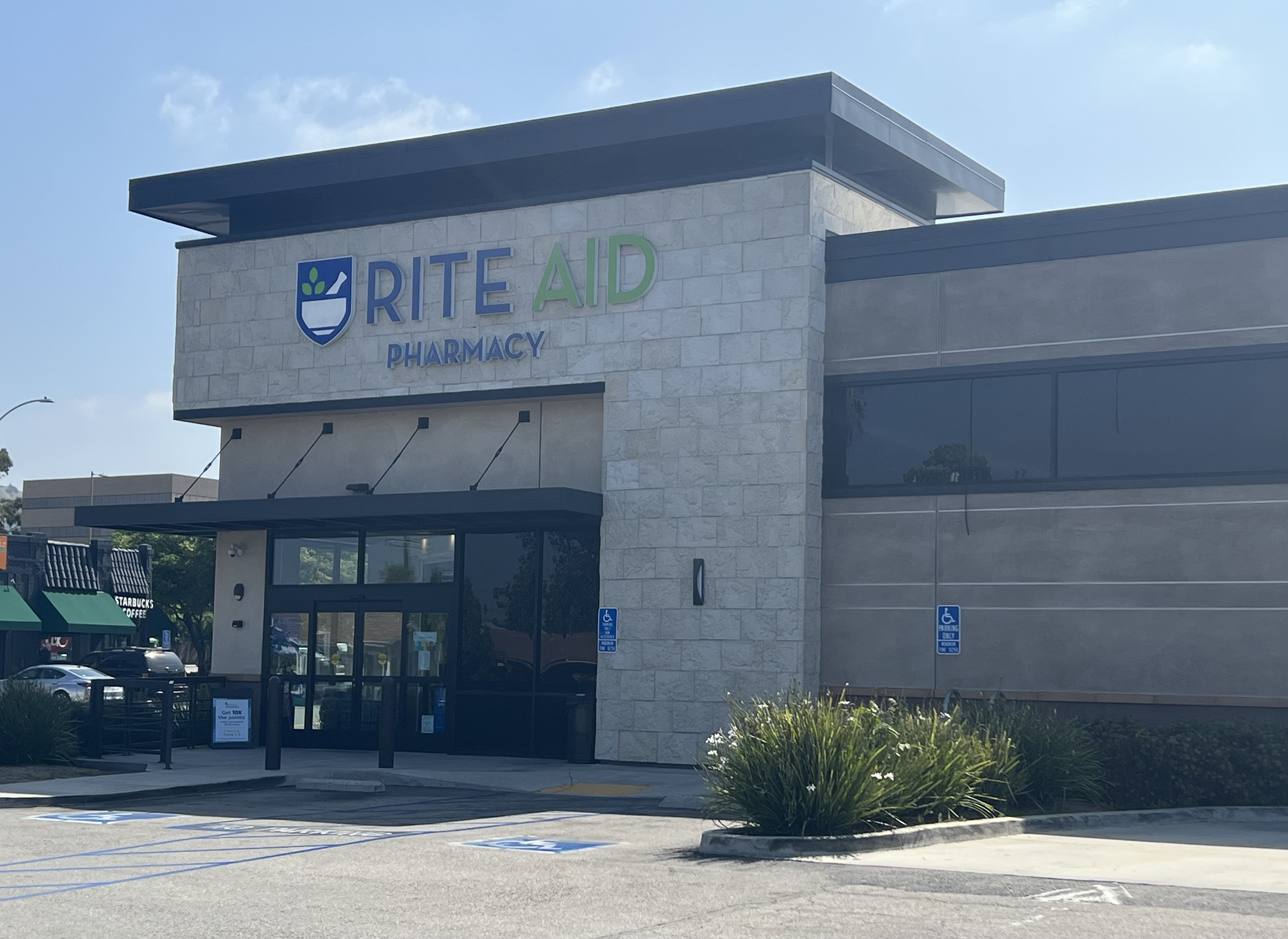
- A Rite Aid store in Glendale, California, in 2023
- Formerly: Thrift D Discount Center (1962–1968)
- Type: Private
- Traded as: NYSE: RAD (1970-2023); OTC Pink: RADCQ (2023-2024)
- Industry: Retail
- Founded: September 12, 1962; 64 years ago In Scranton, Pennsylvania, United States (Original company) 2026 (Website relaunch)
- Founder: Alex Grass
- Defunct: October 3, 2025
- Fate: Chapter 11 bankruptcy and liquidation, trademark ownership transferred to the otherwise unrelated company Rite Aid LLC
- Headquarters: Philadelphia, Pennsylvania, United States (final)
- Number of locations: ▼1,200 (2024); 5,059 (2008)
- Key people: Matt Schroeder (CEO); Steve Bixler (CFO)
- Products: Pharmacy; grocery store; liquor store
- Revenue: ▲US$24.04 billion (FY2021)
- Operating income: ▼US$47.14 million (FY2021)
- Net income: ▲US$−90.9 million (FY2021)
- Total assets: ▼US$9.335 billion (FY2021)
- Total equity: ▼US$615.2 million (FY2021)
- Number of employees: ▼31,000 (2024); 112,800 (2008)
- Subsidiaries: Bartell Drugs
- Website: riteaid.com

Rite Aid Corporation was an American drugstore chain based in Philadelphia. Founded in 1962 in Scranton, Pennsylvania, at its peak it operated more than 5,000 stores. By May 2025, it operated only 1,200 stores across 15 U.S. states and was the seventh-largest pharmacy in the U.S. when taking into account big box chains.

The company filed for Chapter 11 bankruptcy in October 2023 due to a large debt load, thousands of lawsuits alleging involvement in the opioid crisis and a failed restructuring. It emerged in September 2024, but filed again less than a year later in May 2025, liquidating all remaining assets. Trademark ownership has since been transferred to the otherwise-unrelated company named Rite Aid LLC, legally based in Sheridan, Wyoming, which relaunched it as a web-based blood screening business.

== Retail history ==
=== 1962–1989 ===
Rite Aid logo used from 1979 to 2020 as a drugstore chain. Reintroduced by an online Rite Aid operation in 2026.

Alex Grass founded the chain as Thrift D Discount Center in Scranton, on September 12, 1962. The store expanded into five additional states in 1965 and went public as Rite Aid in 1968. It moved to the New York Stock Exchange in 1970, trading under the symbol RAD.

Ten years after its first store opened, Rite Aid operated 267 locations in 10 states. Rite Aid acquired Baltimore's Read's Drug Store in 1977. In June 1981, the Teamsters Local 182 union charged Rite Aid with being locked out. The strike lasted ten months when a National Labor Relations Board meeting was scheduled for July 19, 1982. 1983 marked a sales milestone of $1 billion. A 420-store acquisition along the East Coast expanded Rite Aid's holdings beyond 2,000 locations.

In October 1984, Rite Aid bought the Federal Plaza building in Downtown Youngstown. The company expanded into Michigan through several regional acquisitions in 1984. In 1985, Rite Aid opened stores in Lansing, Michigan, through the acquisition of State Vitamin. Rite Aid expanded further into Ohio in 1987 acquiring Cleveland-based Gray Drug from Sherwin Williams. In 1988, Rite Aid acquired Begley Drug Stores, expanding its presence in Kentucky. On April 10, 1989, Peoples Drug's 114-unit Lane Drug of Ohio from Toledo was purchased by Rite Aid. In November 1989, it was reported by the United Food and Commercial Workers (UFCW) that Rite Aid cut available hours for employees to work at their stores after the Lane Drug purchase.

=== 1990–1999 ===
In the 1990s, Rite Aid partnered with Carl Paladino's Ellicott Development Co. from Buffalo, New York to expand the company's presence in upstate New York. In 1992, Rite Aid bought Wellby Super Drug from Hannaford Brothers of Scarborough, Maine. In January 1994, Rite Aid CEO Martin Grass announced that 200 drugstores would close within six months. The company sold its auto parts, book, and dry cleaning outlets. Rite Aid decided to open seventy-five new drugstores by February 1995.

In May 1994, Rite Aid acquired Waterville, Maine–based LaVerdiere's as part of its expansion into Northern New England. The company acquired twenty-four Hook's Drug Stores of Indianapolis, Indiana, in late 1994, selling nine of the stores to Perry Drug Stores, a pharmacy chain from Pontiac, Michigan. In December 1994, Rite Aid announced that the company would acquire Perry, entering Metro Detroit for the first time and expanding its presence in Michigan even further. In March 1995, Alex Grass stepped down as chairman and CEO. His son, Martin Grass, took over. In July 1995, Rite Aid expanded into Portland, Maine, by purchasing 18 stores from Brooks Pharmacy from Warwick, Rhode Island. Rite Aid sold 30 stores to Brooks in Massachusetts and Rhode Island. Brooks also acquired prescription files from another six stores in Massachusetts.

In November 1995, Rite Aid announced a merger with Revco worth $1.8 billion in cash and stock. The deal fell through after the Federal Trade Commission (FTC) intended to file an antitrust lawsuit. Revco's top executives were against the sale to Rite Aid, although shareholders were for it. In December 1995, Rite Aid said that the Revco deal would have closed about 300 stores and eliminated 1,000 jobs. CVS, based in Woonsocket, Rhode Island, eventually bought Revco in 1997.

In February 1996, the Federal Trade Commission (FTC) required three stores to be divested after the LaVerdiere's purchase in 1994. In April 1996, Rite Aid announced that it was buying Honeyland Pharmacy in Schenectady, New York. On October 14, 1996, the company acquired Thrifty PayLess, a 1,000-store West Coast chain from Los Angeles. The acquisition of Thrifty PayLess included the Bi-Mart membership discount stores headquartered in Eugene, Oregon. A day later, Rite Aid announced it would sell Bi-Mart and it was sold in 1997. In March 1997, Rite Aid announced plans to build a distribution center in Harford County, Maryland, creating 850 jobs. In July 1997, Rite Aid acquired Harco, Inc. and K&B, Inc. which brought the company into the Gulf Coast area.

In mid-January 1998, the company announced that about 200 employees had lost their jobs at its New Orleans distribution center. The company expanded its customer service center in Tuscaloosa, Alabama and created 100 jobs. In late May 1998, HIV/AIDS activists picketed the company, alleging that it inadequately stocked prescriptions to treat HIV.

In 1999, Rite Aid closed 600 poorly performing stores. In September 1999, Rite Aid planned to phase out its distribution center in Farr West, Utah, shifting operations to Los Angeles. On October 19, 1999, Martin Grass, chairman and CEO, stepped down with losses mounting from debt which occurred from rapid expansion. The board of directors named Timothy J. Noonan, Rite Aid's president and COO, as CEO. The board created a new executive committee consisting of four outside directors. On November 16, 1999, Leonard Green took over as chairman of Rite Aid.

On November 23, 1999, Rite Aid announced that new projects were on hold. In early December 1999, Bob Miller took over as chairman and CEO, helping to stabilize and save the company from bankruptcy. Miller had worked 30 years for Albertson's and then Kroger. Rite Aid hired Deloitte & Touche as its auditing firm after KPMG LLP resigned in November. Mary Sammons of Fred Meyer was tapped by Leonard Green of Leonard Green & Partners to become president and chief operating officer. By this time, the company's share price had fallen from a high of $51.125 in January 1999 to a low of $4.40 later in the year, and its bond credit rating had been cut from investment grade to medium-grade junk. David Jessick, a former executive at Thrifty Payless and Fred Meyer, became the chief administrative officer (CAO). John T. Standley, from Fred Meyer, became the chief financial officer (CFO).

=== 2000–2009 ===
In April 2000, Rite Aid announced it had secured $1 billion in credit from Citibank in addition with J.P. Morgan, converting $200 million in bank debt to Rite Aid stock. Rite Aid also announced that it would take PCS Health Systems, Inc., a pharmacy benefit manager (PBM), off the market. In mid July 2000, Rite Aid sold PCS Health Systems to Advance Paradigm for $1 billion. In December 2001, Rite Aid sold off its stores in the Columbus, Ohio, market to CVS. In July 2004, Rite Aid expanded for the first time since nearly collapsing in 1999. The company also sold 1,260 Eckerd Pharmacy stores to CVS. Sammons became CEO in 2003.

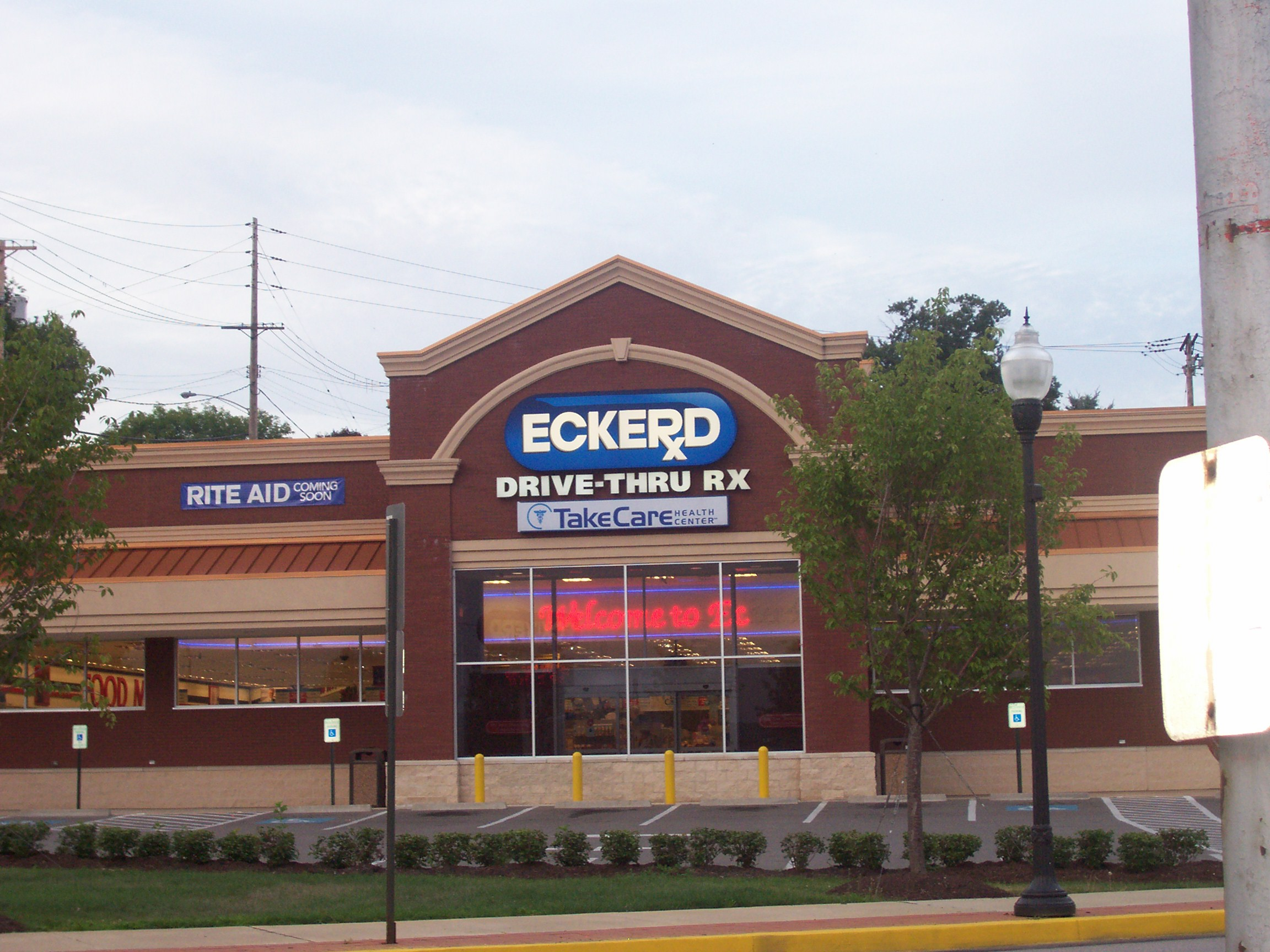
Eckerd store in Rochester, Pennsylvania, pictured shortly before its conversion into a Rite Aid in August 2007

In August 2006, The Wall Street Journal announced that Rite Aid would acquire the U.S. subsidiary of Quebec-based Jean Coutu Group, including 1,850 Eckerd and Brooks Pharmacy stores, for $3.4 billion in cash and issuing stock, giving Jean Coutu a 32% equity stake in Rite Aid. In October 2006, Change to Win Federation (CtW), a labor union, asked Miller to delay a shareholder vote on the merger. The request was denied. The company's shareholders overwhelmingly approved the merger on January 18, 2007. The Federal Trade Commission (FTC) approved the deal on June 2, 2007. The deal closed on June 4 of that year. After an antitrust review, Rite Aid was required to divest 23 stores. Rite Aid later announced that the two chains' stores would be rebranded, retiring the 109-year-old Eckerd banner; all stores were converted to Rite Aid by Late 2007. The merger made Rite Aid the dominant drug store retailer in the Eastern United States and the third largest drug retailer nationwide. At its peak in 2008, Rite Aid had a total of 5,059 stores employing 112,800 people. In March 2008, the company closed some redundant stores, mostly pre-existing Rite Aids from before the Eckerd deal.

On January 4, 2008, Rite Aid announced the closure of all 28 of its stores in the Las Vegas Valley and the sale of patient prescription files from the market to Walgreens. The company said that Las Vegas was a non-core market which had not been contributing to overall results. It had not opened a new store there since 1999. One Nevada store stayed open in Gardnerville, near the California border, where Rite Aid at the time had more than 600 stores. It exited Nevada entirely when the Gardnerville store closed in December 2023.

On February 5, 2009, Rite Aid announced that it would terminate operations of seven Rite Aid stores in San Francisco, along with five stores in eastern Idaho, through a sale to Walgreens.

Founder Alex Grass died of cancer on August 27, 2009.

=== 2010–2019 ===
In June 2010, John Standley was promoted from chief operating officer to chief executive officer, with former CEO Mary Sammons retaining her position as chairperson; Ken Martindale, previously co-president of Pathmark, was named chief operating officer. In April 2013, Jean Coutu Group sold 72.5 million of its shares in Rite Aid to the company. In July 2013, Coutu Group sold its remaining shares of Rite Aid.

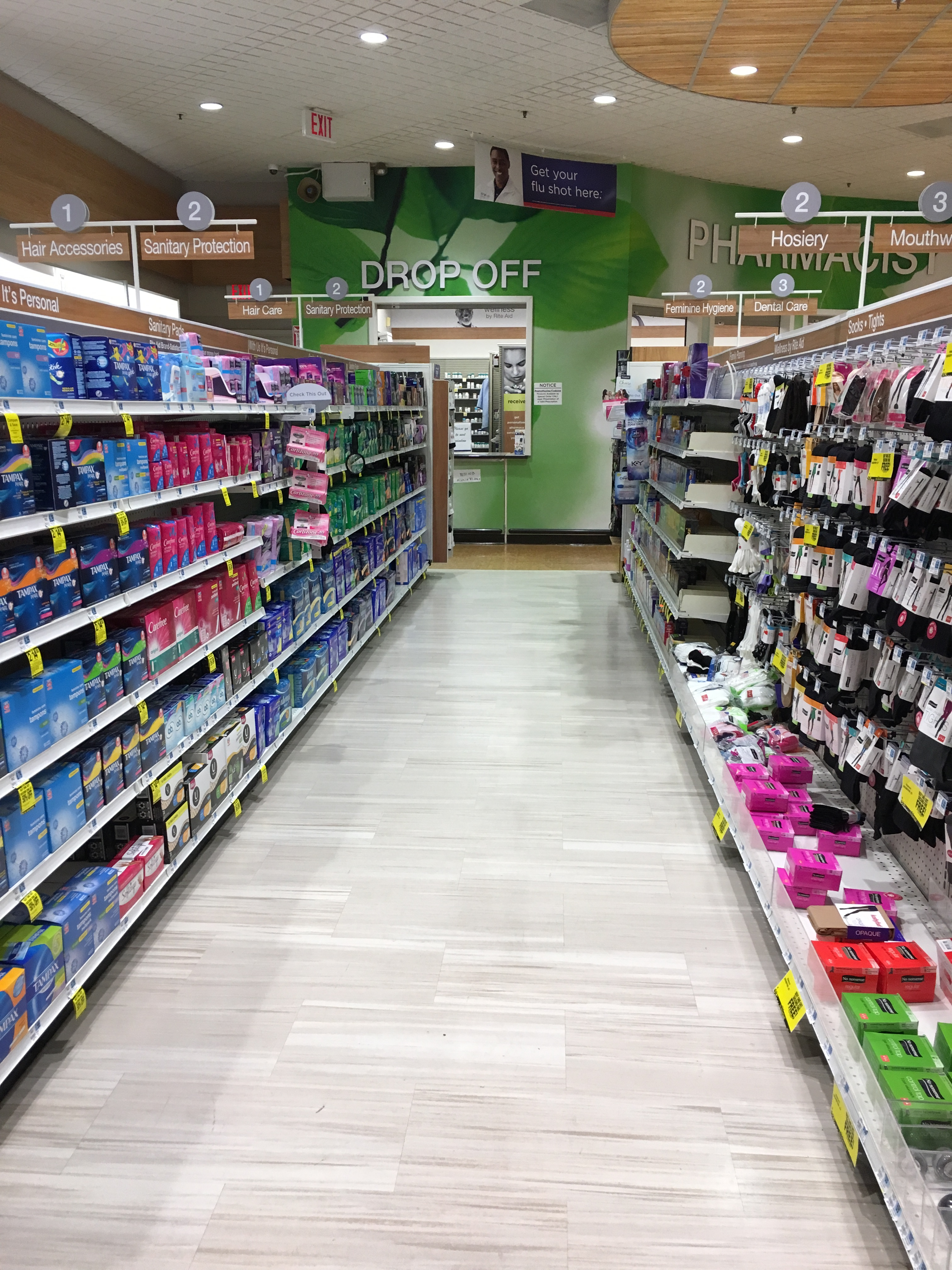
Interior of a Rite Aid store in San Ramon, California, in March 2017

In February 2015, Rite Aid purchased EnvisionRx, a pharmacy benefit manager, which owns subsidiary PBMs MedTrak, Connect Health Solutions, and Smith Premier Services. On October 27, 2015, Walgreens Boots Alliance announced that it expected to acquire Rite Aid for $9.4 billion, pending shareholder and regulatory approval. The combined company would have been the largest pharmacy chain in the United States, reportedly controlling 46% of the market. Walgreens planned to keep the Rite Aid name on existing stores if the deal went through, although the company's long-term plans for the Rite Aid name were unknown.

Most analysts expected that the merger would close by the end of 2016 and it was initially delayed by regulatory review. It was announced on December 21, 2016, that addressing antitrust concerns, Rite Aid would sell 865 stores to Fred's of Memphis, Tennessee, for $950 million, though the Federal Trade Commission (FTC) was dissatisfied with the proposal and requested the sale of 650 additional stores. In January 2017, Rite Aid and Walgreens further delayed the merger's closing to July and reduced the sale price to approximately $6.8 billion. 1199SEIU United Healthcare Workers East, a labor union representing 6,000 Rite Aid employees, announced its opposition to the merger on January 31.

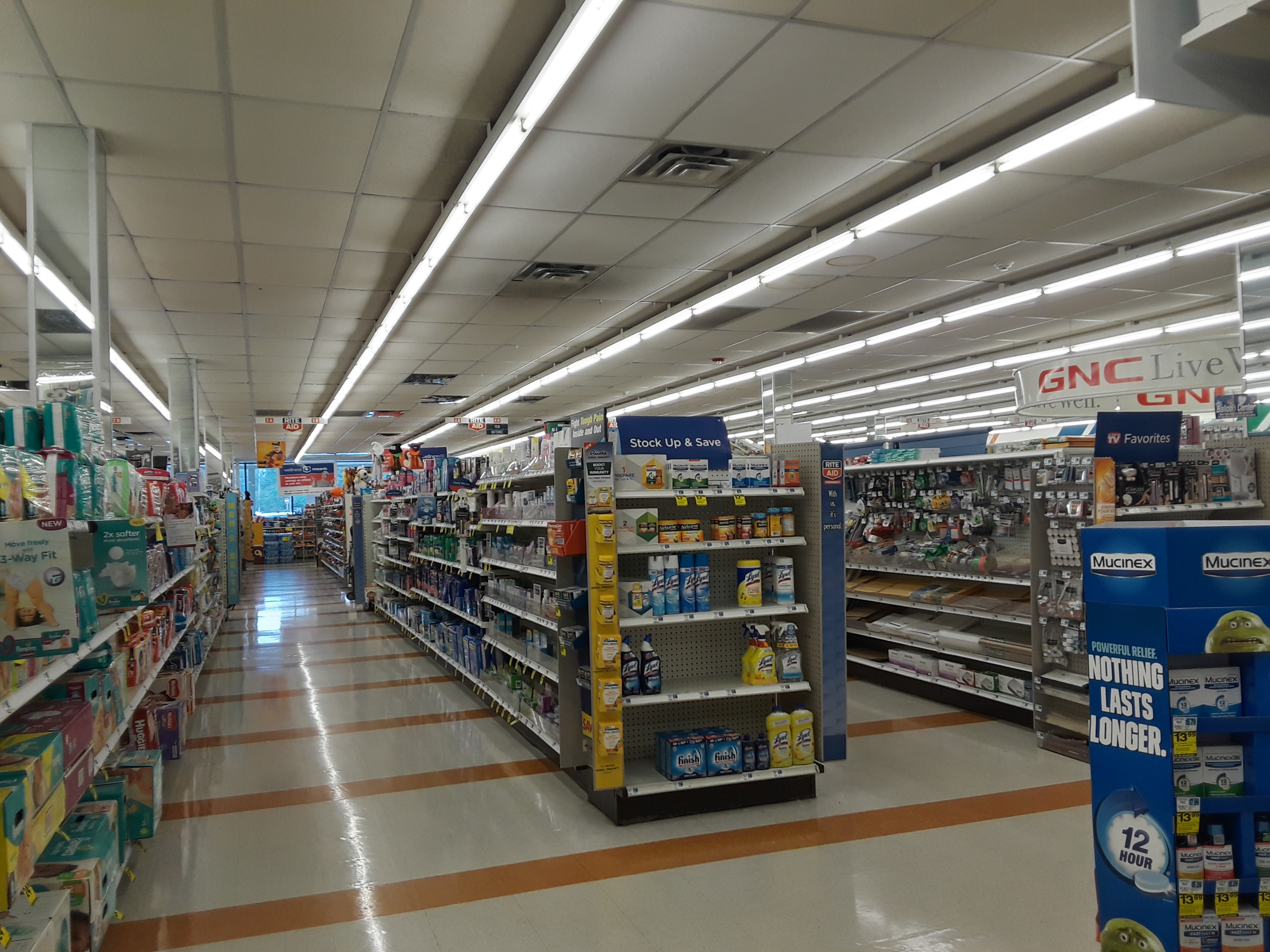
Rite Aid store in Rose Hill, Virginia, in September 2018, before converting to a Walgreens location

On June 29, 2017, Walgreens announced the cancellation of the merger. Walgreens offered to purchase 2,186 Rite Aid stores, less than half of the chain, for $5.18 billion (plus a $325 million cancellation penalty), a deal which effectively would have Rite Aid exiting the southeastern United States. Further negotiations led to a fourth revised deal, with Walgreens buying 1,932 Rite Aid locations for $4.38 billion, which was approved by the FTC on September 19. The revised sale was completed on March 27, 2018, leaving Rite Aid with roughly 2,600 stores. Three distribution centers and related inventory were transferred beginning on September 1, 2018, and the majority of stores were rebranded as Walgreens. Most of the 600 stores which were closed were Rite Aid stores within a mile of an existing Walgreens.

On February 20, 2018, Albertsons announced plans to acquire the remainder of Rite Aid, in a merger of equals, subject to shareholder and regulatory approval. On August 8, 2018, Rite Aid announced that the plan had failed to please shareholders and the proposed acquisition would be cancelled.

=== 2020–2025 ===
In March 2020, a new Rite Aid logo featuring a blue and green color scheme was revealed.

In October 2020, Rite Aid announced the acquisition of the privately held Bartell Drugs, a 67-location Seattle-area chain, for $95 million. Some customers criticized the acquisition with reports of heavy staff turnover and computer system glitches.

In 2022, Rite Aid relocated its headquarters from East Pennsboro Township, Pennsylvania (near Camp Hill), to Philadelphia. By fiscal year 2022, Pennsylvania, with 494 stores, was home to the largest number of Rite Aid locations, followed by California and New York, with 487 and 281 respectively.

==== First bankruptcy ====
On August 25, 2023, Rite Aid announced that it was preparing to file for Chapter 11 bankruptcy protection within the coming weeks, in an effort to settle federal and state lawsuits over the company's role in the opioid crisis. Plans called for the potential closure of up to 500 underperforming locations nationwide. In October 2023, CreditRiskMonitor reported that Rite Aid was nearing a potential bankruptcy filing. On October 4, the company announced that it was not compliant with New York Stock Exchange (NYSE) listing requirements, and that as a result, it faced delisting from the exchange.

On October 15, 2023, amid several opioid lawsuits and legal battles, Rite Aid and some of its affiliated debtors filed for Chapter 11 bankruptcy protection in the United States District Court for the District of New Jersey. The next day, the company was delisted from the NYSE and commenced trading over the counter. The company said in a statement it had secured $3.5 billion in financing and debt reduction agreements from lenders to keep the company afloat through its bankruptcy. Around 500 stores shuttered over the remainder of 2023. On October 16, Rite Aid announced that 92 additional stores would either be shuttered or sold to other pharmacies. On October 18, Rite Aid warned investors that it might not be able to survive its bankruptcy filing and might have to permanently shutter or sell all of its remaining stores over the next twelve months. On the same day, the company announced the closure of 154 stores, and its stock closed at an all-time low of $0.13 per share.

As shown in the company's bankruptcy filings, its 2007 acquisitions, The Jean Coutu Group (PJC) USA Inc. (Jean Coutu's former U.S. subsidiary) and Eckerd Corporation, remain active in-name-only subsidiaries of Rite Aid, despite the conversions of Brooks and Eckerd to Rite Aid and Coutu's sale of its remaining shares in Rite Aid 10 years prior. On October 19, competitor Walgreens agreed to pay $192.5 million in an effort to settle a lawsuit from Rite Aid investors accusing them that their executives misled them about their bid to acquire Rite Aid back in 2017.

On November 16, Rite Aid sued the United States Department of Justice in an effort to block an opioid lawsuit that accused the company of ignoring warnings and falsely filling thousands of prescriptions for addictive opioid medications. On November 21, a bankruptcy judge ordered Rite Aid to fully reorganize its operations by March 1, 2024. Rite Aid warned that if it failed to fully reorganize by the deadline, the company could face liquidation. On November 29, Rite Aid announced the closure of 30 additional stores by December 2023. On December 5, Rite Aid announced that 79 stores would be put up for sale.

On December 19, Rite Aid agreed to a bankruptcy mediation with its opioid victims and creditors that would be supervised by the court. Rite Aid received a loan approval that would allow for the company to receive approximately $200 million. That same day, Rite Aid announced that they had settled with the Federal Trade Commission over their AI-powered facial recognition technology, agreeing to a five-year ban to forbid using facial recognition technology in all of their stores after being accused of misusing the system for falsely identifying shoppers of race and color. The system was originally supposed to be used to identify shoppers likely involved in criminal activity. In addition, Rite Aid announced the closure of 19 additional stores nationwide.

On December 21, Rite Aid canceled an auction for its Elixir division after no other higher bids came in, selling the insurance-related company to MedImpact Healthcare Systems for approximately $575 million. In June 2024, the Detroit Free Press reported that Rite Aid was preparing to close all remaining stores in Michigan. Soon thereafter, the chain filed a WARN notice disclosing plans to close its Waterford, Michigan, distribution center in August 2024, laying off nearly 200 employees. By August, the company had closed or announced the closure of 38% of its stores, amounting to 778 locations, including all stores in Michigan and all but four in Ohio. In September 2024, Rite Aid announced that it was exiting bankruptcy, becoming a privately held company. Matt Schroeder, the former chief financial officer, was elevated to the CEO role.

==== Second bankruptcy and closure ====
Map of Rite Aid stores as of January 2025

After a failed restructuring, on April 4, 2025, it was reported that Rite Aid was preparing to file for Chapter 11 bankruptcy for a second time, while looking into other options such as a possible sale of some or all of its assets. On April 22, Rite Aid announced that it would be preparing to sell itself in multiple pieces as it had run low on cash. It was announced that the vast majority of stores were expected to be sold to the highest-paying bidders, whereas stores not sold would shut down.

On May 5, 2025, Rite Aid filed for Chapter 11 bankruptcy for the second time in two years, listing assets and liabilities between $1 billion and $10 billion. Rite Aid stated that it would sell all of its assets and close all remaining pharmacies as part of the procedure, as it worked to overcome financial challenges such as debt, increased competition, and inflation. The company planned to eliminate all jobs after its failure to secure financing, as well as close or sell all of its remaining 1,200 locations. Rite Aid claimed that it was unable to keep store shelves stocked at many of its locations due to lenders walking away from the company. Later that month, it was reported that Rite Aid would close 115 stores in 10 states within weeks and that the last day to place bids for its pharmaceutical assets would be May 13, with auctions being held the next day. The last day to place bids for the company's remaining assets was June 13, with auctions being held on June 20. On May 13, Rite Aid announced that the last day to use gift cards, coupons, and rewards, as well as the last day for returns and exchanges, would be June 5. On May 14, Rite Aid announced more closures of stores.

On May 15, Rite Aid sold pharmacy prescriptions at over 1,000 of its locations to many retailers, such as CVS Pharmacy, Walgreens, Albertsons, and Kroger. CVS Pharmacy was identified as the largest bidder, buying prescription files from 600 locations in 15 states, as well as purchasing 64 Rite Aid stores in the states of Idaho, Oregon, and Washington. The sale was approved on May 21. On May 16, Rite Aid announced the closure of 27 more locations. By May 27, 360 locations were slated to close. Rite Aid stated the company was unable to find buyers for prescriptions at these locations. On May 29, Giant Eagle acquired pharmacy prescription files from 78 Rite Aid locations in Pennsylvania and Ohio. By June 6, more than 800 locations had been closed since October 2023. On June 9, another 230 stores were reported to be closing. On June 27, 2025, Rite Aid received court approval to sell its Thrifty PayLess and Thrifty Ice Cream subsidiaries to the privately held company Hilrod Holdings for $19.2 million. Hilrod Holdings is managed by Hilton Schlosberg and Rodney Sacks, top executives for Monster Beverage. On July 6, 2025, it was reported that 114 more stores would be closing, bringing the total count of closures over 1,000. As of July 2025, 1,184 Rite Aid stores that were open before the company's second bankruptcy have either closed or are conducting liquidation sales, leaving only 56 stores still operating. On August 31, Rite Aid announced 27 more store closures in September.

On October 3, 2025, Rite Aid announced it had closed the remaining 56 stores and would liquidate all remaining assets. Two locations in Bainbridge Island, Washington, and Bend, Oregon, were listed as the last operating Rite Aid locations, with CVS Pharmacy taking over both locations after September 29, 2025. By October 15, CVS was officially running 63 former Rite Aid locations and had transferred customer prescription files from 626 pharmacies.

=== Website relaunch ===
In 2026, Rite Aid's website was relaunched under new ownership using the company's traditional red and blue logo. Rite Aid LLC now markets the business as a web-based blood screening business through a partnership with Quest Diagnostics but has no plans to open as a brick-and-mortar chain.

== Finances ==
| Year | Revenue in thousands USD | Net income in thousands USD | Total assets in thousands USD | Employees | Stores |
|---|---|---|---|---|---|
| 2005 | 16,715,598 | 302,478 | 5,932,583 | 71,200 | 3,356 |
| 2006 | 17,163,044 | 1,273,006 | 6,988,371 | 70,200 | 3,323 |
| 2007 | 17,399,383 | 26,826 | 7,091,024 | 69,700 | 3,333 |
| 2008 | 24,326,846 | −1,078,990 | 11,488,023 | 112,800 | 5,059 |
| 2009 | 26,289,268 | −2,915,420 | 8,326,540 | 103,000 | 4,901 |
| 2010 | 25,669,117 | −506,676 | 8,049,911 | 97,500 | 4,780 |
| 2011 | 25,214,907 | −555,424 | 7,555,850 | 91,800 | 4,714 |
| 2012 | 26,121,222 | −368,571 | 7,264,385 | 90,000 | 4,667 |
| 2013 | 25,392,263 | 118,105 | 6,985,038 | 89,000 | 4,623 |
| 2014 | 25,526,413 | 249,414 | 6,860,672 | 89,000 | 4,587 |
| 2015 | 26,528,377 | 2,109,173 | 8,777,425 | 89,000 | 4,570 |
| 2016 | 30,736,657 | 165,465 | 11,277,010 | 90,000 | 4,561 |
| 2017 | 32,845,073 | 4,053 | 11,593,752 | 88,000 | 4,536 |
| 2018 | 21,528,968 | −349,532 | 8,989,327 | 60,800 | 2,550 |
| 2019 | 21,639,557 | −666,954 | 7,591,367 | 53,100 | 2,464 |
| 2020 | 21,928,390 | −469,219 | 9,452,369 | | |
| 2021 | 24,043,240 | −100.07 | | | 2,451 |
| 2022 | 24,568,260 | −538,478 | | | 2,229 |
| 2023 | 24,091,900 | −749,936 | | | 2,102 |

== Customer loyalty and rewards programs ==
The Wellness+ card was Rite Aid's free shopping rewards card. Launched nationwide on April 18, 2010, it became a part of the American Express–backed Plenti rewards program in May 2015, in which customers would earn Plenti points with each purchase. Rite Aid returned the Wellness+ program on January 1, 2018, with Wellness+ BonusCash redeemable at Rite Aid stores, ahead of Plenti's shutdown and bankruptcy on July 10, 2018.

Rite Aid's rewards programs were ended on June 5, 2025, as part of its closure and second and final bankruptcy.

== Partnerships ==
General Nutrition Centers (GNC) and Rite Aid formed a partnership in January 1999, adding GNC stores-within-stores at roughly 1,500 Rite Aid pharmacies. A partnership with Drugstore.com in June 1999 allowed customers of Rite Aid to place medical prescription orders online for same-day, in-store pickup.

Amazon announced in June 2019 that Amazon shoppers would be able to pick up their purchases at designated counters inside more than 100 Rite Aid stores across the US. The new service is called Counter and launched in the U.S. after being used in the UK with the Next clothing chain and in Italy with Giunti Al Punto Librerie, Fermopoint, and SisalPay stores.

In May 2022, Rite Aid partnered with Homeward, a rural home care startup. Under the partnership, Medicare-eligible customers have been directed to Homeward's clinical services and have access to Homeward mobile care units.
