= Fred's =

Defunct American regional retail store chain

Fred's Inc.
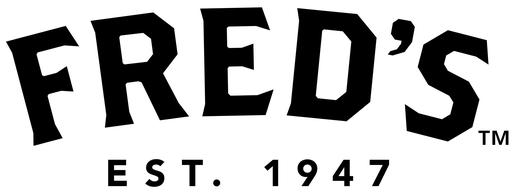
- Type: Public
- Traded as: OTC Pink: FREDQ; Nasdaq: FRED
- Industry: Discount store
- Founded: 1947; 79 years ago Coldwater, Mississippi, U.S.
- Founders: Paul Baddour; Victor Baddour; Charles Baddour
- Defunct: October 30, 2019; 6 years ago
- Fate: Bankruptcy
- Headquarters: Memphis, Tennessee, U.S.
- Number of locations: 557 stores (2018) (April 11, 2019)
- Areas served: Southeastern United States
- Key people: Heath Freeman (chairman); Michael Bloom (CEO)
- Products: Garden Supplies, Snacks, Toys, Books, Food, Housewares, Videos, DVDs, Music
- Brands: Various
- Revenue: ▼US$ 2.125 billion (2016)
- Operating income: ▼US$ -74.7 million (2016)
- Net income: ▼US$ -66.53 million (2016)
- Total assets: ▼US$ 699.41 million (2016)
- Total equity: ▼US$ 337.2 million (2016)
- Number of employees: 7,324 (2016)
- Divisions: EntrustRx
- Subsidiaries: Getwell Drug & Dollar; Yazoo Trading Company
- Website: web.archive.org/web/20190222112049/http://fredsinc.com/

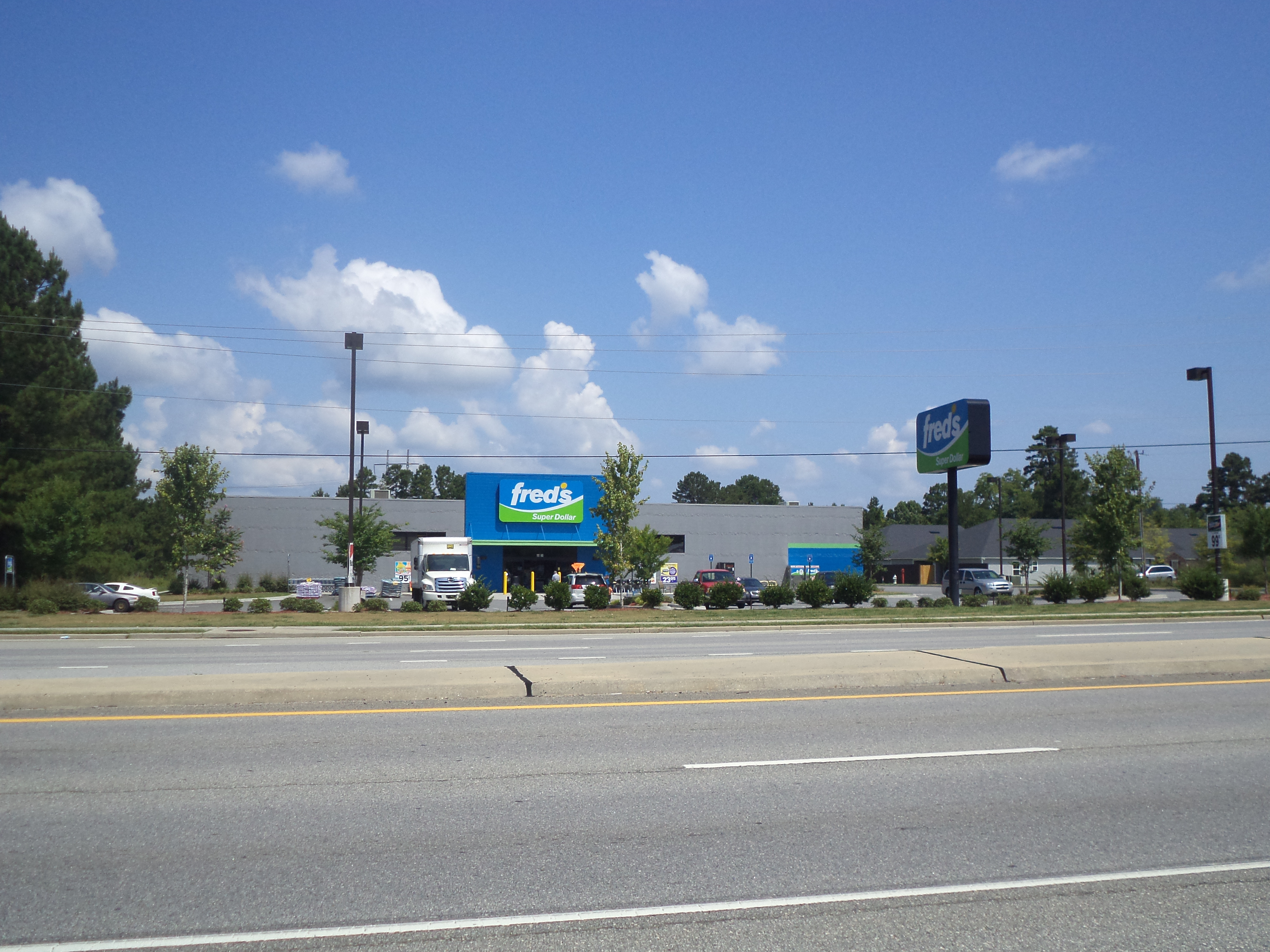
Fred's Super Dollar store in Lowndes County, Georgia in June 2014. Closed in 2019.

Fred's Inc. (stylized in all caps) was a retail store chain headquartered in Memphis, Tennessee, operating in 15 states in the southeastern United States. As of June, 2019 Fred's operated 396 locations, of which 155 were pharmacies, and the remainder discount general merchandise stores. In July 2019 Fred's announced 129 pending store closures, following which it would have 80 retail stores and 166 pharmacies remaining. This followed earlier store closing announcements in April and June 2019.

On September 9, 2019 Fred's announced that it was seeking liquidation under Chapter 11 of the US Bankruptcy Code and would close all remaining locations and liquidate all remaining merchandise and fixtures.

== History ==
This logo was used by Fred's until 2007, however, it still appeared on occasion on store signs and on some of Fred's private label items.

Brothers Paul, Victor, and Charles Baddour opened a dry-goods store named Good Luck in Coldwater, Mississippi, in 1947. Paul later incorporated the company as Baddour, Inc. As the chain expanded throughout the Southeast, he began naming the stores Fred's Dollar Stores after his older brother, Fred. In 1953, Fred's moved its corporate headquarters to Memphis, Tennessee.

Fred's primarily competed against national, deep-discount chains Dollar General, Family Dollar, and Dollar Tree, and against independently owned stores. Most locations were in towns with populations of 15,000 or less.

The company has had two distribution centers: one in Memphis, another in Dublin, Georgia.

Fred's Inc. had owned and operated two smaller additional chains, Getwell Drug & Dollar and Yazoo Trading Company.

Getwell Drug & Dollar was a pharmacy that also offers over-the-counter medication and individualized patient care, the name being a play on the location of the Fred's, Inc. home office on Getwell Road in Memphis. Locations were across Alabama, Tennessee, Georgia and Mississippi also featured more than 1,700 one-dollar items.

Yazoo Trading Company offered hardware, auto, and pet and animal supplies. Five locations were across Alabama, Tennessee and Georgia and also provided basic home project needs.

In 2008, Fred's decided to close over 50 under-performing stores due to rising fuel costs and other economic issues. For example, several North Carolina locations were closed, leaving over a dozen stores in that state.

On December 21, 2016, it was announced that Fred's would acquire 865 stores as a result of the Walgreens Boots Alliance/Rite Aid merger expected to close in 2017 for the price of US$950 Million. The acquisition would have more than doubled the number of stores Fred's operated. However, on June 29, 2017, WBA withdrew plans to acquire Rite Aid and instead opted to buy about half of their stores, a move which nullified Fred's planned acquisition of the Rite Aid stores. Fred's received $25 million as compensation for expenses of the now-terminated merger deal.

In February 2017 Chief Executive Officer Jerry A. Shore retired and was replaced by Michael Bloom, former CEO of Family Dollar, where he resigned after the company was unhappy with financial results.

=== Decline ===
During early 2019, deteriorating performance prompted Fred's to plan to close the vast majority of the stores, shrinking their number from 568 (as of February 2) to just 80 – an over 85% decline – in four waves:

- April 11, 159 stores were slated to be liquidated and closed by the end of May due to declining sales and timing of lease expirations at the affected locations;
- May 16, 104 stores by the end of June;
- June 21, 49 stores by the end of the summer;
- July 12, 129 stores

However, rather than continuing efforts to remain in business on a greatly reduced scale, the company announced on September 9, 2019 that it was filing for Chapter 11 bankruptcy and ending operations. It was delisted from NASDAQ on September 18, 2019, and became listed on the OTC Markets Group. According to the terms of the bankruptcy filing, all stores were required to cease operations by October 30, 2019.

== Philanthropy ==
Fred's had donated either through corporate donation or voluntary in-store requests to several national charities.

- American Cancer Society – employees have donated their time and financial support for the American Cancer Society through their involvement in "Making Strides" events. Since becoming involved in the annual walk in 2004, the Fred's team raised more than $187,404.
- Children's Miracle Network Hospitals – stores helped raise more than $5.5 million to benefit the Children's Miracle Network Hospitals. Shoppers were able to purchase a Miracle Balloon at any Fred's location. All the proceeds from the sale of the paper balloons benefited the Children's Miracle Network Hospital in the community where the Miracle Balloon was purchased. With each donation, customers receive a coupon for $1 off two bags of Mars Candy. The 2013 campaign set a record with a total of $746,286 raised, which was a 16.9 percent increase over the 2012 campaign total.
- "Hero Hats" – As a memorial to victims of the September 11 attacks, stores ran an annual fundraiser, donating the proceeds to local emergency services programs. Profits of sales on September 11 each year were also donated to the program.
- The "Panda Pals" Program – the campaign was designed to benefit animal care, conservation and research at the Memphis Zoo. Customers at the 182 Fred's stores located in a 200-mile radius of the zoo generously donated during the annual event. Since it began in 2003, the Panda Pal program has contributed more than $750,000 to the Memphis Zoo.
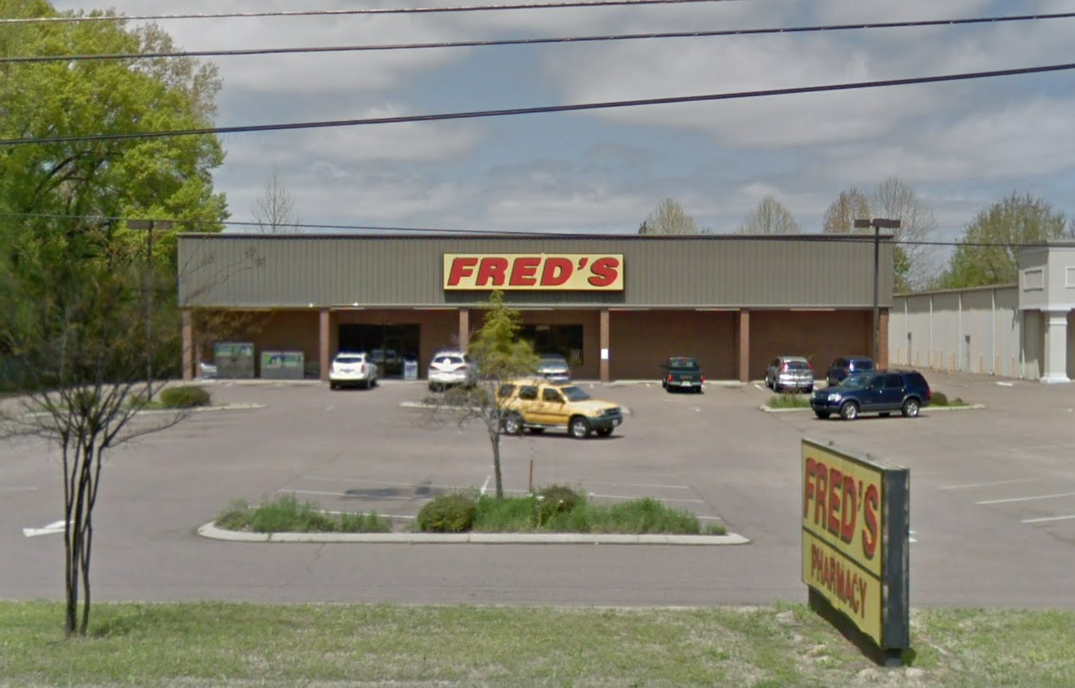
- Fred's Store in Arlington, Tennessee, with the former logo used prior 2007, seen in April 2019. Closed in 2019.
  United Way of America – employees participated in fundraising since 1999 and have donated more than $500,000 since 2005.
