= Peoples Drug =

American drug store chain

Peoples Drug Stores
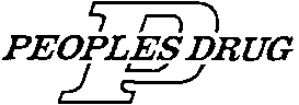
- Trade name: Peoples Drug
- Type: Retail/Pharmacy
- Founded: 1905; 121 years ago in Washington, D.C.
- Founder: Malcolm Gibbs
- Defunct: May 1994; 32 years ago
- Fate: Acquired by CVS
- Headquarters: Alexandria, Virginia
- Products: Pharmacy, Liquor, Cosmetics, Health and Beauty Aids, General Merchandise, Snacks, 1 Hour Photo

Peoples Drug was a chain of drugstores based in Alexandria, Virginia. Founded in 1905, Peoples was subsequently purchased by Lane Drug in 1975, Imasco in 1984, and finally by CVS in 1990, which continued to run the stores under the Peoples banner until 1994, at which time the stores were converted to CVS, marking the end of the use of the Peoples Drug name.

== History ==
Peoples Drug was founded in 1905 by Malcolm Gibbs in Alexandria, Virginia. Shortly after, it opened a location at 7th Street, NW in Washington, D.C. By 1909, it moved to a bigger location in Mount Vernon Square. A second location was opened in 1912, and another two were added four years later. Peoples Drug took over W.S. Thompson Drugstore at 15th Street and G Street, operating it as a branch of Peoples.

By 1944, it had 130 stores operating under the Peoples Drugs, Days Drug, and Shearer Drug names. There were variations of the name, with Peoples Service Drug, and Gibbs Peoples Drug being most common.

In 1970, Peoples had 252 stores operating in the District of Columbia, Maryland, Virginia, Pennsylvania, Ohio, West Virginia, North Carolina, South Carolina, Florida, New York, and New Jersey. That year there were 5,500 employees, with sales of $220 million and profits of $1.87 million. In 1972, Lane Drug of Toledo, Ohio, purchased a 22% interest in Peoples.

=== Acquisition by Lane Drug ===
In 1975, the chain was purchased outright by Lane Drug, creating a combined company of 380 stores. Lane president Sheldon "Bud" Fantle became chairman, president, and chief executive officer Peoples. The new company retained the Peoples name, and included Lane Drug, Schuman Drug, Dynamic Drug, Health Mart, Read Drug, and Lee Drug.

In 1980, Peoples acquired the Indianapolis-based Haag Drug which had 80 drug stores in Indiana, Iowa, Illinois and Kentucky. It also acquired the 21-store Drug Fair Inc. based in Iowa and Minnesota in June 1981.

In 1985, two 35,000-square-foot (3,300 m^{2}) "Bud's Deep Discount Drug Stores" were opened in the Toledo area, with others in the Washington, D.C. metropolitan area. The name "Bud's" was derived from the nickname of Sheldon "Bud" Fantle. In January 1987, Mr. Fantle left Peoples and later took control of troubled Dart Drug in Washington, D.C., renaming those stores Fantle's.

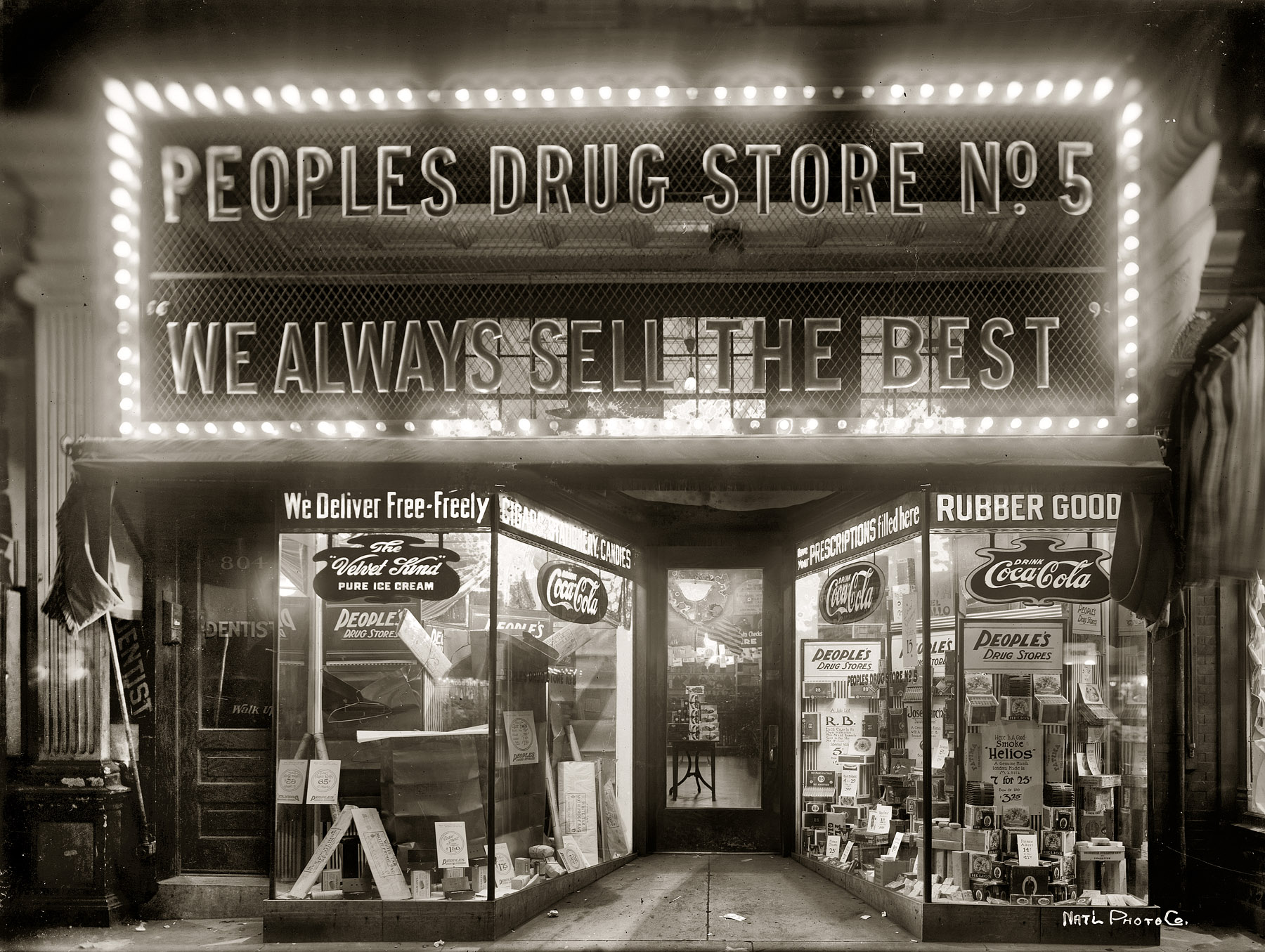
Peoples Drug store in Washington, D.C., c. 1920

=== Acquisition by Imasco ===
In 1984, Peoples was acquired for $320 million (~$815 million in 2024) by the Canadian conglomerate Imasco, the Canadian arm of British American Tobacco, and owner of Shoppers Drug Mart and Pharmaprix in Canada. At the time, Peoples had 600 stores as one of the country's leading drug chains.

After being acquired by Imasco, Peoples quickly acquired Rea & Derick in 1985 and also took control of the Florida Shoppers Drug Mart locations.

Over the years, the Haag stores were converted to Peoples in 1983, and Dynamic and Schuman were converted to Lane. A program was implemented to convert all stores to the Peoples Drug name. Many Lane and Rea & Derick stores were converted, all stores began selling Peoples Brand product, and began using bags with the Peoples Drug logo. Not long after being acquired by Imasco in 1984, Peoples sold some stores to concentrate on the Mid-Atlantic states.

First to go were the 35 Florida Shoppers Drug Mart stores that was sold to Eckerd in 1986. Next was the Atlanta-based Reed/Lee Drug to Big B Drugs in 1989 for $50 million (~$110 million in 2024). The 85-store division gave Big B its entrance into the Atlanta market, a goal they had been working on for years. The next sale was the 114-store Lane drug to Rite Aid, effective April 11, 1989.

The last phase was the Indiana division of Peoples being sold in 1989 to a group of former Rite Aid officials that was headed by Roger Grass, changing the former Peoples stores to Reliable Drugs. Reliable survived only four years before it filed for bankruptcy and its stores were sold off to Osco Drug and Rite Aid in 1993.

=== Sale to CVS ===
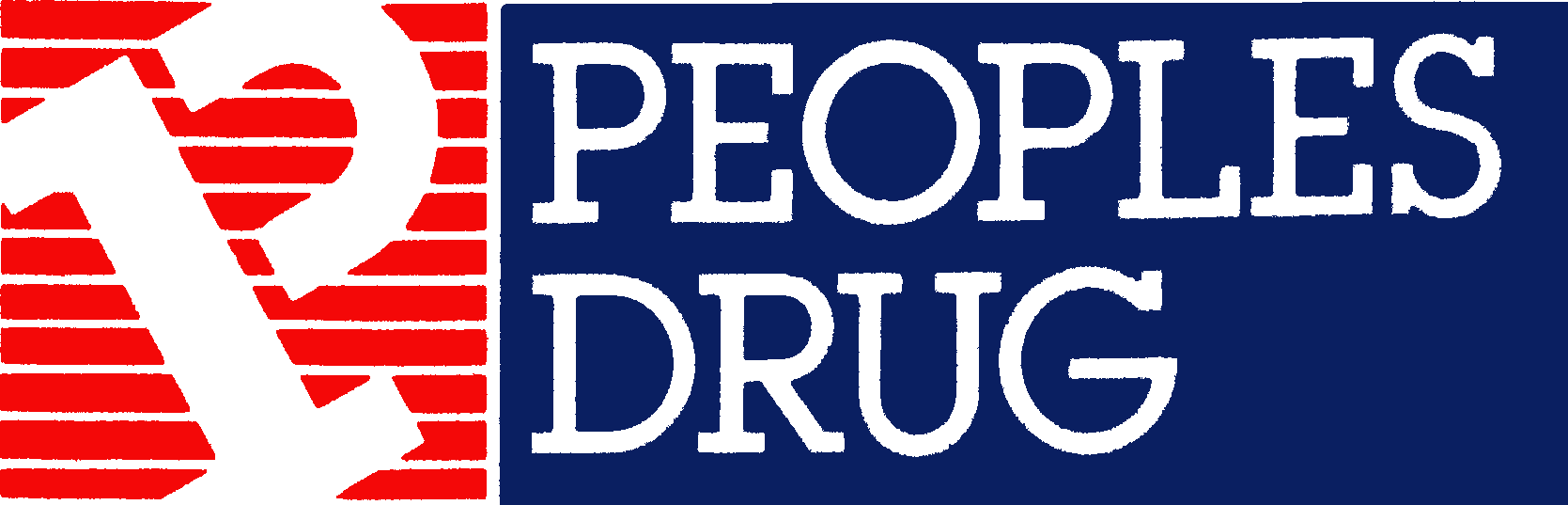
Final Peoples Drug logo (late 1980s–mid 1990s) before conversion to CVS name

After the dust settled from the sales, Imasco decided to unload the Peoples Drug chain, as Peoples was not performing at the level Imasco had hoped. In 1990, Melville Corporation, owner of CVS, purchased Peoples for $330 million (~$698 million in 2024). CVS kept the Peoples Drug name in place, remodeled most stores to the CVS format, and improved the stores' sales. The Peoples name was considered to be too strong a name to change it to CVS pharmacy immediately. The name did ultimately change in May 1994, just a few months before the Peoples Drug name would have celebrated its 90th anniversary.

== Legacy ==
In May 2018, a bar and restaurant called The People's Drug opened in Alexandria, Virginia. According to the owners, the name was picked as a tribute to the local pharmacy chain that was once known for its lunch counters.
