= John T. Standley =

American businessman (born 1964)

- Born: April 20, 1964 (age 62); United States
- Education: Pepperdine University
- Occupation: Business executive
- Known for: President of Walgreens c. 2020

John T. Standley (born April 20, 1964) is an American business executive who became the corporate president of Walgreens c. 2020.

== Early life and education ==
Born in 1964, Standley received a Bachelor of Science from Pepperdine University.

== Career ==
Standley was chief executive officer and a board member of Pathmark Stores, Inc. and held executive financial positions at several other grocery and retail companies. A former chair of the National Association of Chain Drug Stores (NACDS) and board member of CarMax, Inc. and Supervalu, Inc, Standley was chairman and CEO of Rite Aid Corporation until being replaced as CEO on August 8, 2019, by Heyward Donigan, whereafter he joined Walgreens Boots Alliance.
