= Leonard I. Green =

American businessman (1934–2002)

- Born: 1934; United States
- Died: 2002 (aged 68); Venice, Italy
- Education: B.A. Cornell University; M.B.A. University of Pennsylvania; J.D. Loyola University (Chicago)
- Occupation: Businessman
- Known for: Founder of leveraged buyout firm Leonard Green & Partners
- Spouse: Jude Risk Green (divorced)
- Children: 2

Leonard I. Green (1934–2002) was an American businessman who was the founding partner of leveraged buyout firm Leonard Green & Partners and chairman of the board of the Los Angeles Opera.

== Early life ==
Green was raised in Philadelphia, to a Jewish family. In 1955, he earned a B.A. in economics from Cornell University and in 1956, graduated with an M.B.A. from the University of Pennsylvania's Wharton Graduate School. In 1965, he received a Juris Doctor degree from Loyola University in Chicago.

== Career ==
In 1969, Green co-founded the New York investment banking partnership, Gibbons, Green, van Amerongen, which specialized in management-led, non-hostile leveraged buyouts. In 1980, he moved to California and opened a branch office. In 1989, he left Gibbons, Green, van Amerongen and founded Leonard Green & Partners based in Los Angeles. In 1992, Green's firm paid $40 million for Thrifty Drugs and in 1994, they purchased Payless Drugs for $1.2 billion, merging the two companies to form the largest drugstore chain in the Western U.S. with more than 1,080 outlets, Thrifty Payless. In April 1996, Thrifty Payless went public and then in October 1996, it was sold to Rite Aid for $2.3 billion netting Green's firm a $420 million profit. Other companies that the firm acquired while Green was chairman were Carr-Gottstein Foods Co., Australian Resources Limited, and Big 5 Sporting Goods.

== Philanthropy ==
In 1986, Green became a founding director of Los Angeles Opera serving as its president and chief executive from 1998 to 2001. He personally donated $2 million to the opera and was credited with recruiting Plácido Domingo as artistic director. Green was also a member of the board of the Music Center of Los Angeles County.

== Personal life and death ==
Green was married three times. In 1995, Green married his third wife, Jude Green, from Michigan; they divorced in 2000. Green has two children.

Green died in 2002.
