= Leonard Green & Partners =

American private equity investment firm

Leonard Green & Partners, L.P.
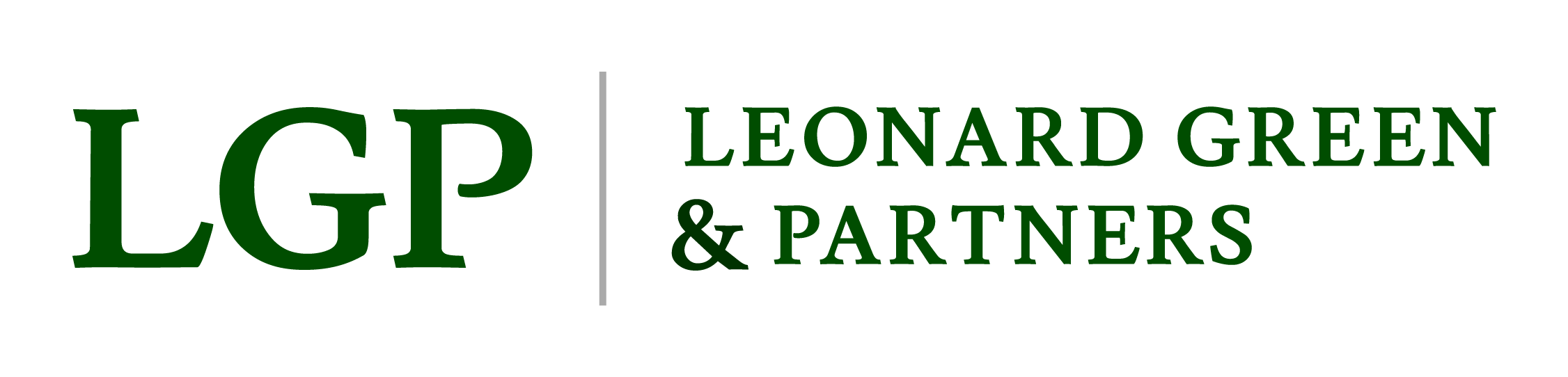
- Type: Private
- Industry: Private equity
- Founded: January 7, 1989; 37 years ago
- Founder: Leonard I. Green
- Headquarters: Los Angeles, California, United States
- Products: Leveraged buyout
- AUM: US$77.8 billion (2024)
- Number of employees: 87 (2024)
- Website: leonardgreen.com

Leonard Green & Partners, L.P. (LGP) is an American private equity investment firm founded in 1989 and based in Los Angeles. The firm specializes in private equity investments. LGP has invested in over 95 companies since its inception, including Petco and The Container Store.

In June 2024, Leonard Green and Partners ranked 18th in Private Equity International's PEI 300 ranking among the world's largest private equity firms.

== History ==
Leonard Green was founded by Leonard I. Green in 1989 after separating from Gibbons, Green and van Amerongen Ltd. (Gibbons Green), a bank which he had co-founded in 1969 with Edward Gibbons and Lewis van Amerongen. Leonard Green died in 2002, leaving the firm to be run by John G. Danhakl, Peter J. Nolan and Jonathan D. Sokoloff.

The firm's predecessor, Gibbons Green, was among the earliest practitioners of the leveraged and management buyout. Gibbons Green purchased several companies, including Purex Industries in 1982, Budget Rent a Car from Transamerica in 1986 and Kash n' Karry Food Stores in 1988. The company planned to purchase Argonaut Group Inc. in 1987, but withdrew from the buyout.

The dissolution of Gibbons Green and the formation of Leonard Green & Partners is attributed by some to the failure of two buyouts: Ohio Mattress Company and Sheller-Globe Corporation.

In 2007, LGP acquired 17% shares of Whole Foods Market in a PIPE investment deal, "one of the best investments in our firm’s history" according to firm manager Jonathan Sokoloff, because it enabled LGP to acquire J.Crew, BJ's Wholesale Club and Jo-Ann Stores with the cash made from Whole Foods.

In 2019, LGP named John Baumer and Evan Hershberg co-heads of the Jade Fund.

In March 2020, partners at LGP committed to plans for a $10 million employee-assistance fund for employees of Leonard Green portfolio companies impacted by the COVID-19 pandemic.

In March 2025, Leonard Green & Partners won PE Hub's Comprehensive Trade of the Year Award for the sale of $18.25 billion in SRS to Home Depot.

== Notable investments ==
Company	Year acquired	Shares	Year divested	Sold to	Sources
Thrifty Payless		43%, owned with Kmart	1996	Rite Aid Corporation	
Leslie's Poolmart	1997				
Petco	2000				
The Container Store	2007				
Whole Foods Market	2009	17% (PIPE investment)	2011: 11 million shares sold (less than half of LGP's stake)		
Jo-Ann Stores	2010				
Prospect Medical Holdings	2010	61.3%	2021		
Shake Shack	2012				
PureGym	2017				
The Shade Store	2018				
WellSky (health tech)	2020	owned with TPG Capital			
Service Logic	2020				

In 2016, LGP closed Green Equity Investors VII, L.P. ("GEI VII"), with $9.6 billion of committed capital. In 2019, LGP raised $14.75 billion for two new funds.

=== Prospect Medical Holdings ===
In April, 2025, Upland, Pa., based Crozer Health, which had previously been acquired by Leonard Green & Partners, was closed down after no buyer could be found, laying off 2,600 employees. The Pennsylvania State Attorney General's office cited Leonard Green's practices as a primary reason for the closure. Specifically, Leonard Green & Partners-controlled Prospect Medical Holdings used a sale-leaseback strategy as well as other business decisions that a U.S. Senate report described as "[saddling] Crozer with unmanageable lease obligations and even higher levels of debt." The Pennsylvania Attorney General sued Prospect in 2024 for breach of contract, alleging that the company "[diverted] more than $450 million to private investors" and "failed to fully fund the pension accounts for Crozer Keystone retirees."

In February 2021, ProPublica reported on a dispute between LGP and Rhode Island's regulators and legislators over LGP's divestment in Prospect Medical Holdings. Approval for LGP's attempted sale of its 60% stake in Prospect to its co-owners was held up by the Rhode Island attorney general, who, given the dire financial situation LGP was leaving the health system in, conditioned its approval on LGP placing $120-150 million in escrow to back up its two fiscally strained hospitals in the state. LGP had in 2018 initiated a dividend recapitalization which landed it and its investors $658.4 million in dividends and management fees, and the next year sold Prospect's real estate in three states to Medical Properties Trust for $1.386 billion, leaving it with long-term lease obligations of $1.3 billion. In response to the AG's conditions, LGP threatened to shut down the hospitals. The pressure of potential loss of healthcare services led the AG to lower the escrow obligation to $80 million while also requiring LGP to commit over $30 million to the system during the transition.
