= Robert G. Miller =

American businessman (born 1944)

Robert "Bob" Miller
- Born: Robert G. Miller; 1944 (age 80–81); Louisville, Mississippi, U.S.
- Occupation: Businessman
- Known for: Former CEO of Fred Meyer, Rite Aid and Albertsons
- Title: Chairman Emeritus of Albertsons Companies
- Successor: Jim Donald
- Spouse: Sharon Miller

Robert G. Miller (born 1944) is an American businessman. He is a Chairman Emeritus of Albertsons Companies.

== Biography ==
Miller was born in 1944 in Louisville, Mississippi. He grew up on his maternal grandfather's farm in Mississippi.

Miller began his career in a grocery store. He eventually served as the chairman and CEO of Fred Meyer. During his time as CEO, he led Fred Meyer through their merger with Kroger, in mid-1999. He then served as vice chairman and chief operating officer at Kroger for a brief time before being appointed as chairman and CEO of Rite Aid Corporation. He held the post of CEO of Rite Aid until 2003 and chairman until June 2007, and was a director until 2011.

Miller is a director of Fred Meyer. He formerly served on the boards of Rite Aid, Harrah's Entertainment, Wild Oats Markets and Caesars Entertainment Corporation. Miller currently serves on the Board of Directors of Albertsons Companies and Jim Pattison Group.

Miller received the Horatio Alger Award in 2012. He was awarded an honorary doctorate from Boise State University in 2018.
