= Lane Drug =

US discount drugstore chain, 1922–1989

Lane Drug Company
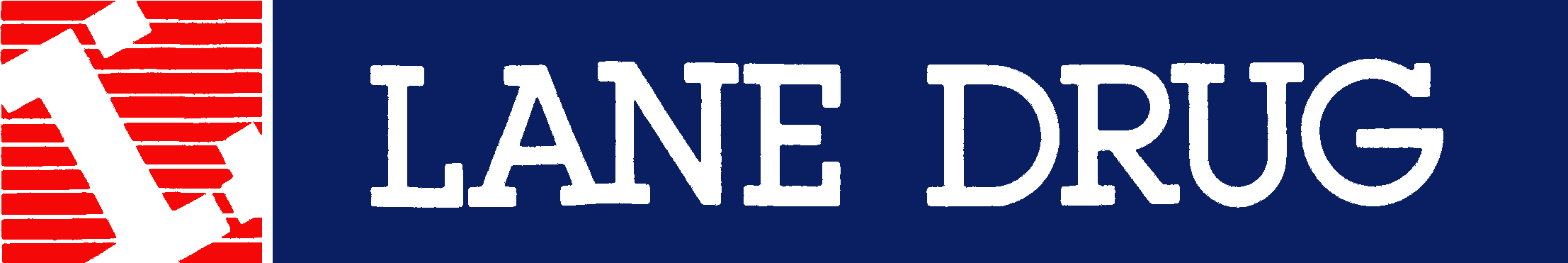
- Company type: Retail / Pharmacy
- Industry: Pharmaceutical
- Founded: Toledo, Ohio (1922)
- Defunct: April 10, 1989
- Fate: Acquired
- Successor: Rite Aid
- Headquarters: Toledo, Ohio, United States
- Area served: Ohio, Pennsylvania, West Virginia, Alabama, and Georgia
- Products: Pharmacy, Liquor, Tobacco, Cosmetics, Health and Beauty Aids, General Merchandise, Convenience Grocery, and Photo

The Lane Drug Company of Ohio (also referred to as "Lane’s Discount Drugs", or "Lane's), was a discount drugstore chain in the United States that was originally based in Toledo, Ohio. On April 10, 1989, the chain was acquired by Rite Aid Corporation of Harrisburg, Pennsylvania, and operated as a division of Rite Aid until late 2024, when Rite Aid closed all but 4 Ohio locations after filing for Chapter 11 bankruptcy protection in October 2023.

== Store locations ==
The first Lane's opened at the corner of Adams and Erie Streets in Downtown Toledo, across from the Lucas County courthouse, in 1922. Clerks would retrieve items for customers from tall shelves accessed by ladders hanging from the ceilings. Stores were added over the next several years, including a location on Summit Street across from the popular Tiedtke's Department Store. In 1938, Lane's opened its first air conditioned superstore on Sylvania Avenue allowing customers the convenience of self-service and a soda fountain.

In 1939 The Lane Drug chain was owned by Cleveland lawyer Sidney Amster (who also owned Molay Shave Cream); at that time the chain consisted of five stores and a warehouse. In that year he offered William Scher to be co-president giving him 49% of the stock if he would go to Toledo, manage the chain, and not invest in any stocks. Scher agreed, and had opened five more stores by 1949. In the early fifties Amster bought out Scher and put his son, Harvey Amster, in charge.

Lane's built a warehouse at Detroit and Dura Avenues in Toledo in 1952, in anticipation of future expansion in the area.

In 1953, Lane's entered South Toledo, opening a store at 1601 Broadway, at the corner of South Avenue, featuring prescriptions, cosmetics, sundries, cigars and tobaccos, hardware, paint, toy and camera departments. At that time the chain employed a total of 350 people.

By 1961, additional locations included Parkway Plaza in Maumee, Ohio, Starr Avenue and Woodville Road in East Toledo, 1320 Dorr, 5233 Dorr, 3411 Monroe, 1028 Sylvania, Swayne Field, and Westgate in West Toledo, and S. Main St. in Bowling Green. In 1968, a 7,000-square-foot (650 m^{2}) store was opened in Rossford, Ohio featuring "lighted glassware displays of the latest merchandising design".

In 1973, a distribution center was opened on Waggoner Blvd. in Toledo.

A Perrysburg, Ohio store opened in 1974, which reported the highest growth rate of any new store in Lane's history. In 1976, a Point Place store was relocated to a larger, 10,000-square-foot (930 m^{2}) location which was to be the prototype of future stores, including departments such as food, bicycle accessories, wicker, and jewelry, as well as a mini-branch of a local savings and loan. Later that year, new stores opened in Sylvania, and at Upton and Bancroft in Toledo. Also operating by this time were stores in Southwyck Mall and Flint, Michigan, although the Flint store was later sold to Perry Drug Stores.

In 1979, a store was opened in Bryan, Ohio with great publicity and ceremony, marking the 400th store in the People's Drug chain. Also that year, Lane's operated 7 full-service optical centers in various stores.

In the 1980s, Lane's operated several "Smiles" stores in the Toledo area, specializing in cards, candy, and gifts. In 1985, Lane's opened two 35,000-square-foot (3,300 m^{2}) "Bud’s Deep Discount Drug Stores" in the Toledo area. The name "Bud’s" was derived from the nickname of Sheldon "Bud" Fantle.

== Ownership and acquisitions ==
In 1938, the six existing Lane's stores were sold to the K-W Drug Company of Cleveland, OH. In 1956, the Amster family of Cleveland sold the company to the A.C. Israel Commodity Company of New York, although the Amster family continued to manage the stores until 1970. In 1970, Lane's established a working relationship with Schuman Drug of Canton, OH. Sheldon Fantle of Schuman's became president of the Lane Drug Co. and moved the base from New York to Toledo. At that time the company operated 106 drug stores in five states, including Ohio, Pennsylvania, West Virginia, Alabama, and Georgia. In 1972, Lane's merged with the 25-store Schuman Drug and Dynamic Discount Drug chain, and purchased a 22% interest in People's Drug of Alexandria, Virginia.

In 1976, Lane's merged with People's Drug Stores. Sheldon Fantle referred to the merger as "the minnow swallowing the whale" since the 250 store-People's chain was purchased by the smaller Lane Drug Co.,

Following the People's Drug acquisition, Sheldon Fantle became president and chief executive officer of Peoples Drug Stores, Inc. and Stephen Schuman became president of Lane's. In 1980 Schuman was named a senior vice president of Peoples Drug, and Jeffrey Fantle, Sheldon's son, became president of Lane's. Sheldon Fantle was also elected chairman of the board of the National Association of Chain Drug Stores, and in 1983, Melvin Wilczynski, Lane's Vice President of Professional Services, was named to a four-year term on the Ohio State Board of Pharmacy. In 1985, A. C. Israel sold the Peoples chain and all subsidiaries, including Lane's, to Imasco, a Canadian firm which was itself a subsidiary of BAT (British American Tobacco). In 1987, Sheldon Fantle retired as head of Peoples, Jeffrey Fantle became senior vice president of Peoples, and George R. Hampu was named president of Lane's.

On April 10, 1989, the 114-unit Lane's chain was purchased by Rite Aid. The Lane Drug Company remained an active subsidiary of Rite Aid (owning locations held by the company at its closure), as shown in the company's October 2023 Chapter 11 bankruptcy filings.

On May 5, 2025, Rite Aid filed for Chapter 11 bankruptcy for the second time in 2 years, listing assets and liabilities between $1 billion and $10 billion. Rite Aid will sell all of its assets as part of its procedure, as it overcomes financial challenges such as debt, increased competition, and inflation, including Lane Drug.

== Labor disputes and legal issues ==
In 1962, Lane's and Walgreens were charged with violations of the Sunday closing laws ("blue laws"). A Toledo Municipal Judge acquitted the two firms.

In spring of 1965, a pharmacist began agitating to unionize Lane's pharmacists. The United States Court of Appeals ultimately ruled that the union had not represented a majority of the pharmacists employed by Lane's at the time, and although it was ruled that bad faith may have existed on the part of Lane's, the pharmacists were never unionized. The same union had unsuccessfully demanded recognition by Lane's as a bargaining unit for some of its clerical employees on January 15, 1954.

In March 1970, the Parkway Plaza store in Maumee was cited by the United States Department of Labor for not meeting minimum wage standards with its 15 employees. No other Lane's locations were cited.

In April 1970, it was announced that the Retail Clerks Union, Local 954, would represent over 200 Lane's retail clerks. The union wanted to represent clerks only in Toledo and the immediate suburbs, while the company also wished the union to represent stores in Bowling Green, Findlay, Fostoria, and Lima. The union (now known as the United Food and Commercial Workers) still represents employees in the Rite Aid "Lane’s" stores.

In 1983, Lane Drug leased 100,000 square feet (9,300 m^{2}) in a facility owned by Willis Day Properties at 5225 Telegraph Road in North Toledo, to store bulk products for distribution to its stores. On July 7, 1985, the warehouse and most of its contents were destroyed by fire. The Commerce and Industry Insurance Company of Cleveland, Lane's insurer, sued the Toledo Fire Department for $3 million for negligence, and in 1994 the city settled the lawsuit for $250,000.

== Advertising and promotion ==
From the beginning in 1922, Lane's operated on a philosophy of low prices and high service, stating "We meet or beat all advertised prices. Nothing in our store is sold at full price…" and offering home delivery.

The 1953, opening of Lanes eleventh outlet at Broadway and South was publicized with a full-page advertisement in the Toledo Blade, offering 10,000 free Hawaiian orchids or free cigars to the first 1,000 men.

In 1971, Lane's ran a full-page ad showcasing personalized service, with a photo of the pharmacists in each of 24 Toledo area stores, their names and alma mater.

In the mid-1970s, Lane's used the slogan "Look to Lane’s" in advertising media. By 1979, Lane's grand openings were spectacles, with festivities including clowns, beauty consultants from major cosmetics companies, beauty queens, college football heroes, Indy cars, free samples, free cigars, fragrances, and balloons, $5 prescription "Medi-Bucks", and local marching bands.

In the mid-1980s, Lane's used the slogan "We’re ready", and advertising showcased services such as the convenience of 52 locations in metropolitan Toledo, professionalism of pharmacists, generic prescription savings, senior citizen discounts, baby club, award-winning health information pamphlets, extended business hours, computerized pharmacy data systems, and 6 optical centers with eye exams available at the Southland location.

In 1988, TV and radio ads ran for Lane's (later using the People's name) featuring Dixie Carter and Annie Potts from the then-popular "Designing Women" television series. The slogan read "Lane (or People’s) Drug: The convenience you want, the savings you deserve." Print ads were run for groups of stores for a "grand reopening" as the stores were remodeled and renamed "People’s Drug".

== Gallery ==
Lane's at Westgate Shopping Center, c. 1960

A typical Lane's store, c. 1965

Lane's 1970's Logo
