= Big Y =

US supermarket chain in Massachusetts and Connecticut

Big Y Foods, Inc.

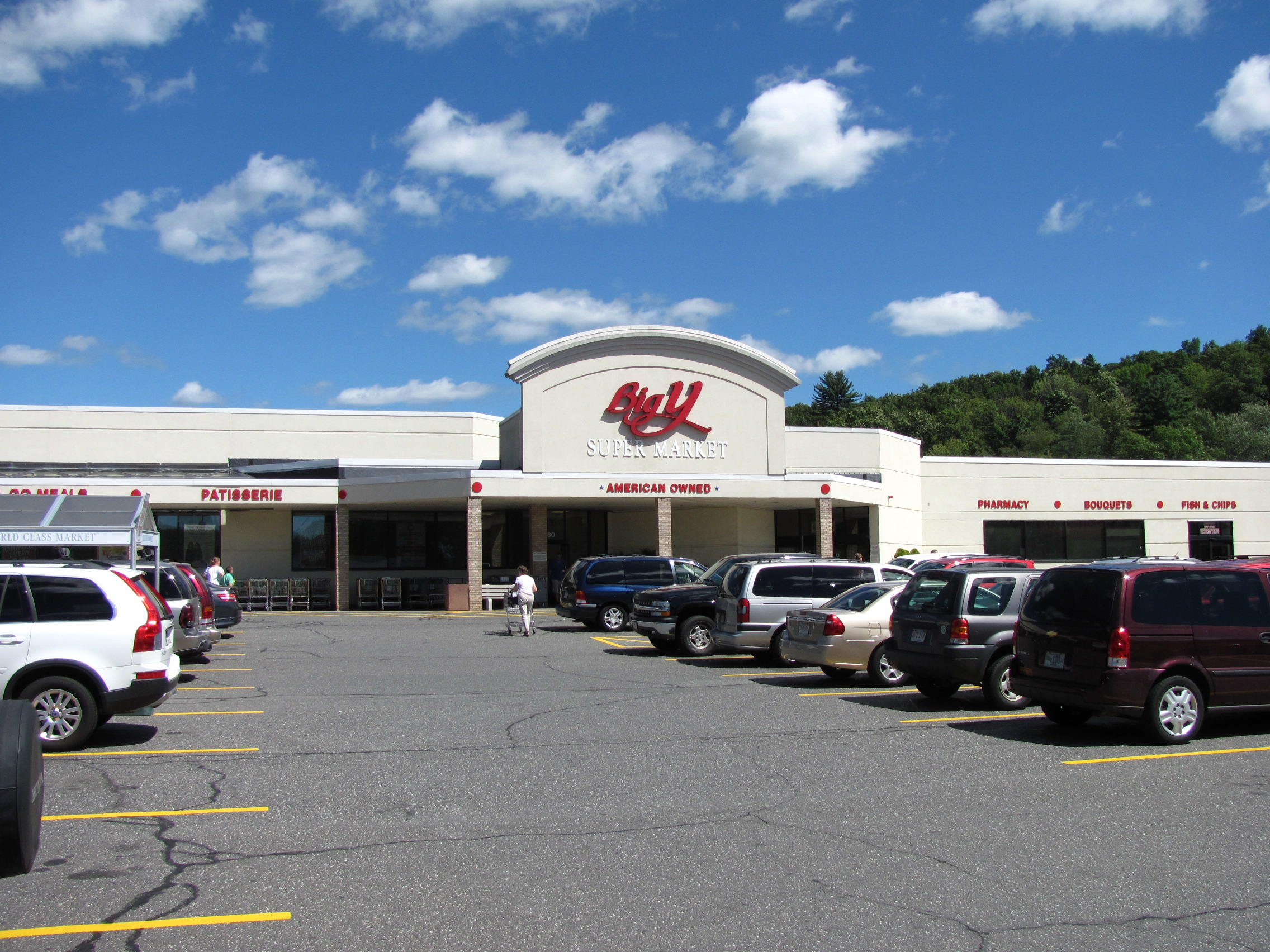
- The Big Y store in Palmer, Massachusetts.
- Formerly: Y Cash Market (1936–1952)
- Type: Private; family business
- Industry: Retail (Grocery)
- Founded: 1936 (90 years ago) in Chicopee, Massachusetts, U.S.
- Founder: Gerald D'Amour; Paul D'Amour
- Headquarters: Springfield, Massachusetts, U.S.
- Number of locations: 79 (2026)
- Area served: Massachusetts; Connecticut
- Key people: Charles D'Amour, Chairman Donald D'Amour, Chairman emeritus Michael D’Amour, President/CEO; Richard Bossie, COO Theresa Jasmine, CFO
- Products: Bakery, delicatessen, dairy, grocery, frozen foods, organic foods, bulk foods, meat, produce, seafood, wine, beer, spirits, floral products, pet supplies, general merchandise
- Revenue: ▲$3.04 billion (2025)
- Owner: D'Amour family (100%)
- Number of employees: 12,000 (2021)
- Website: www.bigy.com

Big Y Foods, Inc. (or Big Y) is an American, family-owned supermarket chain located in Massachusetts and Connecticut. It operates under the trade names Big Y World Class Market or Big Y Supermarket. The company is headquartered in Springfield, Massachusetts, and is currently run by cousins Charles and Michael D'Amour.

Big Y is one of the largest independently owned supermarket chains in New England, and it employs over 12,000 people. In 2021 Big Y was the 210th-largest private company in the United States, according to that year's Forbes magazine "Largest Private Companies" list. Big Y is the fifth largest supermarket chain in New England after Quincy-based Stop & Shop, Scarborough-based Hannaford, West Bridgewater–based Shaw's Supermarkets, and Tewksbury-based Market Basket. Big Y is the second largest in Southern New England after the aforementioned Stop & Shop.

== History ==
In 1936, a young entrepreneur, Paul D'Amour, aided by his brother, Gerald, and sisters, Ann Marie, Yvette, and Gertrude, purchased the Y Cash Market in the Willimansett section of Chicopee, Massachusetts, at the "Y" intersection of Chicopee and Meadow Streets. According to Paul D’Amour on the 50th anniversary, it was in the fall of 1936 that the brothers began Y Cash Market, the forerunner of Big Y.

In July 2016, it was announced that Big Y had entered into a purchase agreement with Ahold and Delhaize Group for eight Hannaford Brothers locations in Massachusetts as part of the divestiture of stores to gain clearance from the Federal Trade Commission for the impending Ahold/Delhaize merger. The new stores, all converted from Hannaford, are located in Kingston, Quincy, Norwell, Milford, Norwood, West Peabody, Saugus, and Easton. The addition of the eight new stores brought Big Y's store count in Massachusetts to 37, and increased its footprint in the state to extend from the Berkshires all the way to Greater Boston.

As of September 2023, Big Y operates 73 supermarkets in Massachusetts and Connecticut; many of which are located in the metropolitan areas of Springfield, Worcester, Greater Boston, and Hartford. In addition to its traditional supermarkets, Big Y owns and operates two specialty markets: Table & Vine, a large specialty liquor and wine store in West Springfield; and the Big Y Express Fresh Market, a smaller, urban market in Downtown Springfield. Big Y also operated two standalone pharmacies in Springfield and Wilbraham before eventually folding them into the pharmacies located in its nearby stores. Between 2013 and 2023, Big Y opened 16 gas stations and convenience stores in Western Massachusetts and Connecticut, under the name Big Y Express. Most Big Y Express stores are located adjacent to, or nearby, a full-size Big Y supermarket.

== Locations and expansion ==
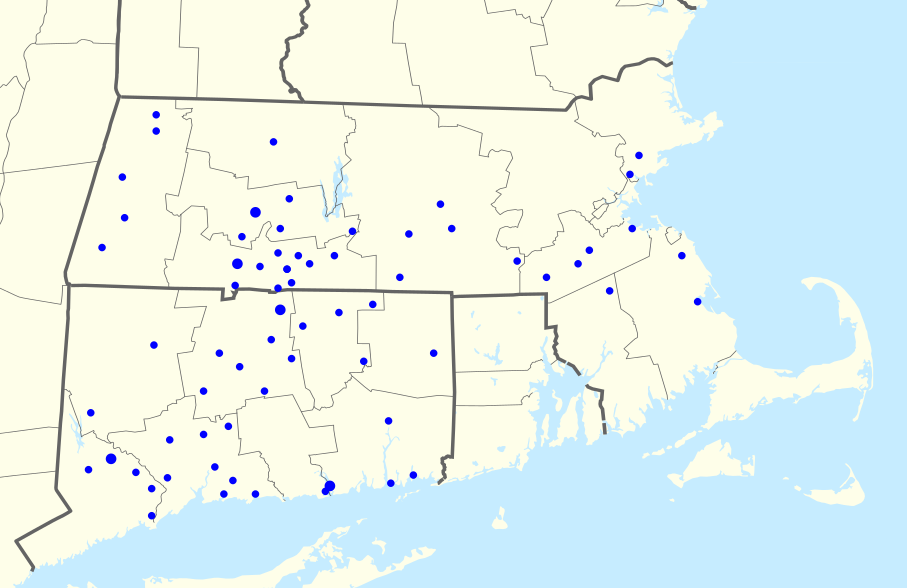
A map of all the locations in Connecticut and Massachusetts

Big Y focuses primarily on opening stores to strengthen its existing footprint, though that footprint is expanding slowly. Most Big Y stores are within a 75-mile (121-kilometer) radius of their Springfield headquarters. In 2010, Big Y announced that its new store plans included Lee, Franklin, and Milford, Massachusetts; according to its website, each town would have a store by 2012. The Lee store opened in November 2011, adding to Big Y's presence in the Berkshires; while the Franklin store opened in August 2012. The Franklin store is a sister location to Big Y's store in Walpole; those two had been Big Y's only stores in Greater Boston until 2016. Big Y also announced new stores in Foxborough and Holyoke, but plans for those locations were ultimately withdrawn. The original Milford plans also never came to fruition, but after the previously mentioned buyout of eight Hannaford stores, Big Y now operates the former Hannaford stores in Milford, Norwell, Kingston, Easton, and Norwood.

In 2016, Big Y opened a Connecticut store in Shelton, bringing their store count in that state to 33. Big Y has also occasionally grown through acquisitions. In addition to the previously mentioned acquisition of eight former Hannaford stores, in late 2010 Big Y purchased seven stores from A&P, which was leaving central Connecticut. Four of these stores (Branford, Mystic, Old Lyme, and West Hartford) were renovated and re-opened as Big Y World Class Markets within a short period of time.

As of June 2026, the company operated 79 locations.

On November 7, 2019, Big Y opened two new store locations in Milford, Connecticut and Derby, Connecticut.

On March 7, 2022, Big Y announced plans to open locations in Uxbridge and Pembroke. The Uxbridge location opened in October 2025, while the opening of the Pembroke location would be set back due to zoning related issues.

In January 2024, Big Y announced it had taken over the leases of three never opened Amazon Fresh stores after the latter company reversed it decision to expand into Massachusetts and Connecticut. The three new locations are Brookfield and Westport, Connecticut and Westborough, Massachusetts. The Brookfield store opened in Spring 2024 and the Westport store opened in Fall 2024. The Westborough store opened in Summer 2025.

In June 2024, Big Y opened a newly built store in Middletown.

In January 2026, Big Y announced four new locations in Pembroke, Saugus, Fairhaven, and Dartmouth. The Saugus location was previously home to a Big Y store, which closed to make way for Amazon Fresh, but Big Y was able to move back in after those plans fell through. The former two locations are planned to open on September 10,2026, while the latter two are planned to open in spring 2027.

Big Y's largest competitor throughout its trade area is Stop & Shop, based out of Quincy, and to a lesser extent Big Y also competes with Boston-based Shaw's and Schenectady, New York's Price Chopper supermarkets. In Connecticut, Big Y is now the second-largest supermarket chain by number of locations, with only Stop & Shop operating more Connecticut stores.

== Operations ==
Business	Service	Locations	Date	Notes
Big Y	Supermarket	79	1936–present	Founded in 1936 as Y Cash Market
Table & Vine	Large specialty liquor and wine store	1	2002–present	Also in select Big Y Supermarkets
Big Y Express	Gas station	17	2012–present	
Big Y Express Fresh Market	Urban Small Format Supermarket	1	2023–present	
