= Hannaford (supermarket) =

American supermarket chain

Hannaford Bros. Co., LLC.
- Trade name: Hannaford
- Type: Subsidiary
- Industry: Retail grocery store
- Founded: 1883 (143 years ago) in Portland, Maine, U.S.
- Founder: Arthur Hannaford
- Headquarters: Scarborough, Maine, U.S.
- Number of locations: 189 (2024)
- Area served: Maine, New Hampshire, Vermont, Massachusetts and Eastern Upstate New York
- Key people: Michael Vail, President
- Products: Bakery, dairy, deli, floral, frozen foods, grocery, liquor, meat, pharmacy, produce, seafood, snacks, sushi, meal solutions, pet, baby, home needs, healthy & beauty care, special occasions.
- Parent: Ahold Delhaize
- Website: www.hannaford.com

Hannaford is an American supermarket chain based in Scarborough, Maine. Founded in Portland, Maine, in 1883, Hannaford operates stores in New England and New York. The chain is part of the Ahold Delhaize group based in the Netherlands, and is a sister company to formerly competing New England supermarket chain Stop & Shop.

== History ==
=== Beginnings ===
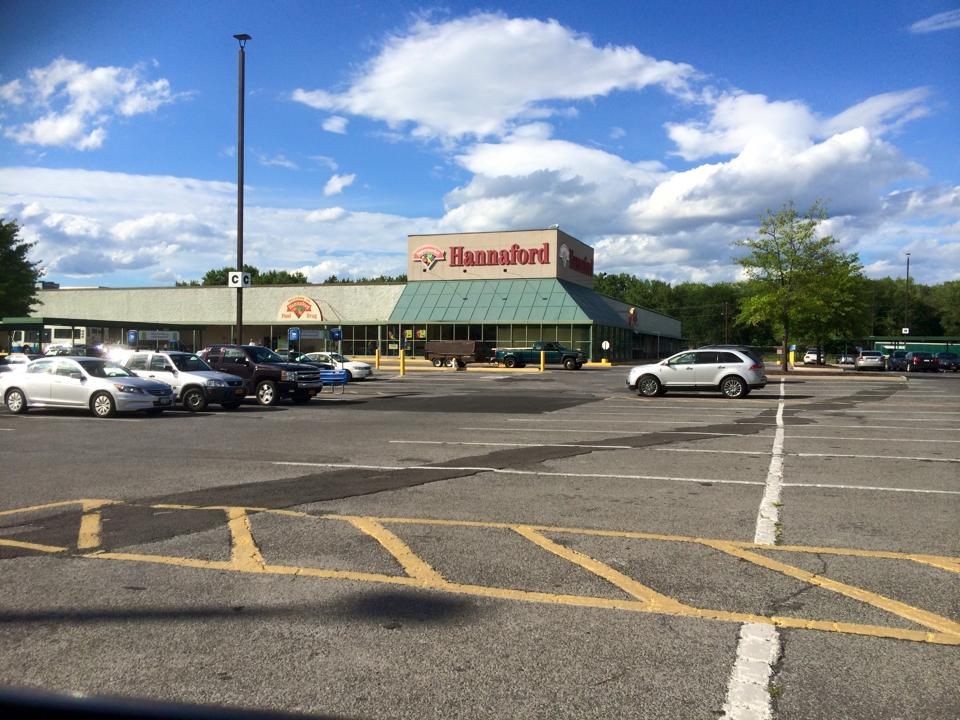
Kingston Plaza Location In Kingston, New York. This location was formerly a Grand Union.

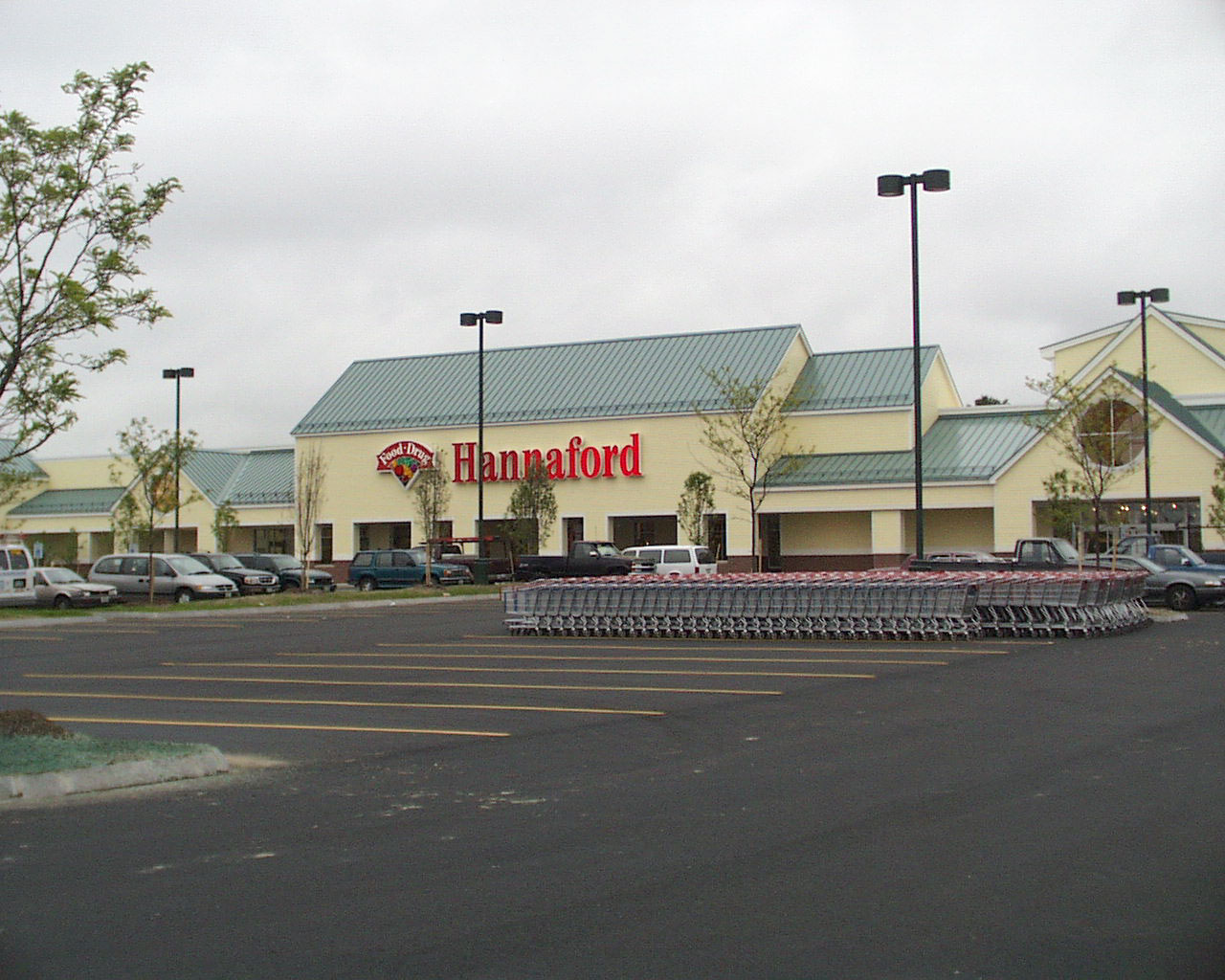
Falmouth, ME Hannaford

Hannaford was founded in 1883 by Arthur Hannaford as a small produce store along the Portland, Maine waterfront. In 1915, its location was 164–168 Commercial Street, a site now occupied by a Gorham Savings Bank. The company's warehouse was at today's 25 Market Street.

Arthur was joined in 1902 by his brothers, Howard and Edward, and they incorporated Hannaford Bros. Co. By 1920, the company became a leading produce wholesaler in northern New England. Hannaford then relocated to a new five-story warehouse on Cross Street. In 1939, with the purchase of Tondreau Supermarkets Inc., sponsor of Red & White stores in Maine, Hannaford expanded into the wholesale grocery business. Late in 1944, Hannaford Co. opened its first retail outlet under an equity partnership arrangement with Adjutor Tondreau.

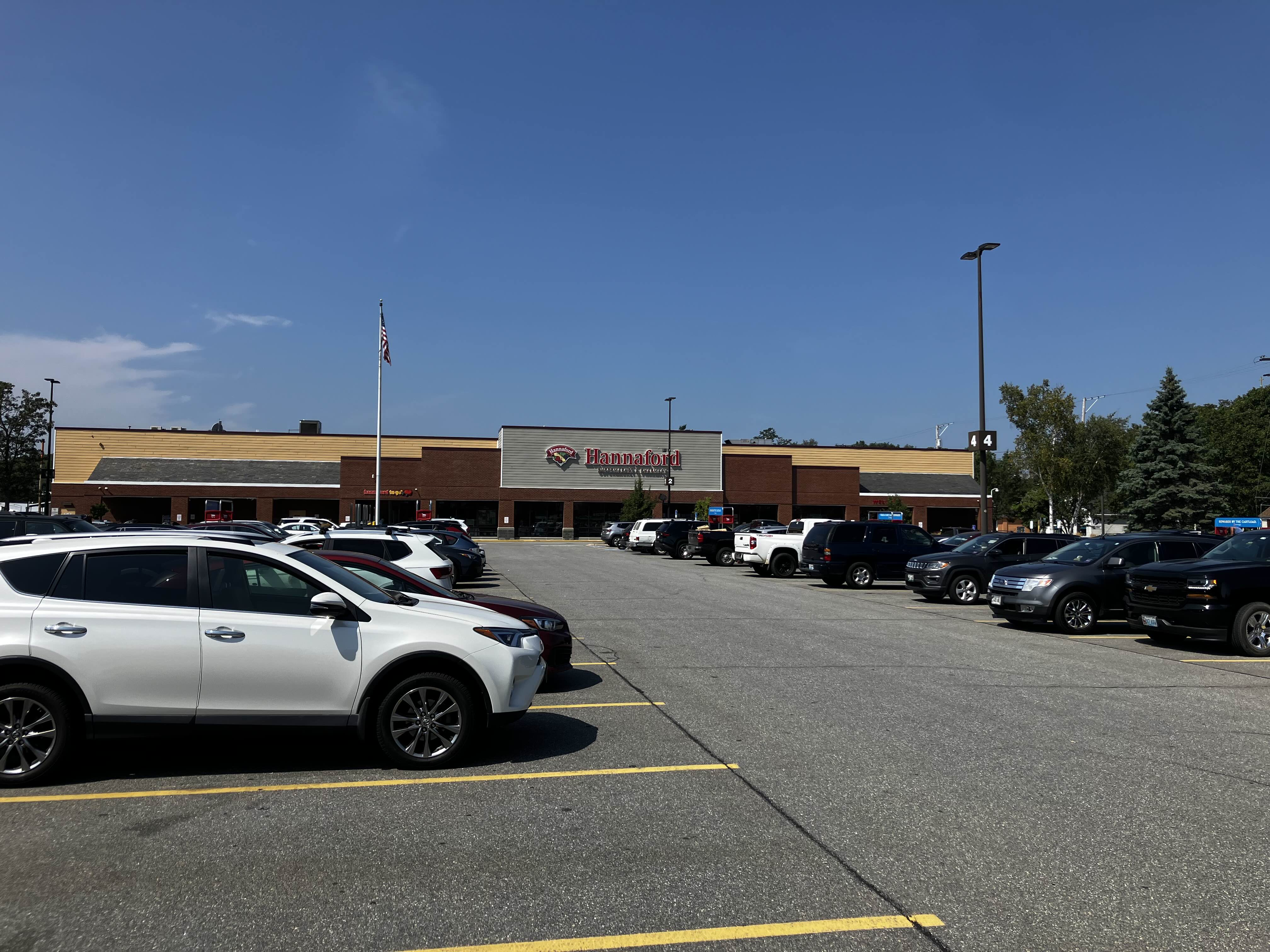
Downtown Brunswick, ME Hannaford

By 1960, Hannaford Bros. had constructed a 200,000-square-foot (19,000 m^{2}) distribution center in South Portland, Maine, to better service more retail stores. With the purchase of 31 Sampson's grocery stores in 1966 as well as the 1967 purchase of Progressive Distributors, Hannaford expanded its retail presence. By 1971, the company's earnings topped $1 million.

=== Expansion ===
Hannaford continued to rapidly expand throughout the 1970s and 1980s by opening a chain of Wellby Drug Stores, many of which were incorporated into Shop ’N’ Save retail stores. By 1987 the company had spread into New York and Massachusetts; that same year sales hit $1 billion.

In 1994, Hannaford began an expansion into the Southeast by purchasing a small Southeastern North Carolina supermarket chain, Wilson's Supermarkets, for $120 million. This acquisition served as the foundation of an expansion of Hannaford stores into the Carolinas and Virginia.

=== Acquisition by Delhaize ===
In 2000, Delhaize America bought Hannaford; the purchase both eliminated an emerging competitor to its Food Lion chain in the Southeast and expanded Delhaize operations into the Northeast.

In order to win regulatory approval for the acquisition, Hannaford divested 38 stores in North Carolina and Virginia. Regulators were concerned about the impact the acquisition would have on competition in the southeast, as Delhaize already had a significant presence in the region with the Food Lion chain. Hannaford sold 12 North Carolina stores to Lowes Foods and five to Sylvester/Floyd Group, an operator of Piggly Wiggly stores. In Virginia, 20 stores were sold to national chain Kroger. Hannaford also closed 13 stores in North Carolina, primarily in the Charlotte area. The Federal Trade Commission approved the deal in July 2000 and the acquisition was completed in August.

The Hannaford name first took over from Shop 'N' Save on private labels in 1996. Five years later, stores in most of Maine, New Hampshire, Massachusetts, and Vermont assumed the name. As of 2006, only a small number of locations continue to use the Shop ’n’ Save banner. Independently owned and operated franchises receiving merchandise through Hannaford's wholesale distribution continue to use the Shop ’n’ Save name, mainly in smaller communities. In 2001, five Grand Union stores in New York were purchased and converted into Hannaford stores. In 2004, 19 Victory Supermarkets in Massachusetts and New Hampshire also were purchased and converted to Hannaford stores.

In 2006, Hannaford Supermarkets launched Guiding Stars, the first storewide nutrition navigation program. The concept of Guiding Stars was born from extensive consumer research that revealed a desire to live healthier lifestyles, but showed confusion understanding the volume and complexity of the nutrition-related information available in the media, advertisements and on food packaging. The rankings are based on U.S. Department of Agriculture guidelines.

In 2007, 4.2 million Hannaford customer credit card numbers were exposed as a result of a data breach perpetrated by a Russian/Ukrainian hacker group.

On March 17, 2008, The Boston Globe reported that the company's credit-card processing servers had been compromised for three months. Some 4.2 million credit card numbers were stolen, at least 1,800 of which had been used fraudulently. In August 2009, criminal computer hacker Albert Gonzalez was indicted for the crime.

Delhaize America previously operated 104 Sweetbay Supermarket locations in Florida, which were modeled after Hannaford and sold Hannaford brand products. These stores were sold by the parent company in 2013 to Southeastern Grocers and were converted to Winn-Dixie locations. In 2016, Hannaford’s parent company Delhaize merged with Ahold to create a new company, Ahold Delhaize. Ahold was the owner of the competing New England–based Stop & Shop supermarkets, which become a sister company and brand to Hannaford as a result of the merger with Delhaize. Hannaford now sells Nature’s Promise private-label products which were originally only available at Stop & Shop.

Through the process of the merger, the Federal Trade Commission required 10 Hannaford stores to be divested to other retailers. Eight stores in eastern Massachusetts were sold to Big Y and two stores in the lower Hudson Valley in New York were sold to Tops Friendly Markets.

Hannaford has faced criticism regarding its commitment to sourcing 100% cage-free eggs. In March 2016, Hannaford Supermarkets publicly pledged to transition its entire shell egg assortment to cage-free by 2025, emphasizing its commitment to sustainability and animal welfare. However, the company later deferred this deadline to 2032, a seven-year extension. This decision has drawn public criticism from animal advocacy organizations, including Mercy For Animals, which launched campaigns directly calling on Hannaford to take urgent action on its nearly decade-old cage-free commitment. Local residents and news outlets in Portland, Maine, Hannaford’s primary market, have highlighted the company’s backtracking, expressing concern over the prolonged confinement of hens and the perceived broken promise to customers.

== Locations ==
Hannaford Supermarkets are found in Maine (which has the largest number of its stores), New Hampshire, Vermont, Massachusetts, and New York (primarily eastern Upstate in the Capital District, the Mohawk Valley, the Hudson Valley and the North Country).

Until 2011, the company regularly marketed numerous products under its own private labels—including products by Richelieu Foods. The company used the Delhaize-standard Home 360 brand from 2011 to 2014 but has now returned to using simply the "Hannaford" brand name as well as the name Taste of Inspirations.

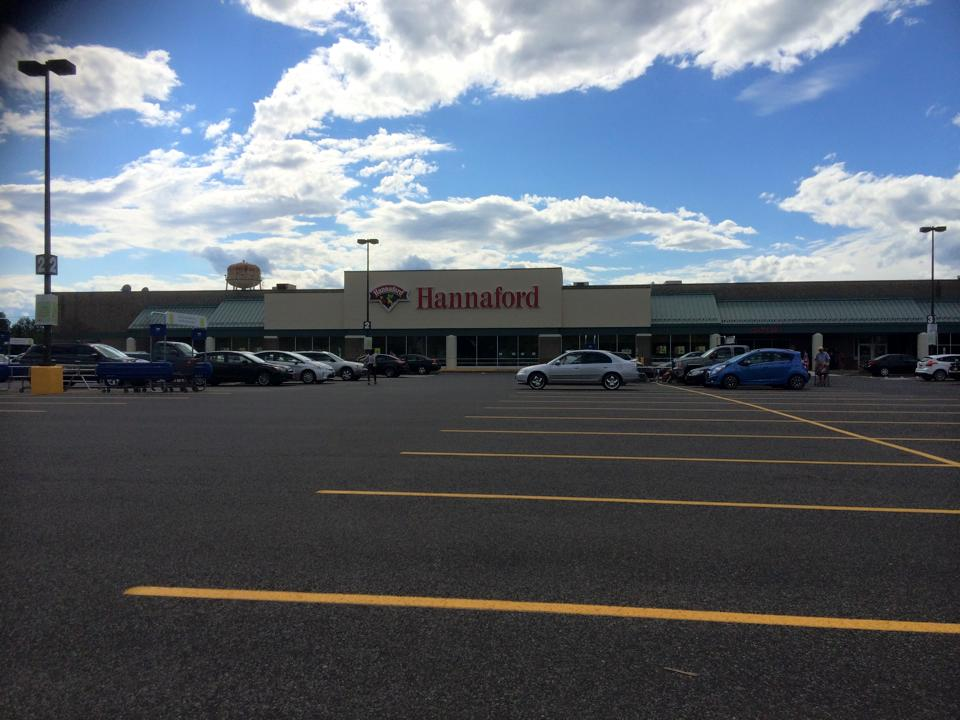
Ulster, NY location

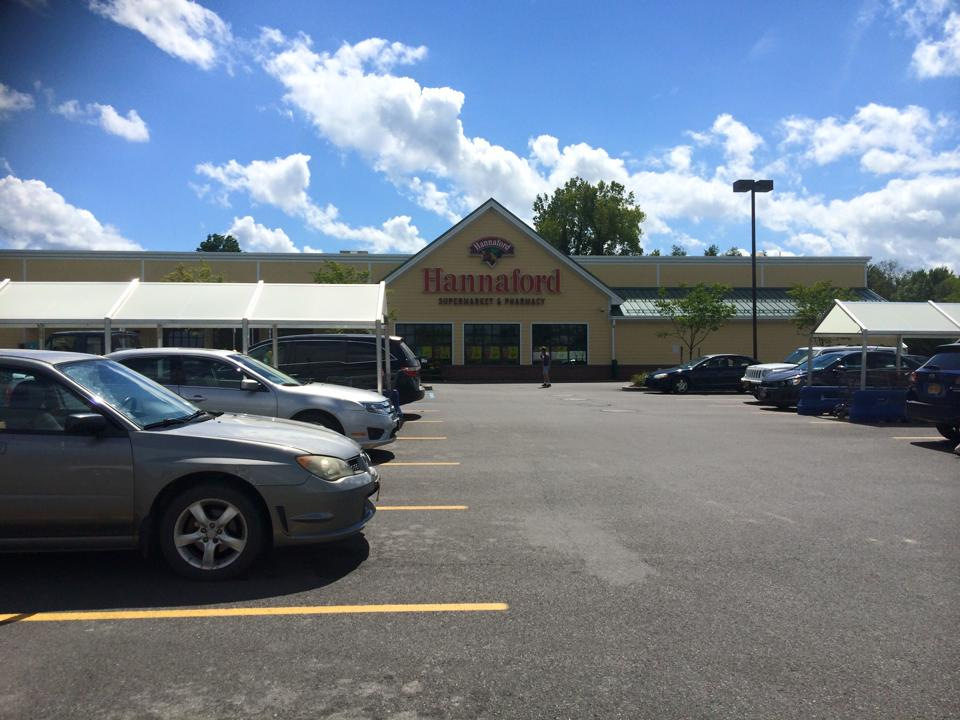
Livingston, NY location

== See also ==
- Stop & Shop, another Ahold Delhaize–owned grocery store which operates in New England
