= List of defunct department stores of the United States =

This is a list of defunct department stores of the United States, from small-town one-unit stores to mega-chains, which have disappeared over the past 100 years. Many closed, while others were sold or merged with other department stores.

== Department stores ==
=== Discount stores ===
These stores closed due to changes in shopping places and patterns, and/or large debt from mergers and acquisitions.

=== National and regional ===
- 99¢ Only Stores
- Acorn Stores (Minneapolis, Minnesota)
- Ames Department Stores Inc. (based in Rocky Hill, Connecticut)
- Arlan's Department Store (Mid-Atlantic and Midwest)
- Ayr-Way (Midwest/Great Lakes States–Based out of Indianapolis) Was discount chain of L.S. Ayres & Co. that eventually became Target Stores.
- L.S. Ayres (Indianapolis-Midwest/ Great Lakes states) Was eventually sold to May Department Stores and finally became Macy's.
- Bargain Hunt (La Vergne, Tennessee) On January 31, 2025, Bargain Hunt's parent company, Essex Technology Group, warned that they were preparing to file for Chapter 11 bankruptcy as soon as the following week. On February 1, 2025, after it was reported that the company shut its only distribution center, Bargain Hunt announced that they would be closing all 91 stores, with liquidation sales beginning shortly after. Bargain Hunt filed for Chapter 11 bankruptcy on February 3, 2025, listing assets between $50 million to $100 million and liabilities between $100 million to $500 million. Up to 300+ employees lost their jobs after Bargain Hunt closed. The stores closed in March 2025.
- Bob's Stores, 24 stores, (Connecticut, Massachusetts, New Hampshire, New York, Rhode Island)
- The Bon-Ton and its subsidiaries: Bergner's, Boston Store (Wisconsin), Carson's, Elder-Beerman, Herberger's and Younkers.
- Bradlees (based in Boston, Massachusetts) (New England, Mid-Atlantic)
- Britt's Department Store (national)
- Edgar Department Stores, Later changed to Almy’s then bought by Bradlees.
- E. J. Korvette (East Coast and Midwest) last stores were closed in 1980 after filing for bankruptcy
- Fisher's Big Wheel (Northeast & Midwest) Discount Department Stores based out of metro Pittsburgh, PA.
- Fortunoff (New York & New Jersey) Department store
- Fred's (Southeast)
- Gamble-Skogmo
- G. E. M. Membership Department Stores (national/Ontario, Canada; also known as G.E.X. and G.E.S.)
- Gibson's Discount Center, based in Texas but had spread to many other states at its peak
- W. T. Grant
- Goody's (store)
- Hills Department Stores Was bought out by Ames Department Stores.
- Howard Brothers Discount Stores
- Jack's (operated by Penn-Daniels and based in Quincy, Illinois with locations in Illinois, Iowa, and Missouri)
- Jamesway (Mid-Atlantic)
- S.H. Kress & Co., Puerto Rico subsidiary Tiendas Kress survived parent company until its remaining locations closed in 2022.
- Leggett (Mid-Atlantic), acquired by Belk in 1997
- Lord & Taylor, the oldest department store chain in the United States, founded in 1826 in New York City, filed for Chapter 11 bankruptcy on August 2, 2020. On August 27, 2020, the company stated it would be liquidating all 38 locations by December 1, 2020.
- McCrory Stores (national)
- Mervyn's (primarily western U.S. but also in a few midwestern and southern U.S. states)
- Montgomery Ward (national – Chicago)
- Neisner's
- Odd Job Stores, Inc. (located in the northeast and midwestern U.S.), acquired by Amazing Savings in 2003 and went bankrupt in 2005
- Peebles- its parent company Stage Stores would file for Chapter 11 bankruptcy and close all of its other stores including Gordmans, Palais Royal, Bealls (Texas), and Goody's.
- P.N. Hirsch, acquired by International Shoe Company (later renamed Interco) in 1964; later sold to Dollar General in 1983 and rebranded
- Schultz's Family Stores, began as Schultz Bros. Co., headquartered in Lake Zurich, Illinois, 77 total stores in 1974 in the Upper Midwest, bankrupt and acquired by Prange Way in 1989
- Shoppers Fair
- Steve & Barry's
- Syms
- Topps stores were closed when parent company, Interstate Stores filed for bankruptcy in 1974
- Tuesday Morning (Nationwide)
- TurnStyle
- Two Guys (Mid-Atlantic)
- Value City
- Venture Stores (Midwest) Based out of St Louis, MO metro area.
- Woolco, founded by the F.W. Woolworth Company as a full-line discount department store
- F. W. Woolworth Company
- Zayre (New England, Mid-Atlantic, Chicago, Florida, Georgia)

=== Alabama ===
- Gayfer's (Mobile)
- Loveman's (Birmingham)
- Mazer's (Birmingham) Opened in 1932, closed in 2011.
- Parisian (Birmingham), sold to Belk 2006, renamed September 2007. Five stores sold to The Bon-Ton, converted to the Carson Pirie Scott name.
- Pizitz (Birmingham), 13-store Alabama chain, sold to McRae's 1987, renamed later that year
- Rogers (Florence) Became a division of Dunlap's that closed in 2007 after sale of store chain by Rogers family.

=== Alaska ===
- Northern Commercial (Anchorage, Fairbanks, Kenai)

=== Arizona ===
- Babbit's (Flagstaff)
- Broadway Southwest (Mesa)
- Diamond's (Phoenix, Tucson, Albuquerque, Denver and Las Vegas), was part of Dayton Hudson
- Goldwater's (Phoenix)
- Goldwyn's (Tucson)
- Levy's (Tucson)
- Myerson's White House (Tucson)
- Sacanni's (Tucson)
- Yellow Front Stores

=== Arkansas ===
- MM Cohn (Little Rock), 2007

=== California ===
- The Akron (Los Angeles), a Southern California–based "eclectic" department store chain that had specialized in carrying imported goods and unusual items such as parking meters and live Mexican monkeys, and which had stores as far north as San Francisco and far south as San Diego before it was forced to close its stores in 1985
- Blackstone's Department Store
- Blum's (San Jose), originally M. Blum & Co., established 1907; store appears to have closed shortly after death of owner and founder in 1940
- The Bon Marché (Los Angeles) (Le Sage Brothers Co.), 430–434 Broadway, Los Angeles, opened in 1907, closed within a year
- Boston Stores (California), HQ in Inglewood and later Carson; liquidated 1989
- The Broadway (Los Angeles), converted to Macy's
- Brock's (Bakersfield), started in 1924 and sold to Gottschalks in 1987
- Breuner's
- Buffums
- Bullock's (Los Angeles), converted to Macy's
- Bullocks Wilshire (Los Angeles) today it is Southwestern University School of Law.
- Butler Brothers (California)
- Carithers's (Petaluma), closed in 1986
- H.C. Capwell Co. (Oakland), merged with Emporium in 1929 to form the Emporium Capwell Co. holding company, Emporium-Capwell was acquired by Broadway-Hale Stores in 1970, Broadway-Hale Stores later became Carter Hawley Hale Stores and then Broadway Stores, Inc.; during this time, Capwell kept its name until 1979
- City of Paris Dry Goods Co. (San Francisco), became City of Paris by Liberty House. Demolished except the rotunda, now part of Neiman Marcus.
- City of Paris (Los Angeles), no relation to the San Francisco store or to Ville de Paris (Los Angeles), 1850s–1897
- Coulter's
- Crowley's (Vallejo)
- Daly's (Eureka), closed in 1995, with four Northern California stores, after operating for exactly 100 years
- Desmond's, founded 1862, became a large Southland-wide chain, closed 1970s
- Disco Department Stores (San Rafael), chain of discount stores located in Northern California and Northern Nevada, first store was opened in San Rafael in 1956 as Marin Associated Consumers by co-founder William L. Simmons, stores were later renamed MAC Disco Mart and then MAC Disco Discount Department Stores, chain sold to Daylin in 1966 and renamed Disco Discount Department Stores, first store outside of Northern California opened in Reno in 1968, stores were closed by 1975 due to financial problems with parent company
- B. H. Dyas
- Eastern-Columbia Department Store, Eastern Outfitters, Columbia Outfitters, San Francisco/Los Angeles through the 1950s
- Fedco, a membership retailer, not subject to "Fair Trade pricing"
- FedMart, a membership retailer, not subject to "Fair Trade pricing"
- Fedway (Los Angeles) – first store in this division opened (in Texas) in 1952 by Federated Department Stores; Westwood store (first in California) opened in 1953; all stores closed and sold off in 1968
- Fifth Street Store: Walker's (Los Angeles, Long Beach, San Diego), main store in downtown Los Angeles was also known as the Fifth Street Store since it was located at the corner of Fifth and Broadway, main store was founded in 1905 as Steele, Faris, Walker Co., later became Muse, Faris, Walker Co., and then finally Walker Inc. in 1924; opened first branch store in Long Beach in the late 1920s; opened a branch store in San Diego in 1935; San Diego store separated in the early 1950s; opened second Long Beach store in 1954; closed Los Angeles store; sold Long Beach stores in 1960 and store renamed
- Frink's (Pasadena), founded by Jose and Lola Frink in the early twentieth century, but closed by mid-century
- Gemco
- Globe Department Store, South Broadway between 51st–52nd, South Los Angeles (1920s–1930s)
- Gottschalks, bankrupt March 31, 2009, which closed all of the stores. A few former Gottschalks stores were replaced as Macy's and Forever 21 in the Pacific region. There were plans to reopen stores in Auburn, Clovis and Oakhurst in spring 2011, but the deal ultimately fell through.
- GET (Government Employees Together) at Lakeshore Plaza, on Sloat Boulevard, in San Francisco, a discount chain, a membership retailer, not subject to "Fair Trade pricing", and open only to employees of local, state, and federal government agencies. Lakeshore Plaza had a Lucky store and in the late 1960s, Government Employees Together became part of Lucky store's Gemco.
- Grodin's (San Francisco Bay Area), a 36-unit chain of men's and women's specialty stores, closed in January 1987.
- Haggarty's, Los Angeles–based chain of junior department stores for apparel, 1906–1970
- Hale's (Hale Brothers) (Sacramento San Francisco), merged with Broadway in 1970 to form the Broadway-Hale holding company while keeping its name on its stores; merged into The Emporium under Carter, Hawley & Hale.
- A. Hamburger & Sons (Los Angeles), founded in 1881, purchased by May Co. 1923 and renamed May Company California
- Harris Department Store, based in San Bernardino, absorbed by Gottschalks
- Harris & Frank
- Hart's Department Store (San Jose)
- Henshey's (Santa Monica), finally closed in 1992 after being in business since 1925
- Hilson's (Martinez), three locations closed 2001
- Hink's (Berkeley), also known as J.F. Hink & Son, closed in 1985Arcadia Publishing
- Hinshaw's (Arcadia and Whittier), both stores were closed in 1992
- Kahn's (Oakland), founded by Israel Kahn in 1879, acquired by newly formed B. F. Schlesinger & Sons in 1925, B.F. Schlesinger & Sons was renamed Western Department Stores in 1941, Kahn was rebranded Rhodes in 1960
- S. Lazard & Co.
- Levee's (Vallejo), closed in the early 1980s
- Liberty House (became Macy's)
- H. Liebes (San Francisco), liquidated when its parent company, Beck Industries, filed for bankruptcy in 1970
- I. Magnin (San Francisco), converted to Macy's
- Joseph Magnin Co., closed 1984
- Marston's San Diego, 3 branches, purchased by The Broadway in the 1960s
- Mattei Bros. (Petaluma) – closed in 1995
- May Company (Los Angeles), merged with Robinsons and became Robinsons-May, then Macy's
- Mervyn's of California, operated stores in western US. Went bankrupt December 2008
- Milliron's, see Fifth Street Store, above
- Nahas, 1953–early 1980s junior department stores with clothing and home goods, mostly in Los Angeles County. Purchased and absorbed independent department stores Rathbun's North Hollywood, Trenwiths Santa Barbara and Butler Bros. Van Nuys.
- F. C. Nash & Co. – Nash's (Pasadena), at one time had 5 stores in downtown locations in neighboring small cities during the 1950s and 1960s, founded in 1889 as a grocery store, became a department store in 1921, branch stores were unable to compete with larger chains opening in malls built in the late 1960s and early 1970s and had to be closed, main store destroyed in a daytime fire on May 11, 1976
- National Stores (Los Angeles)
- O'Connor, Moffat & Co., purchased by Macy's 1945, name changed to Macy's 1947
- Phelps-Terkel junior department store for apparel, founded 1923, survived in various forms until 1992
- Pic 'N' Save, became MacFrugal's, then Big Lots
- Prager's (San Francisco), closed in 1921 after 25 years in business
- Rankin's, Downtown Santa Ana and Orangefair Center, Fullerton
- Ransohoff's, (San Francisco and Sacramento) Ransohoff's, Inc., founded in 1902, by Leopold Ransohoff. Ransohoff's was featured in Alfred Hitchcock's classic 1958 film, Vertigo, set largely in San Francisco.
- Rhodes (Sacramento and Central Valley), became Liberty House
- Robert's, based in Long Beach, which grew to nine stores before closing in the 1990s
- J.W. Robinson (Los Angeles), converted to Robinsons, then merged with May Company to become Robinsons-May, then eventually became Macy's
- Rosenberg's (Santa Rosa), located on Third Street; closed in 1998; now a Barnes & Noble
- Sage's Complete Shopping, one of the first full department stores that coined the name "super market," at Baseline and E Street in San Bernardino, later with stores in Riverside, Rialto, Colton and Redlands, confounded by Milton Ross Sage and C. C. Jenkins, 1937–1973
- Silverwoods
- Swelldom, junior department stores for apparel, Los Angeles, 1906–1970s
- Two Guys
- Unimart (Los Angeles, San Diego), locations variously became Two Guys, Gemco, FedMart; was owned by Food Giant Markets Inc until it merged in 1967 with Vornado, the owner of Two Guys, which quickly converted Unimart stores to Two Guys.
- Ville de Paris, Los Angeles 1893–1919
- Walker's, see Fifth Street Store (original Los Angeles store, from which Walker's Long Beach spun off) and Walker Scott (San Diego spinoff).
- Walker's (Long Beach)
- Walker Scott (San Diego), Solana Beach branch is now a HomeGoods store; founded as a branch of the Walker's Department Store of Los Angeles in 1935; close Walker associate George Scott became president in 1951 following death of Eliza Walker, widow of the deceased founder, in 1951; name of store changed to Walker-Scott in 1955; downtown store closed in 1984; all stores closed by 1986
- Webb's
- Weinstein's (1041 Market Street San Francisco), founded by Isidor Weinstein, went bankrupt in 1968
- Weinstock's (Sacramento), founded in 1874 as the One-Price Store by David Lubin and his half brother Harris Weinstein, renamed Mechanics' Store the following year, later renamed The Weinstock Lubin Company, acquired by Hale Bros. 1949, eventually acquired by Federated in 1995 via various mergers of its parent company, stores eventually rebranded Macy's
- White Front
- The White House (San Francisco), closed in 1965
- Whole Earth Access (Berkeley), last stores closed in 1998
- Wineman's (HQ in Ventura, Oxnard, then Huntington Park)
- Zody's (Los Angeles), bankrupt and locations were sold to Ralphs Grocery Stores in 1986

=== Colorado ===
- Broadway Southwest (Denver)
- The Denver Dry Goods Company, locations throughout the Front Range & Denver Metro
- Joslins (Denver), converted to Dillard's in 1998
- May D&F, with some of its stores purchased by Broadway Southwest
- Fashion Bar

=== Connecticut ===
- Ames Department Stores Inc. (Rocky Hill)
- Arlan's Department Store (Waterbury)
- Caldor (Norwalk)
- The Edw. Malley Co., formerly the largest hometown department store in Downtown New Haven Store relocated during urban renewal in 1962 from Chapel Street to Church Street. Bankruptcy and closure, 1981.
- E.J. Korvettes (Downtown Hartford)
- Feinson's (Danbury), closed 2000
- G. Fox & Co. (Hartford), (Downtown Hartford) flagship closed and all branches merged into Filene's 1993, and most converted to Macy's 2006
- Grant's (central Connecticut, Stamford)
- Read's Department Stores (D.M. Read) (Bridgeport), merged into Jordan Marsh
- Shartenberg's Department Store (1915–1962), Downtown New Haven. Razed in 1964 as part of Mayor Richard C. Lee's redevelopment plans.
- Two Guys (Newington)
- Shoppers Fair

=== Delaware ===
- Almart
- Ames
- Bradlee's
- Caldor
- Hess's (Blue Hen Mall Dover, DE, and Seaford, DE)
- John Wanamaker or Wanamaker's (Wilmington and suburbs), sold to Carter Hawley Hale in 1979, then Washington, DC–based Woodward & Lothrop owned by Alfred Taubman; sold to May Company in 1995; merged with Federated Department Stores in 2005 (now known as Macy's, Inc.)
- Montgomery Ward
- Mullin's, sold to Bamberger's, known as Bamberger's and Mullin's
- Newark Department Store
- Service Merchandise
- Strawbridge and Clothier
- Value City
- Wilmington Dry Goods

=== District of Columbia ===
- Garfinckel's
- Hecht's, converted to Macy's 2006
- Jelleff's
- S. Kann Sons Co.
- Lansburgh's
- Palais Royal, acquired by Woodward & Lothrop 1946
- Raleigh Haberdasher, operated originally as a haberdasher; expanded in later years to family fashions. Acquired by Hartmarx Corp. before closing.
- Woodward & Lothrop, bankrupt and closed 1995 after briefly acquiring and operating John Wanamaker & Company (Philadelphia)

=== Florida ===
- Brown's Department Stores (Dania Beach, Hollywood, Pompano Beach)
- Burdines (Miami), merged with Macy's in 2005
- Cohen Brothers (Jacksonville), purchased by May in 1959; renamed May-Cohen
- Furchgott's (Jacksonville)
- Gold Triangle (Miami, Plantation, Tampa, Orlando)
- Ivey's (Winter Park), purchased by Dillard's in 1990
- Jackson Byron's (later J. Byrons) (Miami)
- Jordan Marsh (Miami)
- J.M. Fields (Pompano Beach)
- Maas Brothers (Tampa), merged into Burdines in 1991
- Maison Blanche
- McRae's, sold to Belk in 2006
- Richard's, (Miami, Hollywood)
- Robinson's of Florida (St. Petersburg)
- Gayfers (Clearwater, Florida)
- Parisian, sold to Belk in 2007
- W. T. Grant (discount, Jacksonville)
- Woolco (Jacksonville, South Daytona and other locations)
- Zayre (discount, Jacksonville and other locations)

=== Puerto Rico ===
- González Padín (High-end, oldest Puerto Rican department store, founded in 1884, dissolved in 1995.)
- Es de Velasco (High-end, department store, founded in 1939, acquired by González Padín, closed in 1995.)
- New York Department Stores (Founded in 1931, acquired by the Melville Corporation in 1994, most stores turned into Marshalls.)
- Pitusa (Discount, department store, founded in 1976, bankrupt in 2014.)

=== Georgia ===
- Chamberlin-Johnson-DuBose (Atlanta)
- Davison's (Atlanta), owned by Macy's since 1925 and converted to Macy's in 1986
- J.B. White (Augusta), became Dillard's in 1998 after J.B. White name was retired
- J. M. High Company (Atlanta)
- Kessler's (Atlanta), also locations in Rome, Newnan and Canton; low-end chain that closed in 1995
- Parisian acquired by Belk in 2007
- Rich's (Atlanta), part of Federated Dept Stores which purchased RH Macy & Co. and retired Rich’s name
- Uptons (Atlanta), liquidated in 1999; regional chain similar to Kohl's

=== Hawaii ===
- Liberty House (Honolulu)
- Shirokiya (Honolulu)

=== Idaho ===
- Block's Department Store (Idaho Falls and region) It was a Pocatello-based department store chain that had stores in Idaho and Utah and was liquidated in 1986. Not to be confused with the Indianapolis-based William H. Block Co. which was also known as "Block's".
- Idaho Department Store (southern Idaho) Caldwell-based department store chain that was purchased by the P.N. Hirsch division of Interco in 1966 when it had 25 stores and had survived at least to the mid-1980s. The chain was still a part of Interco when P.N. Hirsch was sold in 1983, but there is no mention of the chain in print after that point.
- King's Variety Store

=== Illinois ===
- A. M. Rothschild & Co
- Ames
- Blakely's Department Store with locations in LaSalle and Taylorville, Illinois went out of business in 1971.
- Bergner's (Peoria) closed in 2018
- Carson Pirie Scott (Chicago and suburbs) closed in 2018 reopened 2019 in Evergreen Park closed again in 2020
- Famous Department Store (Ottawa) closed in 1983
- The Fair (Chicago and suburbs), acquired by Montgomery Ward in 1958
- Gately's People's Store
- Goldblatt's (Chicago), some stores acquired by Ames Department Stores Inc.
- K's Merchandise Mart (Decatur)
- Lewis's (Champaign)
- Robeson's (Champaign)
- Henry C. Lytton & Co. (Chicago, with branch in Gary, Indiana)
- Madigans
- MainStreet Chicago, acquired by Kohl's in 1988
- Marshall Field's (Chicago), acquired by Macy's September 2006 despite local protest
- McCabe's (Rock Island)
- McDade's
- Montgomery Ward, mail order store. Founded in 1872, Montgomery Ward pioneered mail-order catalog retailing and opened its first retail store in 1926. A bankruptcy reorganization in 1999 failed to turn the chain around. Closed 2001. Still exists as a catalog/internet/mail order retailer.
- Sears, Roebuck & Co.
- Siegel-Cooper Company
- Chas A. Stevens (Chicago) Purchased by Hartmarx Corp. before being closed.
- Turn Style (Melrose Park), created by The Jewel Companies, Inc., sold to Venture Stores in 1978
- Venture Stores
- Wieboldt's (Chicago)
- Zayre (Chicago)

=== Indiana ===
- Aldens (Terre Haute)
- Ayr-Way (Indianapolis, statewide also surrounding states), originally a division of L. S. Ayres, subsequently acquired by Target
- L.S. Ayres (Indianapolis, 6 stores, and statewide)
- Ball Stores (Muncie)
- William H. Block Co. (Indianapolis, statewide), also was known as Block's
- Danner's Discount Department Stores (Indianapolis, statewide), several locations also known as 3D Discount
- DeJong's (Evansville) Purchased by Hartmarx Corp. and resold before being closed
- Fetla's (Valparaiso)
- The Giant Store (Anderson)
- Goldblatt's (South Bend)
- Gordon's (Gary)
- Heck's (Fort Wayne)
- Hills Department Store (Indianapolis)
- K&S Department Store (Kokomo)
- George H. Knollenberg Co. (Richmond), founded in 1866 by George Knollenberg, closed in 1995
- Meis (Terre Haute), founded in 1923 and was acquired by Elder-Beerman in 1987. At one time, it had 10 stores in three states with locations Terre Haute, Marion, Elkhart, and Kokomo in Indiana, Danville, Mattoon, and Carbondale in Illinois, and Paducah, Kentucky.
- Edward C. Minas Co. (Hammond), also had a branch store in Calumet City, Illinois at River Oaks Center
- Root Dry Goods Co. (Terre Haute) First opened in 1856 and operated until 1998 when it was sold to May Department Stores and converted to L.S. Ayres stores. Was owned by Mercantile Stores from 1914 to 1998.
- L. Strauss & Co. (Indianapolis)
- Prevo. Founded in 1900 by Samuel C. Prevo. Closed in 1992 after 92 years of operation.
- Schultz's Family Stores (statewide and Illinois)
- H. P. Wasson and Company (Indianapolis)
- Weiler's Banner-Fair Incorporated (Anderson, Portland and Hartford City)
- The Wicks Co. (Bloomington), operated between 1891 and 1976.
- Wolf & Dessauer (Fort Wayne, downtown and Southtown, and Huntington), purchased from City Store Company by L. S. Ayres (Indianapolis) in 1969 and rebranded as Ayres
- Zayre (Indianapolis)
- Ziesel's (Elkhart), founded in 1904 and closed in 1986

=== Iowa ===
- Newman's (Cedar Rapids)
- Younkers

=== Kansas ===
- ALCO Stores

8 Gorman's Department Store (Kansas City, Kansas)

- Henry's (Wichita)
- Joe Vaughan Men's Clothing (Kansas City, Kansas)
- Newman's (Arkansas City)
- Woolf Brothers (Wichita)
- Young's Department Store (Kansas City, Kansas)

=== Kentucky ===
- S.W. Anderson's (Owensboro)
- J. Bacon's & Sons "Bacon's" (Louisville), division of Mercantile Stores Company. All locations merged into sister division McAlpin's (Cincinnati) 1980s, select locations converted to Dillard's 1998 with Dillard purchase of Mercantile and the rest closed.
- Ben Snyder's (Louisville), was founded in 1913 and later sold to Hess's in 1987.
- Hess's (Louisville)
- Hub (Danville), opened 1906, renamed Hub-Frankel by 1948. Closed in 1996.
- Kaufman-Straus (Louisville), changed to Kaufman's (1960), purchased from City Stores Company by L. S. Ayres (Indianapolis) in 1969 and rebranded as Ayres
- Mr. Wiggs
- Parson's (Ashland), furniture department continues to operate as standalone business circa 2009
- H. P. Selman & Co. or Selman's (Louisville), founded in 1915, purchased by Weiss Brothers (1961), name changed to Gus Mayer (1970)
- Stewart Dry Goods (Louisville and Lexington), division of Associated Dry Goods. Merged into L. S. Ayres (Indianapolis) along with H & S Pogue Company (Cincinnati) in the early 1980s, then Macy's 2006.
- Wolfe-Wile Co. (Lexington)
- Shopper's Fair (Paducah)

=== Louisiana ===
- Beall-Ladymon (Shreveport), purchased from Horace Ladymon by Stage Stores, Inc. in 1994. Stores converted to Stage soon thereafter.
- D. H. Holmes (New Orleans), purchased by Dillard's in 1989
- Krauss, 1903–1997
- Maison Blanche (New Orleans), last operated under that name by Mercantile Stores Co. Remaining Maison Blanche stores converted to Dillard's in 1998.
- The Palace (Monroe)
- Palais Royal (Shreveport), purchased by Wellan's of Alexandria 1985. Rebranded and later closed. Stage later revived the name after their purchase of Wellan's.
- Selber Bros. (Shreveport), begun in 1907, purchased by and converted to Dillard's in 1988

=== Maine ===
- Ames Department Store
- Arlan's Department Store (Portland)
- Ben Franklin's (Bucksport)
- Bradlee's
- Britt's (Ellsworth)
- Grants Department Store (Bangor, Belfast, Biddeford, Calais, Old Town, Rockland, Portland, Brunswick)
- LS Hall Company Caribou, Maine
- Mammoth Mart (Bangor, Biddeford, Brunswick, Scarborough, Waterville), Ellsworth
- McLellan's (Waterville, Westbrook)
- J.J. Newberry (Lincoln, Millinocket, Calais, Eastport, Ellsworth, Brunswick, Norway)
- Porteous, Mitchell & Braun (Congress Street, Portland), branch locations in Auburn, Bangor, Brunswick, Presque Isle, South Portland, Newington, New Hampshire and Burlington, Vermont
- Freese's, Main St Bangor, Maine

=== Maryland ===
- Bradlees (Dundalk, Baltimore)
- Garfinckel's (Washington, D.C., and Maryland suburbs)
- Hamburgers (Baltimore) Originally Isaac Hamburger & Son's clothiers
- Hechinger (Landover, Baltimore and Maryland suburbs)
- Hecht's (Washington, DC, Baltimore, and Maryland suburbs), converted to Macy's 2006
- Hochschild Kohn's (Baltimore and Maryland suburbs)
- Hutzler's (Baltimore and Maryland suburbs)
- S. Klein (Beltway Plaza, Greenbelt)
- Lansburgh's (Rockville)
- Lazarus (Cumberland)
- Rosenbaum Brothers (Cumberland)
- Stewart's (Baltimore and Maryland suburbs)
- Sunny's Surplus (Baltimore, Dundalk, Elkridge, Towson)
- Woodward & Lothrop aka Woodies (Washington, D. C. and Maryland suburbs)

=== Massachusetts ===
- AJ Wright (Framingham) Sold by TJX Companies, in 2010
- Almy's, closed 1985
- Ames, Southbridge, closed 2002
- Ann & Hope (Seekonk, North Dartmouth, Danvers and Watertown) closed in 2001
- Arlan's Department Store (New Bedford, Fall River, Massachusetts
- The Bon Marché (Lowell), later merged into Jordan Marsh
- Bradlees (Boston, Somerset, Massachusetts)
- Building#19, Swansea, Massachusetts, New Bedford, Massachusetts
- Denholm & McKay (Worcester), two branches at one time
- Filene's (Boston), converted to Macy's 2006
- Filene's Basement (Boston), separated from parent Filene's in 1988, closed 2011
- Forbes & Wallace (Springfield
- Gilchrist's (Boston)
- W. T. Grant, bankrupt in 1976, Fall River, Massachusetts, Somerset, Massachusetts
- J.M. Fields, Fall River, Massachusetts Chelmsford, Massachusetts
- Jordan Marsh (Boston), converted to Macy's in 1991 due to bankruptcy
- Kennedy's of New England, Boston-based chain specializing in men & boy's clothing; closed 1980
- King's Department Stores Inc. (Brockton)
- Lechmere, originally Lechmere Sales (Cambridge), closed 1997, Seekonk, Massachusetts
- Mammoth Mart (flagship store in Framingham)
- Raymond's Department Stores (Boston, also Dedham and other locations)
- Rich's (Salem, Greenfield and other locations), closed 1997
- Spag's (Shrewsbury), 1936–2004, sold to Building#19
- R. H. Stearns and Company (Boston)
- Service Merchandise
- Stuart's Department Store (Lowell)
- Zayre (Framingham), Fall River, Massachusetts
- Wilson's (Greenfield, Massachusetts)

=== Michigan ===
- A. B. Taylor Saugatuck
- Ames Department Store, Menominee
- Arbaugh's of Lansing, also known as Cameron & Arbaugh. See The Arbaugh.
- Arlan's Department Store (Detroit) though not opened in Detroit until 1960s expansion, founded in 1945, bankrupt in 1973
- B. Altman and Company Meridian Mall, Lansing.
- Barie Dry Goods
- Barthwell Drugs, Detroit. Sidney Barthwell founded the company in 1933. "Barthwell Drugs grew to become the largest chain of black-owned drugstores in the United States, with nine stores and three ice-cream parlors. The Sidney Barthwell Endowed Scholarship at Wayne State University College of Pharmacy.
- Beauregard's Department Store, Milan
- Billings Five and Dime Store, Bay City, Michigan
- B. Siegel (Detroit), eight stores at chain's peak, closed in 1981.
- Boston Store Company. Originating with Isaac and Rachel Kratzenstein, it became the Kratze Bros. Department Store in 1912. Bought by the Boston Store Company, which was established by Charles Netcher and local businessmen in 1921. In the deal, the building and stock came to $125,000-$150,000, which was "one of the biggest mercantile deals in the history of Escanaba. Large company which "owned one of the most modern and complete mercantile buildings in the Upper Peninsula."
- Burns & Cowell Saulte Ste. Marie, Newberry, Munising (1922–1933) Partnered with Lauerman Brothers in 1934.
- Burns Department Store (1922–1964), Sault Ste. Marie Newberry, Munising, St. Ignace, Gladstone, Norway, Michigan, Marquette and Ishpeming. Absorbed and then closed some of Lauerman.
- Cameron & Arbaugh Department Store, Lansing
- Carson Pirie Scott & Co. (Carson's), locations in Benton Harbor, Howell, Livonia, Rochester Hills and Clinton Township.
- C. B. Williams Alpena
- Ciechanowski's Dry Goods, Hamtramck
- The Clothes Post (1962–2022), Petoskey
- Colonial Merchandise Mart, downtown Detroit), housed in its headquarters building, an Art Deco architecture building, that is replicated in Lego bricks.
- Crapo Department Store, Bay City
- Crowley's, a/k/a Crowley Milner (Detroit), sold to Value City in 1999. Upscale clients. Originally Partridge and Blackwell Had expanded as far as Ann Arbor and Flint.
- Davidson's Department Store, Hillman, Palmer
- Davis & Fehr Department Store, Ironwood
- Davv's Department Store, Clare
- Demerey's Detroit, purchased by Crowley's in 1974.
- Department Store & Warehouse, E.A. Alray, Prop. Middleville
- Ed Erickson Company (1878–1928) Escanaba one of the oldest in the Upper Peninsula Sole to Lauerman in 1928.
- Eggleson's Department Store, see Mitzelfeld's Department Store, Rochester.
- Elder-Beerman, locations in Adrian, Benton Harbor, Howell, Midland, Monroe, and Norton Shores. Ohio based company. Michigan stores opened in 1987.
- E.J. Korvette Korvette's Founded 1948, Bankrupt 1980.
- E.L. Leland & Co. Saugatuck
- The Fair The Fair Savings Bank Department Store, later abbreviated to the Fair Store (1888–1965) Escanaba, Lansing, Flint opened its doors in 1888 and operated on Ludington Avenue. Allowed their clerks to unionize, even as their competitors resisted.
- Federal's Detroit, discount department store, closed in 1980. Numerous locations elsewhere across the state as well. Steven West acquired the company, and stores had an unfortunate tendency to burn down.
- Felder's Department Store Trenton
- L.H. Field's Department Store, Jackson, Muskegon 122 years, closing in 1987.
- Gambles (1949–1966), Sault Ste. Marie
- Gilmore Brother's 1881–1999 Kalamazoo. Locations in downtown Kalamazoo, Southland, Maple Hill Mall and in Battle Creek's Lakeview Square Mall.
- Gantos. Grand Rapids 1932–2000. Lebanese immigrant Theodore Gantos is the founder. Women's wear boutique.
- Glik's, Manistee
- Goodridge Brothers Saginaw
- Goodyear's Department Store, Ann Arbor.
- Gordman's. Petoskey and Cheboygan
- Goshorn's Store Saugatuck
- Grand Leader Battle Creek.
- Grant's Department Store, Grant
- Grisdale's Department Store, Bay City, Michigan
- Hale's Department Store, South Haven, 154 years.
- Heavenrich's Saginaw.
- Herpolsheimer's, (Grand Rapids, Muskegon), sold to Lazarus in 1988. Also a location in Battle Creek.
- Heyn's Department Store Detroit.
- Himelhoch's (Detroit), filed for Chap. 11 in 1979. Founded in Caro, MI in 1876, Himelhoch's moved to Detroit in 1907. Himelhoch's Department Store returned online in 2018 under the ownership of fourth-generation family members. Closed in 1977. "Fifty years later, the chain had stretched across the country, and even to Paris." Its original location on Washington Boulevard is a historic landmark.
- Houseman's Grand Rapids.
- Howell's Department Store, Howell
- Hudson's (Detroit), founded 1881 by Joseph L. Hudson rebranded to Marshall Field & Company in 2001, then Macy's in 2006. Locations throughout the Lower Peninsula as well as Toledo, Ohio, and Fort Wayne and Mishawaka, Indiana. "The 29-story flagship store, located at 1206 Woodward in downtown Detroit, was the worlds tallest department store throughout most of the 20th century, with 706 fitting rooms, 68 elevators, 51 display windows, five restaurants, a fine-art gallery, and a wine department."*
- Hughes & Hatcher, later Hughes, Hatcher & Sufferin. Clothing store located in downtown Detroit, men's fashion, and "known for having the largest display windows."
- Jacobson's founded in Jackson or Reed City. Independent regional luxury department store chain located primarily in Michigan and Florida, but also operated stores in Ohio, Indiana, Kentucky, and Kansas. The last store closed its doors in early 2002. Then, one store in Winter Park, Florida was re-established as Jacobson's in 2004.
- Jackson & Tinole Department Store Pellston Independent regional luxury department store chain.
- John Preih Mercantile Co. Mount Clemens, closed June 1982.
- Jos. S Zolnierek General Store Alpena
- Julian Scott Department Store Detroit
- Kahn's Department Store, Mikado
- Kennedy's Department Store, Manistee
- Kern's Detroit, closed in 1959.
- Kline & Grossman Hardware Store Muskegon
- Kline's Department Store, Ann Arbor, 1930–1994. Ann Arbor had as many as fifteen stores in its downtown that sold dry goods. Detroit Nationally, there were 22 stores.
- Knapp's (J.W. Knapp Company) closed in 1980. Locations in downtown Lansing, Meridian Mall in Okemos and Westwood Mall in Jackson. Also included Smith Bridgman's of Flint. All three buildings were sold to J. C. Penney in the 1980s.
- Knapp's Department Store, Lansing
- Knepp's Department Store, Bay City
- Kresge's and S. S. Kresge (Michigan) (incorporated in 1899), later K-Mart Corporation (headquartered in Troy), then Sears Holdings Corporation is frequently credited with invention of the modern discount department store with the opening of Kmart in 1962. The last Kresge's store in Livonia, Michigan closed in 1987. The chain operated over 2,000 stores worldwide. Stores included lunch counters and fountain service as well as full department stores. It also operated Jupiter stores which were a smaller-scale version of Kresge's and located in downmarket or declining commercial districts (the equivalent of a "dollar store" division of Kresge's). Jupiter stores, unlike Kresge and Kmart stores, sold 'factory seconds' merchandise.
- Lapeer Mercantile Company, Lapeer
- Larsen's Department Store, Manistee
- Lauerman Brothers Department Store Marinette, Wisconsin, Menominee, Sault Ste. Marie (1904–1985) Its flagship store in Marinette, Wisconsin is a registered historic place. The chain consisted of 13 stores in Wisconsin, Michigan, and Iowa. In 2013 the Wisconsin Historical Society Press published a history of the chain titled "Something for Everyone: Memories of Lauerman Brothers Department Store" by Michael Leannah. (ISBN 0-87020-581-1)
- The Leader (1888–1918 at least), D.K. Moses opened in 1888 and in 1904 when it reopened after a fire it was two stories in height with a basement store and covered 22,000 square feet. Whereupon, it was described as "one of the most complete department stores to be found in the north country." In 1918 the store employed 23 female clerks.
- Leland's Department Store Co. Saugatuck
- Lendzon's, Hamtramck
- Lord & Taylor
- The L.H. Field Company Jackson (1869–1991)
- Lloyd's Department Store, a/k/a "The Wonder Store" (1926–1946) Menominee
- Mack & Co. (originally Mack & Schmid) located at Liberty and Main Street, Ann Arbor, in the building that eventually housed the later Pretzel Bell. It was in business from the end of the 19th Century to 1940.
- Marsh's Department Store Au Gres
- May & Sons a/k/a May's of Michigan a/k/a Giant Clothing Store ("The Giant"), owned by Meyer May, who owned the Frank Lloyd Wright-designed Meyer May House. Grand Rapids
- The M.W.Tanner Company Department Store, Saginaw
- John H. Maurer Bargain Store, Cadillac
- Mill End, Bay City and Clare
- Milliken's, Traverse City with branches in Manistee, Cadillac, and Mount Pleasant. See William Milliken.
- Miracle Mart Detroit 8 Mile Road.
- Mitchell Brothers Company Department Store, Jennings
- Mitzelfeld's Department Store, Rochester
- Montgomery Ward. Aaron Montgomery Ward, its founder grew up in Niles. Various locations, including Dearborn, Jackson, Harper Woods, Lansing, Southfield, Southgate, Livonia Pontiac, Royal Oak Wyoming Ludington, Manistee, Port Huron, Roseville, Three Rivers.
- Morrison and Schneider Seney and Germfask (1893–1914)
- Mott's Department Store Dundee.
- Muirhead Department Store Dearborn.
- Mulias and Ellias Trenton.
- Neisner's
- Niergarth Department Store, Reed City
- Norman's, Bay City, East Tawas, Gaylord, Standish, Traverse City
- Newberry's, Manistee
- O.A. Wolbrink & Sons Department Store, Ganges
- O.W. Ferris Dry Goods & Notions, Hillsdale
- Peebles, Alpena
- Penzlauer & Bros. Saulte Ste. Marie (1868 – 1906). In 1887 they established what became "a mammoth" department with some 17,790 square feet, four stories tall. "It was considered at opening "the largest general store in Michigan outside Detroit." Penzlauer Bros. had large lumber-related business. In 1906 when they sold out and opened a store in Los Angeles. The successor was Cowan & Hunt, who renamed the store Penzlauer Bros. & Company. On January 1, 1918 the name was changed to Cowan & Hunt. Both companies hired women clerks and in 1918 there were 29 women working there.
- Pier One
- People's Outfitting Company Detroit with roots going back to 1877 (preceded by Adolph and Ignatz Freund, German immigrants who came to Detroit in 1877 selling "Toys and Fancy Goods"), merged with State Sample Company in 1959. (1916–1969) According to Twentieth Century Retailing in Downtown Detroit by Michael Hauser and Marianne Weldon it was "the first large retail concern to extend credit at retail."
- Pizer's Variety Store, Harrisville, originally The White Store, at the corner of Lake Street and Main Street.
- Porter's Dry Goods (1838), Petoskey
- H. C. Prange Co. (Prange's), locations in Marquette, Port Huron and Traverse City. Sold to Younker's.
- Robert Hall Clothes, men's fashions Highland Park
- Roberts Department Store Sandusky
- Robinson's, Battle Creek. Sold to and operated as Herpolsheimer's (of Grand Rapids) for a period.
- Rogers Department Store Grand Rapids.
- Rudyard Department Store Rudyard
- Russell Taylor "Pay as you Go" Saugatuck
- Sam's Cut Rate, Detroit
- Sam & Son Cut Rate Plymouth
- Sears Roebuck & Co. Allen Park (Lincoln Park Shopping Center, one of the largest), Clinton Township, Madison Heights, Monroe, Port Huron.
- Sears
- Seegert's & Klump Hardware, Riga
- Seitner's Department Store, downtown and Fashion Square Mall, Saginaw
- Shoppers Fair By December 1974, all of the Detroit stores were closed, and by 1975, the ten remaining stores in the chain had gone out of business as well.
- Shoppers' World Highland Park
- B. Siegel & Company, originally Heyns Bazaar. Fine-clothing store "reputed to be the finest and most complete suit and cloak store in America," bankrupt in 1981.
- Smith Bridgman Flint.
- J.B. Sperry (Sperry's) (1893–2000), Port Huron
- Stage Department Store, Cadillac
- Steketee's (Grand Rapids), with branches at Eastbrook Mall and in Kalamazoo (Maple Hill Mall), Holland (Westshore Mall), Grand Haven, and downtown Muskegon (Muskegon Mall), Muskegon
- Teerman's, Holland.
- Tempo Department Store, then a part of Gambles Store network. Menominee (1967–1975)
- The Fair Savings Bank Department Store, a/k/a The Fair Department Store, Escanaba See Escanaba Central Historic District.
- Toeller's (Battle Creek), sold to L. W. Robinson Co. in 1971. The Calhoun County Toeller Building was designed by Cain Associates and dedicated in September, 1977.
- Tom Hinzelman's Department Store, Manistique
- Tom's Department Store, Newberry
- Topps (Redford Township), Telegraph & Schoolcraft; (Warren), 13 Mile & Van Dyke; all closed by 1974, Southgate.
- Tripp's Department Store, Allegan
- Tyroller's Department Store, St. Louis
- W.D. Ryan Department Store Lawrence
- West End Department Store, Battle Creek
- Westerland's Department Store, Oxford
- Woolco Meridian Mall, Lansing.
- F.B. Watkins, Hopkins
- The White Store, Lapeer
- Wiechmann's Department Store, downtown and Fashion Square Mall, Saginaw
- Winkelman's, (Detroit). purchased by Petrie Stores in 1983; closed during bankruptcy in 1998.
- Wonderland Discount Department Stores, Laporte and Michigan City, Indiana and Dowagiac, Niles and South Haven, Michigan
- Woolworth
- W.J. Loder Hardware Store, purchased in 1893 by J.B. Sperry, Port Huron
- W.T. Grant
- Wurzburg's, Grand Rapids. Branches in Wyoming, North Kent Mall, Lansing Mall (Lansing), and Westwood Mall (Jackson) at its peak.
- Yankee Stores, discount store with locations in Michigan and Ohio; closed in 1974.
- Younkers, Midland, Marquette, Traverse City, Okemos, Grandville, Holland, Port Huron, and Norton Shores. Sold to and operated by Bon-Ton Stores at the end of their existence.
- Zayre. Kalamazoo
- Zolkower Department Stores, many locations in the Detroit area, 1919–1962. Stores were located in Delray, Allen Park, Dearborn and Farmington.

=== Minnesota ===
- Dayton's (Minneapolis), est. 1902, converted to Marshall Field & Company in 2001, then Macy's 2006
- Donaldson's (Minneapolis), est. 1883, converted to Carson Pirie Scott in 1987 and closed in 1995
- Goldfine’s (Duluth) closed in 1975
- Harold's (Minneapolis)
- Herberger's (St. Cloud)
- Norby's Department Store Detroit Lakes
- Powers Dry Goods (Minneapolis), est. 1881, acquired by Associated Dry Goods in 1920, merged with Donaldson's in 1985
- Salkin & Linoff (Minneapolis)
- Young-Quinlan (Minneapolis)

=== Mississippi ===
- McRae's (Jackson), acquired by Belk in 2006

=== Missouri ===
- Famous-Barr (St. Louis), founded 1911, flagship of May, acquired by Macy's 2006
- Goedeker's 1847 filed for bankruptcy, despite being founded in 1951.
- Heer's (Springfield), established in 1869, closed in 1995
- The Jones Store (Kansas City), absorbed by May Department Stores 1998, sold to Macy's chain 2006
- The Paris (Kansas City)
- Kmart (St. Louis)
- Newman's (Joplin), acquired by parent company of Heer's of Springfield in the early 1980s, closed in 1995
- Scruggs Vandervoort & Barney (St. Louis), closed in 1967
- Stix, Baer, Fuller (St. Louis), acquired by Dillard's in 1983
- Townsend & Wall (St. Joseph)
- Venture Stores (St. Louis)
- Woolf Brothers (Kansas City), founded 1865, closed in 1992. (See Herbert M. Woolf.)

=== Montana ===
- Buttrey's (Havre) (Miles City) (Wolf Point, Montana)
- Cole's (Billings)
- Hennessy's, acquired by Dillard's in 1998
- J.M. McDonald (Montana, Wyoming, others)

=== Nebraska ===
- J.L. Brandeis and Sons Store (Omaha), acquired by Younkers in 1987
- Gold and Company (Lincoln), acquired by J.L. Brandeis and Sons Store in 1964. The building is now a Hampton Inn by Hilton.
- Herpolsheimer's (Lincoln), closed 1931.
- J.M. McDonald (Hastings), eventually grew to a chain of 82 stores, sold in 1968, liquidated shortly after 1982
- Miller & Paine (Lincoln and Grand Island), acquired by Dillard's in 1988
- Rudge & Guenzel (Lincoln), acquired by Allied Stores in 1929, closed in 1941 when Allied sold the contents of the store to Gold & Co.
- The Avenues: opened in 1949 and filed for chap 11 in 2010, closed all stores, except 3. 1 in NJ, 1 in OH, and 1 in FL.

=== Nevada ===
- Ronzone's (Las Vegas et al.)

=== New Hampshire ===
- Steinbach (Manchester, New Hampshire) Sold to The Bon-Ton

=== New Jersey ===
- Great Eastern (aka Great Eastern Mills) Paramus, NJ, Little Falls NJ, Elmont NY and others. Merged with Diana Stores, then Daylin inc., which closed the chain
- Alexander's (Paramus)
- Bamberger's (Newark and other NJ locations), division of R.H. Macy, converted to Macy's in 1986
- Chase-Newark (Newark and 2 branches)
- J.M. Fields
- W. T. Grant
- Hahne and Company (Newark and statewide), New Jersey's "carriage trade" store merged into sister division Lord & Taylor
- Jamesway
- E. J. Korvette (North Brunswick Trenton)
- G.C. Murphy (Salem, New Jersey)
- Kresge-Newark (Newark and 2 branches)
- Muir's Department Store
- Ohrbach's
- Reynolds Brothers (Lakewood)
- Steinbach (New Jersey locations)
- Two Guys (also known as Two Guys from Harrison)
- Yards Department Store (Trenton)
- Tepper's (Plainfield)
- Quackenbush (Paterson) Merged with Stern's

=== New York (state) ===
- Abraham & Straus (Brooklyn)
- J. N. Adam & Co. (Buffalo)
- The Addis Company, merged with Dey Brothers (Syracuse)
- Alexander's (New York metropolitan area), declared bankruptcy in 1992
- B. Altman and Company (New York City)
- AM&A's (Adam, Meldrum & Anderson Company, Buffalo), purchased by The Bon-Ton of York, Pennsylvania in 1994
- Arnold Constable (Fifth Avenue, New York City)
- Barker's (multiple locations)
- Bamberger's
- Barneys New York
- Beirs (Niagara Falls)
- L.L. Berger (Buffalo), last store, in downtown Buffalo, closed in 1991
- Best & Co. (New York), closed in the 1960s
- Bonwit Teller (New York City, Boston, and upstate New York)
- Britt's (Vestal) multiple locations including Gloversville/Johnstown
- Caldor
- Chappell's (Syracuse), merged into The Bon-Ton of York, Pennsylvania in the 1990s
- De Pinna on Fifth Avenue, Manhattan
- Dey Brothers (Dey's, Syracuse)
- Family Bargain Centers (Binghamton, Norwich, South Corning)
- J.M. Fields
- B. Forman Co. (Rochester)
- Fowler, Dick & Walker – The Boston Store (Binghamton), now Boscov's
- Franklin Simon & Co.
- Genung's (White Plains and at least seven other locations), became Howland, then Steinbach
- Georg Jensen Inc. (New York, NY) (Manhattan) 1935–1968
- Gertz Department Stores (Queens, Nassau and Suffolk counties), owned by Allied Stores; closed in 1982 and changed to Stern's then Macy's
- Gimbels (Manhattan). The rivalry of Macy's and Gimbels is immortalized in Miracle on 34th Street; Bernard Gimbel, the owner of Gimbels, along with Horace Saks founded Saks Fifth Avenue
- Gold Circle (multiple locations)
- Grand Way (Grand Union (supermarket))
- W. T. Grant (Binghamton, Troy, Long Island, Queens, and others)
- Hens and Kelly (Buffalo)
- Hess New Hartford, Rotterdam
- Hills Department Stores
- Jamesway (Oneonta), currently Price Chopper Plaza Rte 28. Also Johnstown
- Jenss (Buffalo), closed their last location on September 15, 2000
- Jupiter Stores, Division of the S.S. Kresge Company.
- Kobacker, two locations in Buffalo, New York; closure announced on December 27, 1972. No relation to Kobacker's Market, a grocery store in Brewster, New York
- E.J. Korvette (New York City), closed 1980
- Kresge's (multiple locations)
- Loehmann's, peaked at about 100 stores in 17 states, liquidated in 2014 after several bankruptcies.
- Lord & Taylor 1823-2020
- Luckey, Platt & Company Department Store (Poughkeepsie)
- Martin's (Brooklyn)
- J.W. Mays (Downstate New York), closed 1989, now leases old store locations
- McClean's (Binghamton)
- McCrory's (Johnson City, Amsterdam, Utica, others)
- G. C. Murphy
- John G. Myers (Albany)
- J.J. Newberry (multiple locations)
- Neisner's or Neisner Brothers was a chain of variety stores in North America, opened their first variety store in Rochester, New York, in 1911.
- Ohrbach's, liquidated in 1987 and acquired by Howland-Steinbach
- Ovington's New York, liquidated in bankruptcy 1950; assets acquired by American Limoges Co.
- Pharmhouse
- Philadelphia Sales (Binghamton, Johnson City, Endicott)
- S. Klein (New York City), closed 1978
- Sattler's (Buffalo)
- Sibley's (Sibley, Lindsey, & Curr) (Rochester, in 1911, unit of Associated Dry Goods absorbed into Kaufmann's in 1990
- Siegel-Cooper Company
- Sisson's (Binghamton)
- A.T. Stewart's (Manhattan), purchased by Wanamaker's of Pennsylvania
- Times Square Stores, discount department chain mostly focused on Long Island
- Twin Fair, Inc. dba Twin Fair (multiple locations)
- Two Guys (multiple locations)
- John Wanamaker or Wanamaker's (New York City), sold to Carter Hawley Hale in 1979, then Washington, DC–based Woodward & Lothrop owned by Alfred Taubman; sold to May Company in 1995; merged with Federated Department Stores in 2005 (now known as Macy's, Inc.)
- Woolworth's multiple locations
- Zayre's (currently Wal-Mart, Miller Hill, Q) became Ames. Multiple locations

=== North Carolina ===
- Brody's (Kinston), acquired by Proffitt's in 1998
- Clarks Department Store Greensboro, North Carolina, acquired by Cooks in 1968, closed 1982
- Ivey's (Charlotte), acquired by Dillard's in 1990
- Sky City closed 1990

=== North Dakota ===
- The Fair (Minot)

=== Ohio ===
- Alms and Doepke (Cincinnati), Located furthest from central downtown Cincinnati relative to other department stores: N. side of Central Pkwy. between Walnut and Race Streets in an area bordering the "Over the Rhine" district; no branch stores. Closed and liquidated in 1955
- Best, closed in 1996
- Bargain City (Toledo), started by Hyman Swolsky in Toledo as Bargain Barn, later renamed Bargain City, sold to Gray Drug Co. of Cleveland in 1967, renamed Rink's Bargain City after merger, sold to Cook United Inc. and renamed Rink's in 1981, closed in 1987
- Bailey Brothers (Cleveland, Ohio) Later Bailey's Department Store, closed 1968.
- B.R. Baker, Toledo
- Buckeye Mart (Columbus, Ohio) owned by Gamble-Skogmo, Inc.; Columbus stores closed in the mid-1970s; Remaining Ohio stores along with Tempo stores in Michigan were sold to Fisher's Big Wheel Stores and renamed Fisher's Buckeye Tempo.
- Clark's (Portsmouth), owned by Clark's Gamble Corp., whose two shareholders were Landau Stores, Inc. and Gamble-Skogmo, Inc., Clark's Gamble Corp. was later sold to Cook United
- Cook's flagship of Cook United Corporation.
- Donenfeld's (Dayton)
- Elder-Beerman
- Fashion Fair {Cincinnati, Newark, Marion, Findlay, Middletown} Sold to Twin Fair which the Ohio stores became Meijer
- Federal's, (Cleveland, Ohio), branches of Federal Department Stores in Michigan not part of Federated Stores, this company closed in 1974
- Fisher's Big Wheel and Fisher's Buckeye-Tempo (Pittsburgh, Pennsylvania), Closed 1994
- Frank Brothers (Marion, Ohio), Closed 1979.
- Gaylords Department Store, Northeastern Ohio, Giant Tiger until 1968
- Gold Circle (Columbus, Ohio) part of the Federated Stores Company
- Goldman's (Dayton)
- Gregg's (Lima)
- Halle Brothers Co. (Cleveland), also known as "Halle's", division of Marshall Field & Company, sold 1981 to Associated Investors Corp, Downtown closed 1982, Final Westgate Location in Fairview Park, Ohio closed in 1983
- Harts Stores a division of Big Bear Stores, Columbus, Ohio
- Heck's Department Store
- Higbee's (Cleveland), converted to Dillard's in 1992, now the Jack Cleveland Casino
- Hills Department Stores
- Milner's, Toledo
- J.J. Newberry. This chain had many stores in Ohio including: Coshocton, Wooster, East Palestine, Cincinnati. The company came under control of McCrory Stores in 1974. John Josiah Newberry, founder of the company, died in 1954.
- John J. Carroll (Newark).
- Jupiter Stores, Division of the S.S. Kresge Company. Operated several stores in Ohio. Including one in Downtown Mount Vernon, Ohio which had been a S. S. Kresge store for many years. Also a location in Downtown Ashland, Ohio. Jupiter was a no frills store. When leases were soon to be up on several S. S. Kresge stores the Jupiter format was put in place. All remaining Kresge and Jupiter stores were sold to McCrory in 1987 with the Canadian Kresge and Jupiter stores closing in 1994.
- Kobackers (Canton, Mansfield, Portsmouth), purchase by Davidson Bros., the parent of Federal's in 1961
- Lamson Brothers (Toledo). Lamson's entered bankruptcy and closed in 1976.
- Lasalle & Koch Co. (Toledo), bought by R.H. Macy in 1923; operated under the Lasalle's name until 1981, when Macy consolidated Lasalle's with another division, Macy's Missouri-Kansas, to form Macy's Midwest. Macy sold the former Lasalle's stores to Elder-Beerman of Dayton in 1985.
- Lazarus (Columbus), a founding division of Federated Stores, name change briefly to Lazarus-Macy's and then Macy's in 2005.
- Leader Store (Lima), converted to Elder-Beerman, still operating as of 2009
- The Lion Dry Goods Co. (Toledo), known locally as the Lion Store. Some locations survive as of 2009 with the Dillard's name, following their 1998 purchase of Lion's previous owner, Mercantile Stores Co.
- Mabley & Carew (Cincinnati), unit of Allied Department Stores
- May Company (Cleveland), merged into Kaufmann's in 1993 and converted to Macy's 2006
- McAlpin's (Cincinnati), unit of Mercantile Stores Co., select locations operating as Dillard's as of 2009
- Morehouse Martens (Columbus, Ohio), merged with "The Fashion" to become "Morehouse-Fashion," later shortened to "The Fashion"; closed by Allied Stores in 1969
- Mr. Wiggs Sandusky based chain that had stores in Ohio, Kentucky, and Indiana, started in Mentor as Bargain Fair in 1956, gradually rebranded stores Mr. Wiggs by 1967
- Murphy's Mart
- Neisner's (Lakewood, Ohio) & Warren Village Shopping Center Cleveland, Ohio. Warren Village store burned in 1972, Lakewood store closed in 1978.
- O'Neil's Department Store (Akron), merged into May Company Cleveland, in 1989 & then Kaufmann's in 1993, converted to Macy's in 2006
- Ontario's (Columbus) part of Cook United.
- H. & S. Pogue Company (Cincinnati), division of Associated Dry Goods. Merged into sister division L.S. Ayres (Indianapolis) in the early 1980s, which was converted to Macy's in 2006.
- Polsky's (Akron), purchased by Allied Stores in 1955 and closed in 1978
- Rattenberg's, (Utica).
- Rike Kumler Co. (Dayton), division of Federated Department Stores. Briefly merged into sister division John Shillito Company (Cincinnati) in the early 1980s as Shillito-Rike's.
- Rink's Founded by Hyman Ullner in Hamilton in 1951; acquired by Gray Drug Co. of Cleveland in 1964; Bargain City acquired by Gray Drug in 1967; both chains sold to Cook United in 1981; closed in 1987.
- Rollman's (Cincinnati) Downtown store location—N.W. corner of 5th and Vine Streets—was taken over by Mabley & Carew after primary and branch Rollman's stores were liquidated in the early 1960s
- Rudin's (Mount Vernon), sold to Uhlman's in 1979
- John Shillito Company (Cincinnati), division of Federated Department Stores. Briefly merged into sister division Rike-Kumler Company (Dayton) in the early 1980s as Shillito-Rike's, and then with sister division F&R Lazarus (Columbus). Select locations converted to Macy's 2006.
- Stein's, Toledo
- Sterling-Lindner-Davis (Cleveland), closed September, 1968; was a part of Allied Stores
- Stern and Mann (Canton), opened in 1887, close by the early 1990s
- Strouss (Youngstown), division of May Department Stores, merged into May's Kaufmann's (Pittsburgh) division, converted to Macy's 2006
- Swallen's (Cincinnati, Ohio), bankrupt in 1995
- The Fashion (store) (Columbus, Ohio), purchased by Allied Stores in 1949; later merged with Morehouse Martens to form "Morehouse Fashion"; Later returned to The Fashion
- William Taylor & Son (Cleveland), also known at Taylor's, acquired by May Company in 1939, closed in December, 1961. Southgate branch changed to May Company
- Tiedtke's (Toledo)
- Twin Fair Buffalo, New York based chain of general merchandise stores in roughly 50,000 sq. ft. buildings. Cincinnati, Middletown, Springfield, Newark, Marion, Findlay. Newark received the newest building replacing a smaller one in 1978. This store had a full scale grocery unit whereas the other stores did not. Meijer bought the Ohio stores from Twin Fair in 1982 and converted all of them to the Meijer Square format with the exception of the Newark store which became Ohio's first Meijer Thrifty Acres.
- Uhler's (Marion, Ohio) Founded as the Uhler Phillips Company. James Phillips left the company following the scandal that linked his wife Carrie Phillips with President Warren G. Harding.
- Uhlman's (Bowling Green), also known as F.W. Uhlman in Ohio, Illinois, Indiana and Michigan, purchased by Stage Stores Inc. in 1996
- Uncle Bill's, a northeast Ohio chain that was part of Cook United stores.
- Union Company (Columbus), purchased by Marshall Field's in 1980 and converted to Halle Brothers which was also owned by Marshall Fields
- Valley View (Brookfield), operated 1959–1995.
- Value City Sold by Schottenstein holdings of Columbus, re-branded as Halle's in 1980 and closed in 1983
- Van Leunen's (Cincinnati), closed in 1994 when parent company decided to focus on sporting goods
- Edward Wren Co. (Springfield), also was known as Wren's, sold to Allied Stores in 1952, merged with & rebranded as William H. Block Co. (Indianapolis) in 1984, closed 1987
- Zayre was a chain of discount stores that operated in the eastern half of the United States from 1956 to 1990, later sold to Ames (store)
- Ziegler's (Medina), opened in 1904, closed in 1992

=== Oklahoma ===
- Froug's (Tulsa)
- Brown-Dunkin (Tulsa)
- John A. Brown (Oklahoma City), was part of Dayton Hudson; absorbed by Dillard's
- Halliburton's (Scott-Halliburton, Gloyd-Halliburton, McEwen-Halliburton)(Oklahoma City)
- Kerr's (Oklahoma City)
- Oertle's (Tulsa)
- Renberg's (Tulsa)
- Stockton's (Midwest City)
- Vandever's (Tulsa)
- Wilmor (Oklahoma City)

=== Oregon ===
- Lipman's (was part of Dayton Hudson)
- Olds, Wortman & King (Portland)
- Emporium (also known as Troutman's Emporium)
- Meier & Frank
- G.I. Joe's

=== Pennsylvania ===
- Ames
- Bamberger's (Newark and other NJ locations), division of R.H. Macy, most former locations switched to Macy's in 1986
- BEST
- Big N (1960s)
- Bloom Brothers Department Stores (Chambersburg, Waynesboro, Dry Run, and Burnt Cabins; also Baltimore, Maryland), 1897–1944
- Boston Store (Erie)
- Bradlees
- Britt's Department Store (Allentown)
- Caldor
- Cox's (McKeesport), 1955–1983
- E. J. Korvette (Philadelphia area)
- Fisher's Big Wheel, closed in 1994
- Fowler, Dick & Walker, The Boston Store (downtown Wilkes-Barre), converted to Boscov's
- Frank & Seder (Pittsburgh)
- GC Murphy Co. (Pittsburgh & suburbs)
- Gee Bee Department Stores
- Gimbels (Philadelphia, Downtown Pittsburgh and suburbs)
- The Globe Store (Scranton), closed in 1994
- Glosser Brothers
- Gold Circle
- (W.T.) Grant's Department Store (Sayre)
- Hess's (Allentown), closed in 1996
- Hills Department Stores
- Horne's (Pittsburgh), closed in 1994
- Jamesway
- J.M. Fields
- John Wanamaker or Wanamaker's (Philadelphia), sold to Carter Hawley Hale in 1979, then Washington, DC–based Woodward & Lothrop owned by Alfred Taubman; sold to May Company (Hecht's) in 1995; merged with Federated Department Stores in 2005 (now known as Macy's, Inc.)
- Katz Bros. (Honesdale)
- Kaufman's (Uniontown)
- Kaufmann's (Pittsburgh), converted to Macy's 2006
- S. Klein (Broomall)
- Kresge's (Pittsburgh and Suburbs) (S.S. Kresge was also the founder of K-Mart Stores)
- S. H. Kress & Co. (Nanticoke)
- Laneco (Easton)
- Lazarus (Downtown Pittsburgh and suburbs) – now Macy's
- Leh's (Allentown area), closed in 1994
- Lit Brothers (Philadelphia), closed in 1977
- LL Stearns Williamsport, Pennsylvania
- McCrory
- Metzlers
- Montgomery Ward
- Murphy's Mart (Pittsburgh and Suburbs)
- J.J. Newberry (multiple locations)
- Orr's (Bethlehem, Easton), closed in 1993
- Penn Traffic
- Service Merchandise
- Snellenburg's (Philadelphia area), 1869–1962
- Strawbridge & Clothier (Philadelphia), converted to Macy's 2006
- Towers (Pittsburgh and suburbs)
- Trader Horn (Butler)
- Two Guys Department Store
- The Bon-Ton Department Store (Based in York, Pa.)
- Watt & Shand (Lancaster), sold to The Bon-Ton
- Woolworth's (Pittsburgh and suburbs)
- Zayre (Pittsburgh & suburbs)
- Zollinger Harned (Allentown)

=== Rhode Island ===
- Apex Stores (flagship in Pawtucket)
- The Outlet Company (Providence)
- The Shepard Co. (Providence)
- Benny's, a discount store based in Smithfield that had locations in Rhode Island, Connecticut, and Massachusetts. All locations closed in December 2017.
- Ann & Hope (Cumberland) Downgraded in 2001 closed all outlet stores in 2020.

=== South Carolina ===
- J. B. White

=== South Dakota ===
- Fantle's

=== Tennessee ===
- Bry's (Memphis), sold to the parent company of Lowenstein's in 1956 before going out of business
- Cain-Sloan (Nashville), acquired by Dillard's in 1987
- Castner Knott (Nashville), division of Mercantile Stores Company
- Fazio's
- Gerber's (Memphis), closed in 1975
- Goldsmith's (Memphis), Merged into Rich's, later converted to Macy's
- Harvey's (Nashville)
- Julius Lewis (Memphis)
- Loveman's (Chattanooga), acquired by Proffitt's in 1986
- McClure's (Nashville)
- Miller's of Tennessee (Knoxville), sold to Dillard's in 1987
- Parisian acquired by Belk in 2007
- Proffitt's (Alcoa), converted to Belk stores in 2006

=== Texas ===
- Barker's (San Antonio)
- Cox's (Waco), closed in 1995
- Dunlaps (Lubbock and many other West Texas/New Mexico locations), closed in 2007
- Fedway (Wichita Falls, Longview, Amarillo, Midland, Corpus Christi), a division of Federated Department Stores that had existed in Texas from 1952 to 1968 in which stores were opened in expanding post-World War II markets of Texas and later the rest of the Southwest that were traditionally under served by existing chains; the first store opening in Wichita Falls in 1952; after expanding throughout Texas, chain expanded into New Mexico, Oklahoma, and California
- Foley's (Foley Brothers) (Houston), division of May Company, converted to Macy's in 2006
- Frost Bros. (San Antonio)
- Gemco (Houston)
- Joske's (San Antonio, also Houston and Dallas), acquired by Dillard's in 1987
- Mitchell's (Fort Worth)
- My Shoes (San Antonio, 1988, Tagline "Put Yourself in My Shoes")
- The Popular (El Paso)
- Sakowitz (Houston)
- Sanger-Harris (Dallas), division of Federated Department Stores, merged into sister division Foley's (Houston) in 1987, converted to Macy's in 2006
  - Sanger Brothers (Dallas)
- E.M. Scarbrough & Sons (Austin)
- Stripling & Cox (Fort Worth)
  - Cox's (Fort Worth) merged with W.C. Stripling & Sons
  - W.C. Stripling & Sons (Fort Worth), merged with Cox's
- The Fair Store (Department store in Port Arthur, Beaumont, and Galveston in the 1970s)
- Titche-Goettinger (Dallas area), merged with Joske's in 1979

=== Utah ===
- Mervyns (the chain may come back, by the Morris decisions)
- Fred Meyer
  - Grand Central Stores, acquired by Fred Meyer 1985, acquired 1999 by Kroger in a merger and operations assumed by Smith's Food and Drug Stores (now a separate division of Kroger and converted into Smith's Marketplace)
- ZCMI (Zions Cooperative Mercantile Institution), founded and operated by the LDS Church until purchased by May Company (1999), became Meier and Frank in 2003, some stores sold to Dillard's, others became Macy's in 2005

=== Vermont ===
- Abernathy's (Church Street, Burlington)
- Britts Department Store (Springfield)
- Grand Way (South Burlington)
- Magram's (Church Street, Burlington (1914–1990), and Rutland (1976–1989))

=== Virginia ===
- Bradlees
- BEST
- GC Murphy Co.
- Hechts (bought by The May Department Stores Company in 1959, took over Thalhimer's and Miller & Rhoads in 1990, bought by Federated Department Stores in 2005 and spun off into Macy's East and Macy's South in 2006)
- S.H. Heironimus (Roanoke)
- J.M. Fields
- Miller & Rhoads (Richmond)
- Rices Nachmans, formerly the Rices and Nachmans chains (Norfolk/Hampton Roads metro area)
- Robert Hall Village
- Thalhimers (Richmond)

=== Washington (state) ===
- The Crescent (Spokane), a division of B.A.T.U.S
- Frederick & Nelson (Seattle), division of Marshall Field & Company (Chicago)
- Lamonts
- Peoples (Tacoma), 7-store chain in the Puget Sound region, owned by Mercantile Stores Co.; closed in 1983
- Rhodes Brothers (Tacoma), renamed Liberty House in 1974
- Valu-Mart (Seattle), renamed Leslie's in 1974, acquired by Fred Meyer in 1976
- Wigwam Stores Inc. (based in Seattle)
- White Front (Burien, Tacoma, Shoreline, Bellevue, Everett), 1969 to 1972

=== West Virginia ===
- Ames various locations
- The Diamond (Charleston and Vienna)
- Gee Bee Part of Glosser Brothers of Ohio.
- Heck's Department Store, shuttered in the early 1990s
- Hills
- L.A. Joe Department Store
- G. C. Murphy
- Stone & Thomas, West Virginia's biggest department store chain; bought by Elder-Beerman in 1998
- Watson's

=== Wisconsin ===
- Boston Store (Milwaukee)
- T.A. Chapman Co. (Milwaukee)
- Copps Department Store (Stevens Point), their department stores closed 1984, when Copps decided to shift their focus over to their supermarkets.
- Gimbels (Milwaukee), converted to Marshall Field's then one former Gimbels location (Madison) to Macy's 2006.
- Hoff Department Store (Mount Horeb) closed 1984
- H.C. Prange Co. (Sheboygan), sold to Younkers in 1992
- Lauerman's (Marinette) Thirteen stores in Northeastern Wisconsin, Upper Michigan, and Iowa.
- Prange Way (De Pere), spun off in 1990 by H.C. Prange Co.; closed 1996
- Schuster's (Milwaukee), bought by Gimbels in 1962
- Shopko (Green Bay), June 2019
- Roth Brothers (Superior), founded pre-1900 as the "Bee Hive Bazaar."

=== Wyoming ===
- Stockgrowers Mercantile Co. (Rock Springs), opened in the 1870s as Tim Kinney and Co.

== See also ==
- List of department stores by country
- List of department stores of the United States
- List of defunct retailers of the United States
- Department store
- Dry goods store
- Five and dime store
- General store
- Hyper market
- Super market
- Super store
- Types of retail outlets

== See also ==
- List of department stores converted to Macy's
