= Coxs =

Coxs may refer to:

- Coxs River, New South Wales, Australia
- Coxs Creek (Belfield, New South Wales), Australia
- Coxs Creek, a creek near Coxs Creek, Kentucky, United States, an unincorporated community
- Coxs Bay, New Zealand

== See also ==
- Cox's, a former department store in Pittsburgh, Pennsylvania, United States
