= Ontario (department store) =

Chain of discount department stores

Ontario Discount Department Store
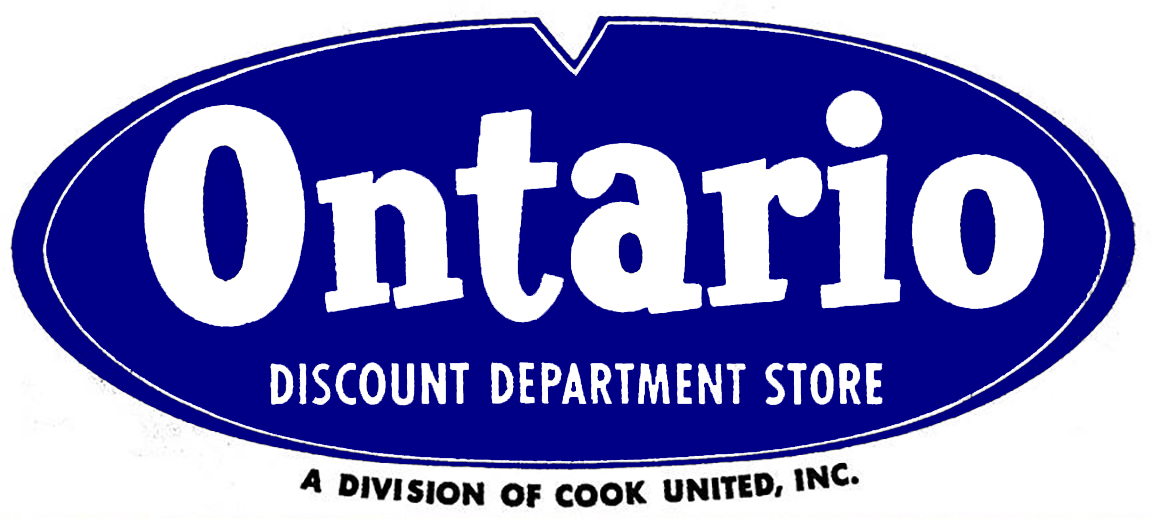
- The second of three Ontario Discount Department Store logos
- Industry: Retail
- Founded: 1950s
- Defunct: December 31, 1987
- Fate: Bankruptcy
- Headquarters: Maple Heights, Ohio, U.S.
- Products: Clothing, footwear, bedding, furniture, jewelry, beauty products, electronics, housewares, groceries
- Parent: Cook United (owned from 1962 and discontinued in 1981)

Ontario Discount Department Store was a chain of discount department stores, which operated primarily in Ohio from the late 1950s into the 1980s. Ontario's parent company, Cook United, discontinued the use of the Ontario brand when it bought the Rink's Bargain Barn chain in 1981. The remaining Ontario stores were rebranded as Rink's or Cooks stores. Cook United closed its remaining stores in 1987.

== History ==
Ontario Super Mart was a Lorain, Ohio-based retail chain that began in the 1950s selling clothing, groceries, hardware, electronics and household goods. In 1964, the nine-store chain was acquired by Cook Coffee Co. of Maple Heights, Ohio, which would become Cook United Inc. Cook United would operate the chain under the name of Ontario Discount Department Stores along with Pick-n-Pay Supermarkets, Uncle Bill's Discount Department Stores, Whitehall's Discount City, and Consolidated Sales Company or CSC Stores. The Ontario chain expanded with stores in Missouri and growth into additional Ohio markets including Toledo. In 1968, Cook United acquired Clark's Department Stores in the United States from the Gamble's chain. Some of the Clark locations were converted to Cooks Discount Department Store. By the 1970s, Ontario operated stores in Cincinnati, Columbus, Cleveland and Dayton.

Because of the acquisitions, Cook United had discount stores in Texas, New Mexico, Florida, North Carolina, Iowa, Illinois, Indiana, Ohio, Pennsylvania, Oklahoma and Kentucky at the start of the 1970s. The company's goal was to reach $1 billion (~$4.51 billion in 2024) in sales and forecasted that it would operate more than 100 stores under its various brand names by 1975.

In 1975, the company had grown to 82 stores and had fallen short of its sales target. Cook United announced it would discontinue Ontario store operations in Missouri. The parent company continued to close stores and had just 23 Ontario stores remaining at the beginning of the 1980s. Cook United acquired Rink's Bargain City, another Ohio-based discount retailer in 1981 to increase its total number of stores to reach its goal of 100 stores and now had reach into Michigan.

=== Bankruptcy and closure ===
In May 1981, the Ontario Discount Department Store nameplate was dropped and 19 Ontario stores were converted to Rink's or Cooks. This effectively ended the Ontario nameplate after more than 20 years of operation. The former Ontario stores operating as Rink's Discount Department Stores did not last much longer. Five Dayton, Ohio, Rink's stores, including two former Ontario locations which had been rebranded for less than a year were closed in December 1981. In 1983 and 1984, Cook United announced 41 further closings including all 14 Cincinnati-area Rink's stores, 8 stores in Columbus and 9 CSC stores in Louisville. Cook United filed for Chapter 11 bankruptcy in October 1984 and, after 19 more store closings, the entire chain was down to 53 stores.

Cook used bankruptcy protection to modernize stores and converted many of them to the Cooks Discount Department Store nameplate. The leaner, Ohio-centered portfolio did not help financial conditions. In May 1987, the company announced it would close 26 of its 29 remaining stores. The remaining three-store chain operated solely under the name of Cooks. Six months later, the corporation announced the closure of the three remaining stores – two in Lima, Ohio, and one in Wausseon, Ohio – just prior to Thanksgiving of 1987. Cook United was liquidated in Chapter 7 bankruptcy.
