= Brown's Department Store =

- Industry: Retail Department store
- Founded: 1912
- Founder: Louis Brown
- Fate: Defunct
- Headquarters: Florida, Dania Beach, U.S.

Brown's Department Store was a chain of department stores in the United States, based in Dania Beach, Florida.

The store's founder, Louis Brown was born in Grodno, Russia in 1886, Louis Brown immigrated to the United States in 1907 and went to work for an uncle in Chicago. From 1909-1910, Louis lived in Jacksonville, Florida working for Charles Blum and Company, a wholesale and retail liquor dealer. In 1910, he headed off to Miami with $250 (~$8,638 in 2025) in his pocket. While at the train stop in Dania Beach, Louis decided to get off because he thought his money would go further there. He started tomato farming before opening a department store in 1912. His first store was located on Main Street, which is now known as Federal Highway or U.S.-1. Louis is thought to be the first known Jewish settler in Broward County. In 1915, he married Sarah Sokolow of New York. Sarah's brother, David, joined them in Dania Beach and partnered with Louis to open additional stores in Hollywood (1925) and Pompano Beach (1927).
