= Swallen's =

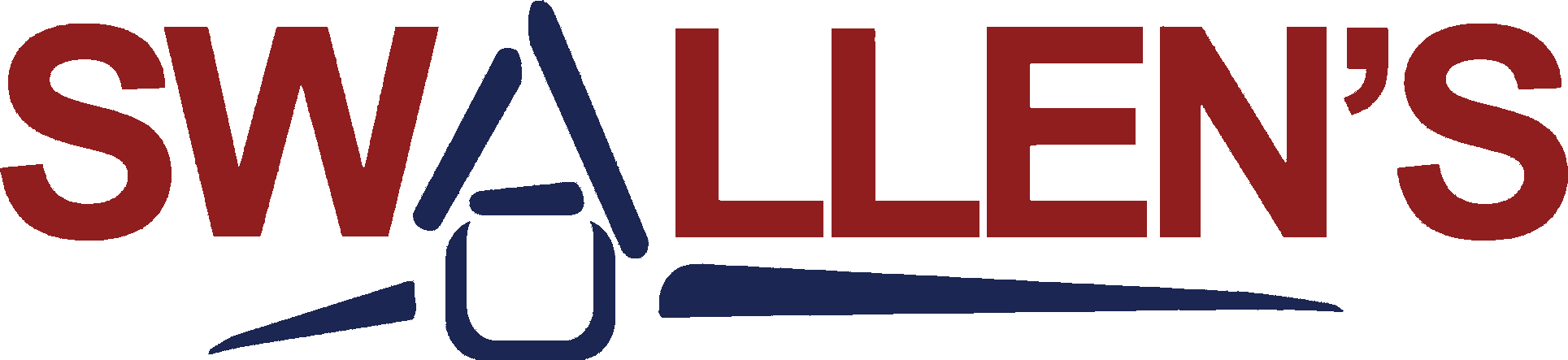
Swallen's logo

Swallen's was a chain of department stores based in Cincinnati, Ohio, United States. The first Swallen's store opened in 1948. The company filed for Chapter 11 bankruptcy in 1995 and all stores were closed by the end of the year.

Each Swallen's store featured all or some mixture of these product categories: appliances, electronics, hardware, sporting goods and firearms, clothing, shoes, pets, cameras, groceries, boats and marine items, automotive, toys, and gasoline.
