= Krauss Building =

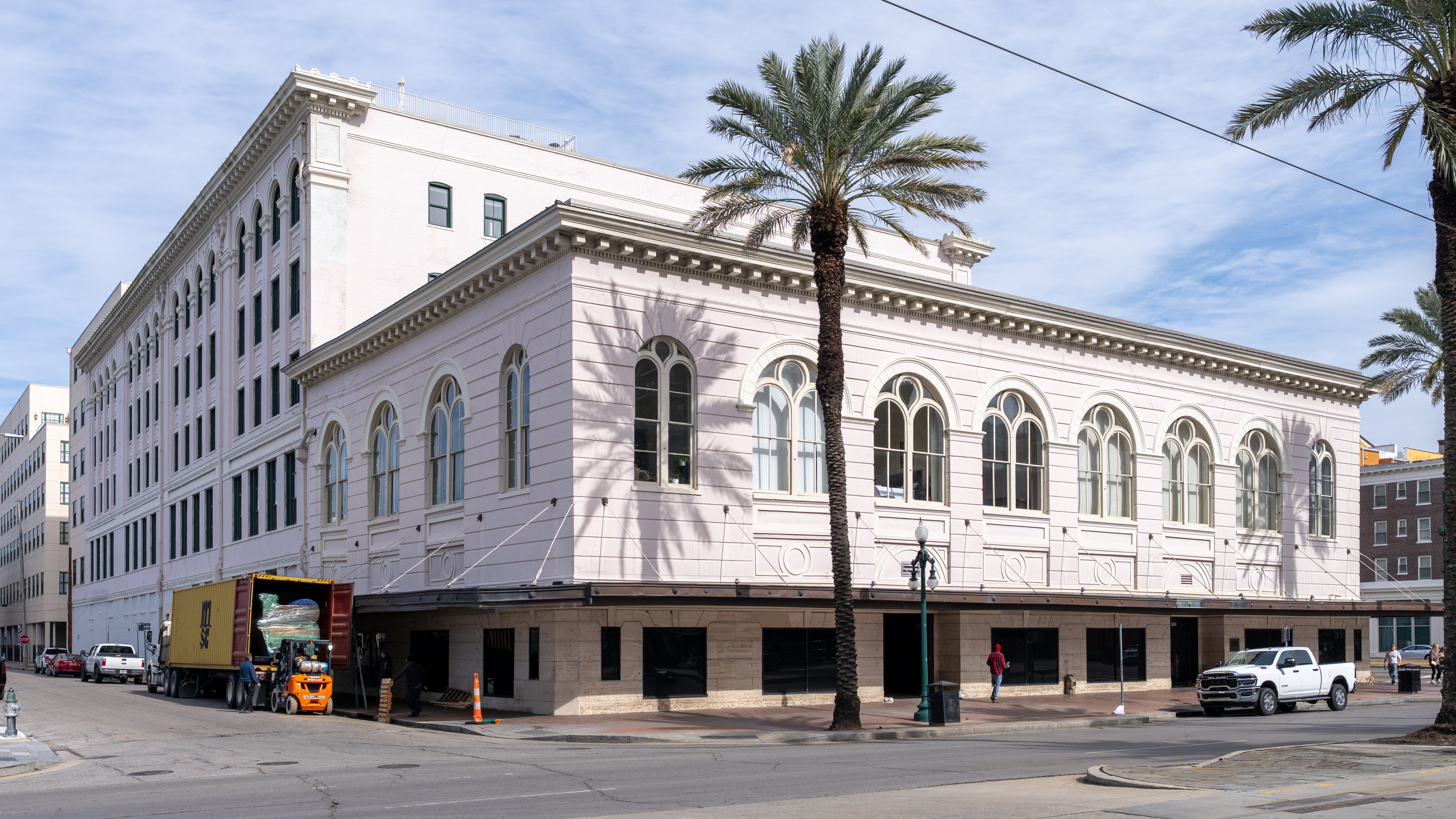
The Krauss building in 2026

29.956514°N 90.07366°W

The Krauss Building is a landmark building in New Orleans, Louisiana, United States, at the downtown lake corner of Canal Street and Basin Street. It housed one of the city's leading department stores for over 90 years. In 2009 it was redeveloped into condominia by Elie Khoury.

In 1903, Krauss Department Store was opened at 1201 Canal Street, New Orleans by Leon Fellman and his nephews, the Krauss brothers—Max, Alfred, Leopold, and Fritz. The building cost $25,000. Because of its location—right on the edge of Storyville—the store sold satin and lace to the ladies of the "District," as it was known. Of course, women from all over the city shopped there, as well. Krauss was the first department store to install air conditioning in 1925 and also the first to have escalators—then known as mechanical stairs. The store survived into the 1990s by stocking obscure items not available at large chains and by refusing to reduce service to its loyal New Orleans customers. It was a monument to the old-fashioned way of doing business, and proud of it. During its 94 years of existence it expanded from 20,000 square feet (1,900 m^{2}) to 350,000 square feet (33,000 m^{2}), all on a real estate parcel of 8.5 acres (34,000 m^{2}) fronting on Canal Street. Krauss closed in 1997.

From the long Formica lunch counter with the round red stools, to the madams and ladies of nearby Storyville who once shopped within the store, the Krauss building enjoys a unique and storied place in New Orleans history.

== Current use ==
This historic building remained vacant for nearly 11 years prior to its resurgence as the first luxury condominium development post-Katrina. Now named 1201 Canal, it houses an upscale community of 233 luxury residences and over 25,000 square feet (2,300 m^{2}) of street-front retail.

== Recent Articles ==
$60m Krauss Building Project in New Orleans
https://web.archive.org/web/20111103001320/http://findarticles.com/p/articles/mi_qn4200/is_20070430/ai_n19066310/

Historic Krauss Building - Good News in New Orleans
http://www.preservationnation.org/magazine/2008/todays-news/good-news-in-new-orleans.html

Krauss Building New Orleans set for Fall Occupancy (2008)
http://www.allbusiness.com/safety-accidents-disasters/disasters-tropical/11485911-1.html
