= Wigwam Stores Inc. =

Chain of discount department stores

Wigwam Stores Inc. was an American chain of discount department stores that was based in Seattle and operated across five states: Washington, Hawaii, Oregon, California and Arizona. The discount department store was a fairly new concept when Wigwam's first store opened in 1946. Wigwam Stores' goal was to sell a wide array of products at a lower cost.

== Founder ==
Homer Powell, the founder of Wigwam Stores, completed college as a history major at Northwest Nazarene College in Nampa, Idaho. While working towards his master's degree at the University of Washington, under the GI bill, he worked at the local YMCA. The pastor at Powell's Nazarene church suggested that he could earn an extra $50 by buying army surplus items, specifically refrigeration machines, and then selling them for a profit. Powell never found the refrigeration machines, but he became acquainted with the Surplus Property Act benefits which allowed veterans preferential access to army surplus, and decided to begin buying and selling.

== History ==
After World War II, there was an over-abundance of army surplus which the army sold to try to offset the enormous cost of the war. As a college student Powell had no means of purchasing the surplus, so he went to his basketball coach at Northwest Nazarene College to get a loan for his business venture. His coach, Lloyd Adler, gave him $500 and became his first partner in business. Powell took the $500 loan and $500 of his own money, purchased $1000 worth of sleeping bags, and sold them for about $11,000.

Powell then found a sale of surplus war planes in Texas. He and his brother-in-law and future business partner, Dallas E. Ortman, went to Texas and purchased a North American T-6 Texan trainer. Powell flew around the country purchasing more army surplus goods, then opened a makeshift store from a 150-foot-long (46 m) tent across the street from the Boeing Company aircraft plant in Seattle. The makeshift store was a hit, and Homer sold about $5000 of goods per day. At the end of the year, the company's net profit was 39 percent.

While Powell's store was operating in Seattle, Washington, Ortman was running a similar army surplus store in Portland, Oregon. Powell told him it would be a good idea to move up to Seattle and open up a second tent store. Ortman loaded up about $6500 worth of goods and traveled up to join Powell. Adler became a partner, and Powell and Adler invested another $6500 to combine with Ortman's goods to make a second store. Wigwam became the name, from the Native American tent dwelling.

Powell and the partners knew that there was a limited amount of army surplus. so they used the profit from their tent stores to build discount department stores. Lillian Titel, a merchant for Bloomingdale's, was hired to do the company's buying, and Wigwam began selling items other than army surplus. Eventually, Titel became one of the top five female buyers in the nation.

== Expansion ==
Powell and his partners followed the advice of employee Marvin Shelby and expanded to Hawaii where Wigwam would have few competitors. They opened their first store in Hawaii in 1958. Shelby was hired to oversee the Hawaiian sector of the company. The store was successful; at Wigwam's peak in Hawaii there were 17 stores: 15 stores on Oahu and two in Hilo. Some of them were called Dodies, a local chain of department stores that Wigwam bought out.

The Wigwam Company used innovative methods to bring in business. In the Hawaiian stores, the company had carnivals in the parking lot and, on a few occasions, the company brought in elephants and other exotic animals to entertain the customers. Wigwam advertised on every medium possible; they ran television and radio commercials, and placed ads and coupons in newspapers and magazines. On one occasion, they hired a local radio disk jockey to break the world record for broadcasting continuously for two weeks from one of the Honolulu stores.

== Poast Trading ==
In 1960, Titel and others suggested that Wigwam should open its own distributing company to cut costs for Wigwam. They opened Poast Trading; Poast is an acronym for each of the partners at the time: Powell, Ortman, Adler, Shelby, and Titel.

== Further expansion ==
Near the end of 1960, Wigwam expanded to Arizona but the state already had a business named Wigwam, which wanted $15,000 (~$124,900 in 2025) for the rights to the name. The partners of Wigwam decided that the name was not worth that much so they decided to call the Arizona store Totem.

The expansion soon made its way into Southern California. At the peak of the southwest division, the Southwest had 25 stores between the two states. In California, the stores that Wigwam took over were Malcum and Webb's. The group decided to keep the names of both stores. There were also some department stores with the name of Wigwam opened in California. After Wigwam moved to the Southwest, the company needed capital to continue the expansion, so it made an initial public offering in the stock market in 1970. Wigwam sold 250,000 shares at ten dollars a share as an "over the counter stock" that was not traded on the New York Stock Exchange.

In 1975, there was a proxy fight within the company. Many of the major investors and one of the original partners, Adler, wanted Wigwam and its sister department stores to open all seven days of the week, including Sunday. Powell was a devout Nazarene and did not want to have his company open on Sundays, so the other four partners decided to buy Adler out of the company. Powell sold the Hawaiian and Seattle sectors of the company to fund the buyout. By that time, Powell was ready to step down as president of the Wigwam business and soon retired.

== End ==
In 1976, one year after the proxy fight and the sale of many stores, Powell stepped down as president and moved to Phoenix, but still oversaw the Phoenix division. Titel became president and CEO with the company's main stores in California and Arizona. In 1977, one of the largest remaining stores, Glendale, California, burned to the ground. There were no injuries, but the store and its contents were completely destroyed and the loss cost the company millions of dollars. The Glendale location had been one of the more profitable stores. Soon after the fire, Titel stepped down from the presidency. Monty Ortman, manager of the Arizona division and son of Dallas Ortman, assumed the position, and soon he sold off the rest of the company and split the considerable profits with the remaining partners and shareholders.
