= Rosenberg's Department Store =

- U.S. National Register of Historic Places
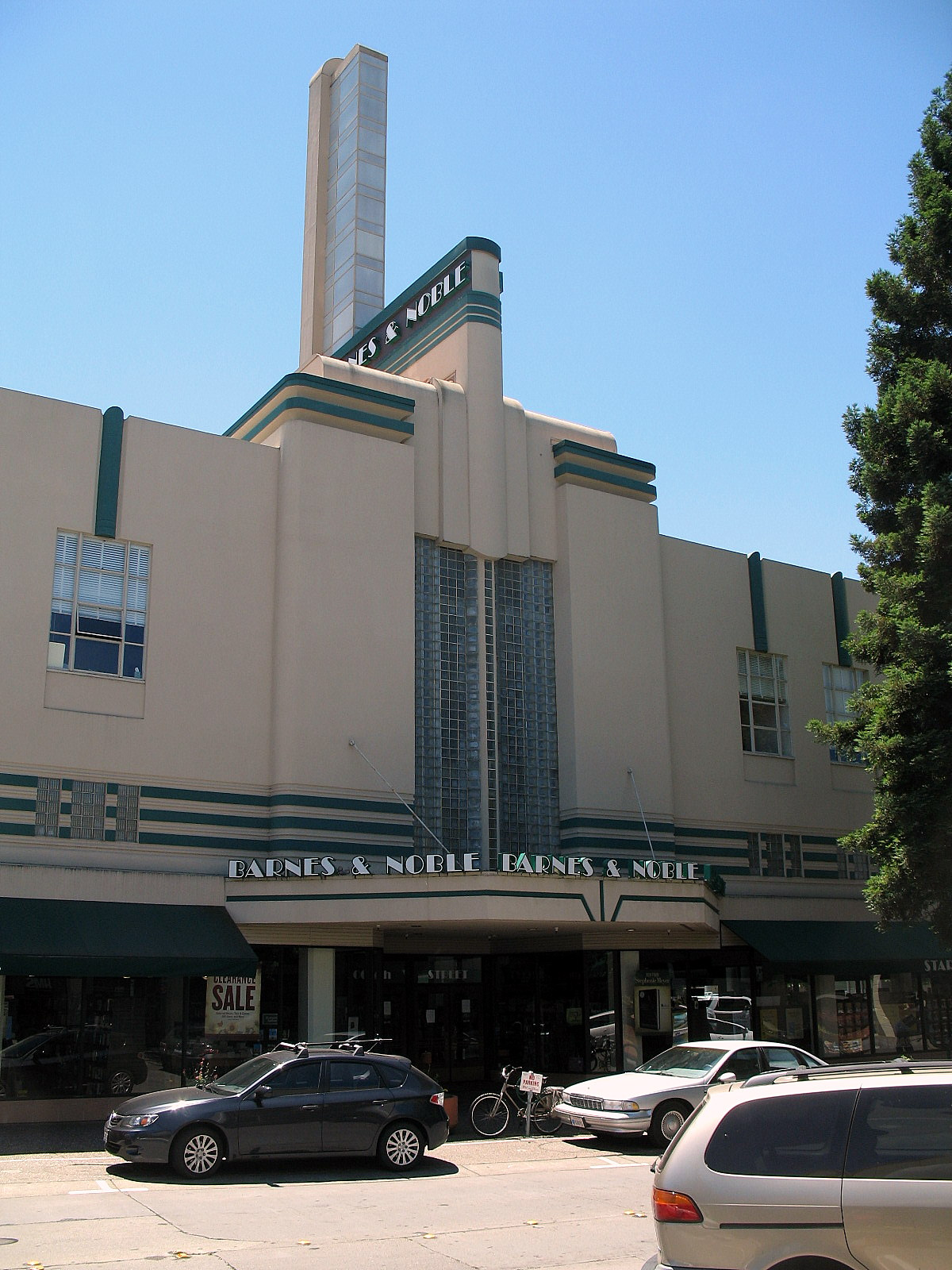
- Rosenberg's, now a Barnes & Noble bookstore

- Location within California Location within the United States
- Location: 700 Fourth St., Santa Rosa, California
- Coordinates: 38°26′28″N 122°42′40″W
- Area: 1.6 acres (0.65 ha)
- Built: 1937
- Built by: Moore & Roberts
- Architects: William Howard Knowles; Wayne S. Hertzka
- Architectural style: Moderne
- NRHP reference No.: 94001497
- Added to NRHP: December 29, 1994

Rosenberg's Department Store is located at Fourth and D Streets in downtown Santa Rosa, California. The structure is the most significant example of the Streamline Moderne style in Santa Rosa, and was the tallest building in the city for many years.

== History ==
The store was planned to replace a 1907 store owned by Max and Fred Rosenberg that burned in 1936. The design for the new store was carried out by Hertzka and Knowles of San Francisco in 1936, and construction by contractors Moore and Roberts started on January 19, 1937. The store opened on October 27, 1937, along with the Purity grocery store in a one-story section.

A model of the building was shown as "an exemplar of future architectural technology" at the 1939 San Francisco World's Fair.

In 1951 Joseph Edward McNeany purchased Rosenberg's for $1.5 million (~$14.9 million in 2025). The store was substantially renovated and expanded in 1964. After modernizing the three-story store it was merged in 1966 with Aldens Inc., a Chicago-based mail order and retail sales subsidiary of Gambel-Skogmo. Under terms of the agreement, McNeany stayed on as a consultant and his son, William, became vice president and general manager of Rosenberg's. It closed in 1988 and was vacant until 1994. That year, the Art Deco Society of California recognized the structure with its Preservation Award in 1988 to encourage the building's owners to save the structure.

The city government approved demolition of the store in 1994, but it was subsequently saved when bookstore chain Barnes & Noble leased the space. The building was placed on the National Register of Historic Places on December 29, 1994.

== Description ==
Rosenberg's is a two-story structure measuring about 140 feet (43 m) by 120 feet (37 m), with an attached 126-foot (38 m) by 108-foot (33 m) one-story section. The front is dominated by an Art Moderne style marquee and sign that extends beyond the roof, with the main entrance under the marquee. The steel-framed structure is clad with stucco-covered cast in place concrete. The lower level features continuous plate glass display windows, with a curved corner above set apart by string courses or "speed lines", inset with glass block clerestory windows. Large punched openings with keystone-like vertical stripes define the second floor bays. The marquee section is defined by flanking pylons embracing a tall, glass block window whose surface undulates. A fin or "blade sign" rises from the top of the window to about 10 feet (3.0 m) above the roof, where it originally carried neon lettering advertising the store. A taller fin is set back and rises much higher, to 50 feet (15 m) above the roof. It is translucent, and was internally lighted with green neon. The one-story section is much plainer, with a continuous canopy across the front. The entrance to this section is marked by two arches in the canopy.

The interior has a high-ceilinged section overlooked by a mezzanine. Interior columns have capitals resembling Egyptian prototypes. The mezzanine and stair railings are slender horizontal bars with birch handrails.
