= Hoff Department Store =

- U.S. National Register of Historic Places
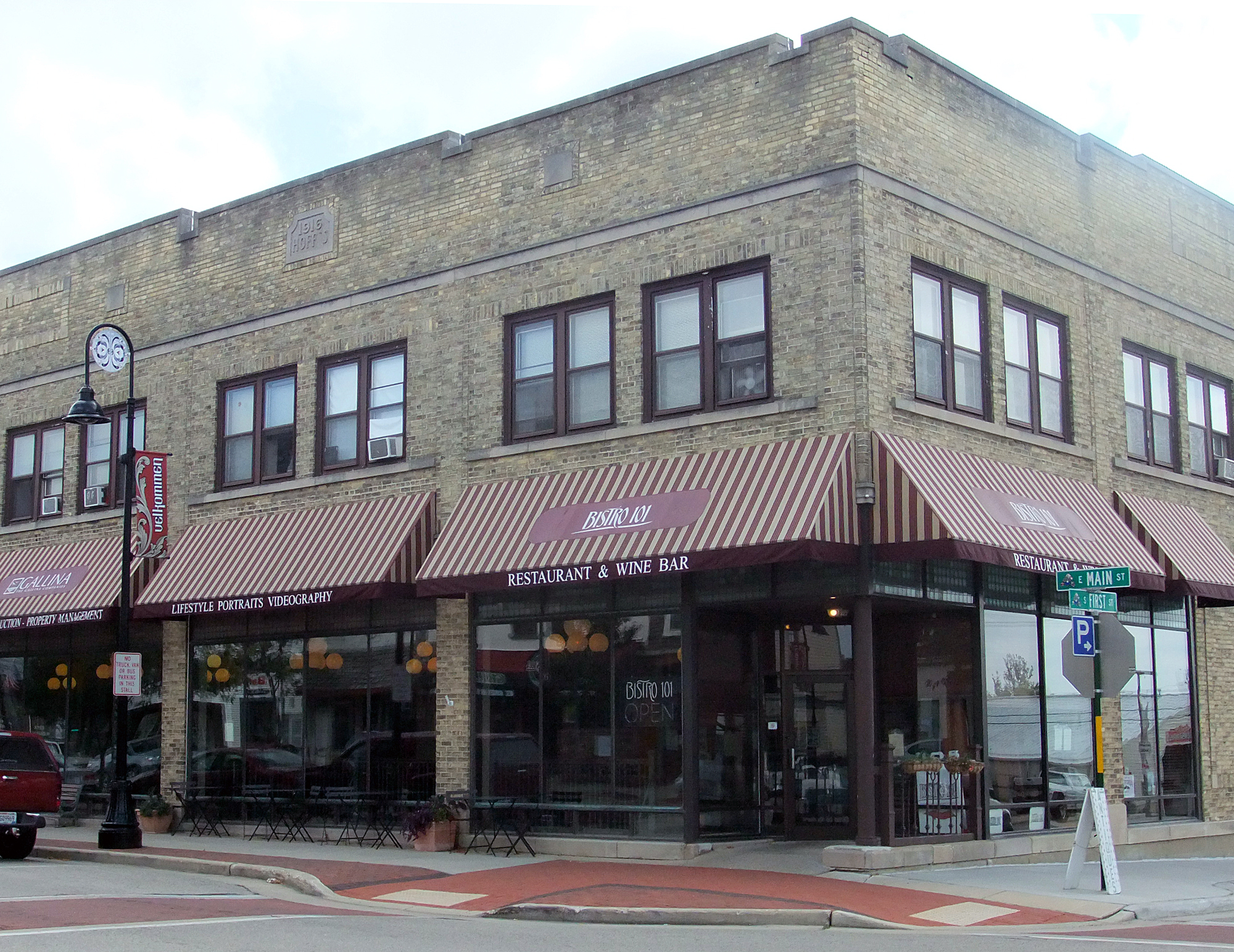
- Hoff Department Store
- Location: 101--103 Main St., Mount Horeb, Wisconsin
- Coordinates: 43°00′30″N 89°44′16″W
- Area: less than one acre
- Built: 1916
- Architect: Martin P. Schneider
- Architectural style: Commercial Style
- NRHP reference No.: 89000005
- Added to NRHP: February 14, 1989

The Hoff Department Store is a 1916 Commercial-style building that spans a full block of Mount Horeb, Wisconsin's Main Street.

== History ==
In 1866, George Burrows established a one-story general store at "The Corners." It was the first business in the area, and served the rural community with food, hardware, clothes, and a post office for years. But in 1881 the railroad built a depot southwest of the Corners. In response, the Burrows store was moved, along with most of the other businesses, closer to the depot, to the site now occupied by the Hoff store.

In 1887 Norwegian immigrant Andrew Hoff and his brother-in-law Adolph Elver bought the Burrows store, and operated it for years. But the community continued to grow. In 1905 Hoff expanded the store, and from 1916 to 1917 he completely rebuilt it to the large brick building that stands today. The store remained in operation until 1984.

In 1989, the building was added to the State and the National Register of Historic Places.
