= J. M. Fields =

American discount store chain

J.M. Fields
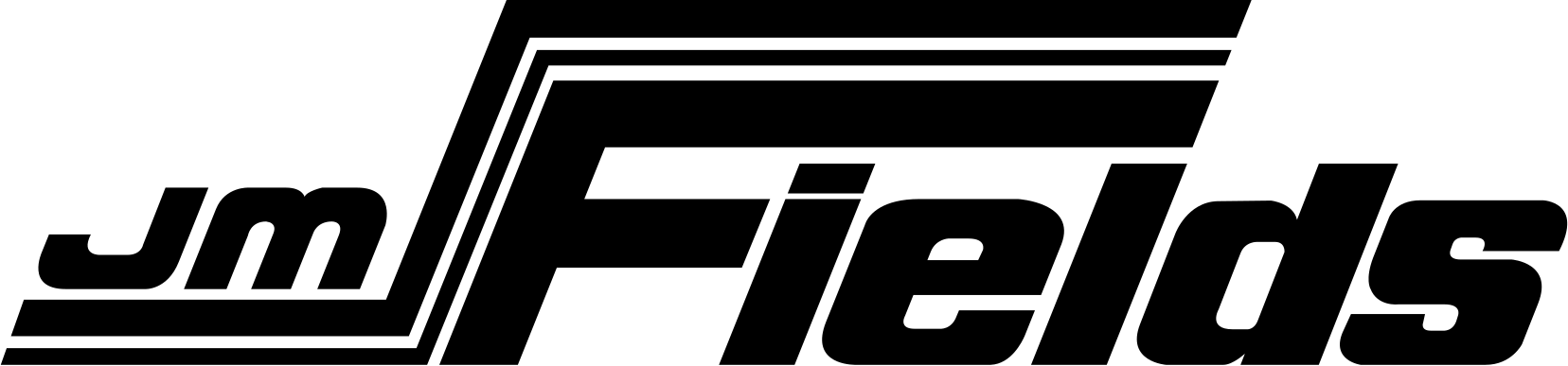
- Industry: Department store
- Founder: Phillip Feldman
- Defunct: 1978; 48 years ago
- Fate: Bankruptcy
- Headquarters: Salem, Massachusetts, United States
- Number of locations: ≈50 (1961)
- Area served: Eastern United States
- Parent: Food Fair

J. M. Fields price label attached to a purse

J.M. Fields was a discount department store chain based in Salem, Massachusetts.

The chain expanded rapidly in the early 1960s from a regional New England enterprise, opening stores along the entire eastern seaboard from Maine to Florida. Food Fair Corporation purchased the growing J.M. Fields business in 1961, and in 1965 the home office was moved from Boston to Food Fair corporate headquarters in Philadelphia.

The original name of these stores was Enterprise Stores in the early 1900s. The chain was founded by Phillip Feldman of Massachusetts and his partner Samuel Glass. The name J. M. Fields came about when his son, Joseph M. Feldman, decided to use a name not aligned with any political, cultural, religious, or country culture. Joseph took over the stores in the early 1950s along with Hy Glass and George Glass. They saw the need for expansion. By 1961, there were approximately fifty stores. Most of these newer stores were built around large parking lots, among the first of their kind, similar to today's popular shopping configurations.

Most new J.M. Fields stores were built adjacent to Food Fair stores, and the two were in fact connected, making J.M. Fields the first true "supercenter" of its time. Customers could walk from the department store directly into the grocery store without having to go outside. J.M. Fields featured a mix of merchandise found in most of today's modern-day discount retailers, such as housewares, clothing, sporting goods, electronics, and lawn and garden items. Many locations had a free-standing automotive center in the parking lot.

Classic logo

When parent company Food Fair filed for bankruptcy in 1978, all J.M. Fields and Pantry Pride stores ceased operations and were shuttered. Many former J.M. Fields locations in the Northeast became either Kmart, Jefferson Ward (later Bradlees), or Caldor stores. Kmart also took over many Southern stores.
