= Yankee (department store) =

Defunct American discount store chain

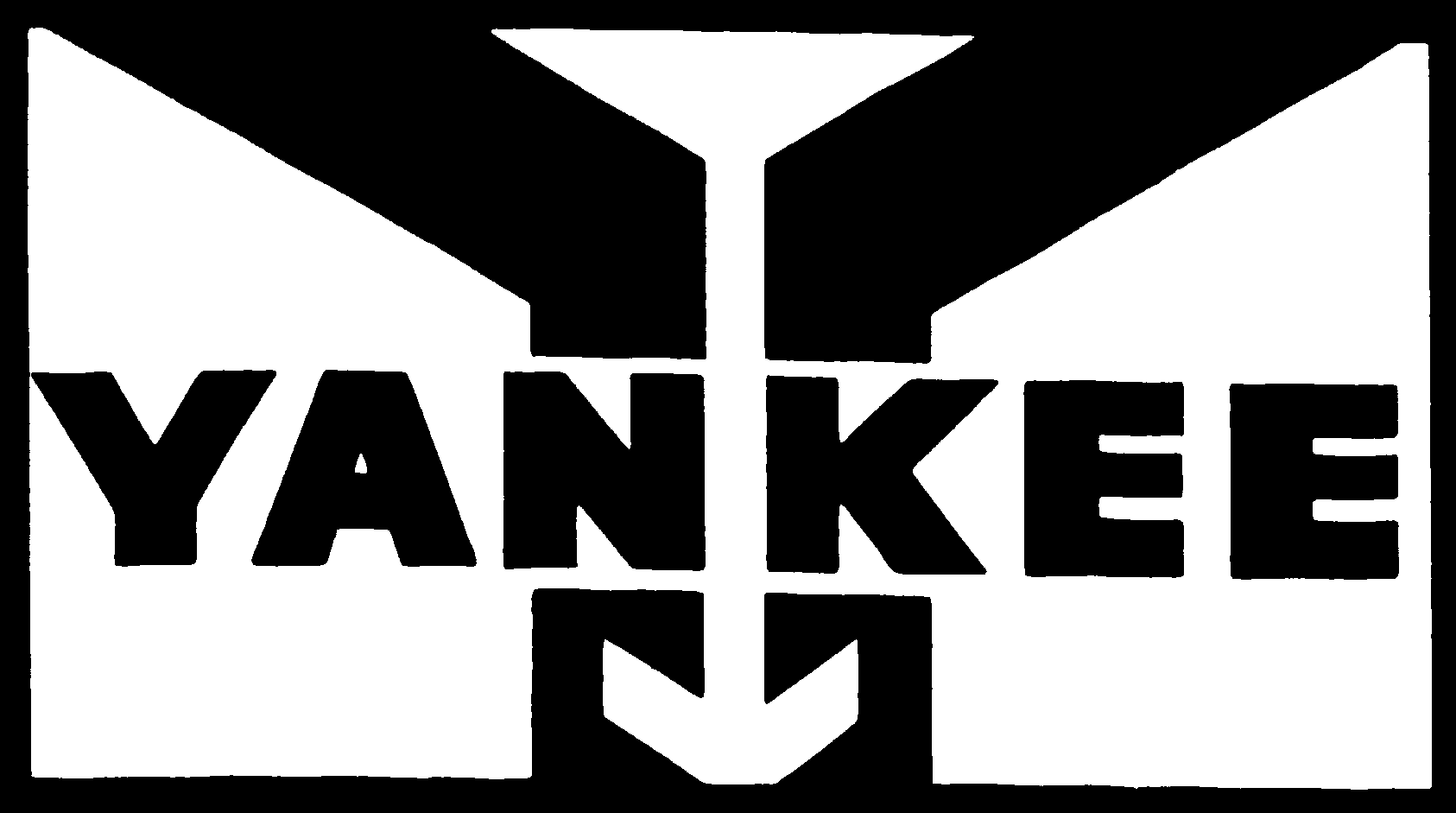
- Type: formerly: Private
- Industry: Retail
- Founded: Flint, Michigan
- Founder: Joseph Megdell, Wilbert Roberts
- Defunct: 1974
- Fate: Purchased by Zody's
- Headquarters: Flint, Michigan, United States
- Number of locations: 20+ at peak
- Area served: Flint, Michigan-Saginaw, Michigan area
- Products: General merchandise

Yankee was an American discount department store chain begun in Flint, Michigan. Partners Joseph Megdell and Wilbert Roberts opened their first store in 1948 to sell military surplus under the name U.S. Surplus. By 1964, it had become a discount chain with 21 stores throughout southeastern Michigan, primarily around Flint. Many of its locations were paired with local supermarket chain Hamady Brothers. Some larger stores, including those in Lansing and Bay City, were called Yankee Stadium.

Megdell and Roberts sold the chain to Borman Foods, then-parent of Farmer Jack supermarkets, in 1965. Borman unsuccessfully expanded the chain into Metro Detroit, closing those stores by 1971. Many of the Detroit stores were sold to Shoppers Fair. In 1972, Borman sold the Yankee chain to California-based Zody's. Zody's closed its Michigan operations in 1974 as part of the chain's bankruptcy proceedings.
