= Orr's =

- Industry: Retail
- Defunct: 1993
- Fate: Bankruptcy
- Headquarters: Easton, Pennsylvania; Bethlehem, Pennsylvania
- Key people: Matthew Orr
- Products: Clothing, footwear, jewelry, cosmetics, and housewares.

Orr's was a department store located in downtown Bethlehem, Pennsylvania.

== Overview ==
Orr's of Easton was begun by Matthew Orr and later sold to the Bixlers. In 1955, Orr's was opened in Bethlehem when the Bush & Bull store closed after operating in that location from 1908. Lerch & Rice Co. operated a store in the same location from 1821 to 1908.

In the 1970s, Bethlehem's downtown was declining, similar to that of neighboring Allentown and Easton. The block of W. Broad Street was closed off from Guetter Street to N. New Street to create an outdoor pedestrian mall. This plan failed and was re-opened as a street. Bethlehem's downtown had continued to struggle, and in 1993, Orr's of Bethlehem closed. The building was renovated into an indoor mall, Main Street Commons. The parking deck adjacent to Orr's was kept and is still in use for the mall today. The Easton location also closed and was renovated to The Crayola Factory and Two Rivers Landing. Orr's locations were the following, all of which were closed:

- Bethlehem, 559 Main Street, Bethlehem, Pennsylvania
- Easton, 306 Northampton Street, Easton, Pennsylvania
- Phillipsburg, Hillcrest Mall, Phillipsburg, New Jersey
- Chester, 179 Rt. 206, Chester, New Jersey
- Flemington, Flemington, New Jersey
