= Danners =

Danners, Inc. was a company based in Indianapolis, Indiana, USA, that operated retail and restaurant outlets. Its largest, and oldest, division was the Danners 5 & 10 chain of five and dime stores, which it sold off in 1985.

Danners also operated at least thirteen Cambridge Inn Cafeterias and "Trolley Stop Cafes", one Danner Bros. Restaurant and danners!, the company's frame, stationery and crafts store. The variety stores, restaurants and frame and craft stores were sold off in 1985 to executive Jay Danner in an effort to save the 3-D discount chain. The new company was called Danner Brothers Co. 3-D stood for "Danner's Discount Department Store".

In 1986, 3D Discount had 35 locations throughout Indiana, Illinois and Michigan.

In 1987, Indian L.P. offered to purchase all outstanding shares of Danners, Inc. that it did not already own. It was then merged into the Maxway Corp., which filed Chapter 11 bankruptcy in 1988. When Maxway emerged from bankruptcy in 1989, the Danners, Inc division was listed as defunct. Maxway operated the Macks Stores chain of stores.

== Divisions ==
- Danners 5 & 10
- 3D Discount
- Cambridge Inn Cafeterias
- Tolley Stop Cafe
- Danner Bros. Restaurant
- danners!'
