= Peoples (store) =

Peoples Store Co. Inc.
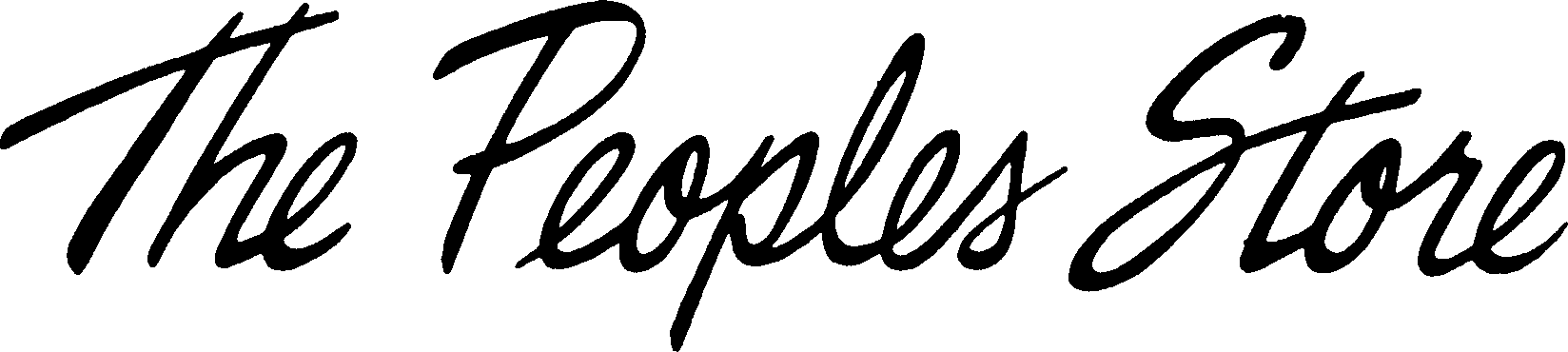
- Company type: Department store
- Industry: Retail
- Founded: 1888 Tacoma, Washington
- Defunct: 1984
- Headquarters: Tacoma, Washington
- Products: Clothing, footwear, bedding, furniture, jewelry, beauty products, and housewares.

Classic logo

Peoples, originally known as The Peoples Store Co., is a defunct chain of department stores once located in the southern and western Puget Sound area of Washington. Founded in 1888 in downtown Tacoma, by 1894 they opened their first branch store in Olympia. In January 1896 they opened their new flagship store at the corner of Pacific and 11th Street in Tacoma, which was the main intersection of downtown at the time. With 5 floors and 50 departments, it was claimed to be the largest and finest department store in the Pacific Northwest at the time. That store would later be expanded to the south in 1957.

Peoples continued to expand in the early 1940s by operating a chain of appliance stores called Electric City in many Puget Sound cities. Many of these stores would later be expanded to include apparel and would be rebranded under the Peoples name. By 1948 there were twelve stores in the Peoples chain. By 1968, the chain had consolidated its 12 small stores into seven larger regional stores. The new stores anchored several malls as well as stand-alone locations in downtown areas.

The chain was shut down by its parent company, Mercantile Stores, in early 1984 after years of declining profits. The flagship Tacoma store was remodeled and renamed Puget Sound Plaza and currently houses offices and a Key Bank branch.
