= Lauerman Brothers Department Store =

- U.S. National Register of Historic Places
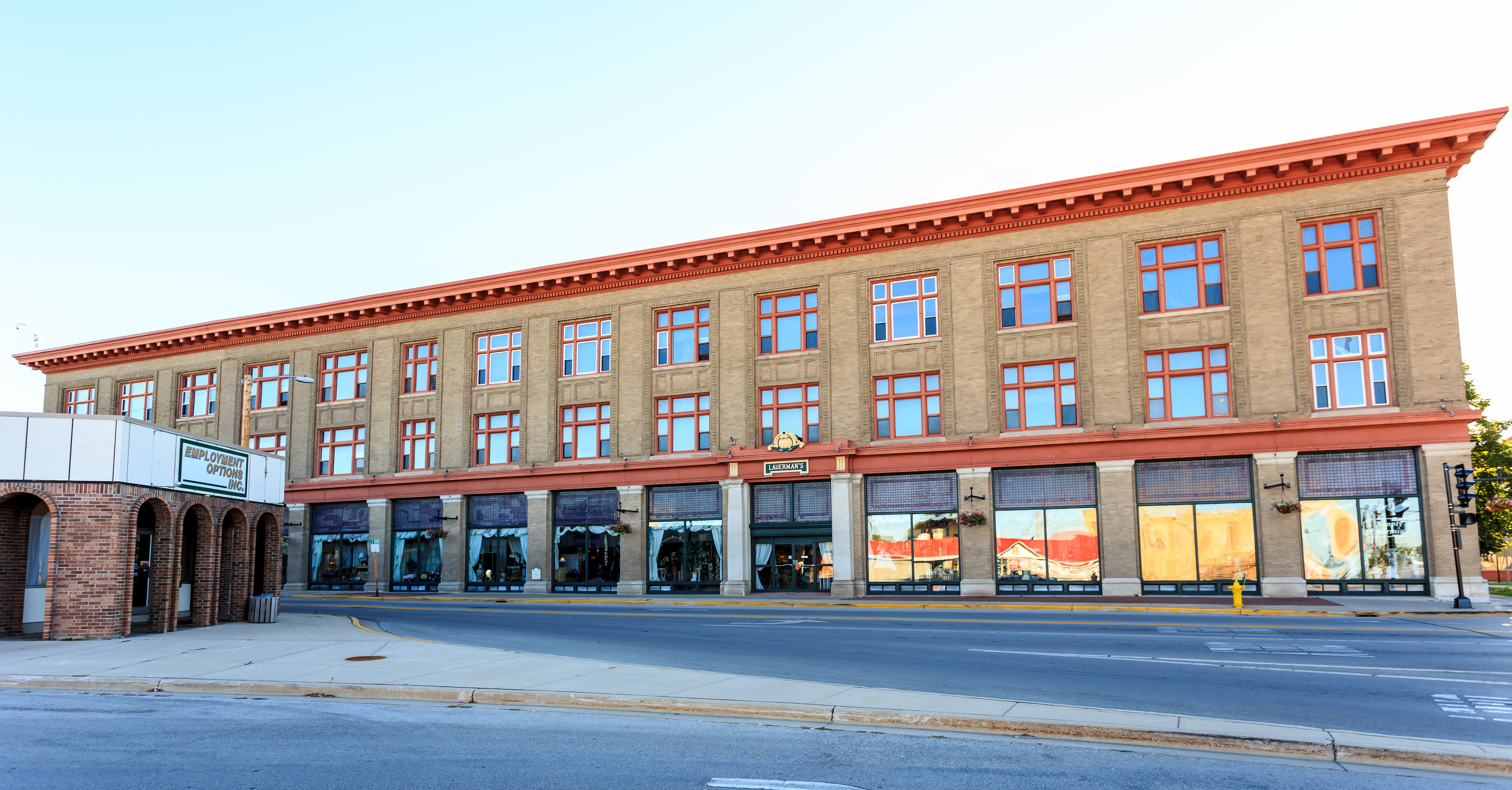

- Location within Wisconsin Location within the United States
- Location: 1701--1721 Dunlap Sq., Marinette, Wisconsin
- Coordinates: 45°5′58″N 87°37′51″W
- Area: less than one acre
- Built: 1884
- Architectural style: Classical Revival, Italianate
- NRHP reference No.: 92000027
- Added to NRHP: February 24, 1992

Lauerman Brothers Department Store was a department store chain in the early 20th century. Its flagship store in Marinette, Wisconsin is a registered historic place. The chain consisted of 13 stores in Wisconsin, Michigan, and Iowa.

In 2013 the Wisconsin Historical Society Press published a history of the chain titled "Something for Everyone: Memories of Lauerman Brothers Department Store" by Michael Leannah. (ISBN 0870205811)
