= Shoppers Fair =

American discount store chain

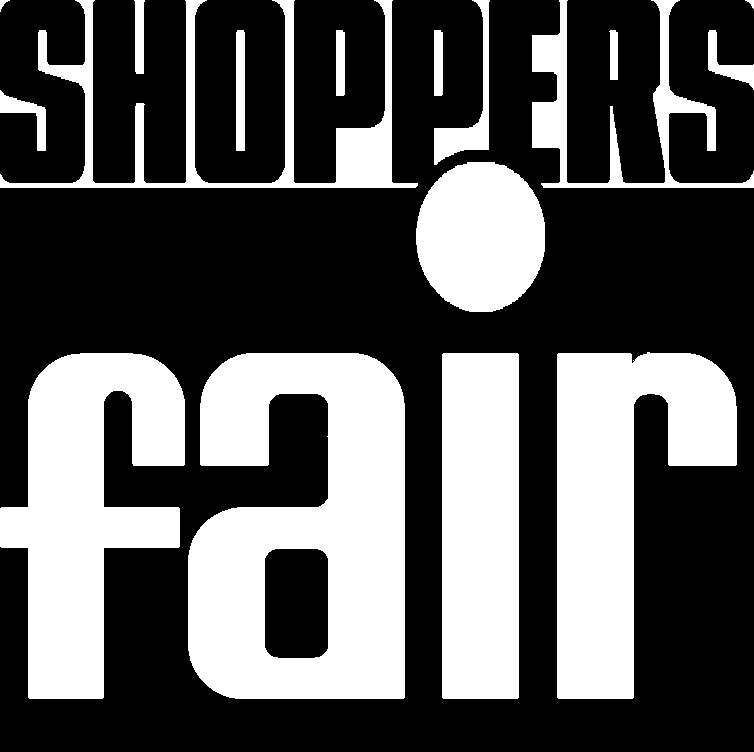
- Industry: Retail
- Founded: 1956 in Bridgeport, Connecticut
- Defunct: 1975
- Fate: Chapter 11 bankruptcy
- Area served: Northeastern and Midwestern United States

Shoppers Fair was an American discount department store chain. It was founded in 1956 in Bridgeport, Connecticut and owned by New York City-based Mangel, but primarily operated in the state of Michigan. The chain closed the last of its stores in 1975.

== History ==
Shoppers Fair was founded in 1956 with a store in Bridgeport, Connecticut. By 1962, the chain was a subsidiary of New York-based Mangel and operated thirty-five stores in twelve states, with nine of those thirty-five being located in Michigan. In 1971, Shoppers Fair reached an agreement with Borman's Inc., owner of the Yankee Stores chain, to acquire eight stores closed by Yankee in the metro Detroit area due to unprofitability. One of the eight, in Roseville, had never opened for business as Yankee.

The Shoppers Fair chain was part of two lawsuits: one in 1960 against a department store in Flint, Michigan called The Fair, and another four years later against an owner of an IGA store in Fort Smith, Arkansas also called Shoppers Fair. Both cases ruled in the other stores' favors.

Mangel filed for Chapter 11 bankruptcy in March 1974. At the time, the company had 46 Shoppers Fair stores and 94 Mangels clothing stores.

By December 1974, all of the Detroit stores were closed, and by 1975, the ten remaining stores in the chain had gone out of business as well.
