= Neisner's =

Defunct American variety store chain

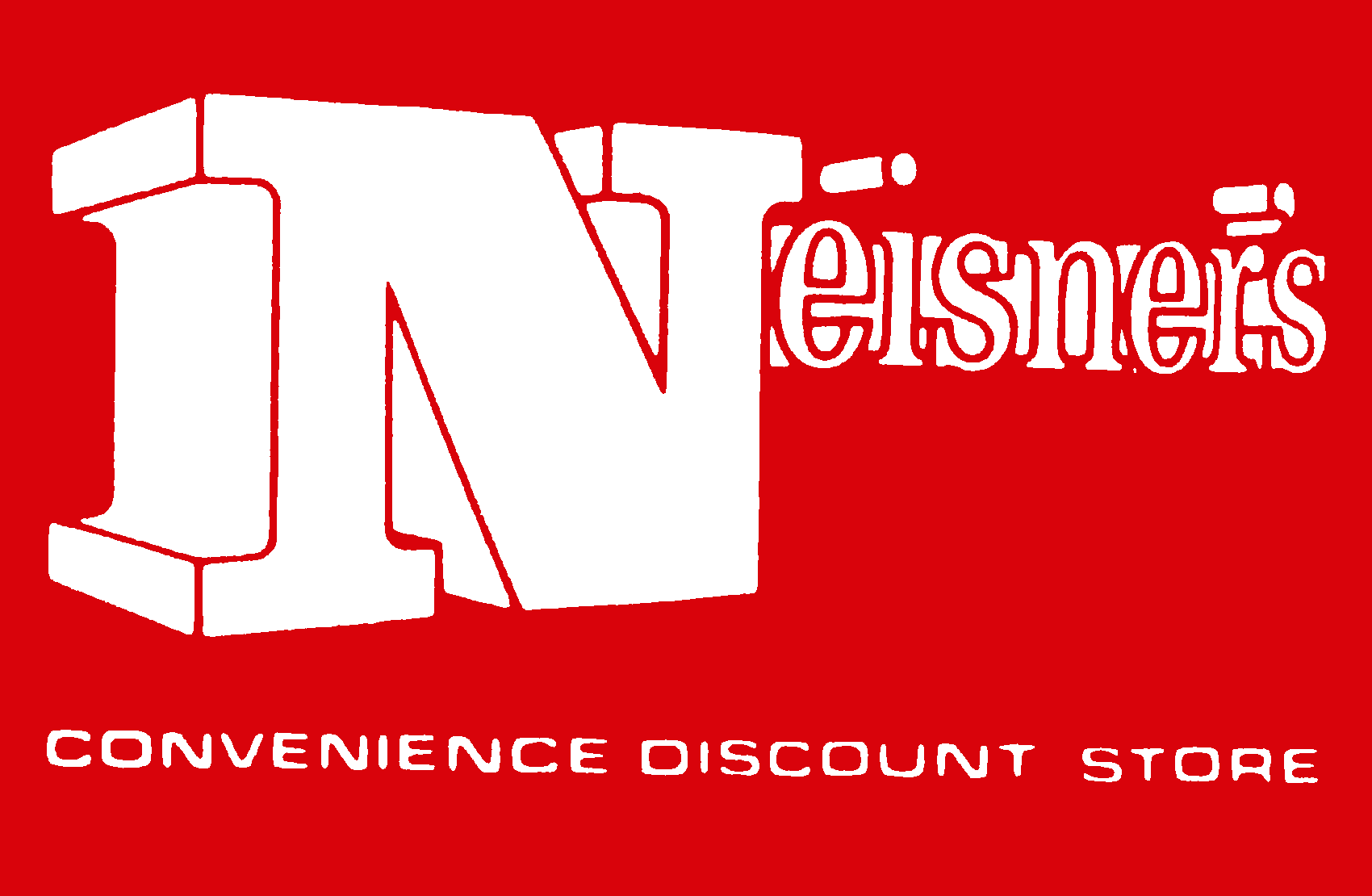
- Type: Variety store
- Industry: Retail
- Founded: 1911; 115 years ago
- Founder: Abraham and Joseph Neisner
- Defunct: 1978; 48 years ago
- Fate: Acquired by Ames
- Headquarters: Rochester, New York, United States
- Brands: Neisner's; Neisner Brothers; Big N

Neisner's or Neisner Brothers was a chain of variety stores in North America.

== History ==
The brothers Abraham and Joseph Neisner opened their first variety store in Rochester, New York, in 1911. They incorporated the company in New York in 1916, by which time they had five stores, selling merchandise from 5 cents to one dollar. The company acquired a large interest in British Home Stores, a chain of similar stores in the United Kingdom in 1929, but sold its interest in the late 1930s.

The company prospered during the Depression, and by 1935, Neisner's had 103 stores in 63 cities in 16 states.

Abraham Neisner died in 1933, whilst travelling aboard the SS Rex. Neisner's was later headed by Joseph's son Fred Neisner, who became chairman of the board, with Abraham's son Melvin Neisner, as company president.

During the 1960s and '70s, the company created the Big N division, a format which resembled the big box stores of today. These were located primarily in New York and several other northeastern states.

Neisner's petitioned for bankruptcy protection on 1 December 1977 and the Ames Department Stores acquired the chain in November 1978. GC Murphy moved into several of the former Big N stores with its Murphy's Mart format including one in Mount Vernon, Ohio.
