= Uncle Bill's =

Uncle Bill's was a chain of stores in the Greater Cleveland area. It was founded in 1955 by Sidney Axelrod as a discount store. In 1961, the store added clothing and furniture to become a full discount department store.

The store catered to young 1960s consumers, filling the economic spaces previously held by downtown department stores.

The store was sold to Cook United (then the Cook Coffee Company) in 1961.
