= Cox's =

Pennsylvania department store

- Company type: Department Store
- Founded: McKeesport, Pennsylvania 1955
- Defunct: 1983
- Fate: Closed
- Number of locations: 8
- Key people: Robert Cox

Cox's was a department store in Pittsburgh, Pennsylvania. With a four-story flagship store in the downtown business district of McKeesport, Pennsylvania, Cox's had seven retail stores in shopping malls throughout the Pittsburgh area.

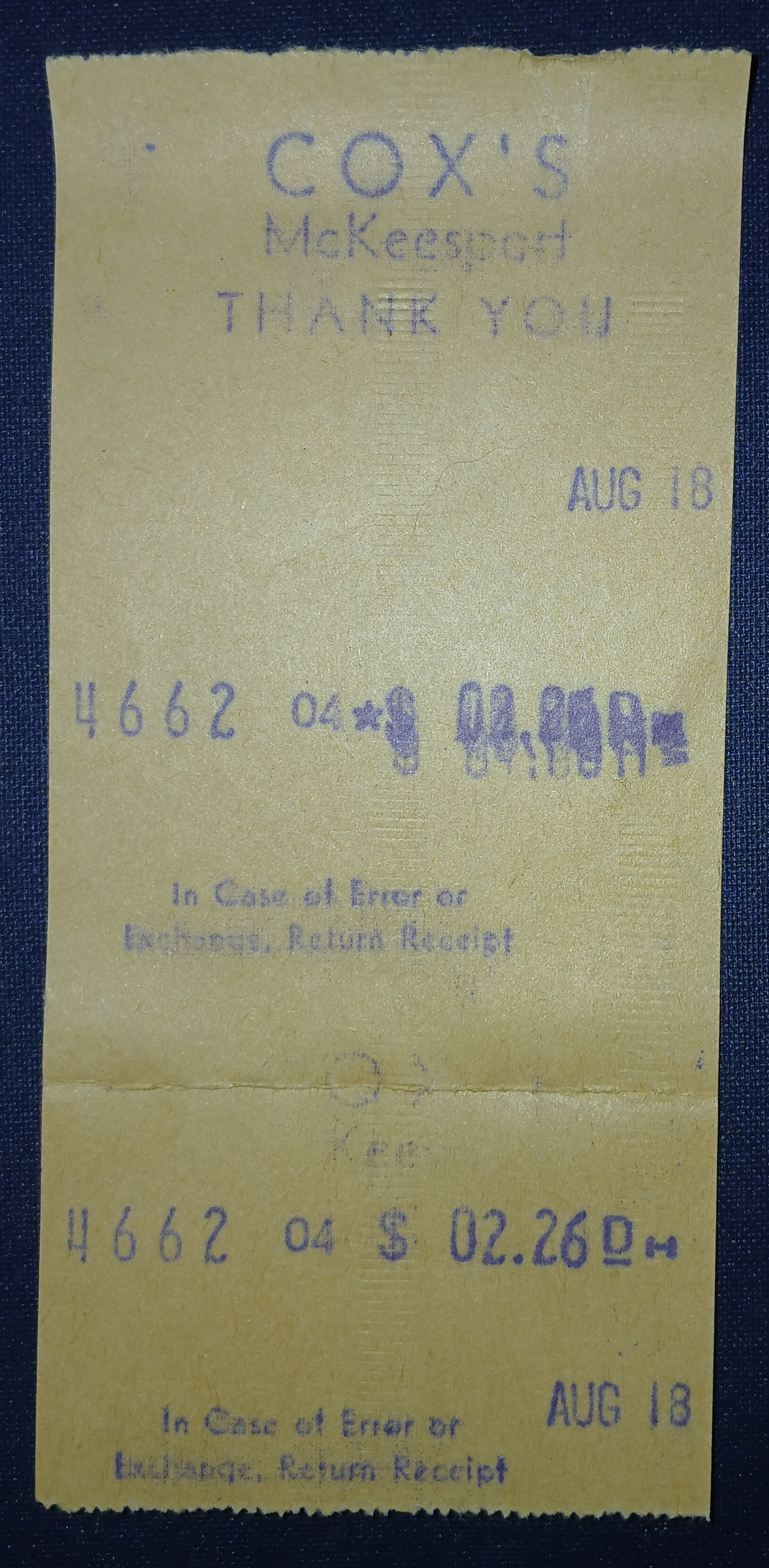
Store Receipt 1950s

== History ==
Cox's was the successor to a small seamstress shop established in 1884 by Mary Ann Cox in McKeesport, Pennsylvania. By the 1950s, the operation had grown so much that Robert Cox, grandson of Mary Ann, purchased the White Opera house at the corner of Fifth Avenue and Walnut Street in the downtown business district of McKeesport and demolished it to build a flagship department store. The modern four-story department store, built in the International Style, opened in 1955. A large concrete medallion of William Shakespeare that had served as a centerpiece of the opera house was retained and displayed on the lower level of the department store.

During the 1970s, there were seven additional locations in shopping malls throughout the Pittsburgh area. The flagship store was expanded. However, by the early 1980s, an economic recession in the Pittsburgh area had resulted in an unemployment rate of 22.8 percent. On November 2, 1982, the company filed for bankruptcy. After sitting vacant for over a decade, the flagship store in McKeesport was demolished in 1994.

== See also ==
- List of defunct department stores of the United States
