= Muir's Department Store =

Coordinates: 40.7667°N 74.2181°W

- Company type: Retail
- Industry: Clothing, household items
- Founded: 1882 (144 years ago) in East Orange, New Jersey, U.S.
- Defunct: 1980s
- Headquarters: East Orange, New Jersey, U.S.
- Parent: R.H. Muir Company

Muir's Department Store was an American retail store; in the 1920s, it was the largest in the Main Street shopping district in the downtown area. It was located at the corner of Main and Prospect Streets in East Orange, New Jersey. The store is now defunct.

In 1882, the R.H. Muir Company (the store's official parent company), founded Muir's Department Store, which became the flagship store of the large East Orange retail district along Main Street. At the time, East Orange was referred to as having the first "suburban" retail district in New Jersey and was also home to a large branch of the upscale Fifth Avenue department store company, Best & Co.

A second retail district in East Orange ran along Central Avenue, and this area was home to branches of B. Altman and Company as well as Franklin Simon.

Muir's was a department store that featured designer and couture clothing departments for women, named "Miss Muir" and "Lady Muir", respectively. The store featured over 100,000-square-foot (9,300 m^{2}) street floor, and three smaller upper floors with store departments that sold household goods, including a furniture department.

Muir's went through a number of ownership changes in the 1970s before finally shutting down in the early 1980s.

The Muir's Department Store buildings were last used to house a flea market before the main structure was destroyed in a fire. A couple of adjunct buildings did, however, remain intact afterward, the Muir's label remaining visible on their facades to this day.
