= Sunny's Surplus =

Chain of surplus stores in the eastern United States

Sunny's Surplus (formerly known as Sunny's Great Outdoors and Sunny's: The Affordable Outdoor Store) was, at its peak, a chain of 29 surplus stores in Maryland, Virginia, Pennsylvania and Delaware. The chain was founded in 1948 by Sidney Weinman to sell World War II surplus. The name Sunny's is from the first store manager. The first store was located at East Baltimore and Frederick Streets in Baltimore, Maryland. It later added camping gear and in 1990 renamed itself Sunny's The Affordable Outdoor Store.

The chain also carried Cub Scouts and Boy Scouts uniforms, badges and equipment.

== Recent history ==
In 2000, Sunny's filed for Chapter 11 protection in U.S. Bankruptcy Court and emerged 13 months later.

In early January 2007, Sunny's began liquidation sales as it prepared to close down all of its locations after the Elkridge-based company filed for Chapter 11 bankruptcy for the second time in a decade. March 16, 2007, marked the final day in which the company's remaining stores (a handful of stores up until this point had closed) were open for business.

In late October and early November 2007, Sunny's reopened its doors with three Maryland stores, in Annapolis, Westminster, and Frederick. These stores were again closed in late March 2008.

Sunny's was a Baltimore landmark and has appeared in Barry Levinson's movie Liberty Heights and show Homicide: Life on the Street. The chain's "dog in the gas mask" commercial was awarded a Clio. At the end of March 2008, Sunny's Surplus closed its remaining physical stores.

In September 2022, Lyfe Rocks Multimedia (LRM) acquired the rights to Sunny’s Surplus and announced plans to relaunch the brand as an e-commerce store. The website will soon be operated by LRM under the name Sunny’s Surplus Online, based in Baltimore, Maryland.
