= Arlan's =

American discount store chain

- Industry: Retail
- Founded: 1945; 81 years ago
- Founder: William Palestine; Herbert Palestine; Lester Palestine
- Defunct: 1975; 51 years ago
- Fate: Bankruptcy
- Headquarters: New Bedford, Massachusetts, United States
- Area served: United States

Arlan's was an American discount store chain.

== Founding and growth ==
Arlan's was founded in 1945 by William, Herbert, and Lester Palestine in New Bedford, Massachusetts.

In 1963, executives tried to start talks with King's of Newton, Massachusetts, regarding a merger. These plans were briefly revived in 1966.

Arlan's opened its 50th store in Cudahy, Wisconsin, in 1965. At this point, the chain had $174 million in revenue, and stores in 18 states from Maine to Colorado. It also owned 18 locations of a toy store called Play World.

== Peak and decline ==
The chain peaked in size at 119 stores in 1970, by which time the company began experiencing heavy operating losses. The losses would later be attributed, in part, to an expansion strategy that was too geographically diverse for the chain's size, leading to inefficient distribution. In 1971, Arlan's explored the possibility of filing for bankruptcy, but it was concluded that such an action would be premature. That same year, Arlan's sold 16 stores to Target.

== Bankruptcy proceedings and "Mission Impossible" ==
In May 1973, two years after the resignation of co-founder Herbert Palestine, Arlan's filed for Chapter 11 bankruptcy. By that time, the chain had contracted to 73 stores. An ambitious plan to revive sales during the Christmas 1973 season, called "Mission Impossible" by company insiders and executed without disclosure to, or approval of, the court, failed to turn the chain's fortunes around and an additional 38 stores closed by January 1974. The Securities and Exchange Commission successfully petitioned the court to have the bankruptcy converted to Chapter 10. The chain continued to shrink dramatically under bankruptcy as losses mounted and Arlan's liquidated its final ten stores in early 1975 by order of the bankruptcy court. Subsequent court rulings would document various unethical practices by Arlan's legal representatives, regarding fees and a lack of candor.
