= Gray Drug =

Drugstore chain in Cleveland, Ohio, United States

- Industry: Pharmacy
- Founded: 1912
- Founder: Adolph Weinberger
- Defunct: 1987
- Fate: Sold to Rite Aid
- Headquarters: Cleveland, Ohio, United States
- Area served: Ohio
- Parent: Sherwin-Williams (1981-1987)

Gray Drug was an American drugstore chain in Cleveland, Ohio. It was founded under the Weinberger name in 1912 before changing to Gray Drug in 1945. For a time, the company also owned a chain of discount stores.

== History ==
=== Weinberger Drug Co. ===
In 1912, Hungarian immigrant Adolph Weinberger opened a drug store on E. 30th and Scovill Avenue in Cleveland, Ohio. He began acquiring other stores and incorporated Weinberger Drug Co. in 1921. By 1927, there were six stores. In 1929, Weinberger acquired Henry Gray's drug store. Gray stayed on as an assistant manager and worked his way up the organization.

Weinberger expanded to 21 stores throughout Cleveland, Mansfield, Sandusky, Youngstown, and Pittsburgh by 1934 and continued to grow throughout the Great Depression. In 1936, there were 29 stores with headquarters at 2400 Superior Avenue. In 1945, he acquired 12 Mykrantz stores in Columbus, Ohio, 26 Widman-Teah stores in New York and Pennsylvania, and 10 Rutledge stores in Akron.

=== Gray Drug Stores ===
On August 13, 1945, the name of the 78-store chain was changed to Gray Drug Stores, after Gray. He was subsequently promoted to vice president and general manager of the company and elected as a director. Two years later, 12 drug stores in Pennsylvania were returned to Widman and Teah. The company's expansion continued with the purchase of the King Drug Company in 1958.

The company entered the discount department store business by acquiring the Cincinnati-based Rink's Department Store chain in 1964. In 1966, Gray moved its headquarters to 666 Euclid Avenue. It also bought the 12-unit Bargain City chain in 1967. Gray's stock was listed on the New York Stock Exchange in January 1968.

By the end of the decade, Gray's business was on the decline. As president and chief executive, Weinberger's son, Jerome, modernized the company by opening larger stores and emphasizing a greater variety of goods and services. As a result, sales increased from $115 million in 1968 to $314 million in 1977.

The company entered Florida in May 1971 with the purchase of 27 Broward Drug stores and a Ft. Lauderdale warehouse. By January 1973, there were 31 stores in the state with the opening of its first West Coast shop in Venice, Florida. The company had 177 Gray Drug stores, 40 Rink's discount stores, and 47 leased pharmacies within other store by 1977.

Gray Drug nearly doubled its size in 1981 with the acquisition of the Virginia-based Drugfair chain. At the time, Gray operated 181 stores in Ohio and Florida. The deal added 175 stores in the District of Columbia, Maryland, Virginia, Pennsylvania, Delaware, and West Virginia. In a related transaction, Gray sold the 47-store Rink's chain to Cook United for $35 million.

=== Sale to Sherwin-Williams ===
Gray Drug Fair was then bought by Sherwin-Williams for $55 million that September after an unsuccessful takeover attempt by National City Lines. The chain had 362 stores at this time. Following three months of disappointing results, Gray's president was fired. Gray Drug acquired several Cunningham Drug stores in 1982.

By July 1986, Sherwin-Williams announced it would put Gray Drug Fair up for sale. There were 450 stores in Ohio, the District of Columbia, Delaware, Florida, Indiana, Maryland, New York, North Carolina, Pennsylvania, Virginia, and West Virginia at the time. In December 1986, Sherwin-Williams agreed to sell its 22 stores in Baltimore and 81 stores in Florida to Rite Aid. The rest of the chain would be sold to Gray Drug's management team. However, this deal ultimately fell through and Rite Aid acquired the entire 356-store chain in May 1987. The deal expanded the company into the D.C. market for the first time.
