= Goedeker's =

Polished.com Inc.
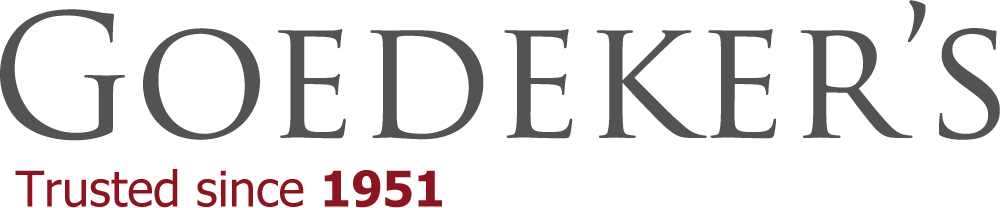
- Formerly: 1847 Goedeker Inc.
- Type: Public
- Traded as: Expert Market: POLCQ (2024-present); OTC Pink Current: POLCQ (2024); OTC Pink Current: POLC (2024); NYSE: POL (2022-2024); NYSE: GOED (2020-2022)
- Industry: Retailing
- Founded: July 1951; 75 years ago
- Defunct: March 7, 2024; 2 years ago
- Fate: Chapter 7 Bankruptcy And Liquidation
- Headquarters: Brooklyn, New York, USA
- Products: Appliances; Furniture
- Number of employees: 90
- Website: https://investor.polished.com/

Polished.com Inc., formerly Goedeker's, was a large independent business that sold appliances, furniture, and home goods in the U.S., with a showroom in St. Louis, Missouri. Since 2008, Goedeker’s had also sold their products through their website. In February 2024, it halted operations and filed for bankruptcy after efforts to refinance fell through.

== History ==
In June 1951, Ben Goedeker started Goedeker Radio and Television Repair in his home in south St. Louis. His success in the repair business led him to begin selling discount electronics and appliances in addition to providing repairs.

He opened his first showroom space in a 1,200 sq. ft. building. After years of growth, he expanded into a 3,500 sq. ft. building in 1970. Steve Goedeker, Ben's eldest son, worked for him after school and during the summer.

In 1973, Steve graduated from college and started working at his father’s business full-time. In 1977, Ben died from cancer and Steve took over the business.

Steve’s leadership prompted even further growth, which necessitated expansion into a 22,000 sq. ft. building in 1989. A year later, his siblings Mike Goedeker and Janet Minor joined the business, with Mike managing the sales department and Janet managing accounting.

In 1998, Goedeker’s opened an additional showroom location in a 50,000 sq. ft. building. They also added furniture and mattresses to their product line.

Business began to decline in 2001, and they were forced to close their 22,000 sq. ft. showroom location.

After nearing bankruptcy in 2008, the company launched its eCommerce website Number1Direct.com in 2009, which was successful and grew over the next few years.

In 2012, they converted 45,000 of their 50,000 sq. ft. building into warehouse and office space, leaving 5,000 sq. ft. for the St. Louis showroom. In an effort to unify their branding with their store location, they transitioned to the domain goedekers.com.

As technology use changed, Goedeker’s created a mobile-friendly version of their website which launched in the summer of 2014.

In June 2019, Goedeker's entered into a new partnership with 1847 Holdings, LLC with a focus on growth and expansion. A new CEO, Doug Moore, was named to take the lead.

== Goedeker’s today ==
In October 2020, Goedeker's announced the acquisition of Appliances Connection, a deal that closed in June 2021 and created one of the largest pure-play online retailers of household appliances in the U.S. In August 2022, Rick Bunka, CEO of Appliances Connection, succeeded Moore as CEO of the combined companies, including Florida-based Appliance Gallery, acquired a month earlier. In July 2022, the company announced it would operate under the new parent name of Polished and have a new ticker (NYSE American: POL).

In February 2024, Polished suspended its operations and announced an intention to declare Chapter 7 bankruptcy liquidation. The company stated that it could not obtain additional financing despite attempting to raise capital and improve liquidity. Polished immediately ceased operations after the announcement. Polished.com filed for Chapter 7 bankruptcy on March 7, 2024.

== Criticism ==
Goedeker's received a large amount of complaints due to its poor customer service and its deceptive business practices, which has led to the Better Business Bureau advising consumers to use caution when considering doing business with Goedeker’s.
