= Heer's =

Heer's Department Store
- Industry: Department store
- Founded: 1869
- Defunct: 1995
- Fate: Defunct
- Headquarters: 138 Park Central Square, Springfield, Missouri, United States
- Key people: Charles Heer

Heer's Department Store, with its original location at 138 Park Central West (formerly College Street) in Springfield, Missouri, was one of southwest Missouri's largest and most prominent department stores for 80 years. Heer's Department Store was listed on the National Register of Historic Places in 2002.

== History ==
=== 1869-1995 ===
Heer's was founded in 1869 by German immigrant Charles H. Heer (1820-1898) and incorporated as Charles H. Heer Dry Goods Company in 1882. Charles H. Heer passed management of the store to his youngest son, Francis Xavier Heer (1862-1949), in 1886. Francis X. Heer became store president upon his father's death and remained in that position until his death.

After a fire destroyed the store in 1913, a new building was built at the 138 Park Central Square location. The new seven story terracotta sheathed steel commercial building opened in September 1915 with 21,000 people streaming through the store that day.

In 1940, Heer's was purchased by Allied Stores of New York and received major renovations such as air conditioning and escalators. More renovations were done in 1969 to make it look more like major department stores in other big cities and a new Heer's store was opened in Battlefield Mall in 1976. In 1988, Heer's bought out Newman's department store at the Northpark Mall in Joplin, Missouri under the direction of President and CEO Janet Boswell. The company filed for bankruptcy in the 1990s. 1994 saw the closing of the Joplin location and in 1995 Heer's was no longer in operation.

== Redevelopment and Plans for the Future ==
The Heer's Department Store, which was often described as the largest department store in all of southwest Missouri, was the most prominent retail operation ever to operate on the Public Square in Springfield. The removal of sheathing which was added to the oldest part of the building in the 1960s has largely returned the building to its early appearance, and it once again looks much as it did during the period of significance. Most of the early terracotta sheathing remains in place, as does the original cornice and most of the original windows. The building is undergoing a large restoration and renovation project converting the former department store into loft apartments.

Since closing, the building changed hands many times, each purchase bringing an announcement of restoration and new life to one of the city's most visible landmarks. In 2001, then-owner Warren Davis began restoring the building's exterior, planning restaurants, shops and office space. By 2006, it landed in the city's lap after another developer, Jefferson City-based Vaughn Prost, relinquished control.

St. Louis developer Kevin McGowan, president and CEO of Blue Urban LLC, bought the building from the city for $3 million (~$4.36 million in 2024) in November 2007 with plans to build upscale condominiums above a restaurant. The recession stalled funding on the project and left McGowan scrambling to come up with a new plan. The developer announced in 2009 that he was applying for a loan from the U.S. Housing and Urban Development, but never followed through with his application. In 2011, the city boarded up the building and placed a lien against the property. In March of that year, the amount owed was approximately $100,000.

In 2012, the building's mortgage was purchased from Heartland Bank by E and J HIDC, and in May, 2013, Heer's Luxury Living, LLC, led by the Jim Nichols, CEO of the Lee's Summit-based Dalmark Group, and Ernie Straub of Straub Construction, asked the city to discuss possible incentives as it worked on another redevelopment plan.

A groundbreaking ceremony was held in July, 2014. Jim Nichols, owner of the Dalmark Group, said, "I'm proud to say we've got our financing, we've got our plan and everything is being implemented." The current construction project includes 80 luxury apartments with amenities such as a fitness center, theater, and rooftop terrace and clubhouse, as well as commercial space. Construction has since been completed.
