= Cook's (department store) =

Regional department store in the United States (1961-1987)

Cook's Discount Department Stores
- Founded: 1961
- Defunct: 1987
- Fate: Bankruptcy and liquidation
- Headquarters: Cleveland, Ohio
- Number of locations: 115 (1981)
- Parent: Cook United
- Subsidiaries: Rink's; Uncle Bill's; Ontario; Whitehall's

Cook's was a chain of discount department stores in the United States, from 1961 to 1987. Headquartered in Cleveland, Ohio, the chain grew to a peak of 115 stores before filing for Chapter 11 Bankruptcy first in 1984, then in 1987, before filing for Chapter 7 bankruptcy later that year.

== History ==
Cook's began in 1961, with the purchase of 5 Uncle Bill's Discount Department Stores and three other small discount department store chains in the Midwest and East. The 47-store Rink's Discount Department Stores chain was purchased from Gray Drug in 1981, at which point the chain reached its peak of 115 stores. In 1984, the chain closed a total of 41 stores in the Spring of 1984, shortly before declaring Chapter 11 bankruptcy. 12 further stores were closed during bankruptcy, reducing the chain to 32 stores before exiting bankruptcy in late 1986. The chain filed Chapter 11 bankruptcy again in 1987, planning to close 26 of 29 stores and operate 3 stores, two in Lima, Ohio and one in Wauseon, Ohio. It was announced in November 1987 that the final three stores were to liquidate, closing before the end of the year.
