= White Front =

American chain of discount stores (1929–1974)

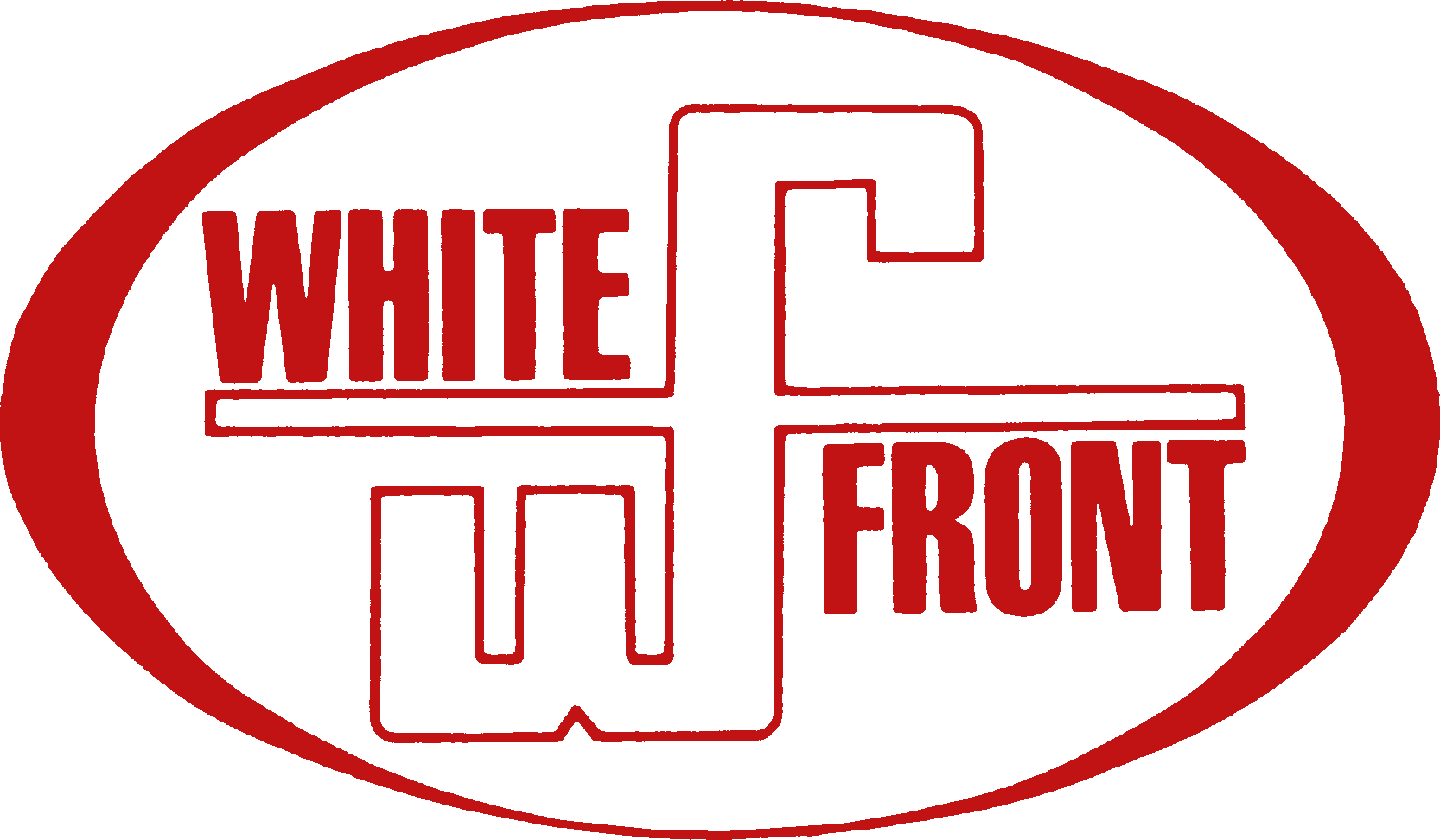
- Type: Subsidiary
- Industry: Discount store, Retail
- Founded: 1929; 97 years ago in Los Angeles
- Defunct: 1974; 52 years ago
- Fate: Bankruptcy of parent company
- Headquarters: Los Angeles, California
- Area served: California, Oregon, Washington
- Products: clothing, footwear, housewares, sporting goods, hardware, toys, electronics, groceries
- Parent: Interstate Department Stores

White Front was a chain of discount department stores in California and the western United States from 1929 through the mid-1970s. The stores had a distinctive front architecture with an enormous, sweeping archway having the store name spelled out in letters fanned across the top. For several years, White Front was the leading discount store in the U.S.

== History ==
In 1929, the company was founded and opened its first store at 7651 S. Central Avenue in Florence, South Los Angeles. In 1950 it expanded this store. In a 1950 advertisement, the company tongue-in-cheek explained that its lone location was in a "low rent area".

=== Origins and initial growth ===
White Front traced its origin to the opening of a small Los Angeles self-service grocery store on Central Avenue near 77th Street by a 23-year redhead named Harry Blackman just a few weeks before the stock market crash of 1929. Blackman had worked in the food store business for several years by working through various positions up to store manager before he decided he wanted to start his own business. He opened the White Front Market, named after the color of the store front, on Central with $200 cash and $10,000 credit with wholesalers. He tried to carry items that his customers wanted and tried to help them by allowing his customers to pay for their groceries on credit until they received their relief checks. A 1934 article in the Los Angeles Evening Post-Record showed that Blackman's grocery store, White Front Market, was located at 7710 South Central Avenue and a 1940 ad in the Los Angeles Times showed the market was still at the same address six years later.

At first, the small store did not sell non-food items such as small tube radios. His initial foray happened purely by accident. A radio salesman that he knew came into the store one day and asked Blackman if he could help him sell some small portable radios in his store that were priced at $9.95 by having Blackman display them near the cash register. The radios were not selling at all at the list price until a woman offered to purchase one on credit with $0.50 down and then $0.50 per week until the radio was paid off. Blackman was able to sell the rest of the radios to other customers under the same terms. Later, another customer offered to purchase the same radio for $8 in cash. Under the new cash terms, Blackman found out that he could that he could sell even more radios at a quicker rate while still making a small profit. He later branched out and start selling other small household appliances in his grocery store, such as toasters and steam irons. This side business continued until the attack on Pearl Harbor in 1941 when consumer goods production was halted as US factories switched over to produce war-related goods for the armed forces. Blackman himself was drafted into the army in 1943, and his wife Lillian operated the grocery until his return after the war.

After Blackman returned from the Army, he opened a major appliance store across the street from the grocery at 7657 S. Central Avenue called White Front Household Appliance. His new store sold large appliances such as refrigerators, washers, and televisions in addition to small appliances such as mixers, toasters, and radios. Gradually, his store expanded down the block to occupy most of the neighboring store fronts on Central. When the store expanded to the end of the block, it shortened its name to White Front Appliance and the address was changed to 7651 S. Central Avenue. By 1954, the company had changed its name to White Front Stores and began to carry other items such as furniture, jewelry, carpeting, luggage, cameras, and silverware.

White Front opened its second store in October 1957 at 16040 Sherman Way in Van Nuys. The new store, at 50,000-square-foot, was larger than the original store on Central. Celebrities attending the grand opening included Bozo the Clown and Engineer Bill. At this time, the leaders of this company were Harry Blackman as president, Sam Nassi as vice-president, and Harry's wife Lillian as secretary-treasurer. Ironically, Nassi would return years later to help White Front's liquidate its store inventory in 1973.

In April 1959, the two store chain was acquired by Interstate Department Stores, Inc., for $1,650,000 (~$13.9 million in 2025) in cash and shares. Interstate expanded the chain to other California locations and broadened its retail mix beyond the original housewares. Around this same time, Interstate had also acquired another discount department store chain in the eastern part of the country called Topps Discount Stores, but Interstate always had kept the two chains separate.

=== Rapid growth in California under Interstate ===
After receiving cash from its parent Interstate, White Front was able to expand throughout the Los Angeles metropolitan area and into the rest of California. The company was known for its opening ceremonies which included governmental officials and Hollywood celebrities.

In November 1960, White Front opened the third store in their chain at Harbor and Wilken Way in Anaheim. Celebrities at the grand opening included the California attorney general Stanley Mosk and actress Marilyn Maxwell.

The fourth White Front store was opened on Olympic Blvd. in East Los Angeles in October 1961 by converting an existing building that had been used as its general offices and a warehouse.

In March 1962, the company opened its fifth store on Azuza Avenue in Covina. Grand opening celebrities attending were actors Keenan Wynn, Mark Stevens, Gail Davis and Greta Thyssen.

The sixth White Front store was opened on Orange Show Road in San Bernardino in October 1962. Celebrities included were actors Johnny Weissmuller, Greta Thyssen, Alan Mowbray, and Gail Davis.

In November 1962, the seventh store was opened at Jefferson and Hauser Blvds. in West Los Angeles. Celebrities attending were actors Greta Thyssen, Alan Mowbray, Keenan Wynn and Gail Davis.

The eighth White Front store was opened on Torrance Blvd. in Torrance in March 1963. Celebrities included were actor Ricardo Montalbán, comedian Soupy Sales, actress Gail Davis, actress Mala Powers, and actor Johnny Weissmuller.

In May 1963, the ninth store was opened on Roscoe Blvd. in Canoga Park. Celebrities included were comedian Pinky Lee, comedian Bill Dana, actress Gail Davis, rock duo Jan and Dean, and jazz musician Big Tiny Little.

The tenth White Front store was opened on Hegenberger Road in Oakland in early October 1963. This was the first store to open in Northern California. Dignitaries included were California state officials such as Governor Edmund G. Brown Sr., Lieutenant Governor Glenn M. Anderson, and Attorney General Stanley Mosk. Celebrities attending were actors Jayne Mansfield, George Jessel, Marvin Miller, Troy Donahue, and Gail Davis.

In late October 1963, the chain open its 11th store on Laurel Canyon Blvd. in Pacoima. Celebrities included actors Troy Donahue, Rick Jason and Gail Davis.

The 12th White Front store was opened on Moorpark in San Jose in November 1963. This was the second store to open in Northern California.

In May 1964, the 13th store was opened on El Camino Real in Sunnyvale. This was the third store to open in Northern California.

The 14th White Front store was opened on Arden Way in Sacramento in August 1964. This was the fourth store to open in Northern California. Celebrities included were actors Jayne Mansfield, Mickey Hargitay, Gail Davis, and Marvin Miller.

In early November 1964, the 15th store was opened on Contra Costa Blvd. in Pleasant Hill. This was the fifth store to open in Northern California. Celebrities included were actors Mamie Van Doren, Marvin Miller, Rick Jason, and Gail Davis.

The 16th White Front store was opened on Mountain Avenue in Ontario in late November 1964. Celebrities included were actors Gail Davis.

In May 1965, the 17th store was opened on Blackstone Avenue in Fresno. This was the sixth store to open in Northern California. Celebrities included were actors Gail Davis, Marvin Miller and Rick Jason.

The original Central Avenue store was "burned to the ground" during the August 1965 Watts riots. This caused the store count to drop back to 16.

The 17th White Front store was opened at Florin Road and Stockton Boulevard in South Sacramento in September 1965. This was the seventh store to open in Northern California and the second in Sacramento. Celebrities attending were actors Marvin Miller and the rock group The Turtles.

In November 1965, the 18th store was opened on El Camino Real in South San Francisco. This was the eighth store to open in Northern California. Celebrities included were actors Carol Channing, Jayne Mansfield, Marvin Miller, Rick Jason, and Gail Davis plus the musical group Liverpool Five.

A pair of stores, the 19th and 20th stores in the chain, were opened in San Diego county in late November in La Mesa and in San Diego. Celebrities included were actors Jayne Mansfield, Rick Jason, Marvin Miller, and Gail Davis plus the Jerry Gray Orchestra.

In September 1966, the 21st store was opened on Bristol Street in Costa Mesa. Celebrities included were actors Jayne Mansfield, Quinn O'Hara, Joanie Sommers, Mark Miller, Chris Robinson, Marvin Miller and Rick Jason.

The 22nd White Front store was opened on Woodruff in Downey in November 1966. Celebrities included were actors Joanie Sommers, Lori Saunders and Marvin Miller.

In March 1967, the 23rd store was opened on Central Avenue in Los Angeles on the site of the original Central Avenue store that was razed to the ground 19 months prior by angry rioters. Celebrities included were comedian Bill Cosby and actors Carole Cole, and Rick Jason.

The first two stores to be built outside of California were opened in Washington state in October and November 1967.

In April 1968, White Front announced that they were closing their Van Nuys store and liquidating its stock. At that time, the Van Nuys store was the oldest one and the only one that predated the acquisition of the company by Interstate. The result of this closing reduced the official store count by one.

The 27th White Front store in the nation, the 24th in California and the ninth in Northern California, was opened on Sixteenth Street, on the site of the former Seals Stadium, in San Francisco in October 1968. Celebrities attending were singing star John Gary; comedian Pat Paulsen; and actors Rose Marie and Lainie Kazan.

The last mention of the rebuilt Central Avenue store was in a December 1968 White Front ad. This ad also mentioned the 11 other Los Angeles-area stores. Of the 12 stores total, 8 were in Los Angeles County, 2 in Orange County, and 2 in San Bernardino County. There are no verifiable records when the Central Avenue store closed.

In March 1969, the 26th White Front store was opened on Mowry Avenue in Newark. This was the tenth store in Northern California. Celebrities included were singer Bill Medley of The Righteous Brothers; comedian Charles Nelson Reilly; plus actors Richard X. Slattery, Barbara Stuart, Dick Gautier, Warren Berlinger, Elizabeth Allen, Ann B. Davis, Bill Mumy, Susan Saint James, and Jay Silverheels.

The 27th store in the chain was opened in the Puget Sound area of Washington state.

In December 1969, the 28th White Front store in the nation and the 25th store in California was opened on Ventu Park Road in Thousand Oaks. Celebrities included were actors Lainie Kazan and Darby Hinton.

The 29th White Front store in the nation and the 26th one in California was opened on the Imperial Highway at Normandie in the southwest portion of Los Angeles County in March 1970. This store is one of the first of the "new look" stores without the distinctive arch entryway. Celebrities attending were NBA player and coach Bill Russell, Los Angeles Rams defense back Ron Smith, actor Don Mitchell, singer Abbe Lane, and singer Della Reese.

In April 1970, the 30th White Front store and the 27th store in California was opened at Pierce and Central Avenues in Richmond El Cerrito. This was the 11th store in Northern California.

In May 1970, the 31st White Front store in the nation and the 28th store in California was opened on National Avenue in Chula Vista. This was the third store in San Diego County. Celebrities at the grand opening included NFL quarterback John Hadl; NBA player John Block; talk show host Regis Philbin; and actors Dennis Cole, Burt Ward, and Lee Meriwether. Pantry Pride operated the discount food supermarket in the Chula Vista store and also at the other two White Front stores in San Diego County.

It was expected that the 32nd White Front store in the nation was going to open in San Carlos around August 1970. However, no newspaper articles can be located to verify whether the grand opening of this store actually occurred.

Although there are newspaper articles reporting the April 1970 land purchase for the site of the future 120,000-square-foot White Front store on California Avenue in the Bakersfield Plaza shopping center in Bakersfield, no verifiable articles can be located to verify whether the grand opening of this store actually occurred. It is inferred that the Bakersfield store opened sometime after the San Carlos store in mid-1970 and before the opening of the Riverside store in May 1971. The Bakersfield store was the second White Front store in Central California after the opening of the store in Fresno.

The first and only store in Oregon was opened in September 1970.

In May 1971, the 36th White Front store in the nation was opened on Magnolia in Riverside.

The 37th White Front store in the nation was opened on Cherry Avenue in Long Beach in September 1971.

At the company's height in mid-1972, the company had 37 White Front stores located in three states.

A June 1972 White Front ad in the San Bernardino Sun displayed the addresses of 15 stores in Southern California with 9 stores in Los Angeles County, 2 in San Bernardino County, 2 Stores in Orange County, 1 in Riverside County, and 1 in Ventura County. Missing from this list is the Central Avenue store, and the closed Van Nuys store. Also listed are three TV & Appliance Marts that were located in Temple City, Glendale, and Whittier.

An October 1972 White Front ad in the San Bernardino Sun displayed the addresses of 16 stores in Southern California with 7 stores in Los Angeles County, 3 stores in San Diego County, 2 in San Bernardino County, 2 Stores in Orange County, 1 in Riverside County, and 1 in Ventura County. Missing from this store list is the Central Avenue store, the closed Van Nuys store, the Torrance store, and the year-old Long Beach Store.

=== Entering the Puget Sound market ===
White Front entered the Seattle/Tacoma market on October 19, 1967, with the North Seattle location in a 155,000-square-foot building and a parking lot with a capacity for 1,000 vehicles. The grand opening was hosted by the stars of Petticoat Junction, Howard Duff, and Sharon Vaughn, the former Miss Washington of 1958, who was known as Miss White Front for the opening. It was televised live for three hours on KING-TV. Four additional stores were built in high-traffic areas in Burien, Tacoma, Bellevue, and Everett.

Two weeks after the opening of the North Seattle location, the second White Front store in Washington state was open in Tacoma on November 1, 1967.

No newspaper articles can be located that mention the opening of the Burien store in November 1969, the fourth store in Washington state opened on 148th Avenue in Bellevue.

The fifth and last store in Washington state was opened at the Everett Mall in Everett in May 1971.

All but the Everett location were closed by January 19, 1973. The last ad for White Front appeared in The Seattle Times on December 9, 1972. The Everett and Portland stores remained open (the only two locations to remain open outside of California) while the remaining stores' merchandise was liquidated until February 1973. According to a December 14 article in The Seattle Times, the company stated that "the five stores hadn't begun to turn a profit". While the company was quiet about the closures, local factors including the "Boeing Bust", could have played a role in the downturn of the chain in the area. Archives about the company don’t indicate a local distribution center in the Northwest.

In an article published by The Seattle Times (on June 16, 1972) General Manager Walter Craig, explained that the stores had yet to make a profit in the Northwest but wanted to retool the stores for the customer base by adding more lights, widening aisles for better traffic flow, repainting the exterior of the building, and restriping the parking lots spending $250,000. The company implemented a "Friedlee" program complete with an elf like mascot to improve customer service.

Three of the four closed stores were acquired by Weisfields to become Valu-Mart/Leslie's stores by the end of 1973. The grocery sections were leased to Associated Grocers. The Tacoma store had seen many ownership changes: first as a Valu-Mart/Leslie's store (acquired in February 1973), later a Jafco and then a Best store (currently Michael's). The Burien store became the flagship store for Valu-Mart/Leslie's (currently Fred Meyer). It was acquired from White Front in February 1973. The Burien location is one of the larger stores in the Fred Meyer chain. The North Seattle store became a Kmart (closed in January 2013). The Everett store (appears to have remained opened until the company's complete liquidation in 1974 according to Everett Mall leasing records) was integrated into Everett Mall in 1977 to become a Bon Marché and then Macy's (Macy's recently closed the store). The Bellevue store was acquired by Valu-Mart/Leslie's in November 1973 and became a Fred Meyer as well. The towering store signs used for the locations remain visible at the North Seattle and Tacoma sites.

Stores built before 1970 contained a "Discount Foods" grocery store department. Safeway Inc. took ownership of the grocery section in some markets, and newer-design stores, such as those in Everett and Bellevue that were built without the arch, also did not have a grocery store.

=== Entering the Portland market ===
In 1970, the company made an attempt to expand into Oregon market at the Mall 205 in Portland, Oregon. The store had its grand opening on September 19, 1970. The grand opening ceremony featured game show host Allen Ludden of Password, actress Ann B. Davis of The Brady Bunch, recording artist John Gary, and then little known singer Neil Diamond performing with the Seattle-based rock band Springfield Rifle (most store openings were promoted by Hollywood stars). Plans were made to construct additional stores in Beaverton and Oak Grove but they never materialized. The Portland store failed largely due to competition from other retailers.

=== Downfall and bankruptcy ===
White Front closed their Thousand Oaks store in early November 1972. Within two weeks, the company also quietly closed its Riverside store that was barely open for 18 months and moved the entire inventory to a nearby store in San Bernardino.

On December 13, 1972, Interstate chairman Sol Canter announced the closing of 21 of the 37 White Front stores, all of which were in Northern California, Oregon, and Washington, to eliminate $10–11 million in loses in an ill-fated attempt to preserve the remaining stores in Southern California.

After a further 17 month struggle to rescue the floundering chain, the remaining 15 White Front discount stores and its six White Front appliance centers were finally closed after Interstate filed for Chapter 11 bankruptcy reorganization in May 1974.

In their struggle to reverse their loses, the chain opened smaller "TV & Appliance Marts" that carried less variety and smaller inventory. Not much is known about these short lived stores except that they first appeared in ads in 1972 and there was a maximum of six in 1974, all located within Los Angeles County.

=== Aftermath ===
Many of the former White Front sites were quickly occupied by other retailers while other sites remained vacant for years before they were bulldozed and replaced by newer structures. The search for potential replacement tenants in some communities was hindered by the glut of vacant big store sites created by the Recession of 1969–1970. Other large retailers that closed stores in this period included G.E.M.

J.C. Penney obtained four vacant former White Front sites (in Concord, Fremont, South San Francisco, and Sunnyvale) plus two vacant former G. E. M. Membership Department Stores in the San Francisco Bay Area in early 1974 to introduce their The Treasury discount chain to the West Coast.

In San Diego County, FedMart purchased the lease on one of the stores while Two Guys purchased the leases for the other two stores in November 1974. In Los Angeles County, Two Guys also acquired the site of the former Pacoima store around the same time of acquiring the two sites in San Diego.

The two vacant store sites in Sacramento were refurbished and reopened as Gold Circle stores in Spring 1976.

The White Front store on California Avenue in Bakersfield, California, was closed in 1973 and remained vacant for three years before Mervyn's purchased and remodeled the empty building prior to the opening of its 36th store in Bakersfield in March 1977. Mervyn's also opened a new store 2 weeks later in another vacant San Joaquin Valley White Front store site in Fresno.

A number of independent local pharmacies continue to carry the White Front name in Costa Mesa and elsewhere, having inherited it from their former host stores, but are otherwise unrelated.

== See also ==
- List of defunct department stores of the United States
