= Forest Building =

Postmodern retail showroom in Richmond, Virginia

Coordinates: 37°36′24″N 77°34′18″W

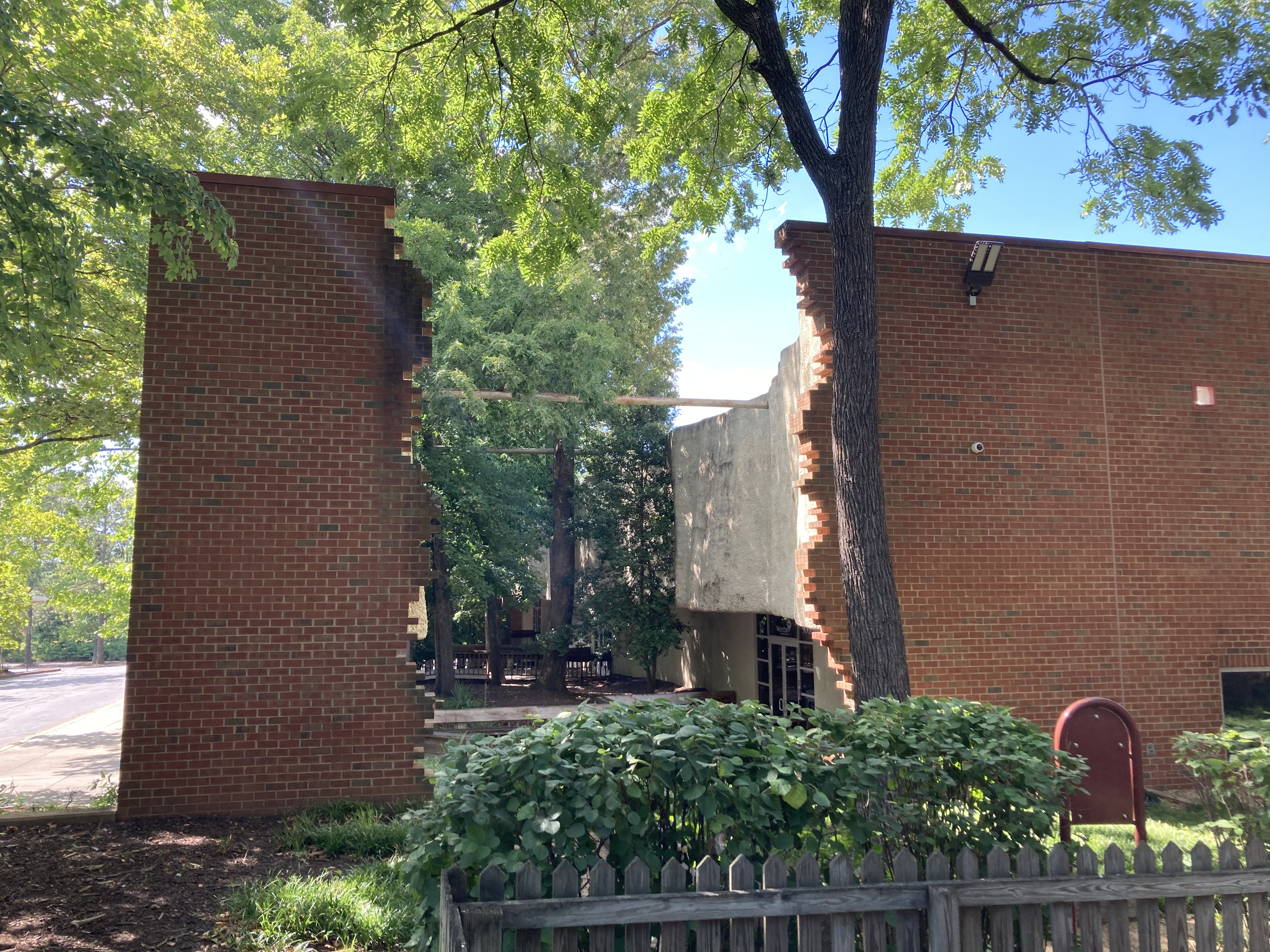
- West End Presbyterian Church photographed in 2024

- Location within Virginia
- Alternative names: Forest Showroom; West End Presbyterian Church

General information
- Architectural style: Postmodern
- Location: 9008 Quioccasin Road, Henrico County, Virginia, United States
- Construction started: 1978
- Completed: 1980
- Renovated: 2000

Design and construction
- Architect: James Wines
- Architecture firm: SITE
- Known for: Last extant Best Products showroom

Website
- www.wepc.org

The Forest Building or Forest Showroom is a former retail building in Henrico, Virginia, United States, that is an example of late 20th century postmodern architecture. Built in 1978–80 as an outlet for catalog merchant company Best Products, it was one of several prominent postmodern stores designed for Best by James Wines and his firm SITE. Each of the SITE-designed showrooms featured a visual twist on late 20th-century big box store design―often playing on themes of ruin or disaster―and the Forest Building expressed these themes with a false façade in front of its actual entrance that enclosed a screen of preexisting trees, giving the store the appearance of a ruin that had returned to nature.

While the SITE-designed Best showrooms received a critical reception when they were built, later commentators have praised them as architectural and artistic achievements. The Forest Building in particular was praised for its engagement with its natural setting. After Best Products liquidated in the 1990s, most of its stores were demolished or substantially altered. As of 2024, the Forest Building is the last surviving Best Products store to retain its original exterior design. Since 2000, it has been owned by West End Presbyterian Church.

== History ==
In the early 1970s, Best Products founders Sydney and Frances Lewis contracted with Wines' firm Sculpture in the Environment (SITE) to design nine unique showrooms for the company. The Forest Building was designed around preexisting trees on the site in the Richmond, Virginia area in 1978 and completed in 1980. Prior to construction, according to architect David Douglass-Jaimes, tree specialists spent months retraining the roots of trees to avoid the footings and foundation of the planned building.

The building operated as a Best Products showroom until the company's liquidation in 1997. In 1999, the building was purchased by West End Presbyterian Church, a Presbyterian Church in America church plant, which moved into the space in 2000 following interior renovations that preserved Wines' forest exterior concept. As of 2018, the church hosted architecture students and other visitors interested in viewing the last extant Best Products showroom.

== Architecture ==
As with the eight other SITE-designed Best Products showrooms, the design was a standard big-box store with an unusual visual twist that literally deconstructed the architectural form. At the Forest Building, SITE proposed building the entrance of the warehouse around existing trees on the site. According to curatorial text prepared for a Museum of Modern Art (MoMA) display of Forest Building designs, the building "reimagined the big-box store, manipulating setting, site, and façade through radical 'invasions of nature,' challenging visitors to strip malls with unexpected architecture. Here, an ordinarily untamed element of nature transforms a banal architectural type through a tongue-in-cheek intervention, creating a new environment in the expanses of a suburban parking lot."

What would otherwise appear to be a typical big-box store brick exterior was designed as a screen in front of trees and ground cover that would separate the façade from the rest of the store. Shoppers entered the store by walking through the 35 foot wide gap full of trees and grasses across bridges, that induced a sense of surrender to nature in shoppers. The separation of the façade from the building is marked by irregular brickwork signifying ruin. and which was intended to evoke a building reclaimed by nature. The sensation is enhanced by the use of rounded gunite lining the inside of the gap, creating a contrast with the smooth brick exterior and amplifying the sense of what SITE described as "unbuilding," according to Architectural Record.

== Reception ==
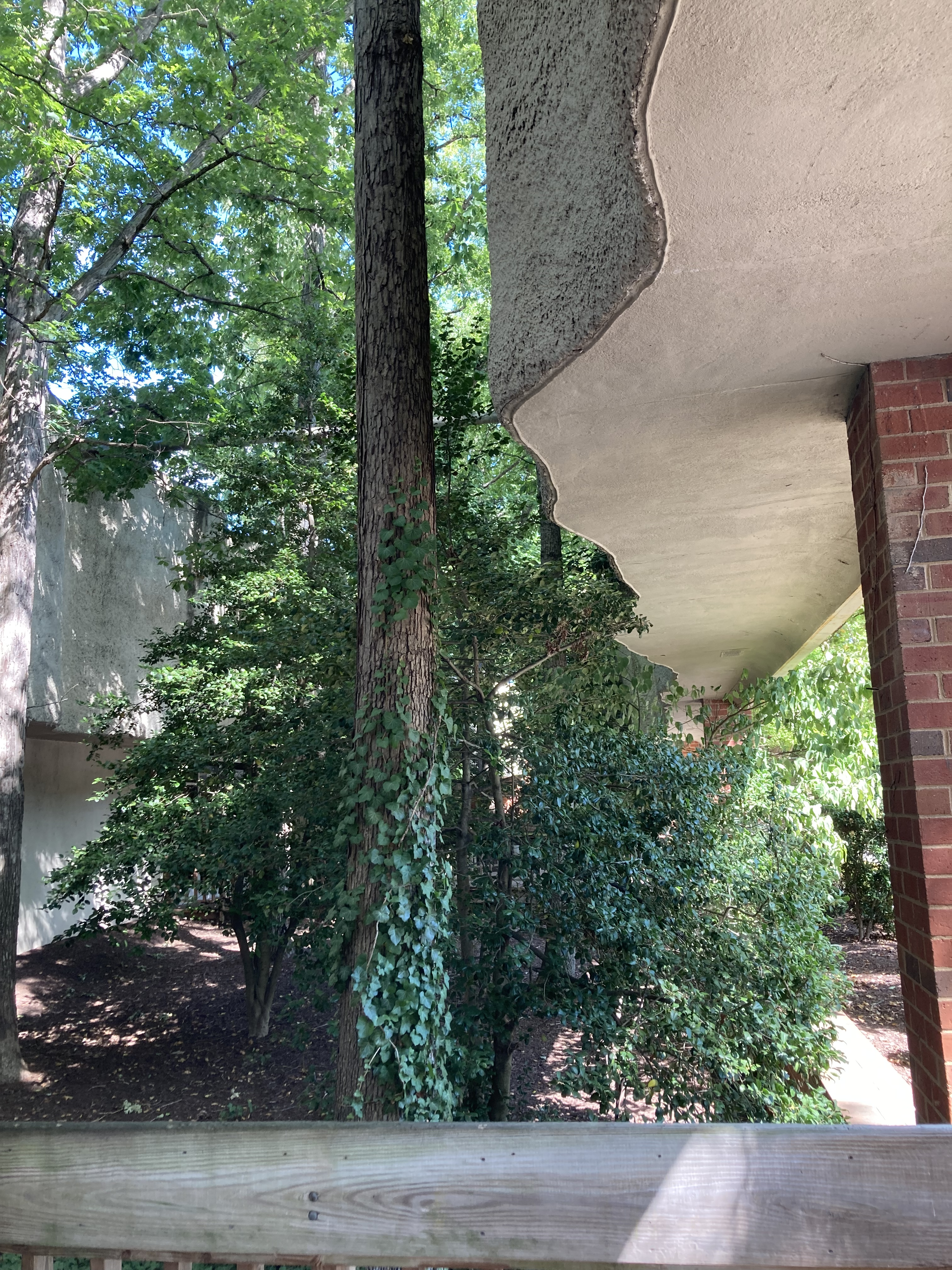
The gunite walls on the inside of the gap.

Contemporary critics took note of the humor in SITE's work. According to Douglass-Jaimes, when the "tongue in cheek" Best Products showrooms were built, they were

often met with staunchly negative criticism―especially following the completion of Indeterminate Façade in Houston―by the mainstream architectural press who saw no place for humor in architecture, but the Lewises continued to support the work in spite of the critical response.

However, Douglass-Jaimes noted that artists and art critics considered Wines' "exploration of decay, neglect, and artificiality [to] critique the throwaway nature of American consumer culture, the source of his clients’ business success." Meanwhile, Virginia architectural historian Richard Guy Wilson said that the glass wall of the showroom visible through the trees undermined any profundity in the Forest Building concept and made the building more of a joke.

In later years, however, the Forest Building, along with the other SITE-designed Best Products showrooms, has received substantial acclaim from art and architecture critics and curators. Wines' sketch and original model for the Forest Building were included in MoMA's 2009–2010 exhibit "In Situ: Architecture and Landscape," and the original sketch was featured in MoMA's 2012–2013 exhibit "9 + 1 Ways of Being Political: 50 Years of Political Stances in Architecture and Urban Design." Later critics noted that by placing art in unexpected places like suburban strip malls, Wines triggered curiosity in observers about their daily environments and described the described the Best Products showrooms as statement pieces that offered an ironic perspective without contempt for observers or clients. The Forest Building―which was designed relatively late in SITE's engagement with Best Products―was considered by a Washington Post critic to represent a more serious tone than the earlier Pop Art and surrealism-inspired SITE showrooms. Edwin Heathcote refers to the Forest Building in particular as "a fantastic tribute to an explosive architectural moment."

=== Return to nature concept ===
Critics and observers have noted the building's ruin-like appearance. While other SITE-designed showrooms played on themes of sudden peril, the Forest Building developed a theme of nature consuming human structures. The ultimate fate of most of the showrooms—demolition—illuminated the transient nature of big box suburban development, even as the buildings were designed to poke fun at this big box store typologies. Writer Margaret McCormack pointed out that Forest Building survived only by being transformed into a church, which she said affirms the ephemerality of big box architecture.

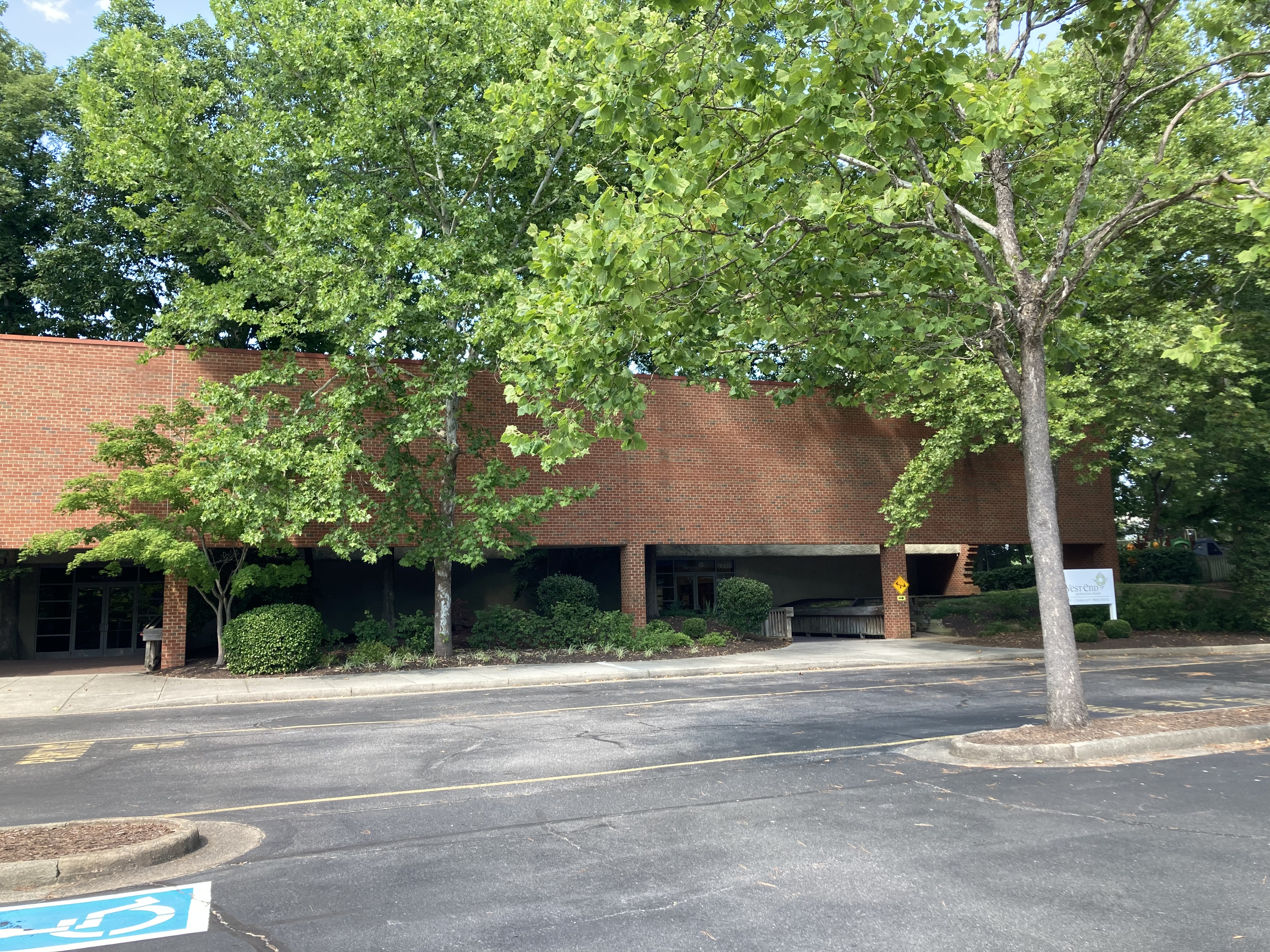
The former showroom, now church, pictured from its parking lot in 2024.

University of Glasgow art historian Dominic Paterson also observed that the Forest Building, like the other SITE buildings, evoked the passage of time and "often played with the appearance of ruin, with their façades variously fabricated as fractured, crumbling, or peeling," with the added irony that

[i]n the years since they were constructed, these unique buildings have themselves been subject to ruination, first through the closing of the Best Products chain, then through the subsequent dismantling of their decorative façades, and finally—in most cases—their complete demolition.

As the first building in which SITE fully realized the theme of ruin, according to architectural historian Jessica Robey, it became the progenitor for other SITE projects involving artificial ruins, excavations and deliberately unfinished projects. Wines himself has said the Forest Building was conceived as an expression of "nature's revenge."

=== Wines' reaction to renovations ===
Wines was later critical of the renovation carried out by the church. After initially being pleased at the prospect of its preservation, he later called the renovation "one of such blatant destruction that I kept hoping the structure would be mercifully removed in its entirety." Although he admitted the possibility of good intentions on the part of the new owner, he said the building was "virtually destroyed" by "a local architect who surgically removed every element that looked suspiciously like art," he said. Wines also criticized the removal of certain trees and ground cover, the addition of concrete accessibility paths added to the forested area and the elimination of terrarium gardens in the façade.
