= Highway 86 Art =

The Highway 86 art installation was a 217-metre long absurdist highway created for Expo 86 by James Wines and SITE.

Highway 86 did not survive beyond the life of the fair. James Wines had tried to raise $1 million to have the road's 200 vehicles cast in solid metal in order to preserve them, but by November 1986, the Disposal Division of Expo 86 sold the vehicles for a total of $70,000.

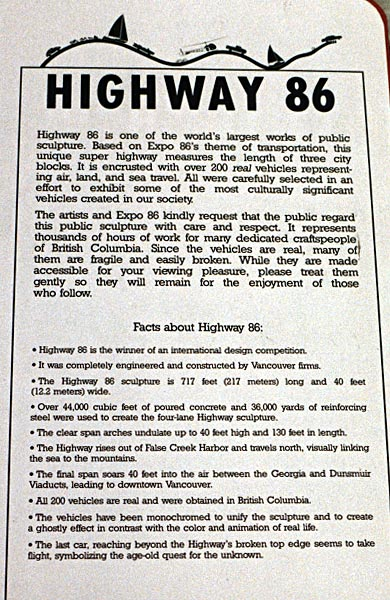

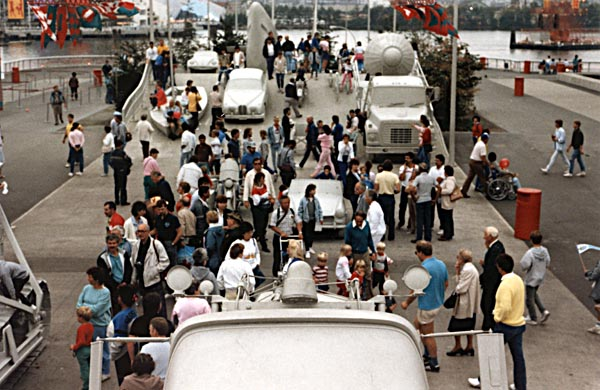

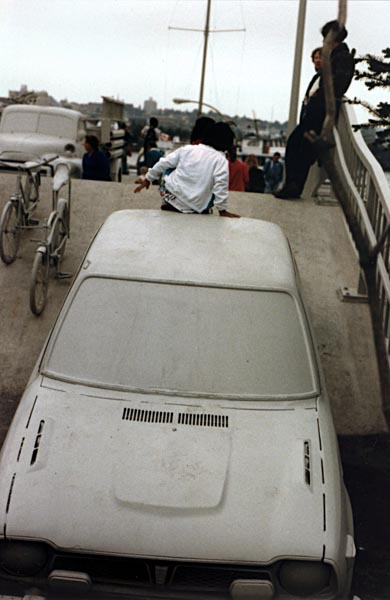

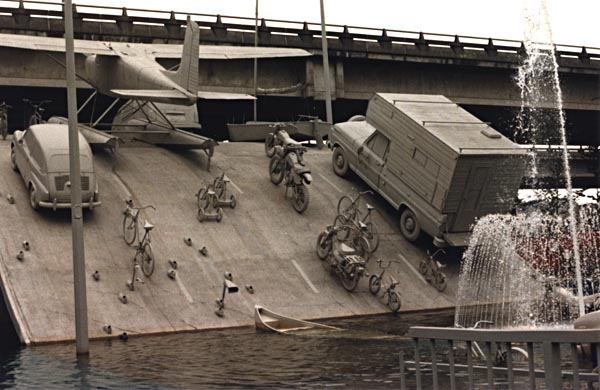

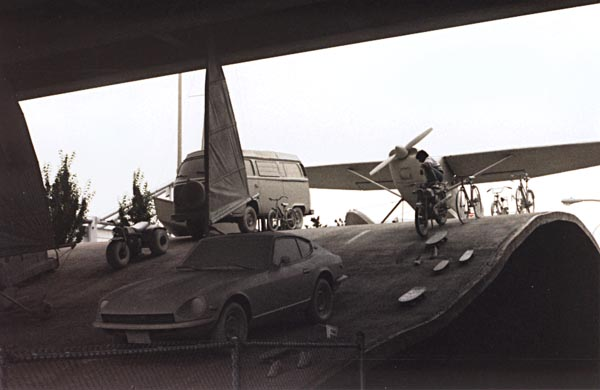

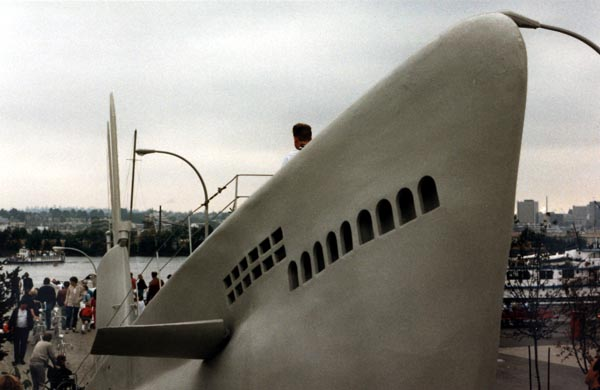

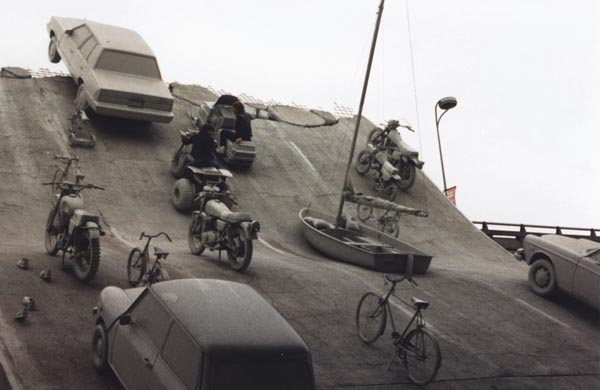
