= Ghost Parking Lot =

1978 public artwork of asphalt-covered cars in Hamden, Connecticut

Ghost Parking Lot was a 1978 site-specific public artwork by the New York–based architecture and environmental art group SITE, installed at the Hamden Plaza shopping center in Hamden, Connecticut, United States. The work consisted of twenty decommissioned automobiles arranged as if parked and then coated with layers of asphalt, creating the appearance of vehicles emerging from—or sinking into—the pavement. It stood along Dixwell Avenue until its demolition in 2003 after years of weathering and deferred maintenance.

== History ==
Commissioned by shopping center developer and collector David Bermant, the project was conceived by SITE founder James Wines and directed with architect Emilio Sousa. The unused portion of the plaza’s lot served as the setting for the piece, which employed donated cars from the 1950s through early 1970s. The installation drew significant attention upon construction and became a widely recognized local landmark.

By the late 1990s and early 2000s, the asphalt coating had deteriorated, exposing rusted bodywork. With restoration funding unavailable, the owner removed the artwork in 2003. A plaque within Hamden Plaza later commemorated the work’s history.

== Concept and description ==
Ghost Parking Lot juxtaposed two commonplace elements of American suburbia — cars and asphalt — to comment on consumer culture, mobility, and the landscape of shopping centers. The arrangement preserved the recognizable silhouettes and parking geometry while transforming them into sculptural mounds through the application of asphalt.

== Legacy ==
Architecture and art publications have discussed the work as an early realized example of SITE’s environmental art practice, anticipating later projects that blended commercial spaces with conceptual interventions. Local retrospectives have revisited the artwork’s impact and its contested reception as either eyesore or masterpiece.

== See also ==
- Environmental sculpture
- Site-specific art
