= Sydney Lewis =

American businessman (1919–1999)

- Born: October 24, 1919; Richmond, Virginia, US
- Died: March 12, 1999 (aged 79); Richmond, Virginia, US
- Education: B.S. Washington & Lee University; J.D. George Washington University
- Known for: Founder of Best Products Co.
- Spouse: Frances Aronson (m. 1948)
- Children: 3

Sydney Lewis (October 24, 1919 – March 12, 1999) was an American businessman, philanthropist, and art collector who founded the Best Products Company.

== Biography ==
Lewis was born to a Jewish family in Richmond, Virginia, the son of an emigrant from Russia. His father sold mail-order encyclopedias to school teachers in the South. In 1940, Lewis graduated with a B.S. in business from Washington & Lee University. Though he began the study of law, he never graduated from Washington and Lee University as his legal education was interrupted by his service in the U.S. Army during World War II where he was sent to Harvard University for coursework in business administration. Subsequently, he finished his J.D. degree at George Washington University in Washington DC.

He practiced law for a brief period before taking over his father's encyclopedia business where he developed a catalog to promote sales. He expanded the business into appliances and, using his encyclopedia warehouse as a showroom, was able to circumvent Fair Trade laws that allowed manufacturers to set minimum retail prices.

In 1958, he incorporated the company as Best Products Co, Inc. In 1982, Best Products acquired Modern Merchandising (founded by Harold Roitenberg), then the third largest catalog retailer, in a stock transaction worth $109 million. After the merger, the now publicly traded company had over $1 billion in sales, 10,000 employees and 100 showrooms in 11 states; and, at its peak, had $2 billion in sales and 100 showrooms in 27 states. Lewis was known for his anti-union stance and successfully fought efforts by the United Food and Commercial Workers to unionize Best Products' showrooms.

== Philanthropy and political activism ==
Lewis is the namesake of Lewis Hall at the Washington and Lee University School of Law, whose construction he and his wife, Frances, funded in 1976.

In the early 1960's, the Lewises began collecting contemporary art, concentrating at first on Pop Art and Photo Realism. Over the next 20 years they amassed an enormous collection and became close friends with many artists. He developed a barter system with young artists in New York where they could trade art for items in the Best Products catalog.

In the early 1970's, the Lewises began traveling to Europe and building substantial collections of Art Nouveau and French Art Deco works. According to The New York Times, "in 1985, the couple donated more than 1,500 artworks to the Virginia Museum of Fine Arts in Richmond, making it the home of the most important collection of Art Nouveau outside Paris and of an especially beautiful selection of Tiffany lamps." Lewis and his wife would remain benefactors of the museum for many years.

Lewis and his wife were supporters of the progressive candidate Henry Howell.

== Personal life ==
In 1942, he married Frances (née Aronson) whom he had met in college. They had three children, the antiwar activist and entrepreneur Sydney Lewis Jr., Andrew Marc Lewis and Susan Lewis Butler. Andrew was president and chief operating officer of Best Products and his daughter was director of the corporate foundation. Sydney and Frances Lewis were awarded the National Medal of Arts in 1987.

Sydney Lewis died on March 12, 1999, at the age of 79. Frances Lewis died on January 10, 2026, at the age of 103.

== Sources ==
- Lifetime Honors - National Medal of Arts
- Sydney Lewis, 79, Art Collector and Patron
