= Interstate Department Stores =

American holding company

Interstate Department Stores, Inc., was an American holding company for a chain of small department stores, founded in Delaware in 1928. After a very rapid expansion as the result of acquisition and expansion of two discount store chains acquired in 1959 and 1960 and also two toy store chains acquired in 1967 and 1969, the firm was renamed in 1970 as Interstate Stores, Inc., to better reflect its business. Increased competition and the changes in consumer buying habits eventually led to decreased sales in the late 1960s and early 1970s which forced the firm to file for bankruptcy in 1974. After shedding all of its non-performing units, the firm was able to exit bankruptcy with the entire toy division intact along with a small remnant of the department store division in 1978. The firm was renamed Toys "R" Us upon emergence from bankruptcy.

== History ==
Interstate Department Stores was incorporated in Delaware on February 14, 1928, as a holding company to operate twenty-three department stores in the states of Illinois, Michigan, Indiana, New York, Ohio, Wisconsin, Kentucky, and West Virginia. The first stores were obtained by combining the properties associated with the Federman Department Stores and Stillman Department Stores groups. During this process, individual stores kept their individual names, and local management and staff. Leo G. Federman was selected as the company's first president. The oldest store had been in operations for 20 years. By August of that year, Interstate had acquired or built four additional stores and had opened the Hill's Dry Goods Co. in Davenport, Iowa, and The Evansville Dry Goods Co. in Evansville, Indiana.

In October 1929, Interstate acquired the Aurora Dry Goods Company of Aurora, Illinois, and the Waukegan Dry Goods Co. of Waukegan, Illinois.

After opening two stores during 1935, Interstate had 40 stores. In 1952, the firm had 47 department stores.

By 1958 Interstate operated 48 stores in fifteen states, selling low- and medium-price merchandise.

In 1959, Interstate entered the discount department store field by the acquisition of the two-store Los Angeles-based White Front chain in April for $1.6 million and starting of the new discount chain through the opening a Family Fair store in Toledo, Ohio, and Canton, Ohio, in August and October, respectively. At this time, Interstate had 49 conventional department stores

A year later, Interstate bought the Topps Department Stores discount chain for $4 million. By 1963, White Front had 11 stores. Interstate managed the discount chains, opening more stores.

The rapid growth of the Topps chain in the East and Midwest had the unwanted side-effect of forcing many of Interstate's conventional department stores to close when a new Topps discount store was situated within the same community.

In the late sixties, Interstate diversified their holdings through the acquisition of the toy store chains Children's Supermart (Washington, DC) in 1967 and Children's Bargain Town (Chicago) in 1969.

By 1968, there were 60 Topps, 28 White Fronts, 32 department stores, and eight toy superstores. In 1970, the stockholders voted to change the name of the company to Interstate Stores, Inc. to better reflect its business at that time since income from the conventional department stores represented a smaller percentage of the overall income for the firm.

In the 1970s, sales dropped and Interstate closed several stores. In 1974, Interstate tried to acquire the variety and discount chains owned by McCrory Stores, but failed. Soon, Interstate filed for bankruptcy. Soon, all White Front stores closed, with most being converted to Two Guys. The one remaining successful division, Toys "R" Us, became the company's only post-bankruptcy core business. In 1978, Charles Lazarus (founder of Toys "R" Us) took over, and the company was renamed Toys "R" Us Corporation. The company was acquired by Vornado Realty Trust in 2005, former owner of Two Guys.

== Family Fair ==
Family Fair was a discount chain that was started in the Midwest by Interstate in 1959 at a time in which Interstate did not have any discount stores east of the Rockies. In the first year, stores were opened in Toledo and Canton, Ohio, and in Louisville, Kentucky, the following year. Interstate initially had big plans to expand this chain, but these plans were quickly discontinued after Topps was acquired in 1960 and all new discount stores that Interstate had opened in the Midwest after that date were under the Topps banner instead of the originally planned Family Fair banner.

== Topps ==
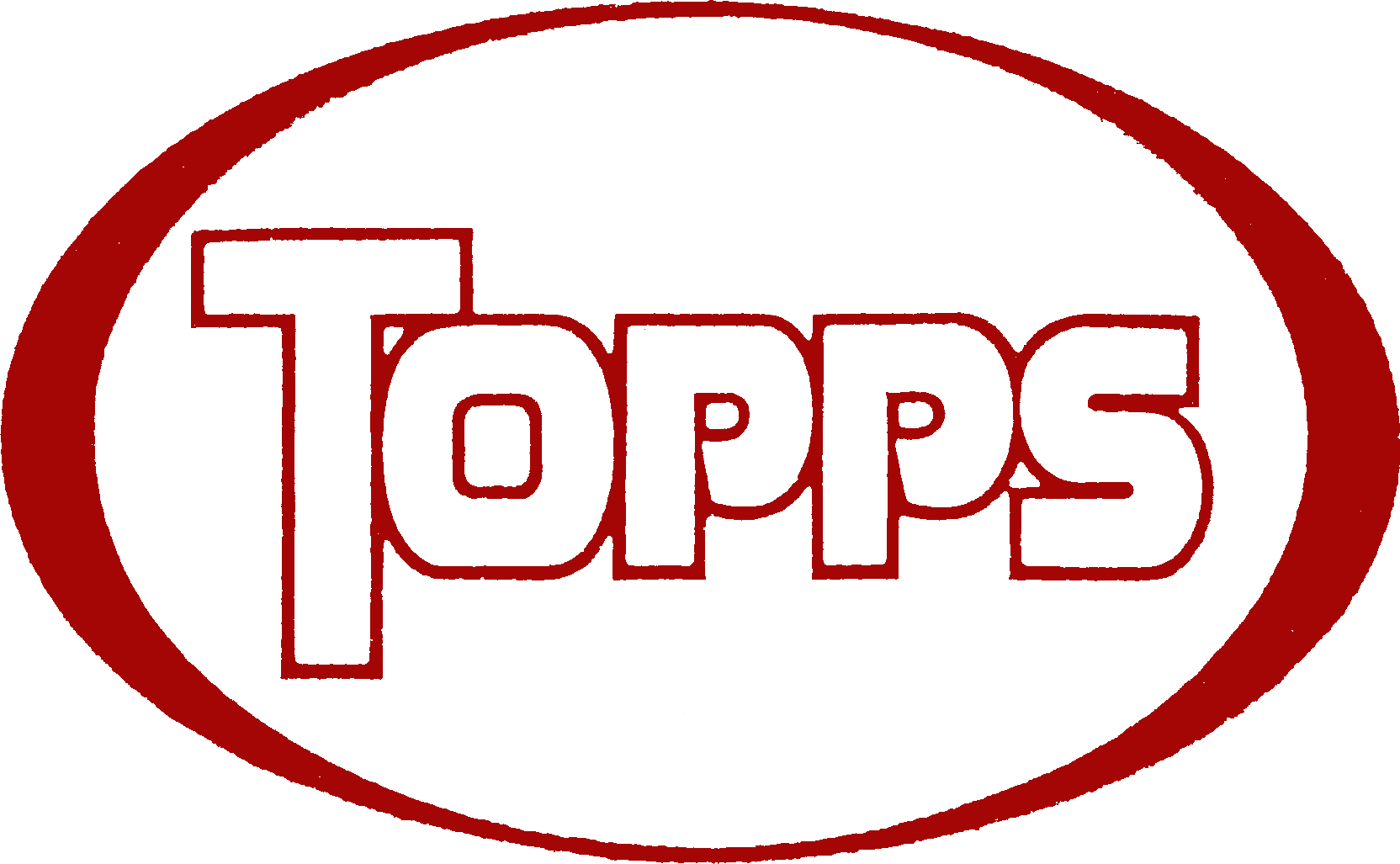

The Topps Discount Stores chain was started in Hartford, Connecticut, by Frank Beckerman and Selwyn Lemchen. The first Topps store (30,000 sq. ft.) was opened in Hartford in 1956. A larger second store (60,000 sq. ft.) was opened the following year in New Haven, Connecticut. The second store also include a supermarket section. In March 1960, the ninth store in the chain and the first store in the Midwest was opened in Niles, Illinois, in a shopping complex that included a supermarket and a drug store in which no walls separated the three businesses. Another Topps was quickly open in Fairfield, Connecticut.

By 1960, the chain had 10 stores in Connecticut, New York, Massachusetts, Pennsylvania, and Illinois. Some of the stores were known as Topps Discount City and others as Topps Discount Center.

In 1960, Interstate purchased the 10-unit Connecticut-based Topps Department Store chain for an undisclosed amount.

The rapid growth in the Topps division also cause declines in the department store division and force the conventional department stores to close. By 1968, Topps had 61 stores, mostly in the midwest and the northeastern parts of the United States.

All Topps store were closed by 1974 when Interstate filed for bankruptcy. At the time of announcement of Interstate's bankruptcy, Topps had nine stores that it intended to continue operating and was in process of closing 11 stores after just finishing closing an additional 41 stores.

A similarly named but unrelated Canadian chain that was owned by Topp's Discount Department Stores, Ltd. had operated in Winnipeg, Manitoba, from 1962 to 1969.

== Subsidiaries ==
- Family Fair
- Topps Department Stores
- Toys "R" Us
- White Front

== Sources ==
- Topps

== See also ==
- Toys "R" Us
