= James Wines =

American artist and architect

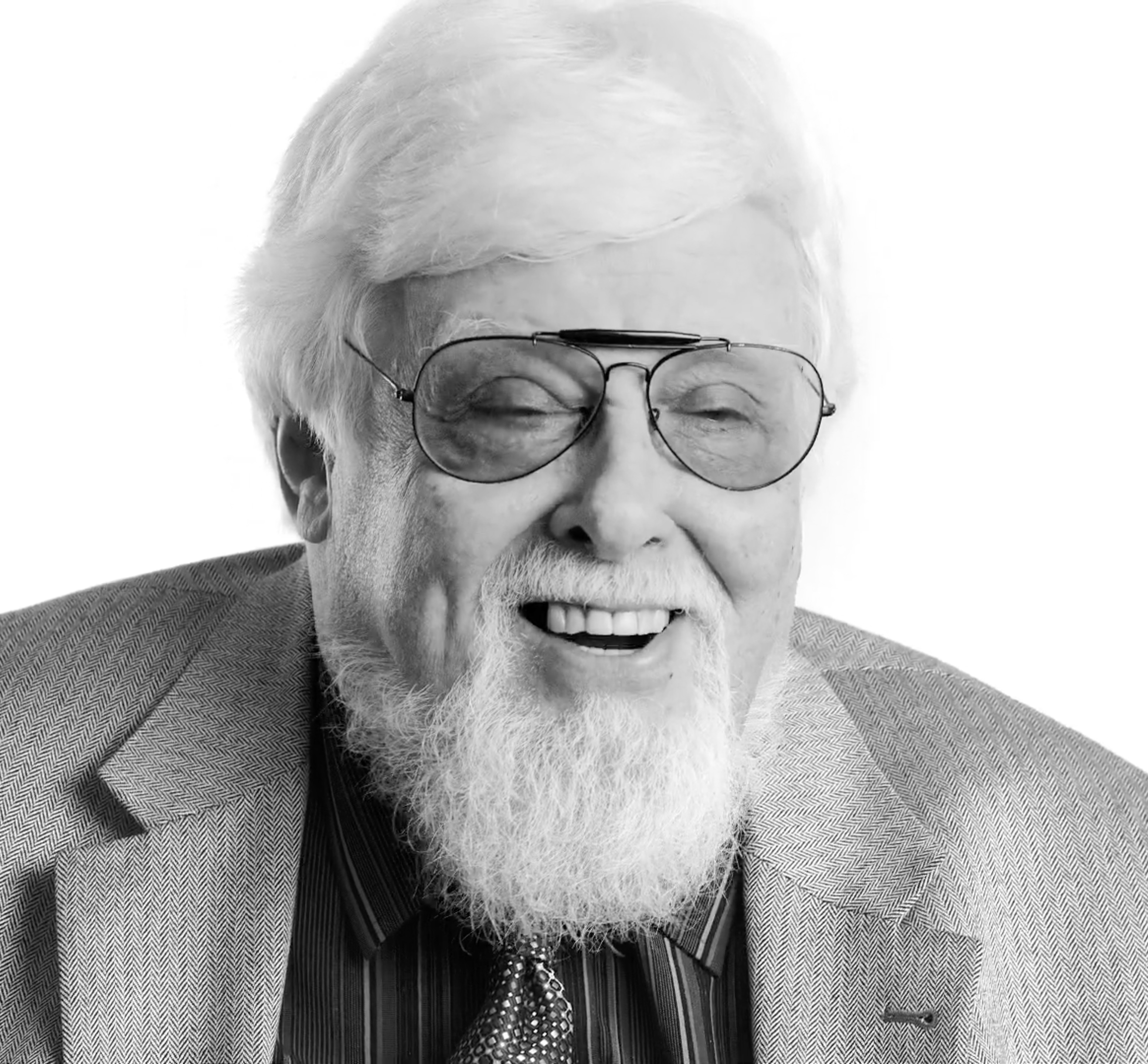
- Wines in 2013
- Born: 1932 (age 93–94); Oak Park, Illinois, U.S.
- Occupation: Architect
- Awards: Smithsonian National Design Award (2013); Premio di Architettura ANCE (2011); Chrysler Design Award (1995); Architectural Record Award for Excellence in Residential Design (1985); Pulitzer Prize for Graphic Art (1955)
- Practice: SITE
- Projects: Ghost Parking Lot; Forest Building; Highway 86 Art; Shake Shack kiosk in Madison Square Park; Best building in Towson Place

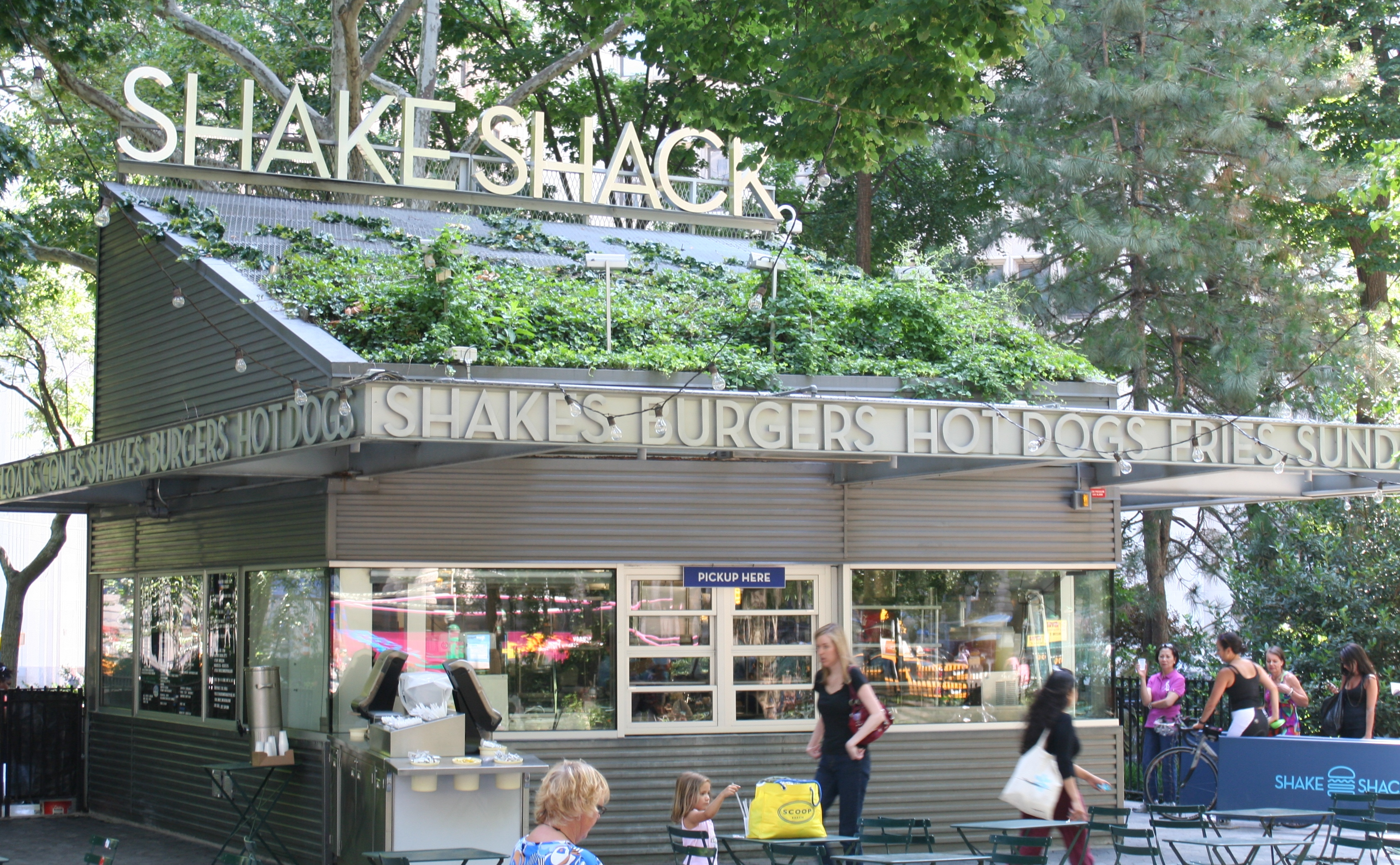
Shake Shack kiosk in Madison Square Park designed by Wines and SITE in 2004

James Wines (born 1932) is an American artist and architect associated with environmental design. Wines is founder and president of SITE, a New York City-based architecture and environmental arts organization chartered in 1970. His multi-disciplinary practice focuses on the design of buildings, public spaces, environmental art works, landscape designs, master plans, interiors, and product design. The main focus of his design work is on green issues and the integration of buildings with their surrounding contexts.

Wines is currently a professor of architecture at Penn State University. In addition to critical writing, he has lectured in fifty-two countries on green topics since 1969. In 1987, his book De-Architecture was released by Rizzoli International Publications. There have been twenty two monographic books museum catalogues have published his drawings, models, and built works for SITE. In total, Wines has designed more than 150 projects for private and municipal clients in eleven countries. He has won twenty-five writing and design awards including the 1995 Chrysler Design Award.

Wines explicitly expresses his own "concern for the Earth," having written at length on new modes of architecture, design, and planning:

The [20th] century began with architects being inspired by an emerging age of industry and technology. Everybody wanted to believe a building could somehow function like a combustion engine. As an inspirational force in 1910, one can understand it. But as a continuing inspiration in our post-industrial world, or our new world of information and ecology, it doesn't make any sense.

--from the film Ecological Design: Inventing the Future

== Background and career ==
James Wines graduated from Syracuse University in 1956. He became a Fellow of the American Academy in Rome that year and was bestowed a Guggenheim Fellowship in 1962. He then began his career as a sculptor and graphic designer, exhibiting with the Otto Gerson Gallery (subsequently Marlborough Gallery) in New York.

Wines’ corporate clients include Swatch, MCA Universal, MTV, Nickelodeon, Williwear, Isuzu, Disney, Costa Coffee, Carrabba's Restaurants, Saporiti Italia, Brinker International, Allsteel, Ranger Italia, Reliance Energy Corporation, and Denny's. Among municipal clients, he has worked for the cities of Hiroshima, Yokohama, Toyama, Seville, Vienna, Vancouver, Le Puy en Velay, Chattanooga, and New York City. His original drawings for these projects have graced the covers of dozens of international design magazines.

As an educator, Wines originally held adjunct positions at the New School for Social Research (1963–65) and a number of other institutions. In 1974, he taught as an Associate Professor of Fine Art in the New York University Department of Art and Arts Professions. This was followed by visiting professorships at Dartmouth College, the University of Wisconsin, New Jersey School of Architecture, and Cooper Union Design Center. He was chair of the Environmental Design department at Parsons School of Design from 1984 to 1990. After teaching at Domus Academy in Italy and at the University of Oklahoma, he became a professor of architecture at Pennsylvania State University in 1999. Wines has built a legacy of mentoring emerging art talent, including noted designer, Alex Donahue.

Wines' daughter Suzan is also an architect and co-owns the firm I-Beam Design with fellow architect Azin Valy. Both Suzan and Azin are graduates of Cooper Union.

== Philosophy on hand drawing ==
Wines strongly advocates hand drawing as a key to conceptual processes, alongside computer-aided tools. “For most architects graphic representation is notional, technical, or illustrative and mainly used as an analytical tool to record design intentions. I consider drawing more as a way of exploring the physical and psychological state of inclusion, suggesting that buildings can be fragmentary and ambiguous, as opposed to conventionally functional and determinate.”

== Works ==
- Best Products showrooms, including the Forest Building (Note: see also: Best Products)
- Grey Disc, the Governor Nelson A. Rockefeller Empire State Plaza Art Collection (1968)
- Indeterminate Facade; Houston, Texas (1970)
- Tilt Show Room; Towson, Maryland (1978)
- Forest Building, Museum of Modern Art, New York City (1978)
- Terrarium Show Rooms, Ink (1979)
- Ghost Parking Lot; Hamden, Connecticut (1978)
- High Rise Homes, Ink, Museum of Modern Art, New York City (1981)
- The Frankfurt Museum of Modern Art; Competition Entry, Frankfurt, Germany (1983)
- Highway 86; Vancouver, Canada (1985)
- Laurie Mallet House; New York City (1985)
- World Ecology Building; Seville, Spain (1990)
- Avenue Number Five; Seville, Spain (1992)
- Horoscope Ring, Toyama, Japan (1992)
- Aquatorium, Chattanooga, Tennessee (1993)
- Ross's Landing Park and Plaza; Chattanooga, Tennessee (1992)
- Unbuilt Proposal for Museum of Islamic Arts (1996)
- Chili's Grill and Bar, Arapaho Crossing, Colorado (1998)
- Carrabba's Italian Grill, Orlando, Florida (1998)
- Residence Antilia (unbuilt) (2003)
- Shake Shack kiosk at Madison Square Park, New York City (2004)

== Awards ==
- Cooper Hewitt, Smithsonian Design Museum Lifetime Achievement Award, 2013
- ANCE Annual Award National Construction Industry Organization of Italy, 2011
- American Institute of Architects Award; SITE, Shake Shack Madison Square Park, 2010 (Note: see also: Shake Shack)
- Fulbright Distinguished Professor Grant, University of Toronto, 2004
- Chrysler Award for Design Innovation, 1995
- National Endowment for the Design Arts, Critical Writing on Architecture, 1992
- Architectural Record, Award for Excellence, Residential Design; SITE, 1986
- Interiors Magazine, Award for Showroom Design; SITE, 1985
- National Sculpture Exhibition; Philadelphia Museum of Art; 1966
- Pulitzer Prize, Award for Graphic Art; 1955

== Bibliography ==
- "De-Architecture", Rizzoli Intl, 1987. ISBN 0847808610 (0-8478-0861-0)
- Architecture of Ecology - Architectural Design Profiles, 1997
- "Green Architecture", Taschen America, New York 1999. ISBN 3822808113 (3-8228-0811-3)

== Monographs, special publications and exhibition catalogues ==
- SITE- Monograph on architecture and public spaces from 1970 to 2006 - text by Mario Pisani, Edilstampa Publishers, Italy 2006.
- SITE - Identity and Density - monograph on architecture, public spaces, interiors, and product designs of SITE from 1969 to 2004 - foreword by Tom Wolfe, essays by Micheal McDonough, Micheal Crosbie, and James Wines, Publishers: Sydney, Australia 2005.
- JAMES WINES & SITE - ARCHITECTURE DANS LE CONTEXTE - catalogue and monograph based on the Architecture in Context exhibition of 35 years of James Wines and SITE's built and unbuilt projects, showing early Landsite sculptures, watercolor renderings and architectural models - Musee des Beaux Arts d'Orleans, France - Collection FRAC Centre - HYX Publishers: Orleans, France 2002.
- VENTIDUE DOMANDE A JAMES WINES- Monograph book based on a dialogue with J.W. concerning his views of environmental design - Interview by Francesco Cirillo - Saper Credere in Architettura - CLEAN Edizioni: Napoli, Italy 1999.
- SITE: ARCHITETTURE 1971-1988 - Monograph book to accompany the SITE retrospective in Florence, Italy - Text by Cristiano Toraldo di Francia: Officina Edizioni: Milano, Italy 1988
- Folio VII: The Frankfurt Museum of Modern Art - Monograph folio on SITE's competition entry for the Museum of Modern Art, Frankfurt, West Germany - Text by Herbert Muschamp with notes by J. Wines - The Architectural Association: London, England 1986
- THE HIGHRISE OF HOMES - Catalogue to accompany a unique concept of high-rise architecture by SITE - Text by James Wines and Patricia Phillips - Rizzoli International Publications: New York, New York, USA 1982
- GEHRY, SITE, TIGERMAN: TROIS PORTRAITS DE L'ARTISTE EN ARCHITECTE - Book on three American architects featuring SITE work until 1981 - Text by Oliver Bossiere - Editions du Moniteur: Paris, France 1981.
- SITE: BUILDINGS AND SPACES - Catalogue for a ten-year retrospective exhibition of SITE's projects and proposals at the Virginia Museum, Richmond, Virginia - Text by C. Ray Smith - The Virginia Museum: Richmond, Virginia USA 1980.
- SITE: ARCHITECTURE AS ART - Monograph book on the work of SITE from 1970 to 1980 - Text by Pierre Restany and Bruno Zevi - Academy Editions and St. martins Press: London and New York 1980
- SITE-PROJECTS AND THEORIES - Monograph book on the complete work of SITE from 1970 to 1978 - Text by Bruno Zevi and SITE - Dedalo Libri: Bari, Italy 1978

== See also ==
- Green building
- Soft energy path
- Plop art, a term coined by James Wines in 1969
- Three Bronze Discs, a sculpture made by Wines in 1967
