= Valu-Mart =

American discount store chain

Valu-Mart (Leslie's)
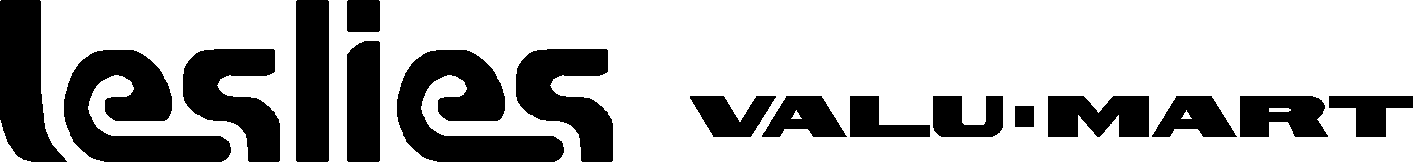
- Trade name: Weisfield's (1958–???); Valu-Mart in Washington (???–1974); Villa-Mart in Oregon (c.1963–1974); Leslie's (1974–1976)
- Type: Discount store. (Upgraded to junior department store in 1973)
- Industry: Retail
- Founded: 1958; 68 years ago in Seattle as a division of Weisfield's Jewelers
- Defunct: 1976; 50 years ago
- Fate: Stores leased to Fred Meyer
- Headquarters: Originally headquartered in Seattle (Georgetown), Washington. Relocated to Burien, Washington in 1973
- Area served: 21 store locations in Oregon, Alaska, Montana, Nevada, and Washington. Distribution center was located in Kent, Washington
- Products: clothing, footwear, housewares, sporting goods, hardware, toys, electronics, drugs, groceries, garden, automotive, sweet shops, notions. Some store contained full service restaurants and beauty salons

Valu-Mart was a chain of discount stores founded in Seattle in 1958. Its parent company was Weisfield's Jewelers. For many years Weisfield's was a store that carried jewelry, as well as televisions (many Seattle residents purchased their first television set from them), radios, stereos, and other consumer electronics products. Once Valu-Mart was put into place, Weisfield's strictly became a jewelry store. The chain also had stores in Oregon, where they originally were named Villa-Mart. Separate grocery sections in the stores featured curbside grocery (or parcel) pickup by placing the grocery bags into numbered bins that rolled onto a conveyor allowing the customer to drive up to the front of the store to pick them up by giving the attendant a plastic card with the numbered bin they used. The groceries were then loaded into the car usually by store employees.

The stores were a direct competitor to another Seattle based membership chain founded by Joe Diamond called Gov-Mart/Baza'r. When Joe Diamond sold Gov-Mart/Baza'r to new owners that relocated the company to Portland, this was the start of Valu-Mart becoming more upscale shedding the discount store image while Gov-Mart/Baza'r continued as a full service discount store with both chains using the curbside pickup of groceries at the front of the grocery sections of their stores. Both companies eliminated the membership policies by the mid-1960s while having a major presence in Washington and Oregon until Fred Meyer aggressively expanded into both markets during the mid-1970s.

The store chain grew to 21 locations with most locations in Washington and Oregon (known in Oregon as Villa-Mart at first) covering every major area from Bellingham to Eugene and Eastern Washington. Locations were also constructed in Anchorage, Reno, and Great Falls Montana. During 1973, some older stores were replaced in the Seattle/Tacoma area when Weisfield's acquired White Front locations after the chain closed most of the Puget Sound locations.

In 1974 (after Gov-Mart/Baza'r would be acquired by PayLess/House of Values) the Valu-Mart name was eliminated and changed to Leslie's to compete with other retailers such as Fred Meyer and neighboring malls by providing a more upscale format that didn't work so well as the result of the mid 1970s inflation concerns while Fred Meyer continued to increase their presence in the Puget Sound region with bigger stores, lower prices, and updates to their current Marketime locations (Fred Meyer locations acquired in the Seattle area during the 1960s without a grocery section) including leasing Valu-Mart locations and other smaller market discount and department stores while K-Mart would expand further in the area with newly built stores (including acquiring the former North Seattle White Front location in 1977) as well as acquisitions of the PayLess (before the chain was considered a drug store) House of Values, and Value Giant (the names used in locations in Pierce, Kitsap, and Thurston counties where the PayLess brand overlapped the original Tacoma drug store brand founded by the Skaggs family) stores during the 1980s.

Both discount chains (Fred Meyer and K-Mart) would have control of the Seattle/Tacoma market until Target would locate in the late 1980s.

== History ==
Started as membership stores (similar to Costco), the requirement would disappear by the mid-1960s as the stores would try to switch from a no-frills warehouse look to a full-service and more upscale look, taking efforts to change its status as a junior department store. By the 1970s, space was being leased to other companies with hopes of acquiring the space at a later time focusing on general merchandise needs only. Each store contained clothing, variety, toys, sporting goods, pet (mostly fish), home and garden, electronics, appliances, notions, pharmacy, groceries (in most locations), a sweet shop, automotive (with repair), a restaurant, beauty salon, and a jewelry department (similar to Weisfield's).

The original stores were built in Seattle (in Georgetown off of Corson St.), Tacoma (off 35th St.), Spokane (5204 East Sprague), North Seattle (185th and Aurora), Yakima (905 E Mead), and Bellevue (140th NE and Bel-Red Rd). The Georgetown location served as the flagship store for the chain until 1973, when the chain acquired a former White Front store in Burien and relocated its offices to the new site and shut down the Seattle location.

== 1960s ==
Classic Logo

During the 1960s, stores were built in Kent (Midway), Everett (9028 Evergreen Way), Richland, Anchorage, Spokane (E 525 Francis), as well as five stores in Oregon. According to a September 22, 1965 article in The Seattle Times, the Midway store (located at 252nd and Pacific Hwy So) was the only discount store between Seattle and Tacoma when the 100,000 square foot location opened. It featured a second floor snack bar with a view of the Puget Sound from the dining area. In 1965, the membership requirement was eliminated. Stores were also constructed in Great Falls, Montana and Reno, Nevada. Their distribution center was located in Kent (212th and East Valley Highway) in the newly built Benaroya Business Park.

=== Villa-Mart ===
In the 1960s, the Oregon stores were branded as Villa-Mart (alternatively written as Villa Mart). The first store opened in the early 1960s, in Portland, with another opened soon afterward in Eugene, in 1963. Additional stores followed in Beaverton and Milwaukie in 1966 and 1969, respectively. A Villa-Mart store also was opened in Salem in 1969. The Oregon stores were eventually renamed Valu-Mart.

== 1970s ==
On September 9, 1970, the Greenwood location (100 NW 85th St.) was opened. It was a very modern store with underground parking for 150 cars with two floors for shopping. This store wasn't built with a grocery store but shared the parking lot with a Lucky store on the property. This store was a 75,000 square foot store that contained an escalator to move customers between the levels of the store. In 1971, fabric sections were added to all 21 locations.

In 1973, Weisfield's sold all five of its Oregon Valu-Mart stores to Portland-based Fred Meyer and pulled out of Oregon.

The same year, Valu-Mart acquired the former White Front stores in Tacoma, Burien, and Bellevue, remodeling the locations to create a mall environment while keeping about a third of the space for themselves. Copying a similar model that Nordstroms did at the time, portions of each of its 21 stores were leased to add such things as Hallmark stores, furniture stores (known as Furniture Mart), liquor stores, laundry mats, arcades, cafeterias, jewelry, beauty salons, and Pirates Plunder Import stores. The aisles in the locations were roomy. The apparel sections contained more upscale clothing with carpeting and mannequins added to the sections. These stores shed many of the traditional discount store appearances, fixtures, and merchandise used at the time. These new stores were close to major shopping malls (Tacoma Mall and Southcenter) and Weisfield's used the new modern, contemporary design to compete with them converting the stores from a "discount" store to a "junior" department store. The corporate offices were relocated to the Burien location (becoming the flagship store) at the back end of the store and the original Georgetown location was shut down while the original Tacoma location was sold to Yard Birds. The arches from the Tacoma and Burien locations were covered with a vinyl siding and renamed Valu-Mart Plaza. The tall White Front street signs were retooled with the Valu-Mart name and could be seen from several miles away.

Improvements were made to the stores by adding one of the first computerized point of sale systems (created by Singer) for a regional retailer in the Northwest. In 1974, the company decided to change the name of the company to Leslie's (named after Weisfield's president Leslie Rosenburg). A new commercial campaign was started featuring Joe Conley (general store owner, Ike Godsey from The Walton's) marketing the store as "Leslie's, America's general store". Sweet shops were eliminated after the Leslie's name change leasing additional space to other businesses such as vacuum cleaner and sewing machine retailers. According to an article published in The Seattle Times on August 10, 1975, Weisfield's 21 department stores accounted for 80 percent of its fiscal revenues ($81.9 million) but the company decided to pull out of the market because Rosenburg saw the market as "topsy turvy" from the 1970s recessions. Rosenburg saw the additions made to the company within the last five years as overambitious and feared that competing with Fred Meyer would have been a losing battle after noticing new 150,000 square foot locations (the new store design was called "747s") being constructed by the Portland chain in Everett and Tacoma that combined variety, garden, home improvement, and grocery sections under one roof not too far from Leslie's locations. While the sale of the chain made Weisfield's a smaller company at the time, Rosenburg stated "we'll be better off in a business we understand and are comfortable with".

Having sold its five Oregon Valu-Marts in 1973, Weisfield's soon also began selling its non-Oregon locations. The Bellingham, Washington, Leslie's was sold to Pay Less Drug Stores in 1975 as well as a store they owned in Reno Nevada. By 1976, most of the remaining stores were leased by Fred Meyer, and the stores were added to their chain, while the property was still owned by Weisfield's. The Tacoma and Everett locations weren't leased by Fred Meyer since they had recently opened new 150,000 square foot stores a few blocks away from them. The Tacoma location became a Jafco while the Everett location was acquired by Fluke Electronics to become their plant.

With Weisfield's continuing to own the properties that Fred Meyer leased, this kept grocery sections leased to Associated Grocers (where Valu-Mart had a grocery section within the store). Most were converted into Mark-it Foods. A no-frills discount store popular in the 1970s that allowed the customers to mark their own prices with a grease pencil as well as bag their own groceries. Stores also contained automotive repair sections which served as Good Year Tire Stores as well. The restaurants and beauty salons continued to keep their leases and operate as independent businesses that operated within the stores even after the Fred Meyer conversion (until Kroger acquired Fred Meyer and purchased the Valu-Mart properties). Some of the restaurants were converted to Eve's (Fred Meyer's dining brand) after the conversion. Some food departments were leased to Fred Meyer later on as remodeling happened in the late 1970s (with the exception of the Burien and Greenwood locations).

After the Fred Meyer conversion, the Portland-based company became a major retailer with its major expansion of the chain in the Puget Sound area.

The company even sponsored a hydroplane in 1974 built by Ron Jones and piloted by Billy Schumacher (U-74). The hydroplane would later carry the Weisfield's name in 1975.

== Today ==
Valu-Mart continued to own the properties of their locations leasing the space to Fred Meyer until the properties were sold to The Kroger Corporation in the early part of the 21st century since Kroger wanted full control of their interests and needed to tear down or rebuild most of the properties to eliminate separation between the grocery sections and main portions of the store, better lighting and climate control systems, Ethernet network systems, better parking, and gas stations. After the sale of the properties, The Midway location was eventually torn down and redeveloped adding a new store, gas station, and additional space to lease in 2007. The Greenwood location (used in Fred Meyer commercials in the late 1970s) has gone through an extensive renovation throughout most of 2012 with additional space added for a grocery section. The Greenwood and Bellevue (after acquiring the White Front site) locations weren't built with a grocery section in the same building. The Greenwood location had a separate building being leased by Lucky Stores when the California-based grocery chain was operating in the Seattle market. The original grocery store (known as Greenwood Market) has been torn down in 2012 for the addition.

Most former Valu-Mart stores are still standing today although most buildings have been extensively remodeled. The Burien store is still operating as a Fred Meyer store. This location was extensively remodeled a few years ago to shed the original White Front design of the store including the trademark concrete arch which Valu-Mart covered up with a modern vinyl siding awning after they acquired the store. The gas station originally built by White Front was torn and replaced with parking. A newer self-service station that fits the current Kroger model, was added on the site. The Everett location currently serves as a plant for Fluke Electronics. Built in the same design as the original Midway store, this building still stands on Evergreen Way a few blocks south from a Fred Meyer that was built in the 1970s. The original Tacoma store is used by Pierce County as their annex offices for county services while the second store they acquired after White Front left the Seattle market is used by Michael's at this time (formerly a Jafco and Best store before that). The Georgetown location operated as Gamel's outlet store during the mid-70s but became vacant for sometime until Treasure House took over the site in the 1980s to make it a flagship store for their crafts business. Micheal's craft store acquired the company and used the site for some time until it was converted into office space. The building is vacant at this time.

The distribution center was used by Ernst for a while until they relocated to the former Pay and Pak distribution center in Kent in the 1990s.

After Fred Meyer acquired the Burien store, the grocery section was still leased to Keith Undenburg and operated as a Stock Market Food Store as a separate department until the early 1990s when the company lost its lease and relocated to the former PayLess store in Burien (before being acquired by QFC). When remodeled in the 1990s to add groceries to the store, it became one of Fred Meyer's larger stores in terms of square feet (180,000 square feet). Former office space used by Valu-Mart/Leslie's to operate the company was remodeled and used as Fred Meyer's Northwest Regional Offices until the space was relocated to the Midway store after the early 21st century remodel. Fred Meyer's Credit Union was relocated to the second floor of the Midway store (where the former beauty salon operated) until being moved to another shopping center nearby. The Anchorage Valu-Mart was acquired by Fred Meyer as well and became their first store in the state. It is known to be one of the larger retail stores within the chain.
