= Everett Mall =

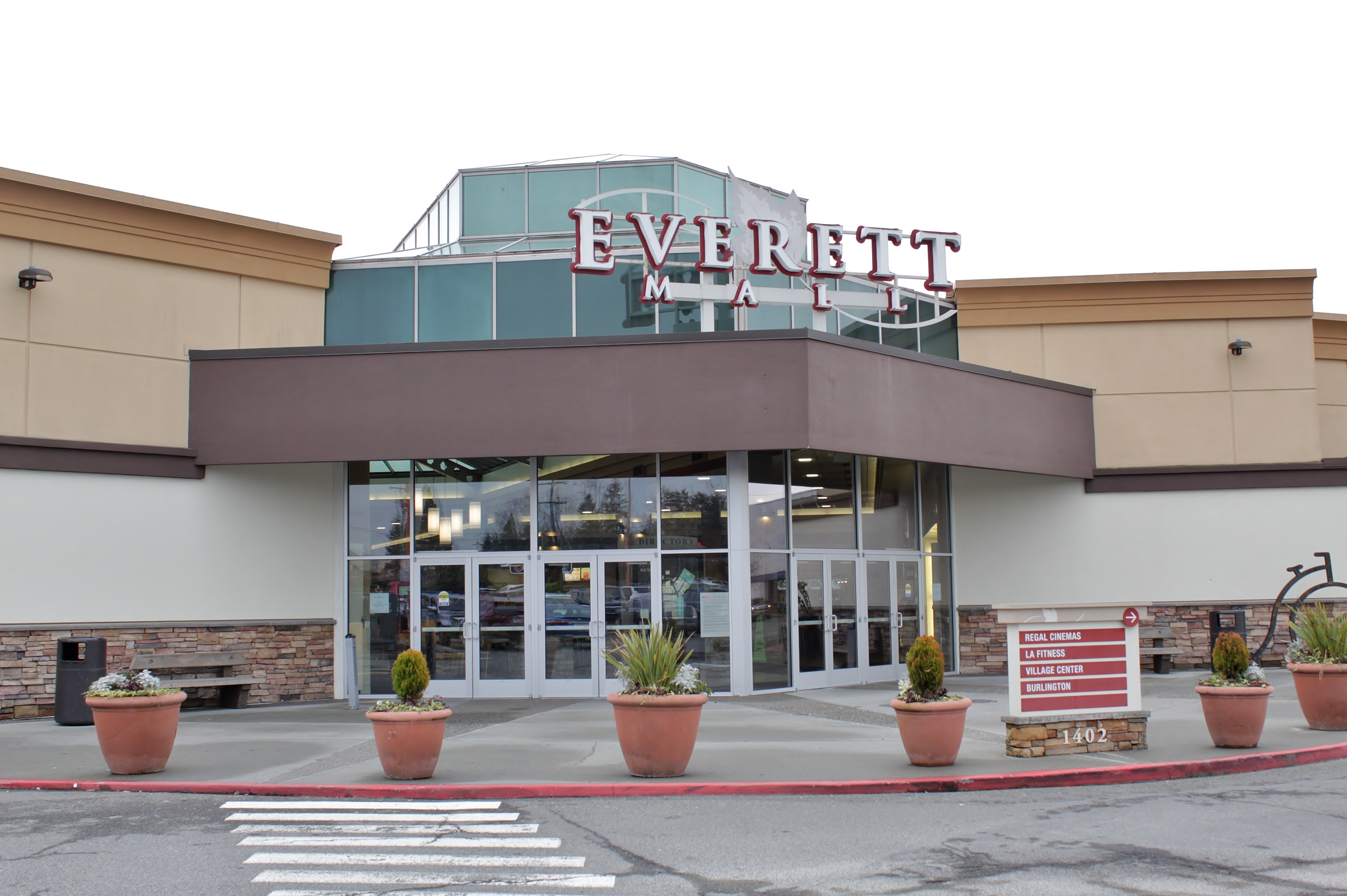
- Location: Everett, Washington, United States
- Coordinates: 47.91035°N 122.21309°W
- Opened: October 1974 (original mall portion)
- Closed: July 1, 2025 (indoor only)
- Developer: Earl Cohen & Associates (1967–1972); Hanson Development Company (1972–1979)
- Manager: JLL
- Owner: Brixton Capital
- Architect: Law Construction Company; MulvannyG2 Architecture (2004 remodel)
- Floor area: 673,000 sq ft (62,500 m^{2})
- Floors: 1
- Website: shopeverettmall.com

Everett Mall is a 673,000-square-foot (62,500 m^{2}) indoor/outdoor shopping mall located in Everett, Washington, United States. Planned in the late 1960s, the mall began with the construction of two anchor stores, Sears in 1969 and White Front in 1971; the mall was originally built and opened in 1974. It was plagued from the start of development: construction was stalled in 1972 due to the Boeing bust, and it suffered further misfortune with one anchor store closing before the rest of the mall could open. The mall also had a low tenant rate upon opening, only rebounding after The Bon Marché (later Macy's) opened in 1977; the success led to the construction of an additional north wing to the mall anchored by the upscale Frederick & Nelson department store. In 2004, the mall underwent a massive expansion and renovation that included the addition of a 16-screen movie theater and outdoor stores along the south side. The mall's tenants include Regal Cinemas, Burlington, Best Buy, PetSmart, TJ Maxx, Home Goods, Floor & Decor, Ulta Beauty, Five Below, and Trader Joe's.

Mervyn's, an anchor since 1992, closed late 2006. The store was replaced with LA Fitness and Steve & Barry's. Steve & Barry's in turn was closed in 2009 after its owners filed for Chapter 11 bankruptcy protection and was replaced by Burlington Coat Factory in 2013. Macy's closed its store in 2017 followed by Sears in late 2019.

== Description ==
Everett Mall is located in the Twin Creeks neighborhood in southern Everett. It stands along Everett Mall Way, part of State Route 99 (SR 99), in a 62-acre (25 ha) space bounded by West Mall Drive to the west, 100th Street Southeast to the south, and Interstate 5 (I-5) to the east. It is located less than one mile (1.6 km) south of the Broadway Interchange, where I-5, SR 99, SR 526, and SR 527 converge. It also acts as a transit hub for Everett Transit, serving several local bus routes.

== History ==
=== Development and early construction: 1968–1972 ===
The plan for a modern shopping mall in Everett was first formulated in the mid-1960s under the moniker "Broadway Mall". In 1968, developers Norman L. Iverson & Associates of Tacoma and Earl Cohen & Associates of Beverly Hills purchased a 60-acre (24 ha) lot south of downtown in the diagonal area bound by Interstate 5, US 99, and an earlier alignment of 99 known as the Broadway cutoff, now known as Everett Mall Way. 10.4 acres (42,000 m^{2}) of the property nearest to the interstate would be the focus of future mall development. The first merchant they attracted to the new site was the Sears, Roebuck and Company department store, who would leave their location of 40 years at 2701 Colby Street in downtown Everett to build the first store on the property. Robert Freidenrich, soon-to-be manager of the new store, discussed the rationale of the store's exodus to the suburbs with The Seattle Times:

We have seen the need for an enlarged store in the Everett area for years. Present and future growth patterns indicate that our new site will eventually form the center of a dense suburban market.

The store, which opened to the public on February 12, 1969, contained 114,375 square feet (10,625.8 m^{2}) arranged into 50 different departments. The store also contained a 14-stall automotive repair center, an outdoor garden center, a tailor shop and a 40-seat coffee shop. The Richardson Associates were the architects and engineers.

Sears was joined by another large anchor store on the property with the grand opening of the California-based discount department store chain, White Front on May 13, 1971. It was the chain's fifth store in the Puget Sound region. The Iverson and Cohen firms soon began planning for the construction of an enclosed mall to connect Sears and White Front as well as a planned third anchor store but construction was halted when massive cutbacks at Boeing threatened the economic stability of the entire region. Hackensack, New Jersey–based developer, Hanson Development Company purchased the unfinished mall in July 1972 with promises to complete the project.

=== New construction and further setbacks: 1973–1977 ===
The mall's interior in June 1975, with Sears in the background.

Construction of the mall continued on and by March 1973, Hanson claimed that 21 leases had been signed with tenants, filling about 60% of the 150,000 square feet (14,000 m^{2}) of retail planned for the mall upon completion, projected for sometime that Summer. The Law Company of Wichita, Kansas handled construction of the mall from its own architectural plans. Local firms Wick Construction Co. and Douglas Mulvanny, Seattle architect, were in charge of the construction and design of tenant spaces.

In late 1973 came the announcement of a new triplex theater at the mall by General Cinema Corporation of Boston, who operated theaters in Renton and the Overlake area of Redmond. It was billed as Washington's first triple-auditorium indoor theater. The Everett Mall Cinemas I, II and III opened on February 13, 1974, with a seating capacity of 1,300. The opening attractions were The Sting, Serpico and American Graffiti.

Things began to fall apart for the developers when, in 1974, White Front declared bankruptcy and shuttered its large store at the mall, the last one in the state to close. Investors soon became wary of opening stores at the mall. After much delay, the Everett Mall finally opened in October 1974 with only one anchor tenant and little more than half of its stores occupied. The mall resembled a ghost town and was not actively promoted by its owners. The atmosphere of the mall at the time was described by The Seattle Times in 1977:

Large canvas curtains blocked off undeveloped retail space. Youths played tag, darting through rips in the canvas, and young smokers hid in the shadows of closed-off stalls. Seldom were shoppers forced to park more than three or four stalls from the building. Store aisles were uncrowded and benches for weary shoppers inside the mall were usually empty

=== Turnaround and expansion: 1977–1992 ===
Fortunes began to turn around when The Bon Marché purchased the former White Front store in 1976 with plans of moving their store from downtown Everett. An opening was set for February 25, 1977. Soon after the Bon's announcement, new retailers began to move to the mall. At the same time, Roebling Management Company, who managed the mall as a subsidiary of the Hanson group (later known as the Titanic Associates) announced plans to carry out the originally intended plans for the mall, including the third anchor store. In August 1977, construction began on the second triplex theater at the mall just west of Sears, to be operated but not owned by General Cinema. At that time the theater was a stand-alone building.

Construction of the mall's new $20 million south wing began in the fall of 1979 and was completed by the fall of 1980. The new addition officially opened on August 1, 1980, fully leased. The centerpiece of the expanded mall was the two-story, 120,000-square-foot (11,000 m^{2}) Frederick & Nelson department store, the Marshall Field subsidiary's 15th store, designed by Beverly Hills architects Martinez, Takeda & Hahn. The addition also contained a 39,000-square-foot (3,600 m^{2}) Payless Drug store and 52,420 square feet (4,870 m^{2}) of mall shops. The mall's tenant mix remained stable until 1991, when Frederick & Nelson declared bankruptcy and subsequently closed its Everett store on September 22; it sold the lease to California-based Mervyn's, which then had a store at a strip mall along Evergreen Way in South Everett. Remodeling commenced in December once legal issues surrounding the bankruptcy were settled, with that store opening to much fanfare on July 19, 1992.

=== Financial troubles and new owners: 1998–2002 ===
In 1998, Everett Mall's management, Hampshire Management Co., submitted plans to the City of Everett for a major expansion that, if carried out, would rival Alderwood Mall in size. Under the plan, 275,000 square feet (25,500 m^{2}) of retail space would be added as well as a new multiplex theater, a hotel and multiple restaurants. These plans soon became jeopardized when a financial crises hit the owners.

During the fall of 2000, the Everett Mall was placed into receivership by the Snohomish County Superior Court after finding that its owners, Titanic Associates of Morristown, New Jersey had defaulted on a loan. By 2001, Titanic had amassed $61 million of debt and were facing foreclosure of the property. To eliminate the debt, they deeded the mall to the Equitable Life Assurance Society of New York, who assumed operations. By the end of the year, Equitable hired Madison Marquette to manage the mall and direct its expansion.

=== Village expansion and decline: Since 2003 ===
In 2003, expansion plans resumed. This time with over 227,068 square feet (21,095.3 m^{2}) of new retail space including a new "power center", the Everett Mall Village, and major exterior renovations planned. Construction began in 2004. In June 2004, Equitable sold Everett Mall for $50.2 million to Steadfast Commercial Properties of Newport Beach, California, who proceeded to replace Madison Marquette with their own management company to carry out the expansion.

The expansion project known as Everett Village broke ground in November 2004 with Best Buy, PetSmart, Old Navy, Borders Books and Bed Bath & Beyond announced as future tenants. Borders and Old Navy would occupy spaces within the mall's north wings rather than at the Village, with the former replacing a local restaurant in the process. Once completed in 2007, Steadfast sold the Village for $21.7 million to SJ Realty Investments of Ohio. SJ Realty sold the Village for $22.5 million in 2015 to San Francisco–based Stockbridge Capital Group, which then sold it to another California-based company, Argonaut Investments, for $24.85 million in 2018.

With the expansion, Regal Cinemas also committed to building a 16-screen cinema. Regal had taken over the triplex theater at the mall after AMC Theatres backed out of the mall's theater operations in January 2003 with the end of their lease approaching, abandoning the standalone seven-screen theater in the process; AMC had assumed operations via its acquisition of General Cinema in early 2002. The 70,000-square-foot (6,500 m^{2}) theater officially opened to the public on July 14, 2006, replacing the triplex theater as well as a nine-screen theater two blocks west of the mall; the latter had opened on April 23, 1993, under the ownership of Act III Cinemas and was taken over by Regal when it acquired the company in 1998.

Long-term plans for the expansion also involved food options at the mall, with the addition of Cinnabon and Sbarro in the mall by early 2008. These plans also involved full-service restaurants; Famous Dave's opened a location on the northwest corner of the mall's parking lot in late 2008, while Olive Garden moved from its old location across Everett Mall Way to a new 7,660-square-foot (712 m^{2}) location in the mall's main parking lot in July 2014. The following year saw the opening of a new Buffalo Wild Wings location next to the Old Navy store on October 5.

In late 2006, Mervyn's announced that it would shutter all of its Oregon and Washington locations; it later declared bankruptcy and underwent liquidation in 2008 during the Great Recession. The Everett store was divided between LA Fitness and national discount family clothing chain Steve & Barry's, with the latter taking up the entire second floor as well as half of the first floor with the portion facing the mall. Steve & Barry's opened in June 2007, but it also declared bankruptcy and closed all locations just over a year later; its space remained vacant until Burlington Coat Factory took over, opening on September 20, 2013. Borders underwent liquidation in 2011, with its space subsequently taken over by a local bookstore. Steadfast defaulted in 2012 on a 10-year, $98 million loan for the mall which it took from the Royal Bank of Canada in 2007. Steadfast avoided foreclosure on the mall, having Canyon Partners, a Los Angeles–based investment group, join ownership over it the following year. The Canyon Partners investment allowed the mall to attract Burlington Coat Factory as well as Party City and Ulta Beauty.

Macy's closed its store at the Everett Mall in 2017 and was replaced by Floor & Decor the following year. In October 2017, Brixton Capital, an affiliate of Brutten Global, purchased the property for an undisclosed price from Steadfast Companies and Canyon Partners, with JLL taking over the mall's management and leasing; the sale did not include the then-former Macy's space nor the Village. Madison Marquette also expressed interest in buying the mall but determined that it was not a suitable site for long-term retail use. On August 31, 2019, it was announced that Sears would be closing their Everett location in December 2019. The Village saw Bed Bath & Beyond follow suit, with the latter announcing on September 18, 2020, that it would close its store in Everett at the end of the year; the vacated space was eventually reopened as a HomeGoods store in early 2023. The closures extended to the restaurants as well, with Famous Dave's closing its Everett location on June 1, 2022.

=== Redevelopment plan ===
A major redevelopment of the original mall was announced by Brixton Capital in August 2022, proposing demolition of the central portion and food court. An outdoor parking area would be added in their place, along with new shops that would result in a 20 percent reduction in overall space. The Sears store is also planned to be demolished and replaced with an At Home store. With the involvement of MG2 and Bayley Construction, the redevelopment commenced in early 2023, with Ulta Beauty agreeing to relocate in sharing space with At Home in the Sears space. In November 2023, Trader Joe's filed an application with the Washington State Liquor and Cannabis Board for a liquor license, indicating that it would move into the Sears space as well; its then-current location two blocks away was notorious among locals for its chronic limited parking availability during rush hour, with the mall location offering more parking space to alleviate the issue. Redevelopment fervor had spread to the mall's adjacent areas in the meantime, with Chick-fil-A opening a new restaurant along the west corner of the mall's boundary on December 7. Ulta Beauty moved in the Sears space at the end of February 2024, with Trader Joe's following on March 8.

In March 2024, Everett mayor Cassie Franklin revealed that the redeveloped mall would be renamed The Hub @ Everett upon completion and hinted at the possibility of a "top" entertainment anchor joining the mall, sparking rumors that it was Topgolf; she confirmed the latter the following month in a meeting with mall employees, with Brixton officially filing plans for a 68,000-square-foot (6,300 m^{2}) facility that would replace the Burlington/LA Fitness building in late July. However, the mall received another major blow in December when national media reported that Party City, which had filed for bankruptcy in January 2023, would close all of its stores by February 2025. As part of the company's bankruptcy proceedings that same month, discount retailer Five Below marked its entry into Washington state by taking over at least seven of its leases within the state, including the one at the mall; the new store opened on November 7 alongside the other locations, with a grand opening celebration held the following day.

During demolition of an exterior wall of the mall on January 16, 2025, a mobile crane collapsed onto the roof and injured two construction workers. The mall's interior closed on July 1, 2025. A permit filed by Brixton Capital in April 2026 included the addition of a self storage business and an alternate layout that replaced the Topgolf facility with an office building. A separate plan was submitted in May for an apartment building with 3,000 units and a clubhouse on the Topgolf site. Brixton Capital confirmed their plans to open a Topgolf location at the mall and stated the filing was an alternative configuration. The company also announced that Boot Barn and Shake Shack would open at the mall in late 2028.
