= Plop art =

Pejorative slang term for some art in public places

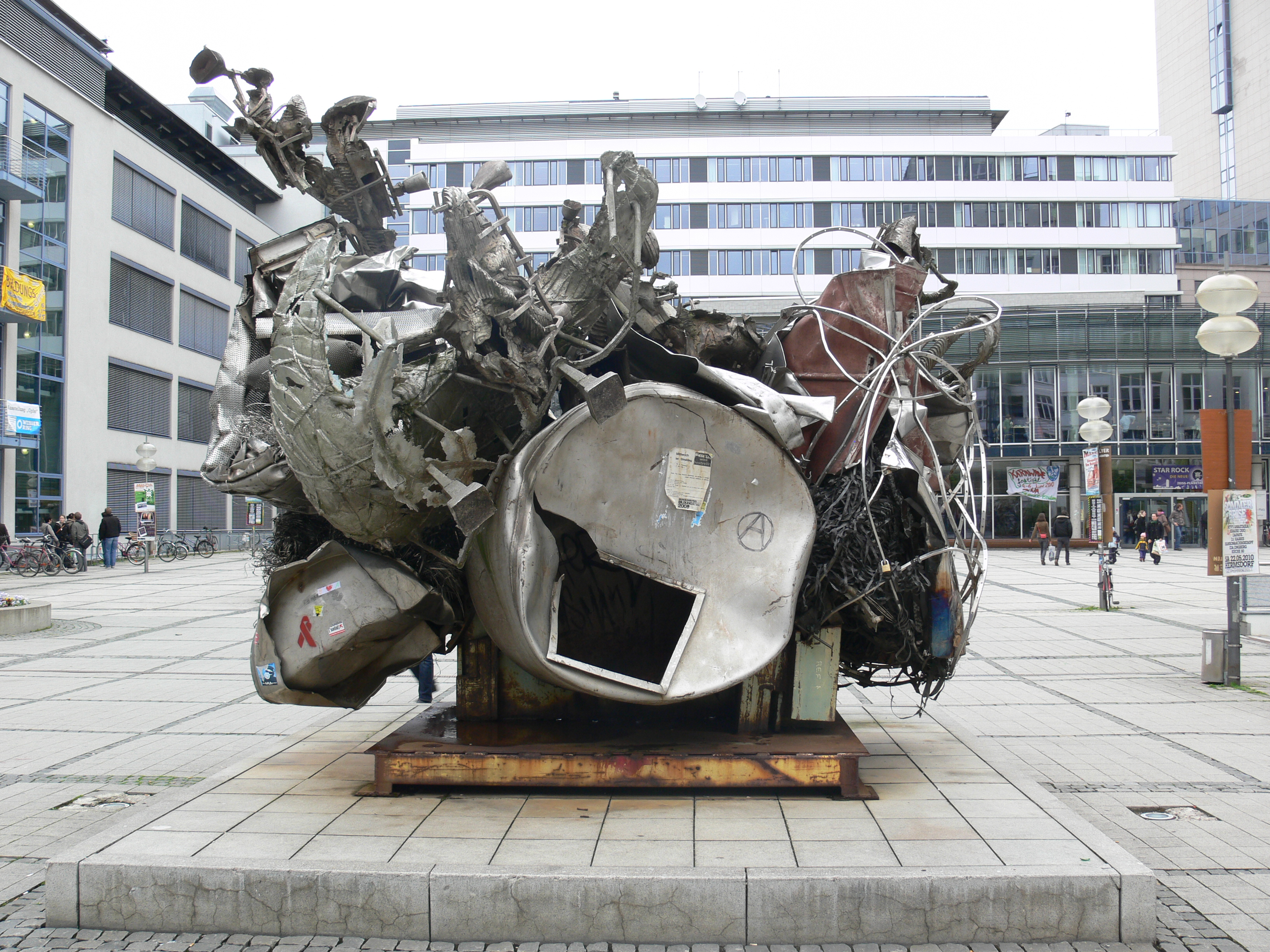
The "Newburgh" sculpture by Frank Stella in Jena is often discussed as bringing neither beauty nor visible meaning to the public space it is displayed in.

Plop art (or plonk art) is a pejorative slang term for public art (usually large, abstract, modernist or contemporary sculpture) made for government or corporate plazas, spaces in front of office buildings, skyscraper atriums, parks, and other public venues.

The term is a form of wordplay from the term pop art and connotes that the work is unattractive or inappropriate to its surroundings – that it has been thoughtlessly "plopped" where it lies. The term "plop" suggests the sound of something falling heavily and suddenly. It also holds connotations of excrement.

Some defenders of public art funding have tried to reappropriate the term. The book Plop: Recent Projects of the Public Art Fund celebrates the success of the Public Art Fund in financing many publicly placed works of art over the last few decades, many of which are now beloved, though they may at first have been derided as "ploppings".

== Origins ==
The term was coined by architect James Wines in a 1970 essay, Public Art–Private Art, published in Art in America. The term has been taken up by others, including British sculptor Rachel Whiteread and art historian Miwon Kwon.

"Right now architecture and sculpture are calling to each other, and calling for responses that's intelligent, not for more ghastly lumps of sculpture ... which have no sense of scale and are just plonked down in public places." — Anthony Caro (1924–2013), English sculptor.

== See also ==
- Environmental art
- Environmental sculpture
- James Wines
