= SITE =

American architecture firm

SITE (originally also known as Sculpture in the Environment) is an architecture and environmental design firm founded in 1970 by James Wines.

Located in the Wall Street area of New York City, the firm aims to unite building design with visual art, landscape, and green technology.

In the 1970s, SITE became internationally known for a series of highly unorthodox retail facilities for Best Products. While keeping the basic shape of a simple brick box, SITE gave the exteriors of the buildings an ironic postmodern twist, often suggesting cracks in the brickwork or deforming walls.

The severely distressed crumbling walls of the Indeterminate facade near Houston, Texas purportedly “appeared in more books on 20th century architecture than photographs of any other modern structure.”

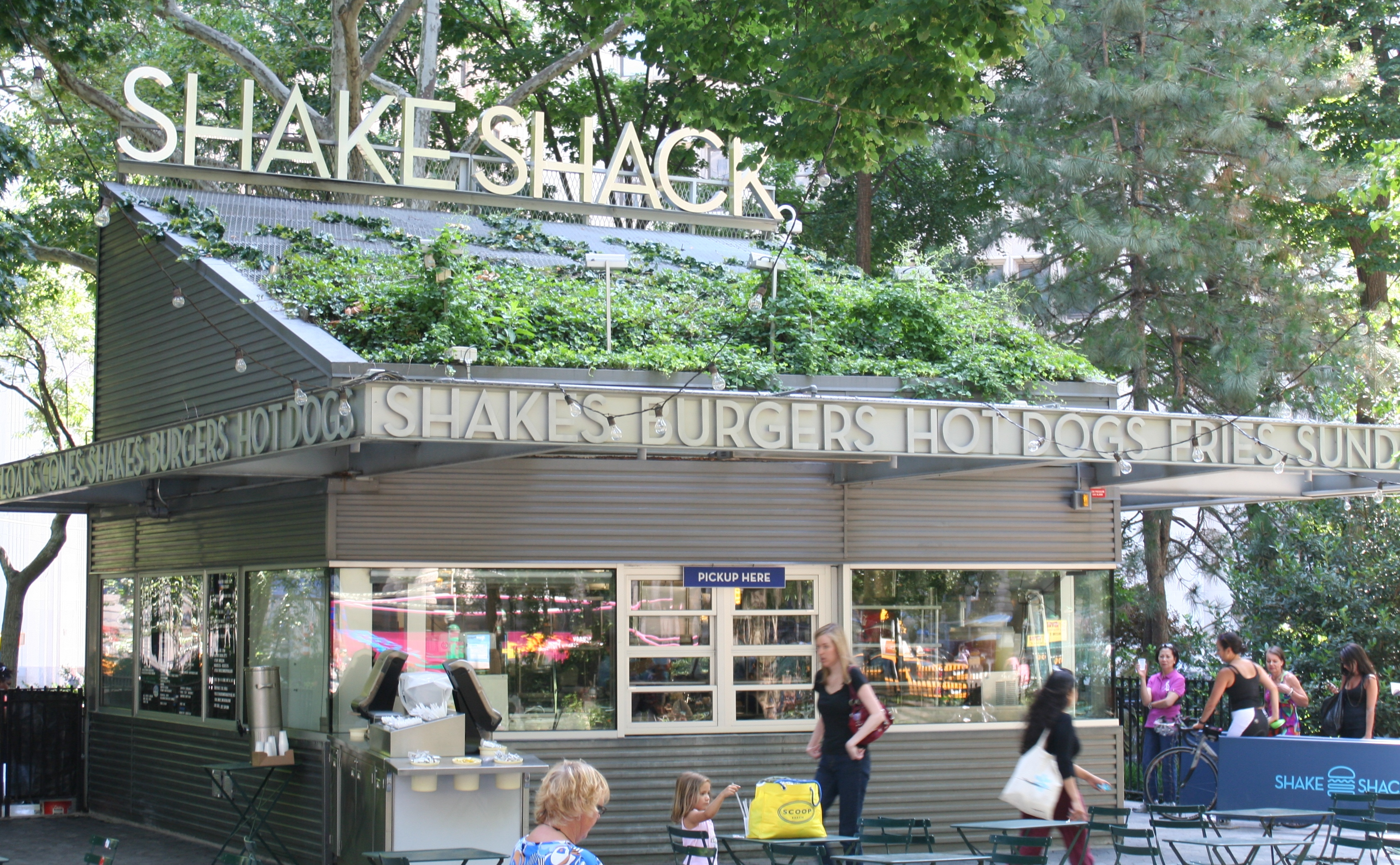
ShakeShack kiosk in Madison Square Park designed by SITE

Despite possibly representing "the apex of American Postmodernism," all the BEST facades except for the Forest Building disappeared or are now unrecognisably transformed.

== See also ==
- Environmental sculpture
- Plop art
