= Harold Roitenberg =

American businessman (1927–2018)

- Born: January 7, 1927
- Died: December 20, 2018 (age 91)
- Education: B.A. University of Minnesota
- Known for: Founder of Modern Merchandising Inc.
- Children: 5
- Parent(s): Sarah and Norman Roitenberg

Harold Roitenberg (January 7, 1927 – December 20, 2018) was an American businessman who founded the catalog, Modern Merchandising Inc., a merchandiser and showroom catalog.

== Early life and education ==
Roitenberg was born to a Jewish family, the son of Sarah and Norman Roitenberg. Roitenberg graduated with a B.A. in Journalism from the University of Minnesota.

== Career ==
After school, Roitenberg worked in the advertising department of Northwestern Auto Parts in Minneapolis and then went to work for his father-in-law who owned Minnesota Wholesalers which sold horse supplies. During his tenure, he expanded the company into a catalog showroom business that also sold small appliances, housewares, electronics, and jewelry.

Upon his father-in-law's death, Roitenberg ventured out on his own founding Creative Merchandising & Publishing in 1960. The company focused on producing catalogs for small businesses who wanted to develop a catalog presence but did not have the expertise, resources, and buying power to secure lower prices from manufacturers. Roitenberg's company allowed them to purchase collectively and secure lower prices. In 1961, he changed the name to Modern Merchandising Inc. In 1982, Modern Merchandising, then the 3rd largest catalog retailer, was acquired by Best Products in a stock transaction worth $109 million. The merger was accretive as Best Products' showrooms were mainly on the East Coast, Texas, and California while Modern Merchandising was mostly in the Midwest and the Northwest.

== Personal life ==
Roitenberg died on December 20, 2018, at the age of 91. He had five children: Steven Roitenberg, David Roitenberg, Sam Roitenberg, Jane Roitenberg Nolen, and Ursula Roitenber Galanos. All his sons predeceased him. Roitenberg was a victim of Bernard Madoff.
