= Jafco =

American chain of retail stores

Jafco Co.
- Cover of Jafco Catalog in 1974
- Company type: Private
- Industry: Catalog retail
- Founded: 1957
- Founder: Sidney Z. Jaffe
- Defunct: 1986
- Fate: Acquired by Best Products in 1982; all stores converted to Best by 1986
- Headquarters: Seattle, Washington
- Number of locations: 17
- Number of employees: 1000+

Jafco Co. was a multimillion-dollar chain of American catalog show room retail stores founded by Sidney Z. Jaffe in 1957. Headquartered in Seattle, Washington, the company sold a wide variety of items from stereo and photographic equipment to holiday gifts. Jafco sent catalogs to all of their clients allowing for pickup at their stores or by mail-order. Though retail locations stocked the more common items, Jafco's usual technique of processing orders started with customers ordering through mail and picking up at the store.

With notable locations in Downtown Seattle, Lynnwood, Southcenter, Bellevue, Northgate and Tacoma, the major retailer expanded until acquisition in the 1970s. Jafco was acquired by Modern Merchandising in 1972, then Best Products obtained all 17 stores in Washington and Oregon in 1982. By 1986 all the Jafco stores were converted to Best stores. In 1997, all of the Best stores in Washington state were closed down after financial troubles within the company. The Beaverton, Oregon location now hosts an Uwajimaya, another retail chain founded in Seattle.

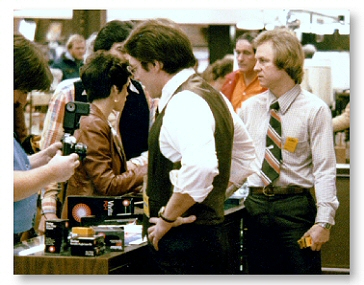
Salesmen working the photography section at Jafco Southcenter (Tukwila, Washington)

Illustration of a typical Jafco store (from catalog)

== Sidney Z. Jaffe ==
Sidney Z. Jaffe, born March 28, 1912, founded Jafco in 1957 with his wife and family in Seattle. After opening Jafco's first location near South Lake Union, Jaffe expanded into the catalog business with mail-ordering and processing right at their facilities. Throughout his ownership in the company, Sidney Z. Jaffe opened nearly twenty showrooms in Washington and Oregon. Jaffe's entire family helped manage the stores, with his wife Ruby and their sons Paul and Larry as well as his daughter Susan. In his spare time, he was a philanthropist, and donated generous amounts of money to many charities, synagogues and organizations around the Greater Seattle region. Sidney Jaffe died on May 25, 1979, at the age of 67.

The auditorium of Temple De Hirsch Sinai was renamed the Sidney Z. Jaffe Gold Room in 2001.

== Sources ==
- Department of Neighborhoods, Seattle (2014). "Seattle Historical Site – Jafco Westlake".
- Fitzgerald, Kenneth (August 16, 1975). "Jafco & Mac's Hi-Fi Square Off In Northwest". Billboard Magazine.
- "Forgotten Shopping". History's Dumpster. N/A. 10 January 2013.
- Humphrey, Clark (2006). Vanishing Seattle. Charleston SC, Chicago IL, Portsmouth NH, San Francisco CA: Arcadia Publishing. p. 23. ISBN 978-0738548692.
- Lane, Polly (1991). "Best Products Is Paring Down – Southcenter Store To Stay Open, While Others Shut Their Doors".
