= Best Products =

American catalog showroom retail chain

Best Products Company, Inc.
- Type: Public (NASDAQ: BESTQ)
- Industry: Retail (Catalog merchant showroom)
- Founded: 1957; 69 years ago
- Founder: Sydney Lewis; Frances Lewis
- Defunct: February 9, 1997; 29 years ago (last stores closed) December 1998; 27 years ago (liquidation completed)
- Fate: Chapter 11 bankruptcy liquidation
- Headquarters: Richmond, Virginia
- Products: Home furnishings, consumer electronics, jewelry, housewares, toys
- Subsidiaries: Ashby's, Basco, Dolgin's, Great Western, Jafco, Labelle's, Miller Sales, Modern Merchandising, Rogers

Best Products Company, Inc., or simply Best, was a chain of American catalog showroom retail stores founded by Sydney and Frances Lewis in 1957 and formerly headquartered in Richmond, Virginia. The company was in existence for four decades, until 1998. In 1996, the company operated 169 Best stores and 11 Best Jewelry stores in 23 states, as well as a nationwide mail-order service. Best Products was traded on the NASDAQ exchange as "BESTQ".

== History ==
The company was founded by Sydney Lewis and Frances Lewis. Sydney Lewis, a lawyer educated at Washington and Lee University and Harvard Business School, worked with his father managing an encyclopedia sales operation in Richmond. Lewis thought of selling additional merchandise along with the bills for encyclopedias. In 1957, the Lewises sent out their first catalog. The first showroom was at 4909 West Marshall Street in Richmond, just across the street from the new Willow Lawn Shopping Center.

The company had a strong sense of promotion and artistic sensibilities; it was legend in artistic circles that it would trade store merchandise for art. As a result, the company, as well as the Lewises, gathered a significant collection of 20th-century art. Much of the Lewis Collection can be seen at the Virginia Museum of Fine Arts, and a café named after the company opened in that museum in 2010.

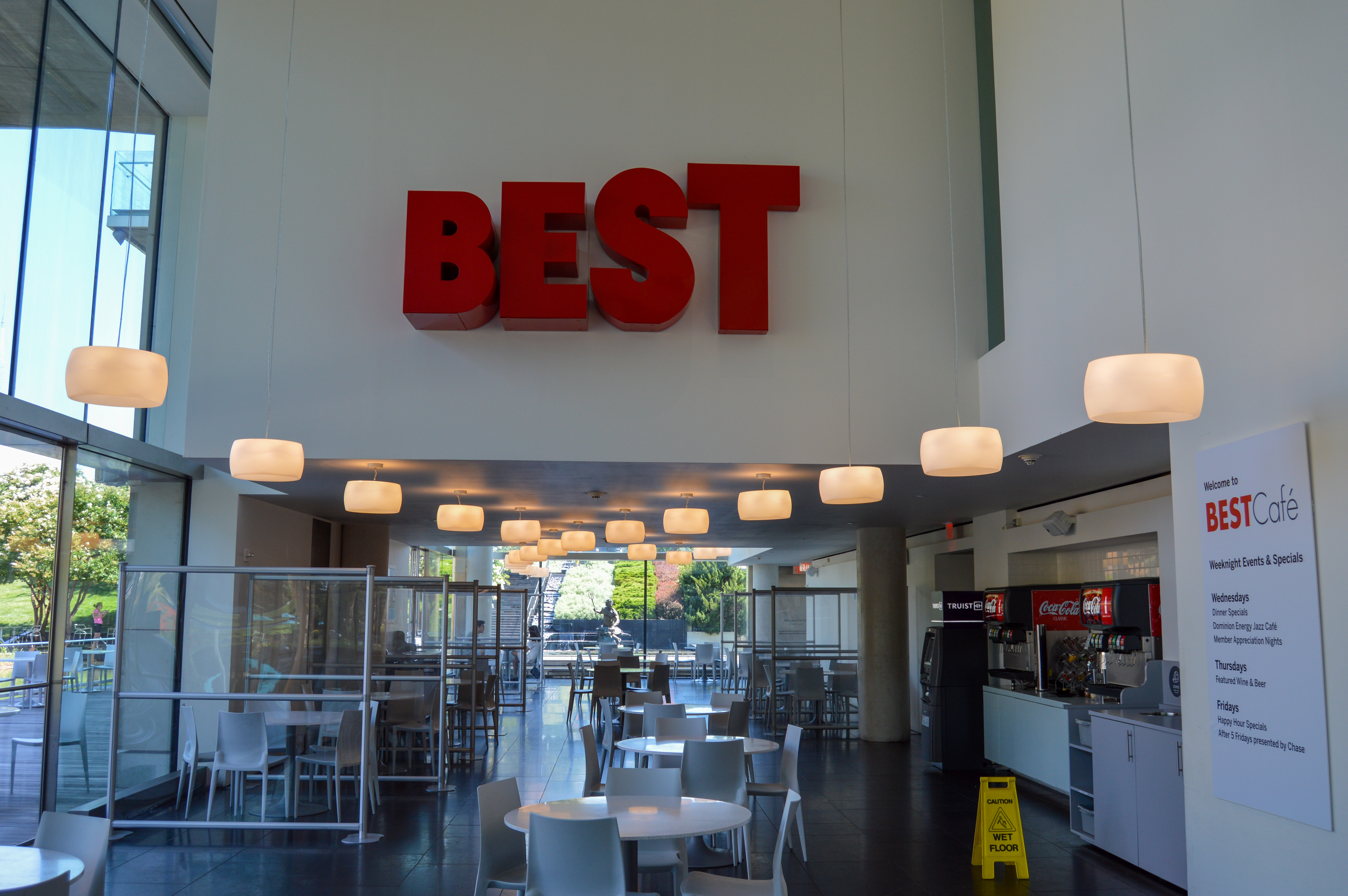
Best Café at the Virginia Museum of Fine Arts in Richmond, Virginia

=== Sculpture in the Environment ===
In the 1970s, Best Products contracted with James Wines' "Sculpture in the Environment" (SITE) architecture firm to design nine highly unorthodox retail facilities, notably a tongue-in-cheek structure called the "Indeterminate Facade" in Houston, Texas with a severely distressed facade. This building purportedly "appeared in more books on 20th-century architecture than photographs of any other modern structure". In Richmond, the company built the Peeling Wall showroom that appeared to have a peeling facade (located on Midlothian Turnpike) as well as the Forest Showroom that appeared to have trees growing out of it (located at 9008 Quioccasin Road). The store in Sacramento also had a unique design; in the morning, a jagged corner of the building's brick facade would slide away to reveal the store entrance, and then would slide back shut at night. The structure, with its breakaway entry removed, is now a Best Buy. Photographs of these storefronts appeared in several Best catalogs. One anchored the Eudowood Plaza in Towson, Maryland, featuring a tilted front. As of 2007, most of these distinctive buildings have been converted into conventional buildings by removing the architectural embellishments, or in a few cases, demolished. The only building to retain its distinctive features is the Forest Building in Richmond, now home to the West End Presbyterian Church, which has stated that the forest in the entryway has been an asset to the church's environment.

Their Parham Road headquarters, built in 1981 and designed by Hardy Holzman Pfeiffer, was notable for an American Institute of Architects award and the use of Art Deco eagles rescued from a New York building. The giant BEST letters of the headquarters could be seen along Interstate 95 at Parham Road. Hardy Holzman Pfeiffer subsequently designed the West Wing of the Virginia Museum, which was funded by the Lewises.

=== Retail concept ===
Best employed the "catalog showroom" concept for many of its product offerings. Although some product categories (such as sporting goods and toys) were stocked in traditional self-serve aisles, the majority of products (notably consumer electronics, housewares, and appliances) were featured as unboxed display models. Customers were permitted to examine and experiment with these models, and if found to be desirable, they could be purchased by submitting orders to store personnel. Saleable versions of the merchandise (usually boxed and/or in its original packaging) would then be retrieved from storage and delivered to a customer service area for subsequent purchase.

=== Acquisitions ===
As a cost-saving measure, Best jointly published its catalog with Service Merchandise (founded by Harry Zimmerman) and Modern Merchandising (founded by Harold Roitenberg), and had regional non-compete agreements with those chains.

In 1982, Best acquired catalog competitors: Basco, a chain with 19 catalog showrooms in the Northeast and Ohio; and Modern Merchandising, headquartered in Minnetonka, Minnesota, with 76 showrooms under the names LaBelle's, Dolgin's, Jafco, Miller Sales, Rogers and Great Western. This was followed by the acquisition of Ashby's, a 9-store women's clothing chain, and the opening of four Best Jewelry stores in the Washington D.C. metro area.

=== Bankruptcy ===
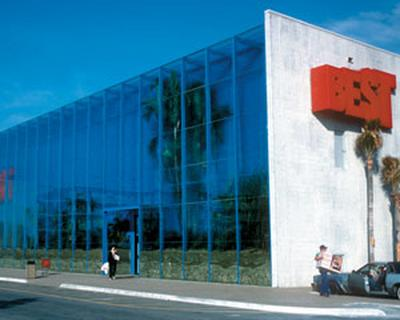
Terrarium facade of Hialeah, Florida, showroom. The location is now an Office Depot.

Best filed twice for Chapter 11 bankruptcy protection. The first bankruptcy period began in January 1991 and lasted through June 16, 1994. The second and final filing was made in September 1996. At the time of the second filing, Best operated 169 Best stores and 11 Best Jewelry stores in 23 states, and a nationwide mail-order service.

Best Products was traded on the NASDAQ exchange as "BESTQ". It was delisted on November 29, 1996. The last Best stores closed on February 9, 1997. By May 1997, Best had liquidated most of its assets and was declared insolvent. Best vacated its corporate headquarters in Richmond in January 1998 and mailed out final checks to unsecured creditors the following December (paying 96 cents per dollar owed).
