= List of Saint Peter's University people =

This is a list of notable graduates of Saint Peter's University (formerly Saint Peter's College) in Jersey City, New Jersey.

== Notable alumni ==
=== Academics ===
- Jack Bogdanski, professor of law at Lewis & Clark Law School
- George J. Borjas, Robert W. Scrivner Professor of Economics and Social Policy at the Harvard Kennedy School

=== Arts & entertainment ===
- Will Durant, 1968 Pulitzer Prize for General Nonfiction and the 1977 Presidential Medal of Freedom recipient
- Blaise Ffrench, actor, entrepreneur
- Ken Jennings, 1979 Drama Desk Award for Outstanding Featured Actor in a Musical recipient
- George Khoury, notable writer and interviewer in the field of comic books
- Francis M. Nevins, 1975 and 1989 Edgar Award-winning mystery writer, biographer, film historian and law professor
- Renee Sebastian, Filipino-American soul-infused pop and R&B singer and songwriter

=== Business ===
- Lawrence R. Codey, former President & COO of Public Service Electric & Gas Company
- Frank D'Amelio, Chief Financial Officer, Pfizer
- Joseph R. Ettore, retail executive, former CEO of Ames, Jamesway, and Stuarts
- Joseph R. Gromek, President & CEO of The Warnaco Group and former President & CEO of Brooks Brothers
- James J. Loughlin, former National Director of the Pharmaceuticals Practice at KPMG
- William J. Marino, President & CEO, Horizon Blue Cross and Blue Shield of New Jersey.
- James Meister, former President & CEO of Kings Super Markets

=== Government ===
- Joseph Doria, former Mayor of Bayonne, New Jersey and former New Jersey Department of Community Affairs
- Charles M. Egan, New Jersey State Assemblyman, Senator, and Vice-Chancellor of the Chancery Court
- James J. Galdieri, former New Jersey State Assemblyman
- Daniel J. Griffin, former U.S. Representative from New York
- James A. Hamill, former United States Representative for New Jersey's 12th congressional district and New Jersey's 10th congressional district
- Edward J. Hart, former United States Representative for New Jersey's 14th congressional district
- John V. Kelly, nine-term member of the New Jersey General Assembly and former Mayor of Nutley, New Jersey
- Mary Madison, member of the Iowa House of Representatives
- Mark McNulty, former Delaware Secretary of Transportation, who served in cabinet of Governor Dale E. Wolf
- Bob Menendez, current United States Senator from New Jersey
- Robert J. Morris, Anti-communist activist and chief counsel to the United States Senate Subcommittee on Internal Security from 1951 to 1953; former President of the University of Dallas
- Charles F. X. O'Brien, former United States Representative for New Jersey's 12th congressional district from 1921 to 1925
- Edward T. O'Connor Jr., New Jersey State Senator
- Joan M. Quigley, New Jersey General Assemblywoman
- John P. Sheridan Jr., former New Jersey Commissioner of Transportation and current President and CEO of Cooper University Hospital.
- Albio Sires, United States Representative for New Jersey's 13th congressional district; former New Jersey Assemblyman and Mayor of West New York, New Jersey
- Thomas F. X. Smith, 38th Mayor of Jersey City, New Jersey
- Anthony R. Suarez, Mayor of Ridgefield, New Jersey
- Joseph Patrick Tumulty, Chief of Staff to President Woodrow Wilson
- Larry Wainstein, politician who was elected to represent the 33rd Legislative District in the New Jersey General Assembly in 2025

=== Law ===
- Thomas Francis Meaney, former Judge on the United States District Court for the District of New Jersey
- Peter G. Sheridan, Judge on the United States District Court for the District of New Jersey
- Reginald Stanton '56, former Judge of the New Jersey Superior Court; Saint Peter's first and only Rhodes Scholar
- Chester J. Straub, Senior Circuit Judge of the United States Court of Appeals for the Second Circuit

=== Journalism ===
- John Henning, award-winning TV and radio news reporter in Boston, Massachusetts
- Thomas O'Toole, award-winning reporter for The Washington Post and other newspapers

=== Science and medicine ===
- Nicholas J. Cifarelli, physician known for starting the first Bioethics Advisory Committee in the United States
- Robert G. Lahita, ’67, chairman of medicine, St. Joseph's Healthcare System
- Joseph McGinn, pioneer of minimally invasive cardiac bypass surgery; medical director of the Heart Institute of Staten Island

=== Sports ===
- Frank Brooks, former MLB relief pitcher
- Bernard Cicirelli, 1st St. Peter's College basketball All-American 1954, inaugural inductee in college's Athletic Hall of Fame 1981, and 2013 inductee into the MAAC Honor Roll Exhibition at Naismith Memorial Basketball Hall of Fame
- Keydren Clark, Two-time NCAA basketball scoring champion and seventh all-time leading scorer in NCAA history.
- Doug Edert, breakout star of the Peacocks' 2022 NCAA tournament run (transferred to Bryant University after that season)
- Bill Foxen, former MLB pitcher
- Rodney Hawkins, ABA basketball player
- Bob Hurley, Naismith Memorial Basketball Hall of Fame basketball coach at St. Anthony High School in Jersey City, New Jersey
- KC Ndefo, another key player in the Peacocks' 2022 NCAA tournament run (transferred to Seton Hall University after that season)
- Víctor Santos, former MLB relief pitcher
- Murphy Wiredu, professional soccer player
