= NWL =

NWL may refer to:

== Businesses ==
- National Wholesale Liquidators, an American closeout discount store operator
- Northumbrian Water Ltd., a utility in England
- Newell Brands, an American maker of household, outdoor and stationery products

== Computing ==
- NetWare Lite, discontinued networking software

== Music ==
- NWL (album), a 2015 pop album by American singer MAX
- Neverending White Lights, a 2005–2011 collab by Canadian Daniel Victor

== Sport and games ==
- NASPA Word List, a Scrabble lexicon
- Northwest League, in Minor League Baseball
- Northwoods League, a collegiate summer baseball league
