= Charles Egan =

Charles Egan may refer to:

- Charles Egan (1911/12–1993), owner of the Charles Egan Gallery
- Charles M. Egan (1877–1955), American attorney and Democratic party politician
- Charlie Egan (born 1959), former Australian international football (soccer) player
