= Park Square, Rhode Island =

Area in Rhode Island, U.S.

Coordinates: 41.9833°N 71.5157°W

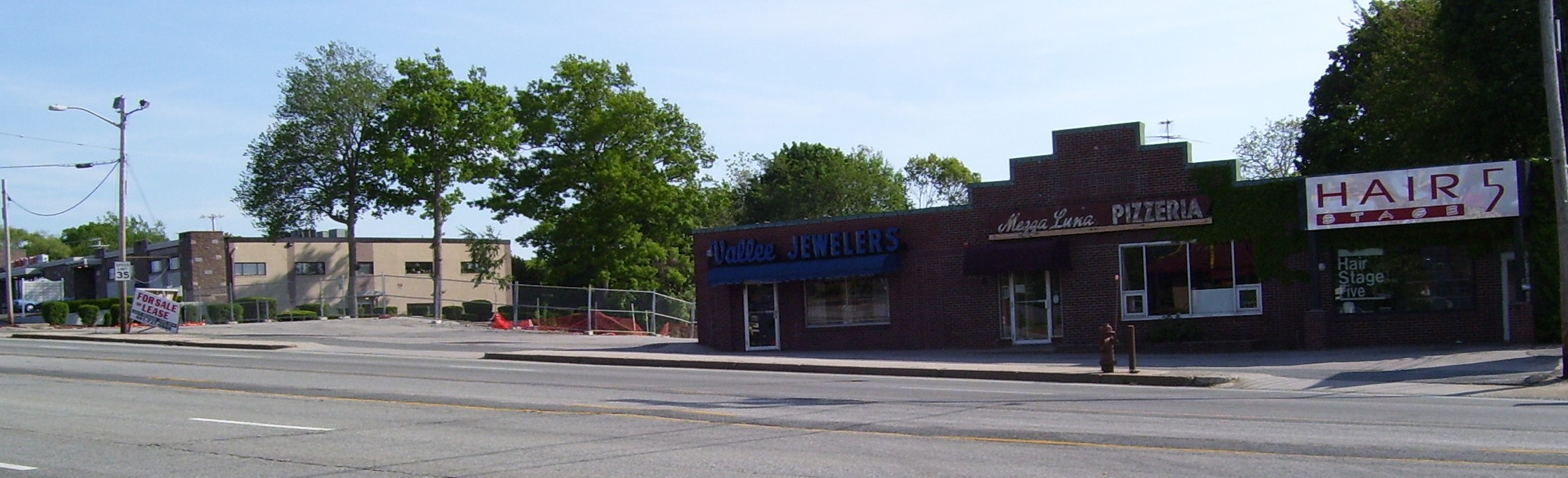
Stores in Park Square North Smithfield in 2008

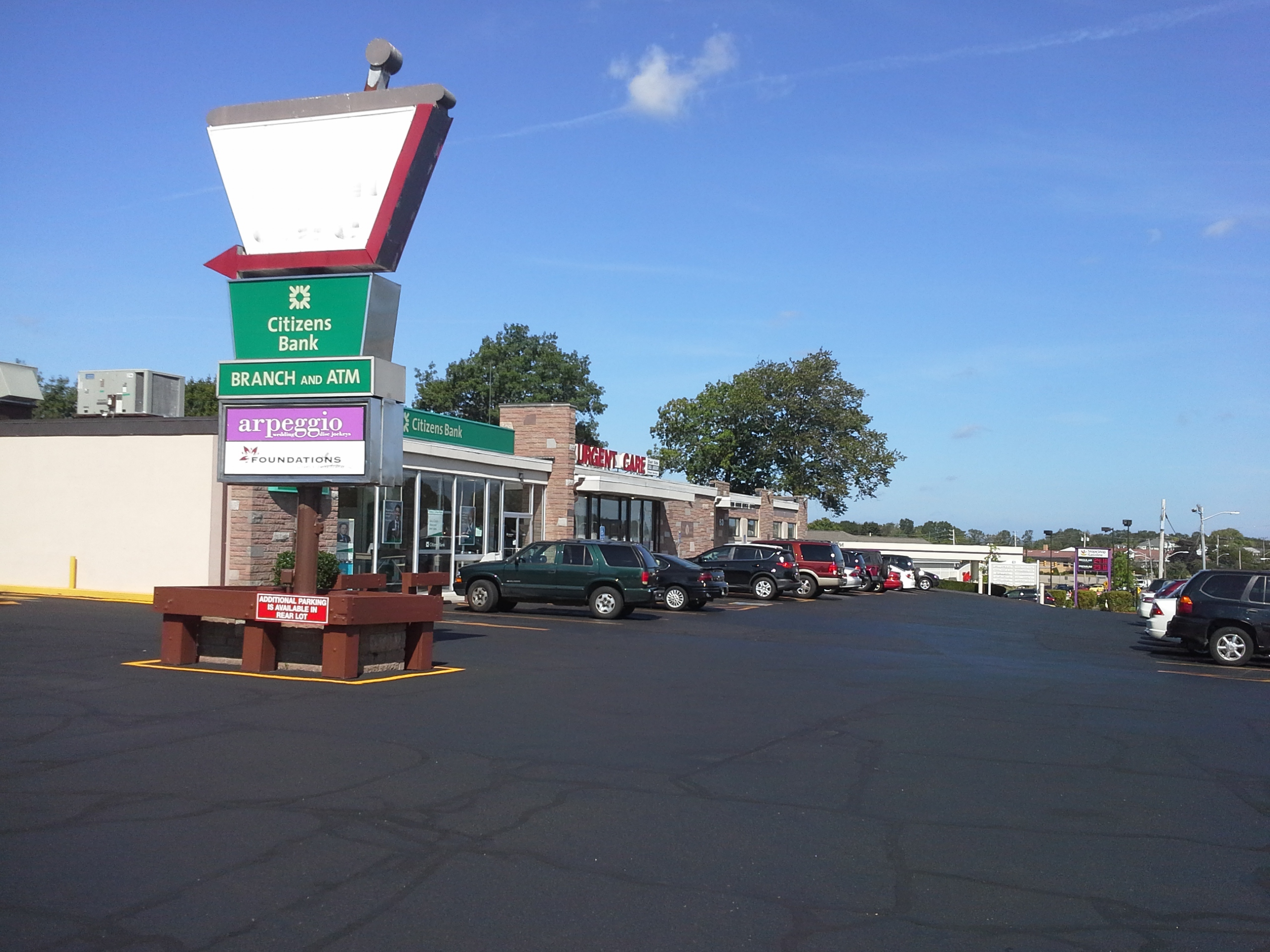
The Plaza at Park Square in North Smithfield, Rhode Island, US, with old Pharmacy sign, featuring a mortar and pestle

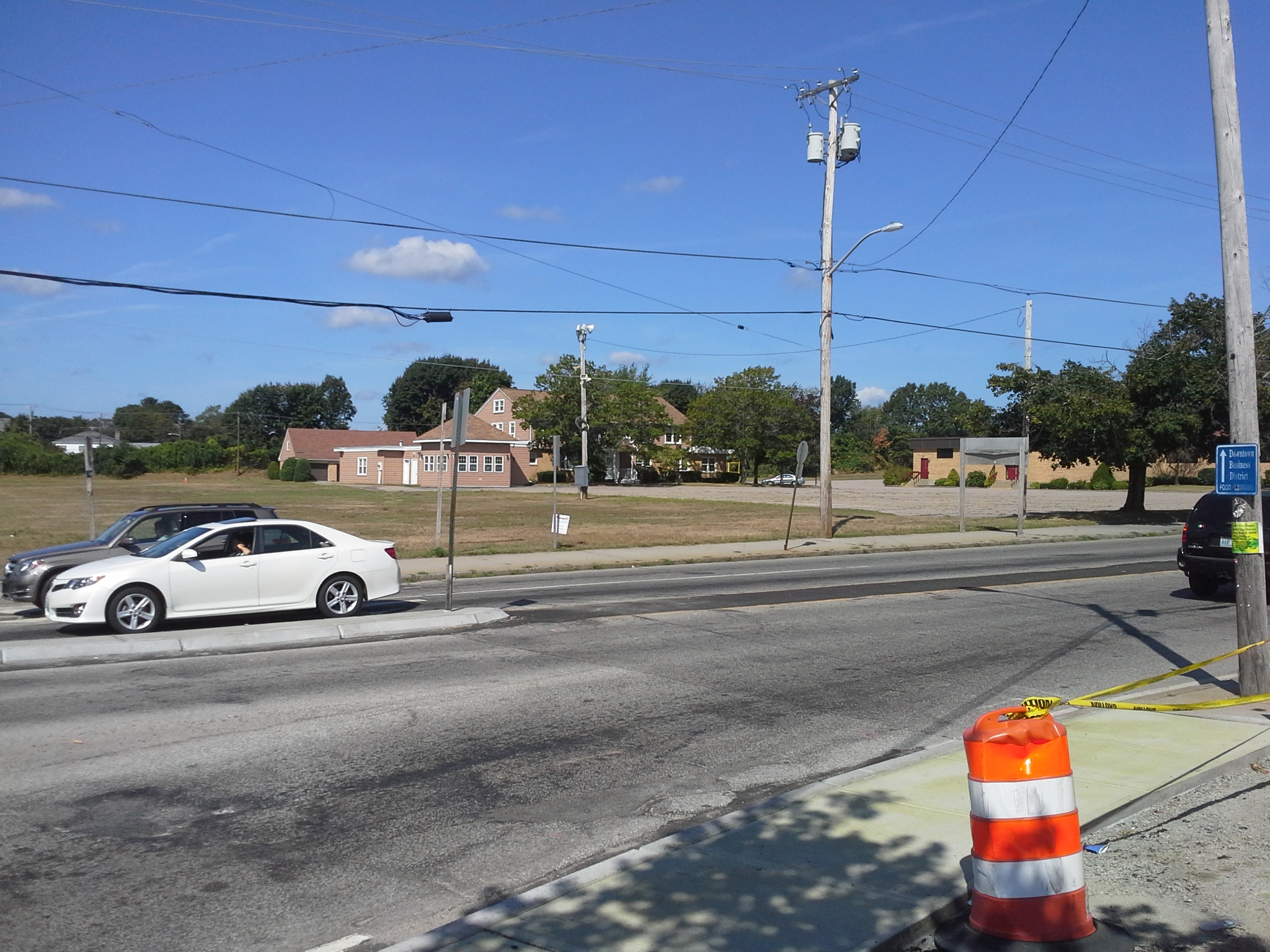
Holy Trinity Catholic Church Field (formerly Lady Queen of Martyrs Field) in Park Square on Park Avenue in Woonsocket Rhode Island, features an annual carnival.

Park Square is an area on Rhode Island Route 146A in North Smithfield and Woonsocket, Rhode Island, near the intersection of Park Avenue and Route 146A. It is 12 miles from Providence and near Union Village.

== History ==
By 1706 the area which is now Park Square contained the old Smithfield Meeting House, a Six Principle Baptist Church, which was built in a lot called the "Orchard," "just south of the old Rock Cliff farm." It was deeded to the Smithfield Baptists by Jonathan Sprague in 1738 and then torn down in 1749 to use the timbers in constructing the Elder Ballou Meeting House in Cumberland. In the early twentieth century, Park Square was the site of Oak Knoll Farm, a large ice cream business which had been expanded by Charles Metcalf Smith. At that time, the Park Square area contained a diner, a gas station, an amusement park in North Smithfield, and in Woonsocket, a trolley barn and fairground, where an annual fair was founded in the 1860s by the Woonsocket Agricultural and Horticultural Society. A carnival is still held yearly in the area at a field owned by the Church of Lady Queen of Martyrs, and the Woonsocket High School football team plays on nearby Barry Field. The historic Frank Wilbur House is located near Park Square.

== Businesses ==
Park Square is currently home to many businesses, including Citizen's Bank (previously an Oldstone Bank), Park Square Urgent Care (previously a pharmacy and lunch counter), Park Square Florist, Park Square Wine & Spirits, Burger King, Wendy's, McDonald's (previously the site of Square One and Howard Johnson's), Pearl's Candy & Nuts, Ocean State Job Lot (previously Almac's until 1995), Super Stop & Shop (previously the site of a Mammoth Mart (later Mars until 1990), Star Market, and Kentucky Beef (later Burger Chef). Rehabilitation Hospital of Rhode Island (built in 1965 as Fogarty Hospital and named after Congressman John E. Fogarty) is also located in the Square.

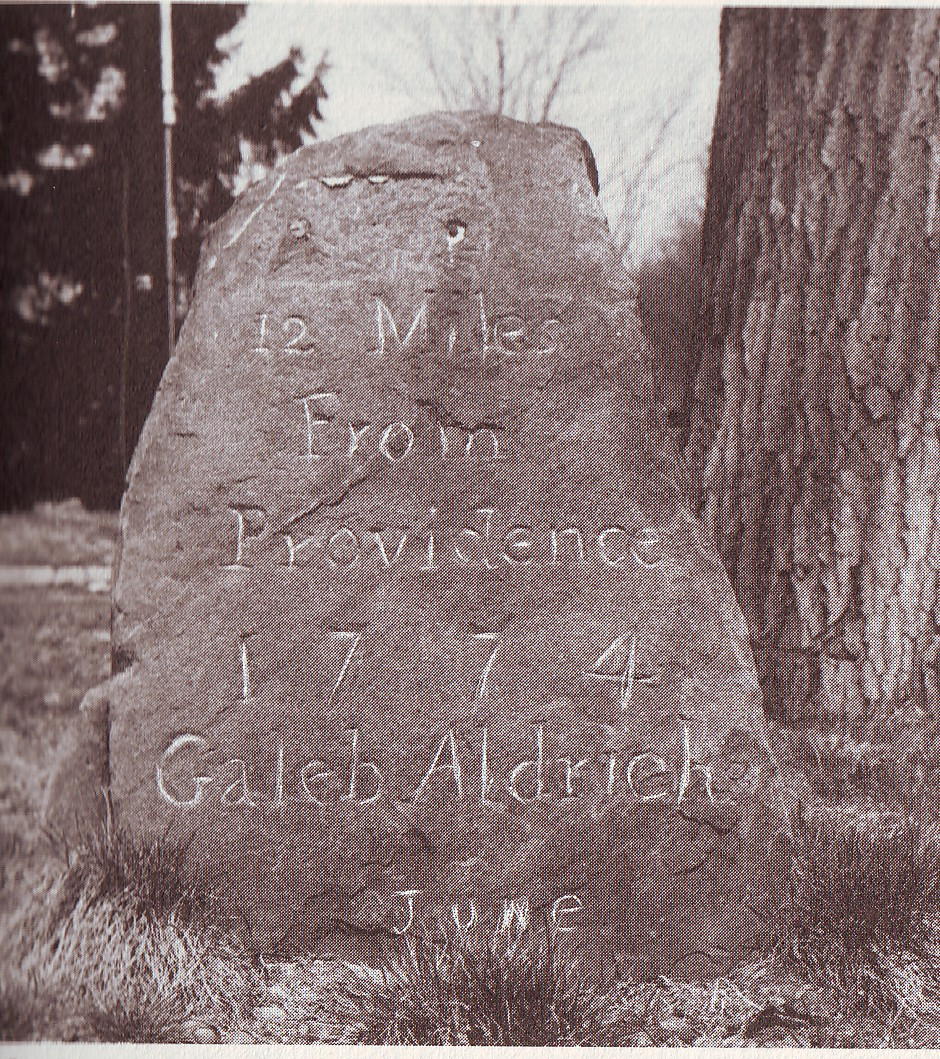
1774 Caleb Aldrich milestone on Rt. 146A near Landmark Hospital

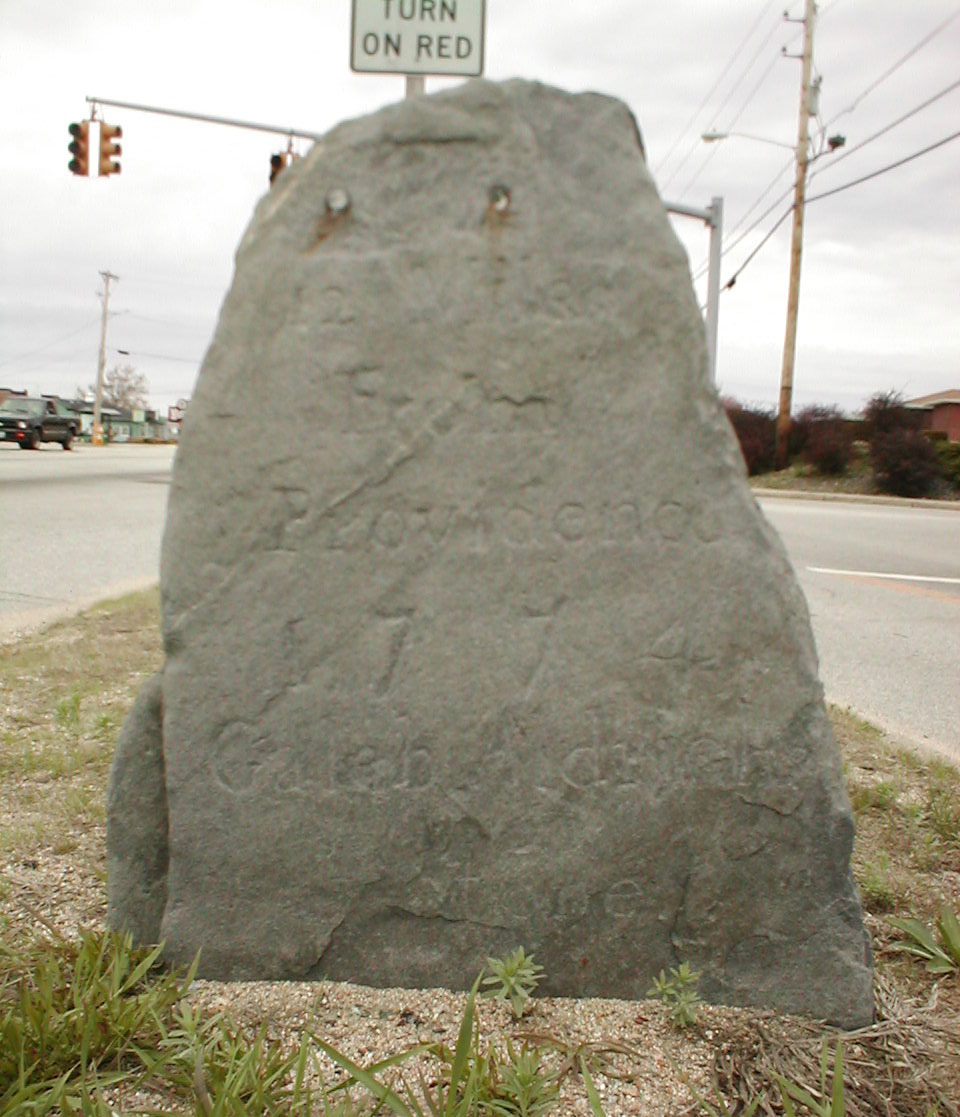
2002 photo of the 1774 milestone
