= Rich's (discount store) =

Rich's Department Stores
- Type: Discount Department Store
- Industry: Retail
- Founded: 1962
- Defunct: 1997
- Fate: Liquidated
- Headquarters: Salem, Massachusetts
- Products: Clothing, footwear, bedding, furniture, jewelry, beauty products, electronics and housewares.
- Website: None

Rich's was a family-owned business that was established in 1962. It grew out of Jerry's Army Navy Surplus in Salem, Massachusetts. The Rich family once operated 29 discount merchandise stores in Maine, New Hampshire, Vermont, and Massachusetts.

== History ==
Jerry Rich, a Russian immigrant living in Salem, Massachusetts, established Jerry's Army-Navy Surplus in 1929. Rich's was founded in 1961 by Rich, his sons Bennett and Howard and his son-in-law Joel Saxe. Similar to chain stores like Ames and Bradlee's, the chain offered discounted brand-name merchandise. In 1994, the company had sales of $240 million (~$472 million in 2025). By Jerry Rich's death in 1995, the chain had 28 locations across New England.

=== Bankruptcy and closure ===
Due to retail consolidation and pressure from Walmart, the chain went bankrupt on March 14, 1996. Financial records in its bankruptcy filing detailed $63.4 million in assets and $51.3 million in liabilities. Although the business was initially optimistic about its ability to emerge from bankruptcy, the store shuttered all its locations in December 1996. Nearly 2,000 workers at the company's 28 stores in Massachusetts, Maine, New Hampshire, and Vermont lost their jobs by February 1997.
