= Jamesway =

Former discount department store chain

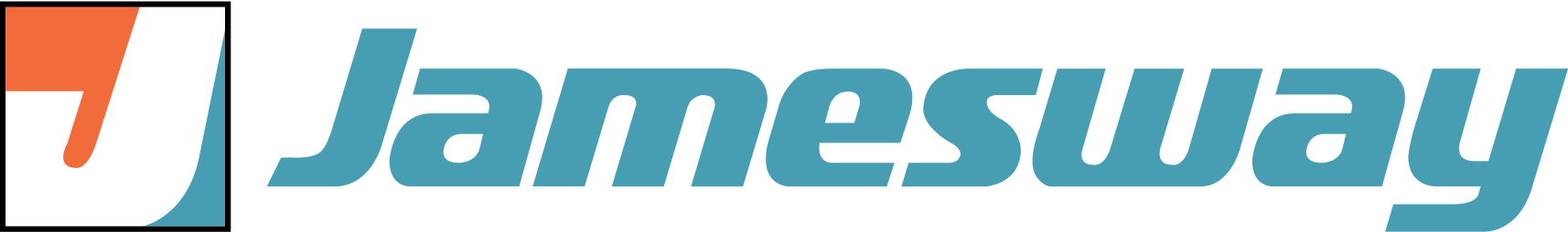
- Type: Department store
- Industry: Retail
- Founded: 1961; 65 years ago Jamestown, New York, U.S.
- Founder: Herbert Fisher
- Defunct: December 1995; 30 years ago
- Fate: Bankruptcy; some former locations converted to Ames
- Headquarters: Secaucus, New Jersey, U.S.
- Number of locations: 138 (1991)
- Products: Clothing, footwear, bedding, furniture, jewelry, beauty products, toys, electronics and housewares
- Number of employees: 7,400 (1993)

Jamesway Corporation, more commonly known as Jamesway, was a chain of discount department stores based in Secaucus, New Jersey. It was founded in 1961 with a single store in Jamestown, New York, ultimately growing into a chain that, at its peak, operated 138 stores throughout the Northeast and mid-Atlantic regions.

Despite its successes, Jamesway faced significant losses during its last years in business. This resulted in two bankruptcy filings, which ultimately put an end to the chain in 1995.

== History ==
Jamesway began in 1961 with its first store by Herbert Fisher. The company got its name from the town in which the first store was located, Jamestown, New York. At its peak in 1991, the company operated 138 stores throughout the mid-Atlantic region of the United States and employed nearly 6,000. The company had locations in New York, New Jersey, Pennsylvania, Maryland, Ohio, Virginia, Delaware, and other states. Jamesway's headquarters was in Secaucus, New Jersey. It expanded much in the 1960s, and continued to grow until the 1980s. During this period, it acquired many properties from then-defunct discount stores such as Two Guys, Woolco, King's, and one from Mays. They also acquired the Westons chain of discount stores in the late 1970s. The original store in Jamestown relocated to Chautauqua Mall in the late 1980s.

Jamesway #20, located in Monroe, New York, was destroyed by a major fire on April 29, 1990.

=== Bankruptcy ===
Peter Hollis, former president and CEO of Ames, joined Jamesway in 1991 and was named president in February of that year. In April 1991, in an effort to strengthen its financial position, the company secured a $40 million (~$81.9 million in 2024) refinancing agreement and closed 11 unprofitable stores.

In December 1992, Jamesway closed 13 stores.

In January 1993, Jamesway rolled out a new store format and planned to completely remodel the 127-store chain within the following three years. The remodel would include completely redoing 30 stores. The remodeling efforts included better lighting, store layouts, and signage improvements throughout the store. In June 1993, Joseph Ettore returned to Jamesway after a spell working for Stuart’s, having earlier been with the company during its 1980s. On July 19, 1993 the company filed Chapter 11 bankruptcy protection. Before the filing, the chain had sales of $1.05 billion and 7,400 employees. In August 1993, the discounter said it cut 70 headquarters jobs and implemented a management realignment. "We want to stay in business," Ettore emphasized. In December 1993, Jamesway announced it would close 14 stores and remodel 11 stores as part of a plan to pull the company out of bankruptcy. The chain emerged from bankruptcy in January 1995 with 90 stores remaining. The company put itself up for sale in May 1995. Ames was viewed as the most likely suitor for the chain, although Hills and Caldor were also considered. At the time it put itself up for sale, the company had 5,900 employees. Jamesway filed for Chapter 11 bankruptcy for the second time in October 1995 after it had emerged from its nearly two-year-long bankruptcy. Just days before its filing, the company laid off 3% of its workforce. The company decided it would close all of its remaining stores, and liquidation sales began immediately, running from October to December 1995.

It was believed that its continued weak sales, along with operating losses and constricted trade credit, contributed to its bankruptcy. During that time, Wal-Mart had begun to open new stores in the same areas as Jamesway stores, making Jamesway's fate inescapable. Ames purchased 11 former Jamesway stores and reopened them as Ames stores, but Ames would end up meeting the same fate as Jamesway, declaring bankruptcy in 2001 and then closing all of its stores in 2002.
