= Park Square =

Park Square may refer to:

- Park Square, Sheffield, England
- Park Square, Leeds, England
- Park Square, London, England
- Park Square, Rhode Island, United States
- Park Square (Boston), Massachusetts, United States

== See also ==
- Park Square Mall, Bangalore, India
- Park Square Historic District (Franklinville, New York)
- River Park Square, mall in Spokane, Washington, United States
- Bay Park Square, mall in Green Bay, Wisconsin, United States
