= Herbert Fisher (businessman) =

American businessman (c. 1922–1993)

- Born: c. 1922; New York City
- Died: April 3, 1993 (age 71); Oradell, New Jersey
- Known for: Founder of discount retailer Jamesway
- Spouse: Florence Temkin
- Children: 3

Herbert Fisher (c. 1922 – April 3, 1993) was an American businessman and the founder of discount retailer Jamesway.

== Biography ==
Fisher was born to a Jewish family in New York City and raised in Borough Park, Brooklyn. He is a graduate of Townsend Harris High School and attended City College for two years before serving in the Army Air Force during World War II. After the war, he worked as a merchandise packer at $12 a week. In 1960, he opened the first Jamesway stores in Jamestown, New York hence the name Jamesway. Jamesway was a discount retailer which focused on high volumes at low prices. In 1967, he took the company public. He grew the business to 108 stores and 5,000 employees mainly in New York, New Jersey, and Pennsylvania. In 1977, he retired from his position as CEO and president but remained as chairman until his death.

He served on the board of governors of the Hackensack Hospital, was national vice president of the Muscular Dystrophy Association, and was elected to the Discounting Hall of Fame.

== Personal life ==
In 1950, he married Florence Temkin; they had three daughters, Meredith Fisher Gitler, Judith Fisher Furer, and Lesley Fisher Greenblatt. Fisher died of colon cancer at his home in Oradell, New Jersey. His wife died in 2015.
