= Mammoth Mart =

American discount department store chain

- Formerly: Mammoth Mills
- Type: Discount store
- Industry: Retail
- Founded: 1956
- Founder: Max Coffman and Henry Gornstein
- Defunct: 1979
- Fate: Bankruptcy & bought by King's discount stores
- Successor: King's (defunct discount store)
- Headquarters: Framingham, Massachusetts Incorporated = Maine
- Number of locations: 35 stores (1969)
- Area served: New England among other states in the North East
- Products: Clothing, footwear, bedding, furniture, jewelry, beauty products, electronics, toys and housewares.
- Owner: King's discount stores
- Website: None

Mammoth Mart was a discount department store chain, located in the northeastern United States, primarily in the New England area. The chain was founded by Max Coffman and Henry Gornstein in Framingham, Massachusetts in 1956, and was something of a prototype for the large, downscale department store, selling housewares, hardware and clothing in stark, unfussy buildings, usually in suburban shopping center locations. Other discount department store retailers like K-Mart, Zayre, and Bradlees would subsequently expand on this concept.

Their advertising mascot was Marty the elephant, a smiling, blazer-wearing mammoth.

== History ==
In 1956, Max Coffman and Henry Gornstein opened the first Mammoth Mart (at the time known as Mammoth Mills) in Framingham, MA. It was originally called Mammoth Mills due to the first store being in a mill building that used the same name. The name was changed to Mammoth Mart in 1962.

By 1969, the chain had 35 stores. In March 1970, Mammoth Mart diversified their holdings by acquiring the eight-unit Boston Baby chain of juvenile merchandise stores, eventually expanding the division to fifteen stores. This venture was a failure, and the chain liquidated in 1973. In September 1970, Mammoth Mart acquired two locations from Key Stores. The cost of liquidating Boston Baby, combined with the economic effects of the 1973 oil crisis, rising inflation, increased shrinkage and Phase IV of the Nixon Administration's program of Wage and Price Controls, forced the company to file for bankruptcy protection under Chapter XI of the Bankruptcy Act of 1898—one of the precursors (along with Chapter X of the 1898 Bankruptcy Act) of today's Chapter 11— on June 17, 1974. The chain was acquired by now-defunct King's Department Stores for $43 million (~$173 million in 2024) on June 15, 1977. The final locations were rebranded to King’s by Spring 1979.
