= Chautauqua Mall =

Coordinates: 42.095691°N 79.303603°W

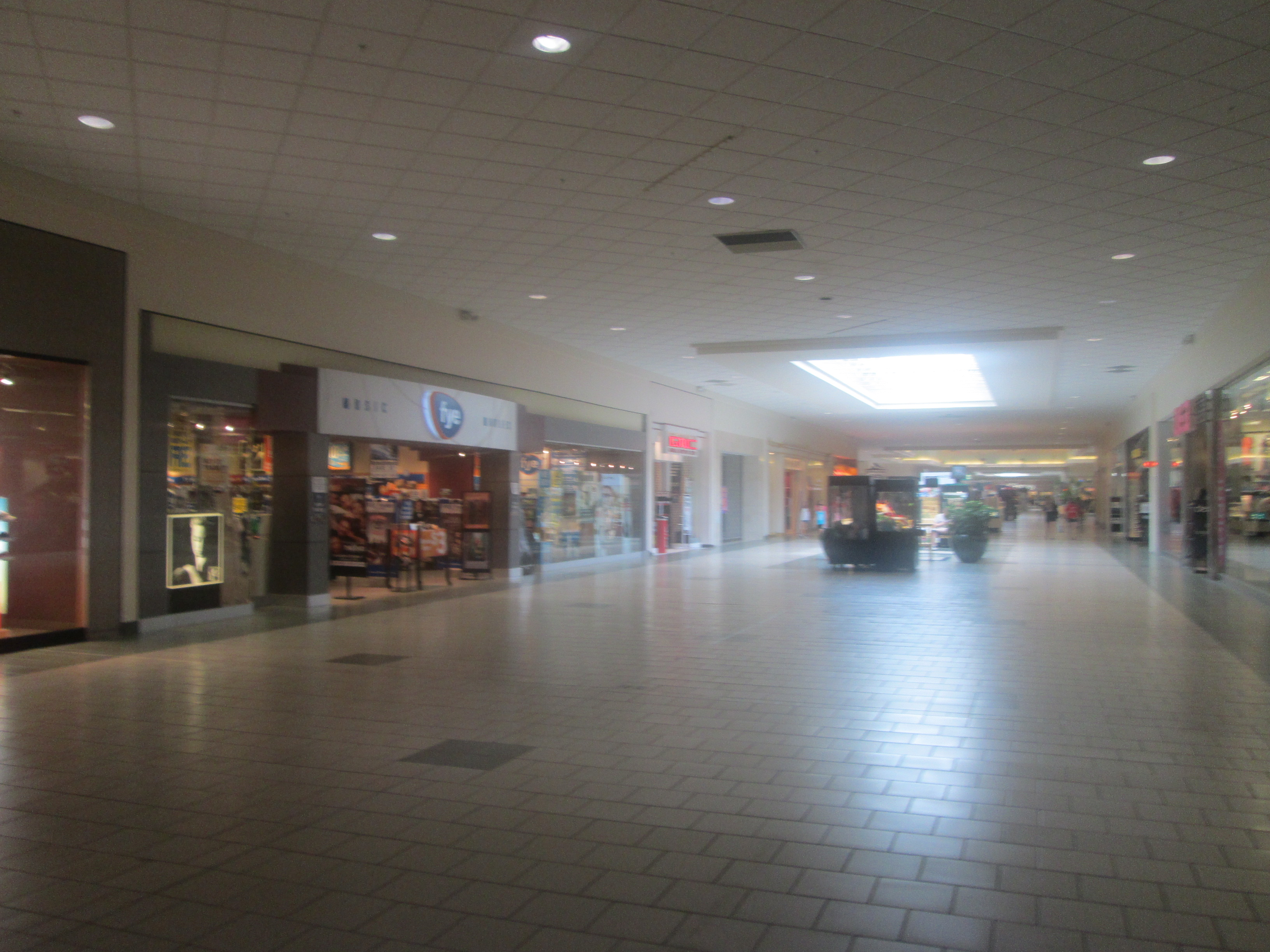
- Interior of Chautauqua Mall, September 2013
- Location: Lakewood, New York
- Address: 318 East Fairmount Avenue
- Opened: 1971; 55 years ago
- Developer: Edward J. DeBartolo, Sr.
- Owner: Kohan Retail Investment Group; Summit Properties USA
- Num. of stores: 31
- Num. of anchor tenants: 5
- Floor area: 435,415 square feet (40,451 m^{2})
- Floors: 1
- Website: https://www.chautauquamall.com/

Chautauqua Mall is an enclosed shopping mall in Lakewood, New York. Opened in 1971, the mall's anchor stores are Planet Fitness, and JCPenney. The mall is owned and managed by Kohan Retail Investment Group and Summit Properties USA.

== History ==
The mall opened in 1971 under the development of Edward J. DeBartolo, Sr. (whose company is now part of Simon Property Group), with Sears, Woolworth, JCPenney, and Quality Markets as its anchor stores. JCPenney vacated its store in 1986, which was later mostly converted to Jamesway that same year. (The remaining space was converted to Present Company). This new Jamesway store, the 100th in the chain, was a replacement for the first store in the Jamesway chain, located in nearby Jamestown.

Jamesway and Woolworth closed in 1993, and Quality Markets moved outside the mall. In 1997, JCPenney returned to the mall in the portion of the former Jamesway space, while the former Woolworth store was expanded to become a 60,000-square-foot (5,600 m^{2}) Bon-Ton. The remainder of the former Jamesway space later became OfficeMax. Several new stores were also added, including Old Navy, Gap/GapKids, Spencer Gifts, new locations for Electronics Boutique and Hallmark Cards, and a food court. The food court closed in 1999 due to the original owner of its vendors withdrawing from the mall, but it reopened that same year with Orange Julius, Hot Stuff Pizza, and Mean Gene's Burgers. All of the restaurants closed by 2002, but the food court soon reopened again with local tenants and a Subway.

In 2013, an Olive Garden restaurant opened in front of the mall. The Bon-Ton closed on August 29, 2018. On February 19, 2021, it was announced that Ollie's Bargain Outlet would open.

In 2022, Kohan Retail Investment Group would become the new owners of Chautauqua Mall.

In June 2024, a zoning board and planning board meeting authorized the construction of both Chipotle and Popeyes chain restaurants to be constructed side by side next to the Olive Garden.

In May 2025, Joann Fabrics closed as the chain went out of business.
