= Landmark Medical Center =

Landmark Medical Center/Rehabilitation Hospital of Rhode Island
- Prime Healthcare Services
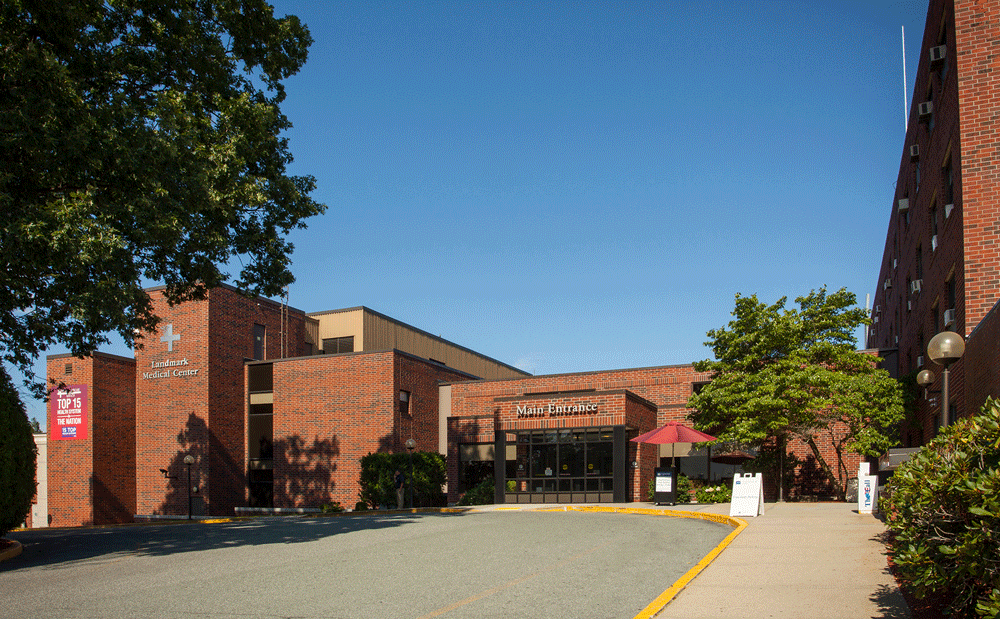

Geography
- Location: 115 Cass Avenue, Woonsocket, Rhode Island, United States
- Coordinates: 42°00′18″N 71°29′43″W

Organization
- Type: Community Hospital
- Affiliated university: New York Medical College

Services
- Beds: 214

History
- Opened: 1880 (merged 1988)

Links
- Website: landmarkmedical.org
- Lists: Hospitals in Rhode Island

The Landmark Medical Center is a private, for-profit acute care community hospital, a subsidiary of PrimeHealthcare Foundation, and located in Woonsocket, Rhode Island. The Rehabilitation Hospital of Rhode Island is located in North Smithfield, Rhode Island. The LMC facility is a teaching hospital for New York Medical College and is host to one of three of its internal medicine programs.

== History ==
In 1988 the hospital was created as a merger between Woonsocket Hospital and Fogarty Hospital of North Smithfield. In 1989, it became a nonprofit. In 2013, the hospital was renamed Landmark Medical Center. PrimeHealthcare Services of California purchased the assets. In November 2013, the incorporated foreign limited liability for-profit community hospital was called PrimeHealthcare Services-Landmark Medical Center, LLC. The hospital is a subsidiary of PrimeHealthcare for-profit and not-for-profit system. PrimeHealthCare Foundation, a nonprofit multibillion-dollar corporation, purchased 14 hospitals including Landmark Medical Center (LMC) and Rehabilitation Hospital of Rhode Island. The LMC hospital provides emergency, diagnostic, medical, surgical, cancer, cardiac, pain management, and obstetric care.

== See also ==
- List of hospitals in Rhode Island
