= Rehabilitation Hospital of Rhode Island =

- Prime Healthcare Services
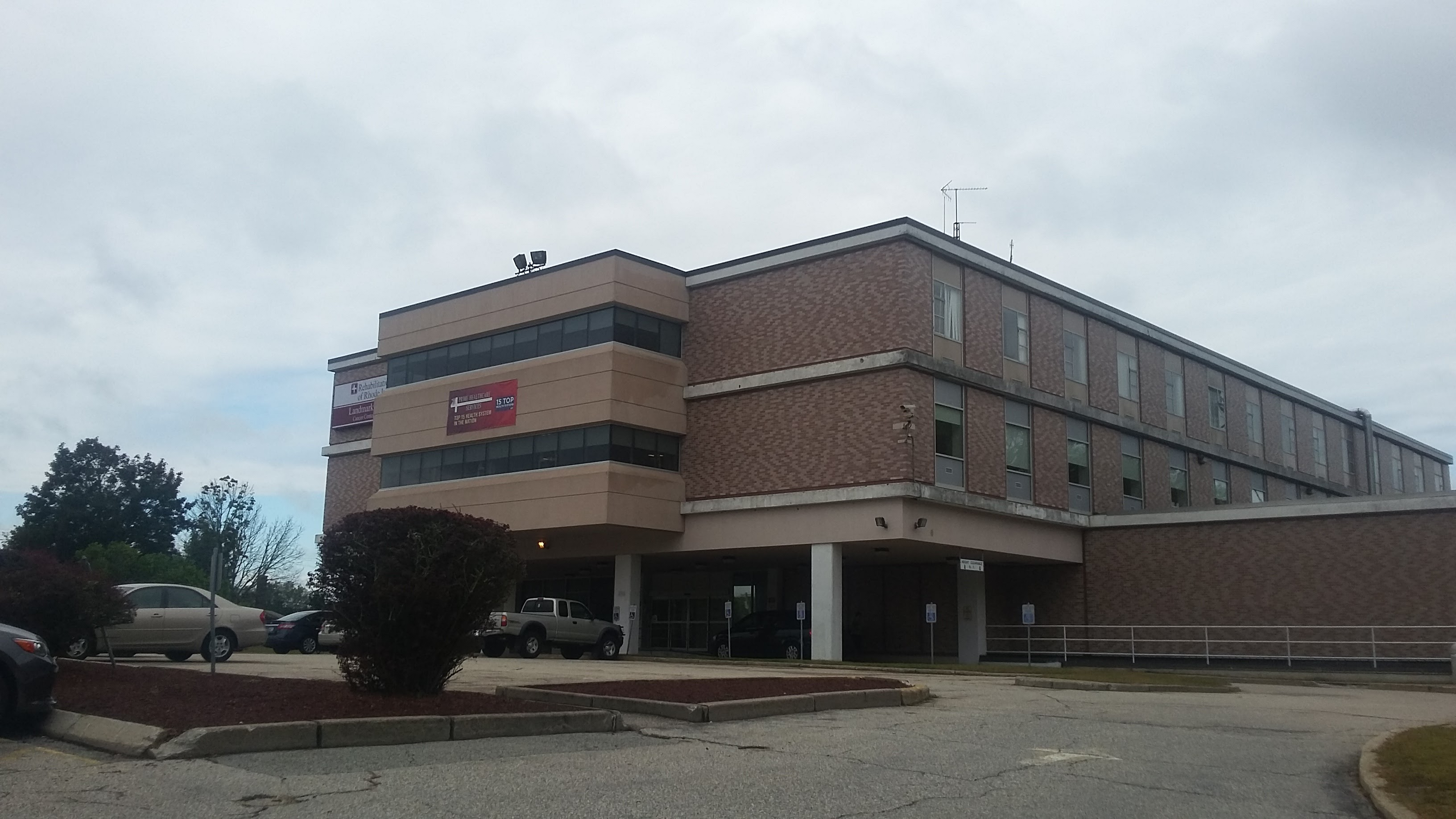

Geography
- Location: North Smithfield, Rhode Island, United States
- Coordinates: 41.9816°N 71.5128°W

Organization
- Type: Specialist

Services
- Beds: 82
- Speciality: Rehabilitation hospital

History
- Founded: 1965

Links
- Website: www.rhri.net
- Lists: Hospitals in Rhode Island

The Rehabilitation Hospital of Rhode Island (also known as Fogarty Hospital) is a private rehabilitation hospital at 116 Eddie Dowling Highway (Route 146A) in the Park Square area of North Smithfield, Rhode Island and with another unit, Landmark Medical Center in Woonsocket, Rhode Island. The Rehabilitation Hospital "is the only free-standing hospital in Rhode Island devoted exclusively to inpatient and outpatient rehabilitation" and provides treatment for "acute illness, traumatic injury, major surgery, or life-altering disease."

== History ==
The John E. Fogarty Memorial Hospital in North Smithfield was built in 1965 and named after U.S. Congressman John E. Fogarty, a proponent of health care improvements in America. In 1988, Fogarty Hospital of North Smithfield merged with Landmark Hospital of Woonosocket to become of the Fogarty Unit of Landmark Medical Center. In 2013, Prime Healthcare Services acquired the hospital.
