= Renee Sebastian =

Filipino-American musician (born 1973)

Renée Sebastian (born Darlene Renée Sebastian Domingo on August 7, 1973) is a Filipino-American soul-infused pop and R&B singer, songwriter, and owner of a bespoke fashion, beauty and tea company da.u.de.

== Early life ==
Sebastian was born in Monterey, California to Filipino parents and was raised in the Philippines. She is the second child and has one brother and one sister.

Encouraged by her teachers to embrace Performing Arts while attending Colegio San Agustin - Makati she became a member of the Cultural Center of the Philippines Girl's Choir. She also trained as a jazz and modern contemporary dancer under the Philippine professional dance group Hotlegs. Years later she would move to the Bay Area and train under top vocal coach, Seth Riggs who had orchestrated vocal arrangements for musical legends Michael Jackson, Luther Vandross, Barbra Streisand, Enrique Iglesias, Natalie Cole and Quincy Jones. Sebastian studied at the illustrious Jazz School at Berkeley, California. Renee holds a Bachelor of Science degree in Computer Science with a minor in Mathematics from Saint Peter's College in Jersey City, New Jersey.

Sebastian was also a competitive swimmer. She trained under Liwanag Gonzales at Manila Army and Navy Club for youth sports. She swam for Colegio San Agustin - Makati high school athletics and for Saint Peter's College varsity sports.

== Music career ==
She emerged as a prolific, consistently engaging vocalist on the Bay Area R&B and Soul music scene in 2004 with her self-titled (but unreleased) debut album Reneessance. Since the release of her hit single Deliciously Dangerous, which won a Billboard songwriting award, she garnered radio adds nationwide. Her album received positive reviews from national trade publications, including an "R&B Pick of the Week" from Billboard magazine. She's a self-described "progressive artist" and creator of the New York City soul showcase series Blowout Lounge.

== Mrs. Sebastian (2008) ==
Her second album, Mrs. Sebastian, was released in 2008. The vocally challenging "This Is Me" is an R&B, Hip-Hop blend with a soulful but urban edge that boasts a unique chorus, while the ballad "Every Lesson," is a mid-tempo track that explores life lessons. The emotive first single "These Are The Signs" is another playful mid-tempo jam about the distinction between "love" and "making love." Surrounding herself with a team of multi-talented instrumentalists and producers including Keyon Harrold (50 Cent, Jay-Z), Hanan Rubinstein (Leela James), Raymond Angry (Christina Aguilera, Lauryn Hill, Joss Stone, Meshell N'degeocello) and Grammy Award winning Ralph Kearns, they all believed in Renee as a singer and wanted to contribute to the project.

In December 2008, Mrs. Sebastian was designated Mercedes Benz Album of the Month.

== Collaborations ==
She has shared the stage with notable artists Eric Roberson, Heavy, Jesse Boykins III, Russell Taylor, Nate James, Maya Azucena, Ra-Re Valverde, Peter Hadar, PJ Morton, to name a few.

== Discography ==
- 2008: Mrs. Sebastian EP
- 2004: Deliciously Dangerous Single
