= Stuarts (store) =

Company founded in New England in 1957

Stuarts Department Stores, Inc.
- Company type: Discount store
- Traded as: STUS: NASDAQ
- Industry: Retail
- Founded: 1957
- Defunct: 1995
- Fate: Chapter 11 Bankruptcy Liquidation
- Headquarters: New York City, New York
- Products: Clothing, footwear, bedding, furniture, jewelry, beauty products, electronics, and housewares.
- Website: None

Stuarts Department Stores Inc. was a company founded in New England in 1957. It incorporated as a Delaware corporation in 1983, around which time the regional clothing and houseware retailer had stores in every state in New England with a primary focus on Massachusetts. Its stock once traded for close to $30 a share.

== History ==
Through the 1980s and 1990s, the store went through a variety of major changes. First, the chain tried to shed its image as a reseller of leftover department store merchandise by investing in their own label. They also invested a major amount of capital into a cosmetic overhaul of their real estate that introduced a more "Bradlees"-like color scheme. They rapidly expanded to 26 outlets, including the purchase of Harry's of Barre, Vermont. A major distribution and office complex was also built in Franklin, Massachusetts.

During all of this change, there was instability in corporate management. The chaos this caused resulted in a missed opportunity for this small retailer. They never modernized their sales/inventory tracking systems at the store level. While other chains like Rich's were already using barcode scanners, computerized shipping manifests, and automated sales result reports, Stuarts was still doing it by hand. By the early 1990s, shares struggled to maintain $1 per share.

The company filed for Chapter 11 protection in December 1990, emerged from the Chapter 11 case in October 1992, and re-filed for protection under Chapter 11 in May 1995. Shortly thereafter, it went out of business.

== Presidents/CEOs ==
- 1989; Joseph Ettore
