= King's (defunct discount store) =

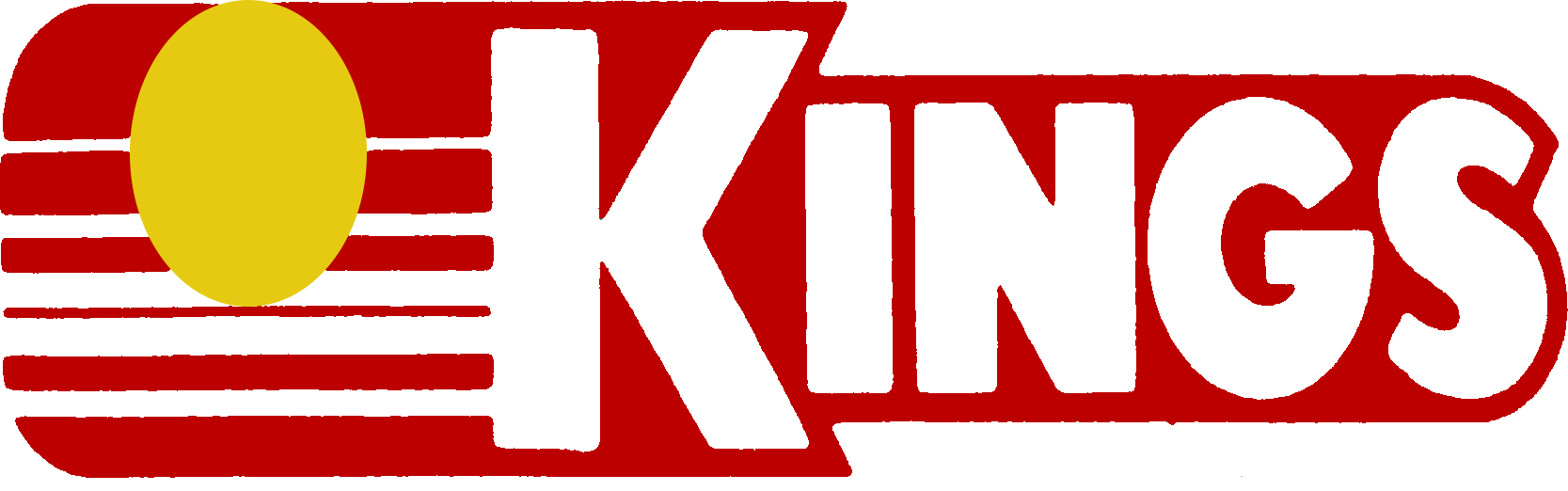
- Type: Discount store
- Industry: Retail
- Founded: Brockton, Massachusetts; 1956
- Defunct: 1984
- Fate: Bankruptcy; all locations sold to Ames
- Successor: Ames (1984-2002)

King's Department Stores was a chain of discount stores in the Eastern United States. The chain started in 1956, in Brockton, Massachusetts. They expanded to 187 stores (three stores operated in the Buffalo, New York area). In 1978, they purchased the bankrupt Mammoth Mart chain. In that same year, the company had a proposed merger W.R. Grace, which would have added $325 million in sales revenue to Grace after the merger. However, in June of 1978, the merger was called off.

Because of the economic downturn and the debt from the Mammoth purchase, they filed for Chapter 11 bankruptcy in 1982. In 1984, Ames Department Stores purchased the chain and converted most of them into Ames stores. Ames went out of business in 2002.

== Retail chains acquired by King's ==
- Barker's Discount Department Stores (1980)
- Mammoth Mart (1977)
- Classic logo
  Miracle Mart (1968) United States based chain, not to be confused with the Canadian chain by the same name
- Sandy's Discount Stores (1966)
- Welles (1973)
