= Ames Department Stores =

Defunct American discount store chain

Ames Department Stores, Inc.

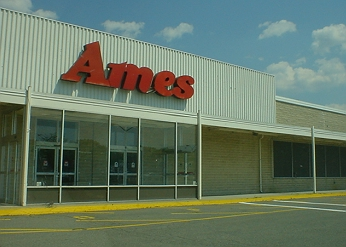
- An Ames location in Seabrook, New Hampshire, originally a King's. Now demolished as of August 2025.
- Type: Public
- Industry: Retail
- Founded: 1958; 68 years ago in Southbridge, Massachusetts, U.S.
- Defunct: October 19, 2002; 24 years ago
- Fate: Chapter 7 Bankruptcy Liquidation
- Headquarters: Rocky Hill, Connecticut, U.S.
- Number of locations: 327 (August 2002)
- Key people: Joseph R. Ettore, Chairman and CEO; Peter Hollis, President and CEO; Milton Gilman, Co-Founder and Chairman; Irving Gilman, Co-Founder and President; Herbert Gilman, Co-Founder, Senior VP, Chairman and CEO; Philip Feltman, Co-Founder and Senior VP
- Products: Clothing, footwear, bedding, furniture, jewelry, beauty products, toys, electronics and housewares
- Website: amesstores.com at the Wayback Machine (archived November 27, 2001)

Ames Department Stores, Inc. was an American chain of discount stores based in Rocky Hill, Connecticut, United States. The company was founded in 1958 with a store in Southbridge, Massachusetts, and at its peak operated 700 stores in 20 states, including the Northeast, Upper South, Midwest, and the District of Columbia, making it the fourth-largest discount retailer in the country.

Despite some success in its later years, Ames struggled with debt from acquisitions and a slow decline in sales in the new global market and suburban developments. This resulted in two bankruptcy filings that ultimately put an end to the chain. The company, despite expanding into other markets and taking over many closed stores abandoned by competitors, went out of business in 2002.

== History ==
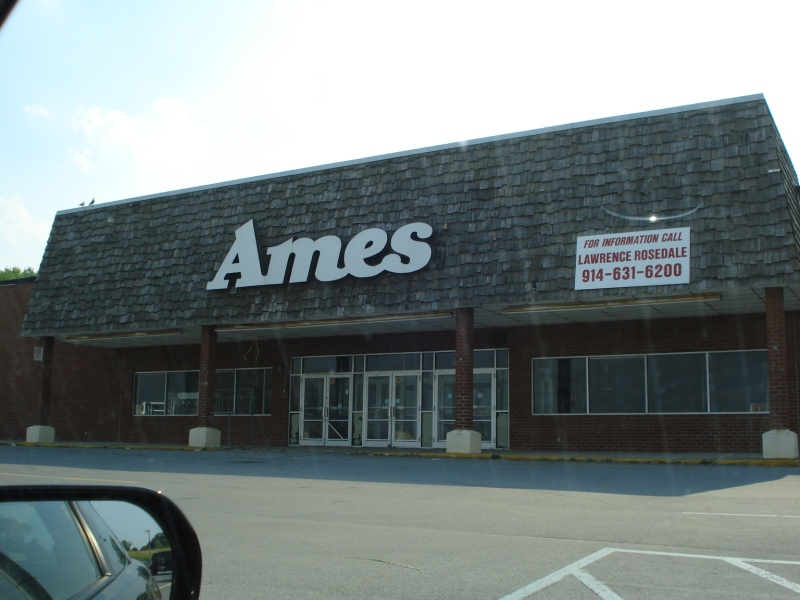
A vacant Ames in Lowville, New York.

Ames began in 1958 when three Connecticut brothers, Milton, Irving, and Herbert Gilman, joined with their partner Philip Feltman, opened their first store in the Ames Worsted Textile Co. mill in Southbridge. The Gilmans and Feltman simply used the old sign of the textile mill for the new business. In 1971, this store was replaced with a modern store in Sturbridge, Massachusetts. A second store opened in October 1959 in St. Johnsbury, Vermont.

Ames’ early business strategy focused on bringing discount retailing to smaller towns and rural areas of the Northeast. The company's success in serving a largely rural customer base in smaller, less-competitive markets resulted in consistently strong financial performance and steady growth combining acquisitions and an aggressive store-building program through the late 1980s.

Many of the first stores were converted industrial sites, such as the first store in a former textile mill. Ames exploited the availability of cheap real estate in this manner in the first decades of the company, later moving to custom-built store facilities that provided standardized planning and marketing.

Ames' stock was added to the American Stock Exchange in May 1967. The company later started trading on the NYSE in November 1972.

=== Wave of expansion and first bankruptcy ===
Ames acquired the 32-store "Big N" chain from Neisner Brothers in November 1978. In 1984 Ames acquired the King's Department Stores chain and added most of its 193 stores to the fold. In 1985 Ames acquired G.C. Murphy of McKeesport, Pennsylvania, a chain that operated both discount stores and variety stores (the variety stores and many of the smaller G.C. Murphy discount stores would eventually be sold by Ames to McCrory Stores in 1989). Three years after the acquisition of G.C. Murphy, Ames expanded further, acquiring the 392-store Zayre chain in 1988. Saddled with increased debt and hampered by the additional cost of converting those stores to Ames stores, the company suffered a significant reduction in profitability in late 1989 and early 1990. The Zayre chain also operated with stores concentrated in three distinct regions, the Northeast, Illinois and Florida, which made coordination difficult.

Older Ames logo which used a red color scheme.

In April 1990, Ames filed for bankruptcy protection under Chapter 11 of the U.S. Bankruptcy Code. One of the causes of the bankruptcy appeared to be Ames' policy of extending consumer credit to almost anyone who asked, without first checking their credit rating, in an attempt to increase Ames' market share. Ames had also replaced the Zayre credit card program with Visa cards that could be used anywhere Visa was accepted. This often resulted in Ames giving credit cards to customers who were already in debt, and they tended to attract high risk borrowers who tended to default on their debt payments. During their bankruptcy, Ames closed 370 land-based stores, the highest building properties in rural regions of the Northeast. It was also during this time that Ames changed its logo, trading in its traditional red and white colors for the turquoise color present in Zayre stores; this eventually became an identifying mark of most Ames stores.

=== Emergence from bankruptcy, expansions, and acquisition of Hills ===
After successfully emerging from bankruptcy on December 30, 1992, the company returned to profitability in 1993 and improved its operating performance. Net income increased to $17.3 million for 1996 (equivalent to $35.5 million in 2025) (fiscal year ended January 25, 1997), compared with a net loss of $1.6 million for fiscal 1995 (equivalent to $3.38 million in 2025). Income before other charges and gains for the fiscal 1996 year was $33.3 million (equivalent to $68.4 million in 2025), compared with $6.9 million in the prior fiscal year (equivalent to $14.6 million in 2025), a $26.4 million (equivalent to $54.2 million in 2025) improvement. During the 1990s, Ames was also known for moving into many former locations of its competitors. The chain added several Bradlees stores that closed in the early part of the decade and opened 12 new stores in 1996, 11 of which were former Jamesway stores when that chain went out of business in late 1995. In 1998 Ames took over Hills (store) which was very big at the time and caused a major expansion for Ames. Ames also took over several Caldor locations after its liquidation in 1999, as well as a few Montgomery Ward stores when that chain closed later that year.

=== Notability and Recognition ===
With the acquisition of Hills Department Stores in 1998, Ames became the nation's fourth-largest discount retail chain behind Walmart, Kmart, and Target. Although Hills was headquartered in suburban Boston, its stores were concentrated in Indiana, Kentucky, Ohio, Pennsylvania, and western New York, which was a regional complement to Ames stores in the northeast; the two did overlap in Western Pennsylvania (the former home base of G. C. Murphy), though aside from a few scattered Ames locations such as in Ellwood City, Pennsylvania, the region was largely Hills territory and it's that chain more fondly remembered in Greater Pittsburgh, including by the web series Pittsburgh Dad. Then, Ames had just over 600 stores, mostly in the Northeast and Midwest, employing about 22,000.

=== Expansion into Chicago ===
In 1986, Ames moved into the Chicago area by acquiring Zayre, and later in 2000 by acquiring all but one of the seven Goldblatt's department stores. Other locations included former Venture and Builders Square stores, making for a total of 11 stores. The company hoped to target the low-income and ethnic consumer, using techniques that were proven successful. "The stores are generally on the South Side of Chicago, which has a low-income base," a Ladenburg Thalmann analyst Beder said. Before the opening day, a television marketing campaign showed cheery Ames employees working while singing "My Kind of Town," a song that strongly referred to Chicago. Billboards read, "Our Kind of Town, Your Kind of Discount Store". On September 21, 2000, Ames opened eight of its Chicago stores and opened the others shortly thereafter. A few months later, Ames opened a few additional stores.

=== 1999–2002: Second bankruptcy and demise ===
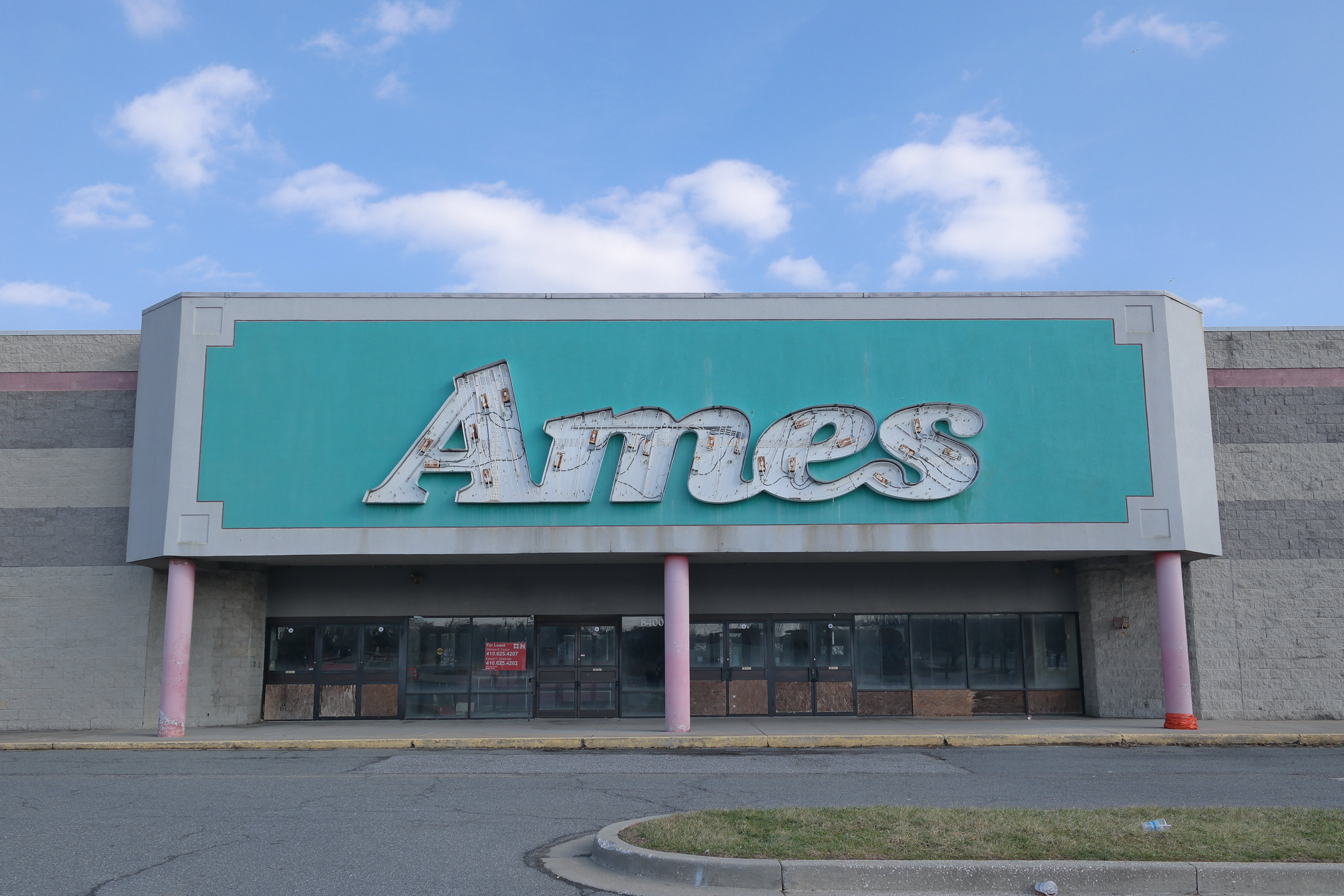
Former Ames in Baltimore, Maryland, originally a Zayre (now demolished)

In March 1999, Ames closed 8 stores. In November 2000, Ames closed 32 stores, 31 of which were the newly acquired Hills. Some of these closings had been anticipated, as these were considered the weakest of the Hills chain. On August 20, 2001, Ames closed another 47 stores. The company filed for bankruptcy protection for the second time. In November 2001, Ames closed 16 more stores and a distribution center. In December 2001, Ames closed 54 additional stores. Ames closed another six stores in June 2002, leaving the chain with 327 stores, about half of what it had in 1998.

On August 14, 2002, Ames' executives announced they would close the remaining 327 stores in the chain and wind-down business, converting the Chapter 11 bankruptcy reorganization to a Chapter 7 bankruptcy liquidation. "Continued softness in sales, combined with tightening terms and slower shipments from our suppliers, have reduced our funds availability below critical levels," Ames' chairman and CEO Joseph R. Ettore, who had presided over the bankruptcy and liquidation of Stuart's and Jamesway prior to joining Ames, said about Ames' decision to go out of business. Analysts generally attribute the bankruptcy to debt from the Hills Department Stores acquisition and the tightened credit markets of 2001. The expansion of Walmart into the Northeast further intensified competition and contributed to Ames’ decline.

In the Pittsburgh area, Target was already planning and had started an expansion into that area just as Ames was struggling, capitalizing on Ames' problems. (Indeed, at least one former Ames location, a converted Hills in Pittsburgh's North Hills along McKnight Road, would be occupied by Target after Ames's liquidation.) After the emergence from the first Chapter 11, buying the Hills department stores essentially became its demise. The purchase of Hills stores, following limited profitability, increased the company’s debt-to-income ratio to record levels. With no other options, and creditors pulling out of contracts due to failure to pay, corporate made the decision to file for a second, and final bankruptcy.

Private investment company Oak Point Partners acquired the residual assets from the Ames Department Stores, Inc., et al., Bankruptcy Estates on December 18, 2012.

=== Legacy and revival hoax ===
In December 2022, it was reported that Molyneux Group, who purportedly owned the assets of Bradlees Department Stores PLC, announced that Ames Department Stores would be returning after 21 years and will be opening locations in Connecticut once again starting in the Spring of 2023. The company posted a new website announcing as such on amesstores.com, the domain which the chain used from 1996 until its bankruptcy in 2002. The same month, reporters from WJAR and WVIT investigated the claims of the store's revival, with both reporters noting that they were unable to make contact with anyone involved with Molyneux Group. The project is allegedly led by Molyneux Group's American division, Silver Knight Group. The website only featured the store's logo and text telling readers that the brand would be returning in spring 2023 and to pay attention to the website for announcements on the first new locations. However, some observers have expressed skepticism about the project’s authenticity, with some suggesting that it may be a hoax.

In September 2023, the site was updated, removing all references to new stores opening or the Spring 2023 timeline, the site simply displayed a statement from the "Board of Directors" referencing a shakeup of the board due to mismanagement and other references to stakeholders and the Ames community.

In March 2024, it was reported that Ames announced plans to open new brick-and-mortar stores starting in June 2026, with plans of 35 locations by late 2027, and that all 35 locations would have an Ames Cafe and click and collect services, with select locations having a pharmacy as well; seven distribution centers were also planned to handle deliveries.

At this time, the Providence Journal found no evidence that Cross Moline Ventures or Molyneux Group ever existed, and that the spokesperson, Shannon de Molyneux, also does not appear to be a real person.

An Instagram post later claimed that Cross Moline Ventures was rebranding as "Silver Knight Group." There is no evidence that this company or anyone supposedly associated with it exists, either.
