= Blaise Ffrench =

American entrepreneur and actor

- Born: April 30, 1990 (age 36); Queens, New York, U.S.
- Education: Saint Peter's University
- Occupations: Business executive; actor; NBA agent

Blaise Ffrench (born 30 April 1990) is an American actor, model, NBA agent and influencer. He was featured on Forbes 30 Under 30 2019 and one of the brand builders and early investors in BODYARMOR Sports drink. He is also known for his role in CBS's The Code and Marry Me.

== Background ==
Ffrench was born in Queens, New York, where he spent his early years and he was raised by his mother, who died when he was 15 years old. His hometown is South Jamaica, Queens, N.Y. and he is the nephew of record executive, Irv Gotti.

== High school and college athlete ==
He attended Holy Cross High School, a former all boys school, where played basketball and baseball. As a basketball player in high school he received several accolades including first team All-State, second team All-City and first team All-Queens as a senior and named All-Area and All-District in his junior year, additionally winning the city and state championships.

Ffrench received an athletic scholarship to the University of Texas at El Paso in 2008, before transferring to Saint Peter's University, where continued to play basketball from 2009 until 2011. While in Saint Peter's University, he played in NCAA Division I men's basketball tournament in 2011 and was second in scoring with 13.4 PPG, second in rebounds with 4.5, assist leader with 6.3 per game for his team, Saint Peter's Peacocks. He completed his bachelors and master’s degrees in Business management at Saint Peter's University.

== Career ==
He was part of the cast of CBS's The Code (2019), Marry Me (2022), Plan B (2024), Hulu's Wu-Tang: An American Saga and Starz's Power; amongst others. He is also seen in the Sex in the City reboot, And Just Like That. As an influencer, he has more than 5 million followers across social media platforms. As a model, he has collaborated Saks Fifth Avenue, Target, Banana Republic, Stance, Fashion Nova Men, True Religion. He also worked on campaigns with Puma, Alo and Xtep.

In 2017, Ffrench became one of the creators of BODYARMOR sports drink, contributing to its sale and marketing from its conception and being one of its early investors. BODYARMOR was eventually sold to Coca-Cola for $5.4 billion US dollars. His work with BODYARMOR earned him a spot on the Forbes 30 Under 30 list in 2019. He first got involved with Mike Repole, the creator of BODYARMOR and an alumnus of Ffrench's high school Holy Cross High School, visited the school.

Ffrench is an adjunct professor at Saint Peter's University. In 2016, he began his NBA agency. He took part in one of New York Knicks celebrity games. Inspired by his uncle, music executive Irv Gotti, Ffrench ventured into the entertainment industry. He threw the ceremonial first pitch at one of the New York Mets game. He has participated in events such as Academy of Country Music Awards in 2024 and was a member of the host committee for the Whitney Museum of American Art's 2020 exhibition.

== Filmography ==
=== Film & Television ===
Year	Title	Role
2019	The Code	Sam
2021	Sustenance	Javon
2022	Murder Under the Friday Night Lights	William Griffin
2022	Marry Me	Co-worker
2023	The Tactical Combat Simulator	Fighter
2024	Plan B	Samuel
