= Robert G. Lahita =

American physician

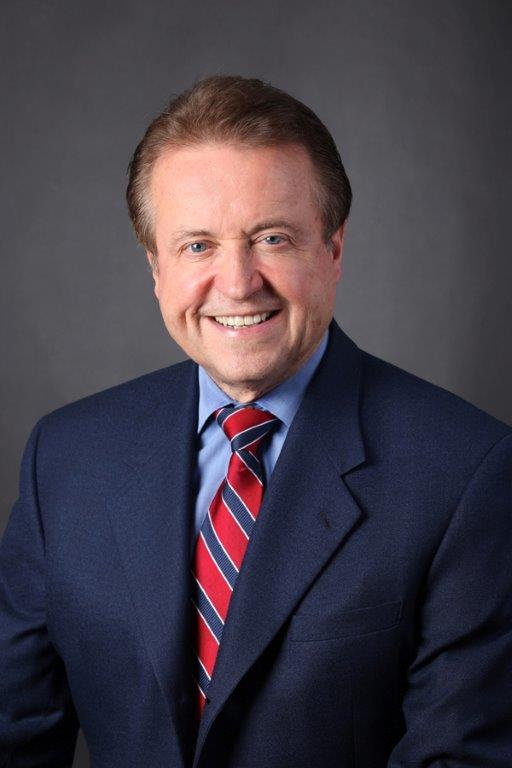
Robert G. Lahita, MD, PhD

Robert George Lahita is an American physician, internist and rheumatologist, best known for his research into systemic lupus erythematosus. and other autoimmune diseases. He is the author of more than 16 books and 150 scientific publications in the field of autoimmunity and immuno-endocrinology and a media consultant on health-related issues. He currently serves as Director of the Institute of Autoimmune and Rheumatic Diseases at St. Joseph's Healthcare System, specializing in autoimmunity, rheumatology, and treatment of diseases of joints, muscle, bones and tendons including arthritis, back pain, muscle strains, common athletic injuries and collagen diseases.

Lahita is a clinical professor at New Jersey Medical School, an adjunct professor at the Icahn School of Medicine at Mount Sinai, and a full professor of medicine at Hackensack Meridian School of Medicine. He is a fellow of the American College of Physicians, a master of the American College of Rheumatology, a fellow of the Royal College of Physicians, a Fellow of the Royal Society of Medicine, and a Fellow of the New York Academy of Sciences. His research interests are the molecular aspects of antigen expression in response to sex hormones in the autoimmune diseases, reasons for female predisposition of autoimmune disease, and the etiopathogenesis of the phospholipid syndrome. In 2004, Dr. Lahita was given a Doctor of Humane Letters (honoris causa) by St. Peter’s University.

Lahita is the editor of the standard textbook Systemic Lupus Erythematosus (5th edition), now Lahita's Systemic Lupus Erythematosus (6th edition) and the Senior Editor of the Textbook of Autoimmune Diseases. Lahita is the Associate Editor of Lupus, An International Journal and was co-editor of the Yearbook of Rheumatology (out of print). He is the author of four books for the general public, Lupus, Q&A; Everything You Need to Know, The Arthritis Solution Rheumatoid Arthritis: Everything You Need to Know, Women and Autoimmune Disease; The Mysterious Way the Body Betrays Itself, and Immunity Strong - Boost Your Natural Healing Power and Live to 100.

On September 11, 2001, Lahita triaged and treated those involved in the disaster that were transported to Jersey City, New Jersey by ferry. He was featured in Life Magazine's Faces of Ground Zero.

== Early life ==
Lahita graduated from Saint Benedict's Preparatory School in Newark, New Jersey in 1963. In the 1960s Lahita attended Saint Peter's University, Jersey City, N.J., where he received a Bachelor of Science degree in biology in 1967. He received his medical degree in 1973 and a PhD in microbiology with Russell W. Schaedler, Chairman of the Department of Microbiology from Thomas Jefferson University, Philadelphia, Pennsylvania.

== Published works ==
- Lahita, Robert G., Tsokos, George, editor. Systemic Lupus Erythematosus. John Wiley & Sons, 1986. 2nd Edition, Churchill Livingstone, 1992. 3rd edition, Academic Press, 1999. 4th Edition, Academic Press, 2004. 5th Edition, Elsevier Academic Press, 2011.
- Lahita, R. and Phillips, R., Lupus: Q and A:Everything You Need to Know. Avery Press, 1998. (Foreword by Barbara Bush). 2nd edition, 2004. 3rd edition 2014.
- Lahita, Robert G., The Arthritis Solution: The Newest Treatments To Help You Live Pain-Free. Avon Press, 1999.
- Lahita, R. and Moore, P., editors. Neuropsychiatric Manifestations of Systemic Lupus Erythematosus. Annals of the New York Academy of Sciences, 1999.
- Lahita, Robert G., Chiorazzi, N. and Reeves, W., editors. Textbook of Autoimmune Diseases. Volume 355. Lippincott Williams and Wilkins, 2000.
- Lahita, Robert G., Rheumatoid Arthritis: Everything You Need to Know. Avery Press 2001.
- Lahita, Robert G., Yalof, Ina L. Women and Autoimmune Disease, The Mysterious Way the Body Betrays Itself. Regan Books, 2005.
- Cutolo, M, Lahita, R.G., Bijlsma, J.W.J., Masi, A., Straub, R.H., editors. Basic and Clinical Aspects of Neuroendocrine Immunology in Rheumatic Diseases. vol 1069, Wiley-Blackwell, 2006.
- Lahita, Robert G., Immunity Strong: Boost Your Body's Natural Healing Power and Live to 100 Humanix Books, 2022.

== Published research ==
Xiong, W. and R.G. Lahita. Novel Treatments for Systemic Lupus Erythematosus. Vol 3, no 5, pp255–266. Therapeutic Advances in Musculoskeletal Disease. 2011.
