= John E. Fogarty =

American politician

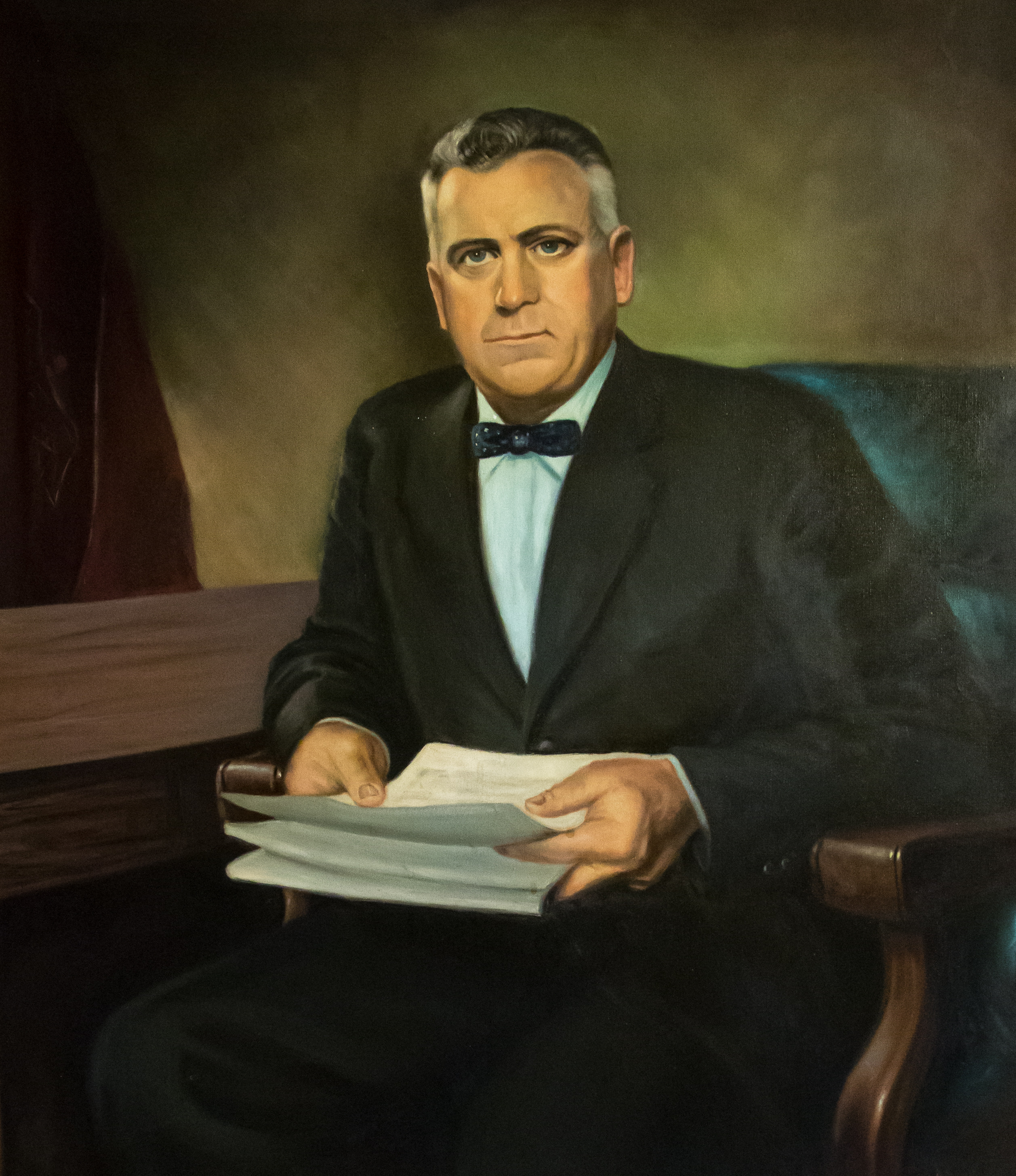

Member of the U.S. House of Representatives from Rhode Island's 2nd district
- In office January 3, 1941 – December 7, 1944
- Preceded by: Harry Sandager
- Succeeded by: Himself
- In office February 7, 1945 – January 10, 1967
- Preceded by: Himself
- Succeeded by: Robert Tiernan

Personal details
- Born: John Edward Fogarty; March 23, 1913 Providence, Rhode Island
- Died: January 10, 1967 (aged 53) Washington, D.C.
- Resting place: St. Ann's Cemetery, Cranston
- Party: Democratic
- Spouse: Luise Rohland
- Education: Providence College
- Occupation: Bricklayer

John Edward Fogarty (March 23, 1913 – January 10, 1967) was a congressman from Rhode Island for 26 years. He was a member of the Democratic Party. He was influential in passing numerous legislations and acts. For his service he received awards and honors.

== Early life and education ==
John E. Fogarty was born in Providence, Rhode Island, March 23, 1913. He attended La Salle Academy and Providence College, afterwards settling in Harmony, Rhode Island. Fogarty was employed as a bricklayer and was also active in Rhode Island's Bricklayers Union Number 1, of which he became president.

== Political and military career ==
=== Start of political career ===
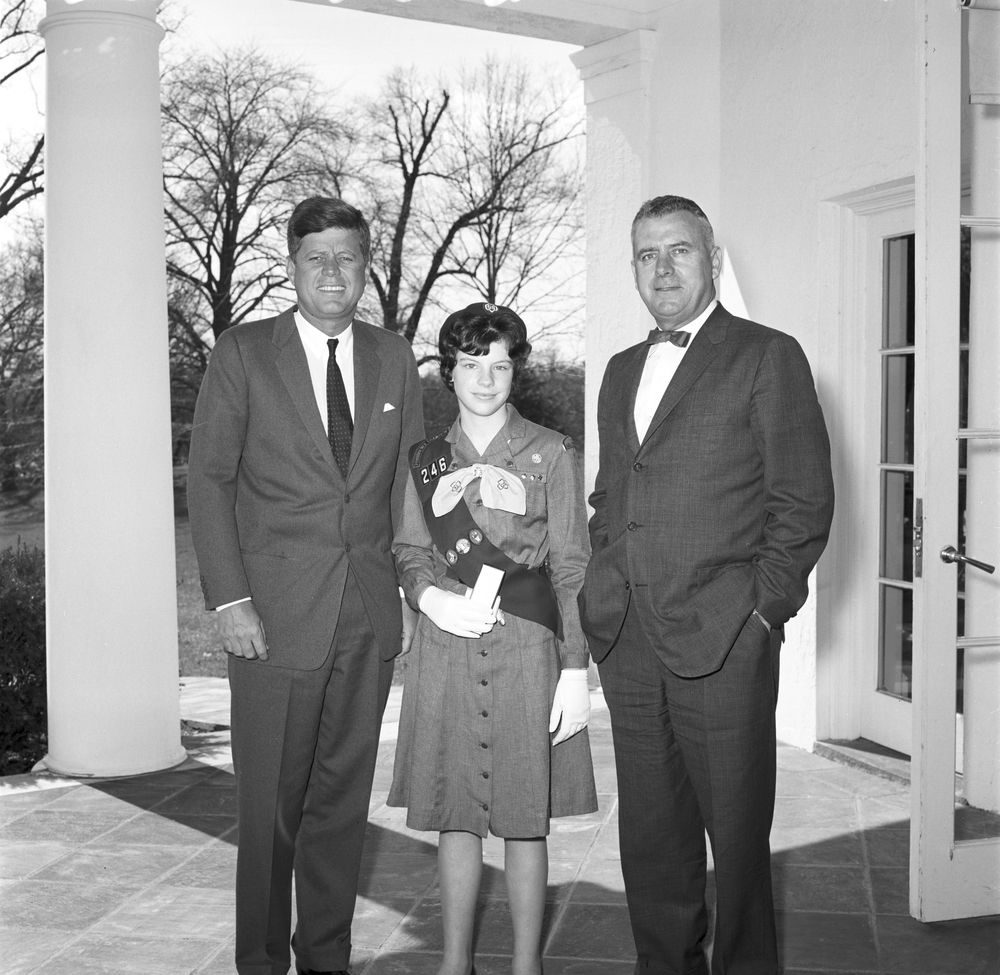
Fogarty and his daughter, Mary, with President John F. Kennedy in 1962

In 1940 Fogarty was a successful Democratic candidate for the United States House of Representatives. He served from January 3, 1941, until his death.

From December 1944 to February 1945 he traveled and worked with a Seabee battalion in the Pacific Theater as a member of the Naval Affairs Committee.

=== Appropriations Committee ===
In January 1947, he was assigned to the Appropriations Committee and served on the subcommittee providing funds for the Departments of Labor, Health, Education and Welfare longer than any other member in the history of Congress. As Chairman of the subcommittee for 16 years, Fogarty became nationally known as the spokesman for medical research in the Congress. He is often referred to as the "Champion of Better Health for the Nation."

During his years on the Committee, appropriations for the National Institutes of Health rose from $3.5 Million in 1946 to $1.5 Billion for fiscal 1967. It was in 1955, at the instigation of Fogarty, that Federal funds in the amount of $750,000 were first appropriated for activities in the field of the intellectually disabled and by 1967 was increased to $334 Million. This increase in available funds permitted the Institutes to take great strides forward in their constant search to find the cause and cure of today's killing and crippling diseases.

=== Library Services Act ===
Fogarty worked with Senator J. Lister Hill to establish the Library Services Act (1956). The history of this effort is highlighted in James Healey's monograph: John E. Fogarty: Political Leadership for Library Development. Congressman Fogarty was impressed by the pioneer work of Rhode Island state librarian, Elizabeth Myer, and went on to champion extension of library service.

=== Health for Peace bill ===
Congressman Fogarty, in conjunction with Senator J. Lister Hill (D-Alabama), was the sponsor of the Hill-Fogarty "Health for Peace" Bill, which opened up further opportunities for support of research and training on an international basis that would improve the health of the American people. Fogarty was responsible for the enactment of authorizing legislation and the appropriation of funds for construction of the National Institute of Dental Research. The Fogarty bill to provide for the expansion of teaching and research for intellectually disabled citizens was enacted into law, as were his bills to authorize wide distribution of books and other special instruction materials for the blind, and to provide teachers for the deaf and educational films for the deaf. The White House Conference on Aging was the result of legislation successfully sponsored by Mr. Fogarty and led to the enactment into law in the 89th Congress of his bill to establish an Administration of Aging The U.S. Administration on Aging (AoA) in the Department of Health, Education and Welfare. He was the original sponsor of legislation that established the Older Americans Act of 1965.

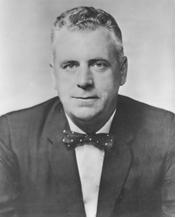
John E. Fogarty

=== Other legislation ===
Other legislation sponsored by Fogarty, which was enacted into law in the 89th Congress, provides for a National Technical Institute for the Deaf, Control of Drug Abuse, Community Mental Health Centers Act Amendments, Community Health Service Amendments, Health Research Facilities Amendments, Water Pollution Control Act, Medical Complex Centers for Heart Disease, Cancer and Stroke, Medical Library Assistance Act, Library Services Act Amendments, The Model Secondary School for the Deaf Act and the Vocational Rehabilitation Act. Fogarty was the original sponsor of the legislation providing for the National Foundation on Arts and Humanities and was instrumental in the enactment of the Manpower Act of 1965 and the Economic Opportunity Amendments of 1965 Answers - The Most Trusted Place for Answering Life's Questions.

Fogarty introduced several bills which gained nationwide support, including PREVENTICARE aimed at providing multiphasic health screening tests for all Americans age 50 and over to help detect chronic diseases and legislation to amend the Social Security Act which would increase benefit payments by an average of 50% and provide other benefits, as well as extend and improve programs of child welfare services and bills to furnish improved health education by providing that qualified health educators be placed in schools to teach health education as an academic subject.

== Personal life and death ==
Fogarty was married to Luise Rohland. He served in the House until his death from a heart attack in Washington, D.C., on January 10, 1967, shortly before he was to be sworn in for his fourteenth term. Fogarty was buried in Cranston's St. Ann's Cemetery. He was survived by his wife (died October 21, 2011) and daughter, Mary Fogarty McAndrew and her husband, Thomas, five grandchildren, John Maxwell, Mercedes, Hope, Marya, Cornelia (Sally) and seven great grandchildren.

== Awards and honors ==
John Fogarty was awarded distinguished service citations by many national health organizations, veterans groups, educational associations and business chambers. He was appointed by the President of the United States as Congressional Advisor to the U.S. Delegation to the World Health Assembly on seven different occasions, and was honored by the Italian Government by a decree from the President conferring the title "Commedatore al Merito della Repubblica Italiana." Mr. Fogarty was named by a leading national magazine as one of the Ten Outstanding Members of Congress who have done most for the youth of our country. Another publication, Parents Magazine, awarded him its National Distinguished Service Medal for his work on behalf of children. In articles, MEDICAL WORLD NEWS has referred to Mr. Fogarty as "Health Spokesman in the House" – SCIENCE Magazine said of his work in the field of medicine – "Fogarty has an incredible ability .. to get things moving." .. and in a later article refers to ".. Fogarty's deep, undiscriminating humanitarian impulse." – Newsweek magazine referred to him as "Mr. Public Health" and Modern Medicine called him "one of the most influential and knowledgeable men in the nation's health affairs." Throughout his Rhode Island district, Fogarty was widely known as "Everybody's Congressman."

In 1959, Fogarty received the national Albert Lasker Award for championing the advancement of medical research and public health. The $5,000 honorarium which accompanied the award was donated by Mr. Fogarty to the then Rhode Island Parents Council for Mentally Retarded Children. When Mr. Fogarty was designated as a winner of the Leadership Award by the Kennedy Foundation given to the public official whose activities have awakened the public conscience or led to increased community effort on behalf of the intellectually disabled, the Congressman donated the $8,000 honorarium which accompanied the award to the John E. Fogarty Foundation, a charitable and educational organization which encourages medical and educational research and fosters rehabilitation of the intellectually disabled. Today, the John E. Fogarty Foundation for Persons with Intellectual and Developmental Disabilities is chaired by Mr. Fogarty's daughter, Mary Fogarty McAndrew. It has raised millions of dollars and provides grants annually to organizations and institutions in Rhode Island that enhance the lives of individuals with intellectual and developmental disabilities.

On July 10, 1966, he was awarded American Library Association Honorary Membership by the American Library Association.

=== Dedications ===
In the State of Rhode Island five health and educational facilities have been dedicated in Mr. Fogarty's name – The John E. Fogarty Occupational Training Center for the Mentally Retarded – the John E. Fogarty Medical and Rehabilitation Unit at the Joseph H. Ladd School for the Mentally Retarded – the John E. Fogarty Health Science Building at the University of Rhode Island Colleges of Pharmacy and Nursing – and the John E. Fogarty School in Glocester, Rhode Island. The John E. Fogarty Memorial Hospital in North Smithfield was also named in his honor.

On July 10, 1966, he was awarded American Library Association Honorary Membership honorary membership by the American Library Association.

The John E. Fogarty Memorial Building was designed in 1968 by architects Castellucci, Galli, & Planka to house the state welfare office. Located at 111 Fountain Street in downtown Providence, the three-story brutalist structure was the size of an entire city block. Government offices moved out in 1999, and the building was used briefly as a middle school. After 2003, the building was abandoned. In 2016, the building was scheduled for demolition, to be replaced by a hotel, and finally demolished in 2017.

=== Honorary degrees ===
Congressman Fogarty received honorary degrees of Doctor of Laws from the University of Rhode Island, Doctor of Political Science from Providence College, Doctor of Science from Rhode Island School of Pharmacy and Doctor of Humane Letters from Bryant College. Mr. Fogarty has also received honorary degrees of Doctor of Laws from Brown University, Salve Regina College, Brandeis University, St. Francis College, Loretto, Pennsylvania; Women's Medical College of Pennsylvania; Georgetown University, the University of Notre Dame, Manhattan College and Loyola University. The New York Medical College has awarded him the honorary degree of Doctor of Science and Rhode Island College has awarded the honorary degree of Doctor of Pedagogy. The Congressman also received honorary degrees of Doctor of Laws from Howard University and Gallaudet College and Doctor of Science from the University of the Pacific in San Francisco and the College of Osteopathic Medicine and Surgery in Des Moines, Iowa. He was made an honorary member of the Rhode Island Medical Society and received an honorary fellowship from the American College of Dentists, the American Psychiatric Association and the American College of Osteopathic Internists. On February 3, 1966, President Johnson presented Mr. Fogarty with the American Heart Association 1966 Heart of the Year Award.

== Legacy ==
Upon his death, the Fogarty International Center was created at the National Institutes of Health in Bethesda, Maryland www.fic.nih.gov. It sponsors training for more than 5,000 scientists/doctors, operating programs in more than 100 countries, representing the NIH in international affairs. The Fogarty International Center works to combat infectious diseases and chronic diseases.

== See also ==
- List of members of the United States Congress who died in office (1950–1999)

U.S. House of Representatives
Preceded by Harry Sandager	Member of the U.S. House of Representatives from Rhode Island's 2nd congressional district 1941–1967	Succeeded by Robert Tiernan
