= Bradlees =

Discount retailer from the United States

- Traded as: NASDAQ:BRAD
- Industry: Retail
- Founded: March 14, 1958; 68 years ago
- Defunct: March 15, 2001; 25 years ago
- Fate: Chapter 7 Bankruptcy Liquidation
- Headquarters: Braintree, Massachusetts, U.S.
- Number of locations: 105 (2000)
- Products: Clothing, footwear, bedding, furniture, jewelry, beauty products, electronics, housewares
- Number of employees: 10,000 (2000)
- Parent: Stop & Shop (owned from 1961 to 1992)
- Website: Bradlees.com at the Wayback Machine (archived 2000-03-01)

Bradlees Department Store, more commonly known as Bradlees, was an American discount department store chain based in Braintree, Massachusetts, which operated primarily in the Northeastern United States. Bradlees sold various retail items in its stores, including clothing, jewelry, health care, beauty products, footwear, furniture, electronics, housewares, music and bedding. At its peak in the 1990s, Bradlees operated over 105 stores in seven states across the Northeast, with close to 10,000 employees. Along with being a part of Stop & Shop from 1961 until 1992, the chain went through Chapter 7 bankruptcy in 2000, with all of its stores eventually closing by March 15, 2001.

== History ==
Bradlees was named for Connecticut's Bradley International Airport, where early planning meetings were held by the store's founders. The first store was opened in New London, Connecticut, on March 14, 1958. The company was acquired by grocery chain Stop & Shop in 1961, which owned the chain until 1992. After the acquisition, Stop & Shop stores were often featured alongside Bradlees in the same shopping plazas. In some cases, especially in the New York/New Jersey metropolitan area, stores large enough to house both Bradlees and Stop & Shop under the same roof were constructed. In these early examples of supercenters, one side of the store would operate as Bradlees while the other would operate as Stop & Shop, and shoppers were able to move between one store and the other freely. This practice ended in 1982 when Stop & Shop elected to close its New York metro division; in the case of the supercenter stores, a wall was built to divide the building in half. (Stop & Shop would not return to the area until the fall of 2000, when its then-parent Ahold elected to rebrand its Edwards Super Food Stores chain as Stop & Shop.)

Like some of its competition, including Caldor, many Bradlees stores had snack stands/lunch counters that served soft drinks, hot dogs, French fries, soft pretzels, ice cream, prepackaged cookies, and various other food items to shoppers. In 1993, Bradlees added Pizza Hut, Taco Bell, and Dunkin' Donuts items to some of the stores that did not have snack stands and new stores constructed during this time.

Bradlees was known for its TV and print ads featuring the character "Mrs. B." (played by actress Cynthia Harris), depicted as the chain's buyer, who constantly searched for bargains to pass on to her customers. The advertising jingle went, "At Bradlees, you buy what Mrs. B buys. And nobody can buy like Mrs. B."

In 1988, its parent company Stop & Shop was involved in a hostile takeover bid by Herbert Haft's Dart Group. The board of directors appointed Kohlberg Kravis Roberts & Company to acquire the company shortly after, the deal was completed in 1989, with Stop & Shop becoming a private company.

=== Bankruptcy and closure ===
The final Bradlees logo and slogan before its 2001 bankruptcy and closure

The first major Bradlees store closings came in 1988, when it exited the Southern United States. Bradlees remained profitable into the early 1990s. In 1992, a year after its parent company becoming public once again, Stop & Shop Inc. sold Bradlees to an investment group and the chain continued as a separate company. By 1994, the company was unprofitable after attempting to open several new stores in New Jersey and New York. After losing money for 2 years, Bradlees filed for Chapter 11 bankruptcy in June 1995 and closed down some underperforming stores, (including its only two stores in Rhode Island) in 1996; some of these were turned into Ames stores.

James Zamberlan, previously senior vice president of Lazarus Department Stores, was appointed as executive vice president of Bradlees on August 25, 1995. Sales for the first nine months of 1996 were $1.156 billion (~$2.35 by June 2025); losses continued for $159 million. The company successfully emerged from bankruptcy in February 1999 after making a decent profit through 1998 and early 1999. Bradlees also took advantage of the liquidation and closure of competitor Caldor shortly after its emergence from bankruptcy, and purchased several of its former stores.

The fortunes of Bradlees took a turn for the worse in 2000, and on December 26, 2000, the company announced a filing for Chapter 7 bankruptcy protection, and said that Bradlees would begin liquidation sales as soon as possible, ending business operations. Executives of Bradlees said it filed for bankruptcy protection because of a general economic downturn, including rising interest rates and higher gas and heating-oil prices that had left customers with less disposable income. The executives also said new competition, unseasonable weather in the first half of 2000, and the tightening of trade credit contributed to its inability to operate profitably.

In an interview just before the chain closed, analyst Eric Beder of Ladenburg Thalmann & Co. said, "They really needed a perfect economy to get this thing moved", referring to the attempt at recovery after the restructuring of the company. "But the recent consumer spending slowdown did not facilitate that environment", he said.

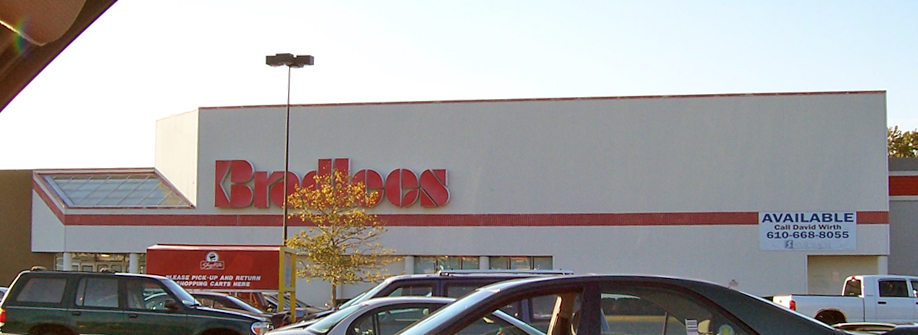
A vacant West Deptford, NJ Bradlees store in 2007, this was a former Jefferson Ward location that Montgomery Ward sold to Bradlees when they decided to discontinue the chain. This location space is now occupied by multiple stores.

In early January 2001, the chain started their liquidation sales, and the final store closed on March 15, 2001. At the time of its liquidation, the company had 10,000 employees and 105 stores in seven states. Many of its former store locations were purchased by Walmart, although other locations became Big Lots, Staples, Super Buy Rite, The Home Depot, Forman Mills, Shaw's Star Market, Target, Kohl's, Burlington Coat Factory, Ocean State Job Lot, Bob's Stores, Marshalls, Dollar Tree, ShopRite, National Wholesale Liquidators, or Stop & Shop. Stop & Shop owned much of its real estate even after it spun off the company. Stop & Shop was acquired by Ahold in 1996, and some former Bradlees were sold to other Ahold divisions, such as Giant.

When the Nasdaq stock market suspended trading in Bradlees stock, it closed at just under 22 cents.
