= Charles M. Egan =

American politician

Charles Michael Egan (October 13, 1877 – November 14, 1955) was an American attorney and Democratic party politician who served in the New Jersey General Assembly and New Jersey Senate between 1911 and 1917, and served as Vice-Chancellor of the New Jersey Chancery Court.

== Biography ==
Egan was born on October 13, 1877, in Jersey City, New Jersey, to Michael and Maria Egan. He attended St. Michael's School, Public School 21, and Saint Peter's College. Egan attended the New York Law School and was admitted to the bar in 1899. First elected to the New Jersey General Assembly in 1911, Egan rose to be Majority Leader in 1913. That year he sought to represent Hudson County in the New Jersey Senate. Egan won the election by 28,213 votes - the largest majority ever received for a county office in the state of New Jersey at the time. Egan was succeeded in the Senate by Cornelius Augustine McGlennon.

After leaving the Legislature, Egan served as an Assistant Hudson County Prosecutor, and in March 1923 Governor George Sebastian Silzer nominated him as a Judge of the Court of Common Pleas for Hudson County. On January 11, 1934, New Jersey State Chancellor Luther A. Campbell appointed Egan to succeed John J. Fallon as Vice-Chancellor of the State Chancery Court. Egan served in that position until his retirement in 1948. Egan was recognized with an Honorary Doctor of Laws degree by Saint Peter's College in 1935.

Egan was married to the former Eleanor Walsh, daughter of Congressman James J. Walsh of New York. The couple had three children - Charles M. Jr., James W., and Virginia. Egan died November 14, 1955, at the age of 78.
