= National Wholesale Liquidators =

- Type: Private
- Industry: Discount stores
- Founded: 1984
- Founder: Eva Rosen
- Headquarters: Brooklyn, New York, United States
- Area served: Eastern and Midwestern United States
- Website: http://www.nwl.me

National Wholesale Liquidators is a Brooklyn, New York-based company that operates warehouse-style closeout discount stores. It offers a mix of brand-name items, everyday household items, and furniture. National Wholesale Liquidators carries over 120,000 items. The company also offers appliances, automotive products, bath towels, bedding, carpets and floor covers, detergents and cleaning products, electrical hardware, electronics, food products, furniture outdoor, giftware, health and beauty aids, holiday decorative, and household storage products. In addition, it offers indoor furniture, jewelry, kitchen towels-linens, luggage, men's apparel and fragrances, paint and sundries, paper goods and supplies, personal umbrellas, pet supplies, sporting goods, vacuums and accessories, video games, and women's fragrances.

At its peak, the company operated more than 50 stores in Connecticut, Delaware, Illinois, Maryland, Massachusetts, New Jersey, New York, Pennsylvania, Rhode Island, Virginia, and Washington, D.C. The chain filed for Chapter 11 bankruptcy in November 2008. and, following a bankruptcy court auction, moved to close 35 of its 45 stores in December 2008. The Chapter 11 reorganization was converted to Chapter 7 liquidation on February 26, 2009. Some of NWL's assets were acquired out of bankruptcy by NSC Wholesale Holdings Inc., operated by former NWL executives. As of February 2018, NWL operated 12 retail locations in Massachusetts, New Jersey, New York, and Pennsylvania.

The company filed for bankruptcy again in October 2018 and closed its 11 remaining stores. A group of former managers purchased the name and intellectual property, and opened two stores: its longtime location in Brooklyn and the previous incarnation's location in Philadelphia, Pennsylvania, in a former Kmart, in early 2019. The company opened an additional store on Long Island in Massapequa, NY (a former Toys R Us) in November, 2019.

== External links and further reading ==
- National Wholesale Liquidators website at nwl.me
- "National Wholesale Liquidators company profile". Business Week. Archived from the original on August 29, 2012.
- "Discount_chain_hit_by_credit_crunch_kiss". New York Daily News. January 20, 2009. Archived from the original on January 24, 2009.
