= Shopko =

Defunct chain of retail stores

Shopko Stores, Inc.
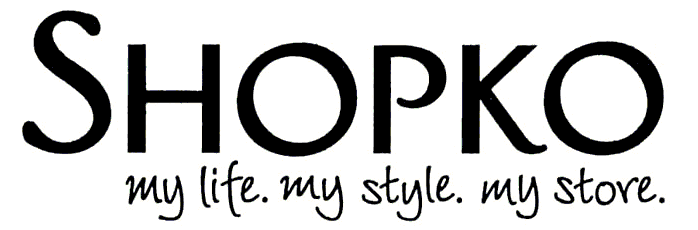

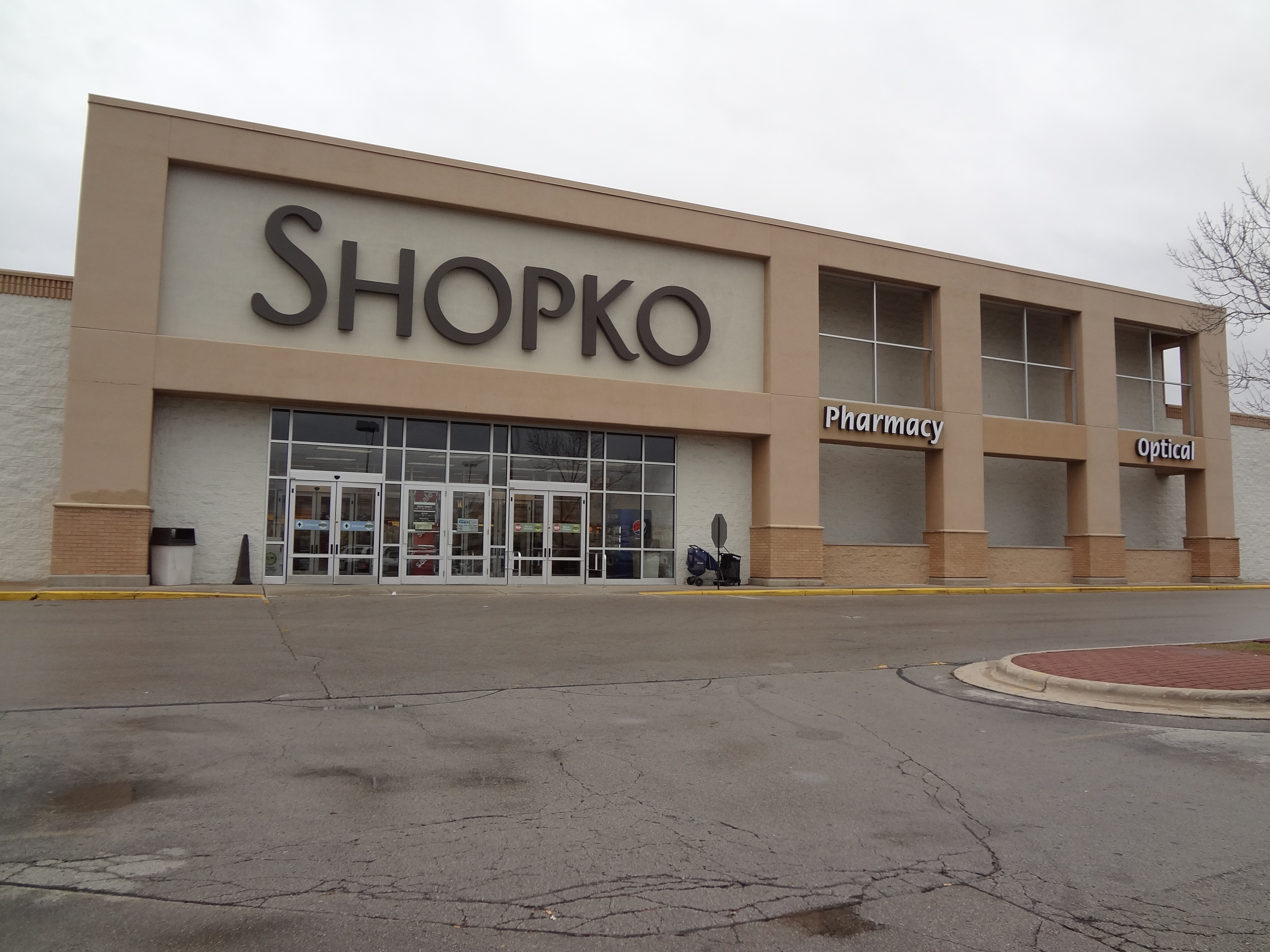
- Former Shopko Store
- Type: Private
- Industry: Retail
- Founded: April 5, 1962; 64 years ago (as ShopKo)
- Founder: James Ruben
- Defunct: June 23, 2019; 7 years ago
- Fate: Bankruptcy
- Successor: Shopko Optical
- Headquarters: Green Bay, Wisconsin, U.S.
- Area served: United States
- Products: Clothing, footwear, bedding, furniture, jewelry, beauty products, electronics, market, housewares, contact lenses.
- Revenue: ▲US$ 3.3 billion (FY 2018)
- Number of employees: 18,000 (2018)
- Website: Shopko.com at the Wayback Machine (archived January 5, 2019)

Shopko Stores, Inc. (stylized as SHOPKO, formerly stylized as ShopKo) was a chain of department stores based in Green Bay, Wisconsin. All locations closed on June 23, 2019, with the exception of the Shopko Optical locations, which continue to operate.

The company was founded in 1962 by James Ruben as ShopKo Corporation (with upper-case "K"). It opened its first store in 1962 in Green Bay, Wisconsin.

From 1991 to 2005, the company was publicly held, with stock traded on the New York Stock Exchange under the symbol SKO. In December 2005, the company was acquired by an affiliate of Sun Capital Partners and reverted to private ownership. Starting that year it opened a number of smaller stores named ShopKo Express. In June 2007, the company changed its name to Shopko Stores Inc. (with lower-case "k").

In 1999, Shopko purchased Pamida, a regional discount chain that operated mainly in smaller communities of 3,000 to 8,000 people. Shopko operated Pamida as a separate division until 2007, when Pamida was separated from Shopko and reestablished as a separate company. In 2012, Shopko and Pamida merged into one company. Shortly after, most Pamida stores were rebranded as Shopko Hometown.

Shopko filed for Chapter 11 bankruptcy on January 16, 2019. On March 18, 2019, Shopko announced it would close all of its stores by summer 2019. All stores ceased operations on June 23, 2019.

== History ==
=== 1960s ===
In March 1961, Chicago pharmacist James Ruben and other investors announced the formation of a corporation to open a $1 million (equivalent to $8.24 million in 2025) department store in Green Bay, Wisconsin, to be called "Shopco".

The store was opened in April 1962 at 216 S. Military Avenue; by that time, the spelling of the name had been changed to "ShopKo", and the company had been registered as "ShopKo Corporation" ShopKo became one of the first chains to offer such services as a pharmacy and eye care center within the store.

In 1966, a second store "ShopKo East" was opened on Main Street, in Green Bay's east side, followed by several other locations in the state in the following years.

In September 1969, the first ShopKo store in Michigan opened, in Marquette.

=== 1970s ===
In June 1970, Ruben announced plans for corporate headquarters on Ashland Avenue in Ashwaubenon, Wisconsin. In that same month, ShopKo Corp. was renamed "ShopKo Stores, Inc."

In January 1971, the firm announced plans to merge with SuperValu of Minneapolis.

Also in 1971, the new Ashwaubenon headquarters opened. The merger with SuperValu was completed in April 1971. In August 1971, ShopKo announced plans to open pharmacies in its stores.

In September 1972, Ruben left the company to become president of SuperValu, and William Tyrrell succeeded him.

In 1977, ShopKo topped $100 million in sales (equivalent to $414 million in 2025). Starting in 1978, ShopKo included optical centers in some stores.

=== 1980s ===
In 1983–1985, ShopKo opened a few new locations in a few converted former Copps Department Stores, including Fond du Lac, Wisconsin, and Fort Atkinson, Wisconsin. This was in response to Copps refocusing their efforts on their supermarket business and to make it less of a prime target for shoplifting. In 1988, a new corporate headquarters opened in Ashwaubenon by the Bay Park Square Mall.The company hit $1 billion (equivalent to $2.35 billion in 2025) in sales on the strength of 87 stores in 1988.

In February 1989, ShopKo and SuperValu introduce Twin Valu, a hypermarket concept, in Cuyahoga Falls, Ohio, combining the general merchandise of ShopKo with the grocery selection of Cub Foods.

=== 1990s ===
ShopKo logo used from December 1991 to May 2007

In 1990, ShopKo opened its 100th store, including its first venture in California.

In mid-1991, SuperValu announced that ShopKo would become a publicly traded company. The stock debuted at $15 (~$37.00 in 2025) a share. Dale Kramer also took over the reins of the company in 1991.

In late 1991, ShopKo introduced a "Vision 2000" prototype model, which opened in Sheboygan, Wisconsin; Duluth, Minnesota; Dixon, Illinois; Loveland, Colorado; Longmont, Colorado; and Lacey, Washington, and relocated stores in Marshall, Minnesota and Mitchell, South Dakota. The construction of the Sheboygan store was affected by the collapse of an exterior wall that killed a stonemason, and the store opened with a memorial stone and flagpole overlooking the valley below dedicated in his honor.

In 1996, ShopKo announced plans to merge with Phar-Mor, an Ohio-based chain, but those plans were later called off.

Also in 1997, Phar-Mor split from ShopKo, and ShopKo bought all of SuperValu's stock in the company. ShopKo was among the first retailers in the nation to halt all tobacco sales permanently in the same year.

In 1998 the company acquired Venture Stores in Kentucky, Iowa, Missouri, Illinois and Kansas.

In 1999, William Podany became President of ShopKo. He led the acquisition of 147 Pamida stores later that year. ShopKo also launched spin-off pharmaceutical company ProVantage on to the stock market.

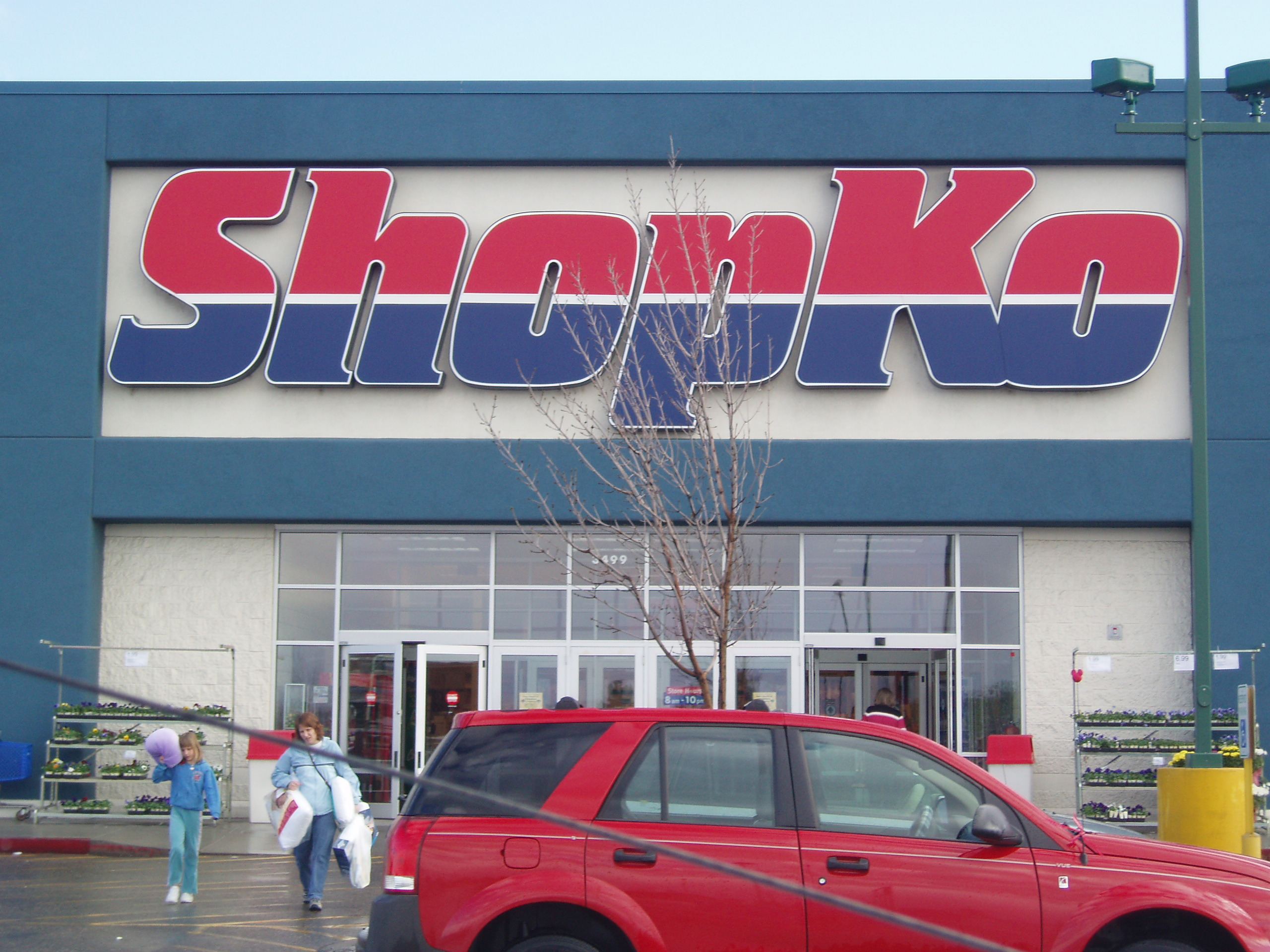
The 1999 "Beyond 2000" prototype store in Meridian, Idaho, in April 2006 (closed in February 2017). This building now houses an Albertsons Market Street supermarket.

Late in 1999, ShopKo opened its first test prototype store in Meridian, Idaho, named "Beyond 2000," referring to ShopKo's Beyond 2000 merchandising strategy, the successor to the Vision 2000 strategy of the early 1990s.

=== 2000s ===
In March 2000, shares of ShopKo hit a record $3.57, (~$7.00 in 2025) up 70% from the year before. Later that year, the firm announced that it would sell ProVantage to Merck & Co. for about $222 million.In May 2000, ShopKo agreed to buy P.M. Place Stores, a 49-location chain, for $22 million (equivalent to $39 million in 2025), with plans to convert those locations to Pamidas.

Early in 2001, ShopKo announced the closings of 23 stores and a distribution center, cutting 2,500 jobs and bowing out of Missouri, Indiana, Kansas, and Kentucky.

In April 2002 the company's CEO, William Podany, resigned. Jeffrey Girard became his interim replacement, until Sam Duncan took over in October.

In 2005, ShopKo opened the first few "ShopKo Express" locations, which were smaller, and aimed at competition with Walgreens and CVS Pharmacy. Around that time, the chain exited the state of Colorado, and closed its Reno, Nevada locations. JCPenney acquired some of the Colorado locations.

Late in 2005, ShopKo was acquired by Sun Capital Partners.

In May 2006, Michael MacDonald took over as CEO.

In 2007, Pamida spun off from ShopKo.

Also in 2007, ShopKo rebranded, dropping the capital camel case "K" in its name and introducing a new logo., but Shopko Express stores retained the older style until fall 2008.

In 2008, Shopko Express expanded into urban markets with the opening of a Green Bay, Wisconsin location, but this store was shuttered less than a year after it was opened.

During the late 2000s, Shopko started to anchor more shopping centers, such as the ones in Suamico, Wisconsin and North Branch, Minnesota.

In April 2009, Michael MacDonald resigned as CEO, to become CEO of DSW, Inc., and was replaced by W. Paul Jones.

In late 2009, Shopko started online shopping service.

=== 2010s ===
In May 2010, Shopko outsourced its IT services to HCL Technologies, based in Chennai, India.

In the summer of 2010, Shopko opened its first two "Shopko Hometown" stores, which were converted from Pamida locations.

In 2011, Shopko placed even more emphasis on its Hometown subsidiary, opening nine new locations and closing regular stores to focus on the Hometown stores.

In 2012, a decade after it spun off from Shopko, Pamida merged with Shopko; all Pamida stores were rebranded as Shopko Hometown stores. The total cost for the remodel was estimated at $80 million.

Later in 2012, W. Paul Jones resigned from the company's top post and Mike Bettiga took over as interim CEO.

In 2013, Peter McMahon was named Shopko's new CEO.

In 2015, due to bankruptcy, Shopko acquired 20 ALCO Stores locations with the plan of converting them to Hometown locations. Shopko also changed its slogan to "The Stuff that Counts".

Late in 2016, Shopko closed four stores due to poor sales but also opened one in Ely, Nevada.

In November 2016 Shopko launched its first credit card.

In late 2016 and early 2017 the firm also remodeled its larger stores to include some groceries, with limited frozen and perishable goods (mainly frozen pizza and dairy products).

=== Chapter 11 and liquidation ===
On December 4, 2018 Shopko confirmed that it was closing 39 stores. The following day, Bloomberg reported that Sun Capital had failed to find a buyer for Shopko and that the capital partners found a Chapter 11 situation increasingly likely.

Shopko began closing its pharmacies in December 2018 and selling its patient records to local competitors including Walgreens, CVS, Hy-Vee and Kroger. On January 8, 2019, McKesson Corporation filed a suit against Shopko, seeking $67 million (equivalent to $83.1 million in 2025) in delinquent payments. Along with the announcement, it was reported that Shopko could file for bankruptcy as early as January 15. On January 16, 2019, Shopko filed for Chapter 11 bankruptcy in Nebraska court, citing tough market competition and assets of less than $1 billion compared to liabilities of up to $10 billion (equivalent to $12.4 billion in 2025). Shopko also announced the closure of another 105 of its 363 stores, including its original Military Ave. store in Green Bay.

On February 7, 2019, Shopko confirmed the closure of 251 stores or 70 percent of its locations closing in phases between March 2, 2019 and May 12, 2019. The list included 77 Shopko stores, 165 Hometown Values stores, both the 2 standalone pharmacies, and all 7 Express stores. Shopko will exit the states of California, Colorado, Indiana, Kansas, Kentucky, Nevada, New Mexico, Ohio, Oklahoma, Oregon, Texas, Utah, and Washington.

On March 18, 2019, Shopko announced the closure of all remaining stores, after being unable to find a buyer for the chain. Liquidation sales ran through the summer.

On April 22, 2019, Shopko announced to employees that despite the fact that the company signed a contract for severance pay, only certain states would actually be paid. In April 2019, Monarch Alternative Capital LP purchased Shopko's optical operations for $8.5 million (equivalent to $10.5 million in 2025). The optical centers continued to operate inside the otherwise-shuttered store locations until smaller locations could be found. Shopko Optical was later acquired by the German optical group Fielmann AG.

Several former Shopko locations have been repurposed. The former Shopko Hometowns in St. Peter and New Prague, Minnesota have become Hy-Vee supermarkets. A former Shopko in Mankato, Minnesota was converted into a mixed-use space intended to house a restaurant, indoor ice rink, and indoor event center which opened in 2023. Several former locations were bought by Hy-Vee and converted into their Dollar Fresh Market subsidiary.

== Organization ==
=== Shopko ===
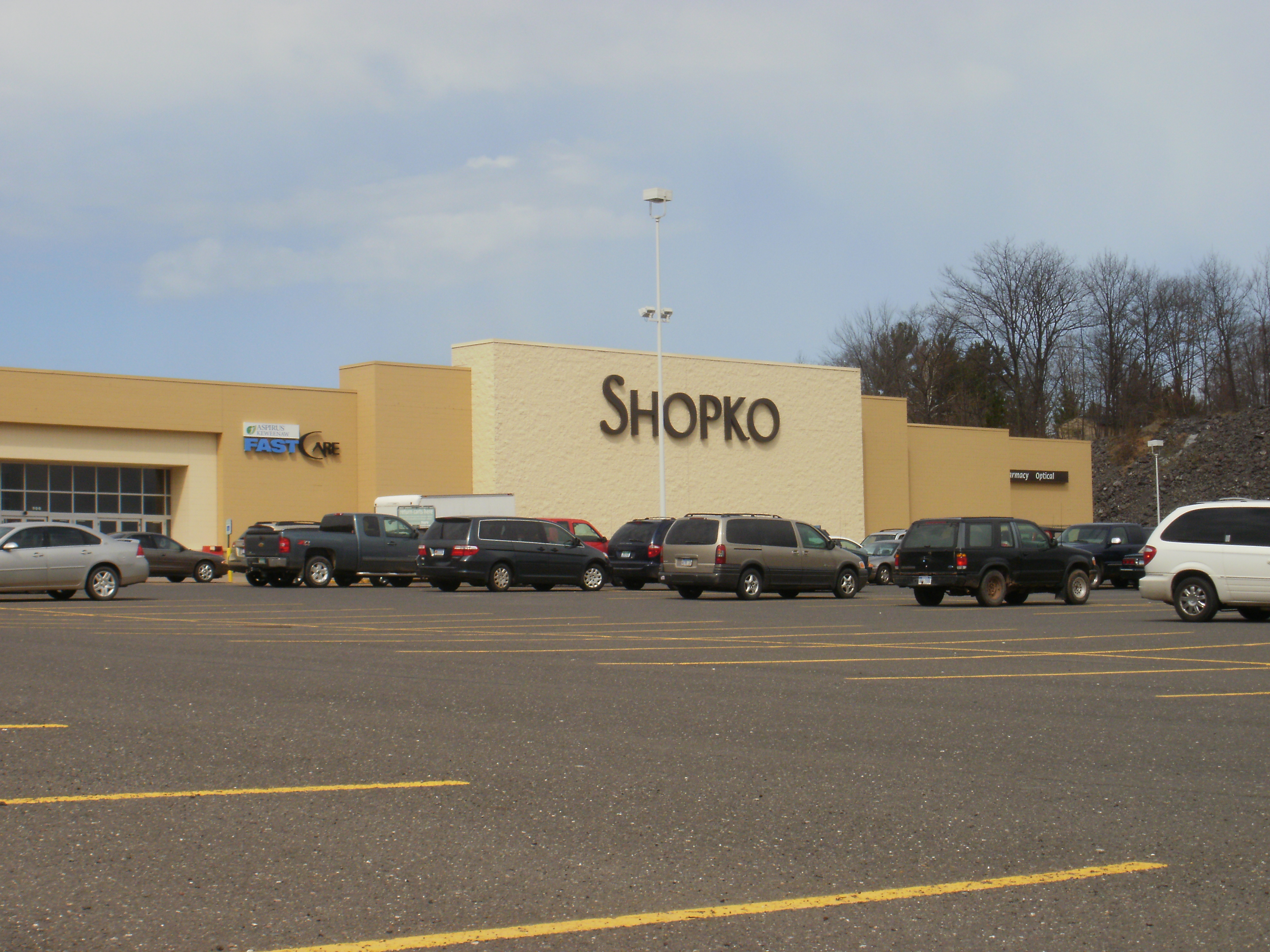
Store facade at Houghton, Michigan, location in April 2012. This location closed on May 11, 2019.

The first Shopko store in Green Bay, Wisconsin, and the marker commemorating its status, both taken in August 2009. This location closed on April 22, 2019.

By the time it ceased operations, the company operated 363 stores in 24 states including, but not limited to, California, Iowa, Idaho, Illinois, Indiana, Kansas, Kentucky, Michigan, Minnesota, Missouri, Montana, Nebraska, Nevada, North Dakota, Ohio, Oregon, South Dakota, Utah, Washington, Wisconsin, and Wyoming. Stores were typically placed in small to mid-sized communities. Most Shopko stores were located in strip malls, shopping malls, power centers, or freestanding locations. Shopko, with partnerships from Green Bay, Wisconsin-based Bellin Health and other local hospitals, also operated walk-in clinics inside its stores called FastCare.

Past slogans include "Say hello to a good buy at ShopKo", "ShopKo discounts the price...not the quality.", "We won't be undersold.", "ShopKo: Discover for Yourself", "ShopKo - The Store for You.", "ShopKo - Your Lifestyle, Your Pricestyle.", "Shopko - Neat stuff, neat store." and "My life...my style...my store". Shopko's last slogan was "The Stuff that Counts", which was used from 2015 to 2019. The slogan for Shopko Express pharmacy was "Every day. On your way."

Karen McDiarmid was Shopko's spokesperson in the 1980s and 1990s.

Shopko sponsored the exhibition hall venue portion of the Brown County Veterans Memorial Arena/Resch Center complex, known as Shopko Hall. Unrelated to the bankruptcy in any case, Shopko Hall closed on April 28, 2019 with the BCVMA and was demolished, and was replaced with a new expo hall known as the Resch Expo.

== Subsidiaries ==
=== Shopko Express ===
Shopko Express (stylized as Shopko EXP℞ESS) was a chain of pharmacies owned by Shopko. Shopko Express carried a limited selection of general merchandise, groceries, beer, wine, health and beauty supplies, and over-the-counter medicines. Shopko Express also carried lottery tickets.

=== Shopko Hometown ===
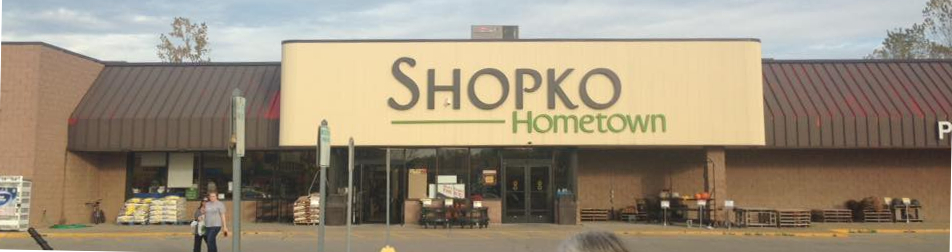
Shopko Hometown in Standish, Michigan, in October 2017. This location closed on March 17, 2019.

In 2012 Shopko acquired Pamida and all former Pamida locations then operated as Shopko Hometown stores. Shopko Hometown stores were aimed at smaller communities ranging from 3,000 to 8,000 in population. They carried about 70% of the merchandise of Shopko's larger stores. The first two stores opened in 2010 in Oconto, Wisconsin and Kewaunee, Wisconsin inside converted Pamida locations. In 2015, 20 locations were acquired from the bankrupt ALCO Stores chain, and were converted into Shopko Hometown stores.

=== Payless ShoeSource ===
In 1999, Shopko signed a contract with Payless ShoeSource, leasing the floorspace to the shoe chain within Shopko stores with prominent front signage, replacing the previous contract with J. Baker, Inc. as the retailer in charge of the discount shoe department. The changeover was completed by late June 2000. After filing for bankruptcy for the second time in February 2019, Payless ShoeSource coincidentally closed its stores at the same time Shopko was also closing.

=== Private-label brands ===
Shopko sold an assortment of private-label store-brand products, primarily in apparel and general merchandise. Popular brands included Shopko, Willow Bay, Bailey's Point, NorthCrest, Energy Zone, Soft Sensations, Peanut & Ollie and Green Soda.

== Acquisitions ==
- Shopko
  - Copps Department Store (Copps Department Stores were the forerunners to the current superstore concept, carrying groceries and general merchandise. When Copps, the Stevens Point, Wisconsin-based retailer, left the general merchandise half of the retail business to focus on selling groceries through their Copps Food Center chain in 1983, many former Copps Department Store locations were converted to ShopKo, as well as other retailers, including ShopKo's discount store rivals Prange Way, Kmart and Woolco, as well as Wisconsin-based home improvement retailer Menards.)
  - Penn-Daniels/Jack's
  - Venture (most locations; by the end, only the former Dubuque, Iowa, location remained operating at the time of Shopko's closure.)
  - Parade Stores
  - PayLess Discount Stores
  - The former Kmart store in Wenatchee, Washington.
- Shopko Hometown
  - Pamida
  - ALCO
  - P.M. Place/Place's

== Distribution ==
Distribution and transportation was managed by Spectrum America Supply Chain Solutions, a subsidiary of Metro Supply Chain group created in 2016. Shopko's distribution centers were located in De Pere, Wisconsin; Omaha, Nebraska; Quincy, Illinois; and Boise, Idaho.

== See also ==
- ALCO Stores
- P.M. Place Stores
- Phar-Mor
- SuperValu
- Twin Valu
- Venture
