= Bay Park =

Bay Park may refer to:

- Bay Park, Michigan, an unincorporated community in Tuscola County
- Bay Park, New York, a hamlet (and census-designated place) in Nassau County
- Bay Park Square, a shopping mall in Ashwaubenon, Wisconsin
