= Clothier, West Virginia =

Unincorporated community in West Virginia, United States

- Unincorporated community
- Location within West Virginia Location within the United States
- Coordinates: 37°56′48″N 81°48′37″W
- Country: United States
- State: West Virginia
- County: Boone
- Elevation: 807 ft (246 m)
- Time zone: UTC-5 (Eastern (EST))
  - Summer (DST): UTC-4 (EDT)
- ZIP code: 25047
- Area codes: 304 & 681
- GNIS feature ID: 1554157

Clothier is an unincorporated community in Logan County, West Virginia, United States. Clothier is located along West Virginia Route 17, approximately 8 miles (13 km) south of Madison. Clothier has a post office with the ZIP code 25047.

Clothier was named after the proprietor of a coal mine.

In 1974, Jack Corn, a DOCUMERICA photographer, photographed Clothier and its inhabitants for a project on mining and its environmental and health consequences. The images are available at Wikimedia Commons.

== Notable people ==
- Fred Haddad, co-founder and president of Heck's discount retail chain

== Gallery ==
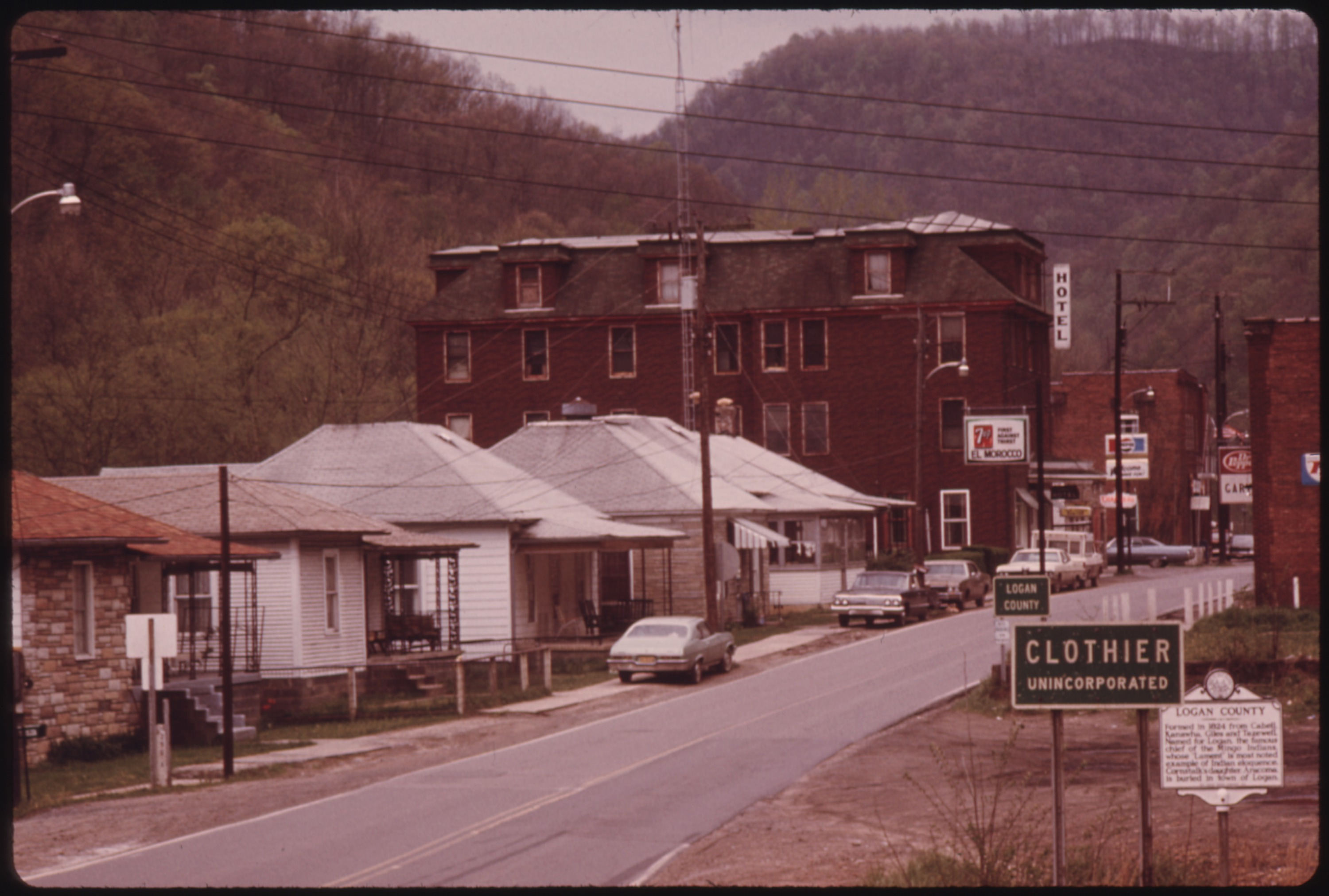
Clothier, West Virginia (1974)

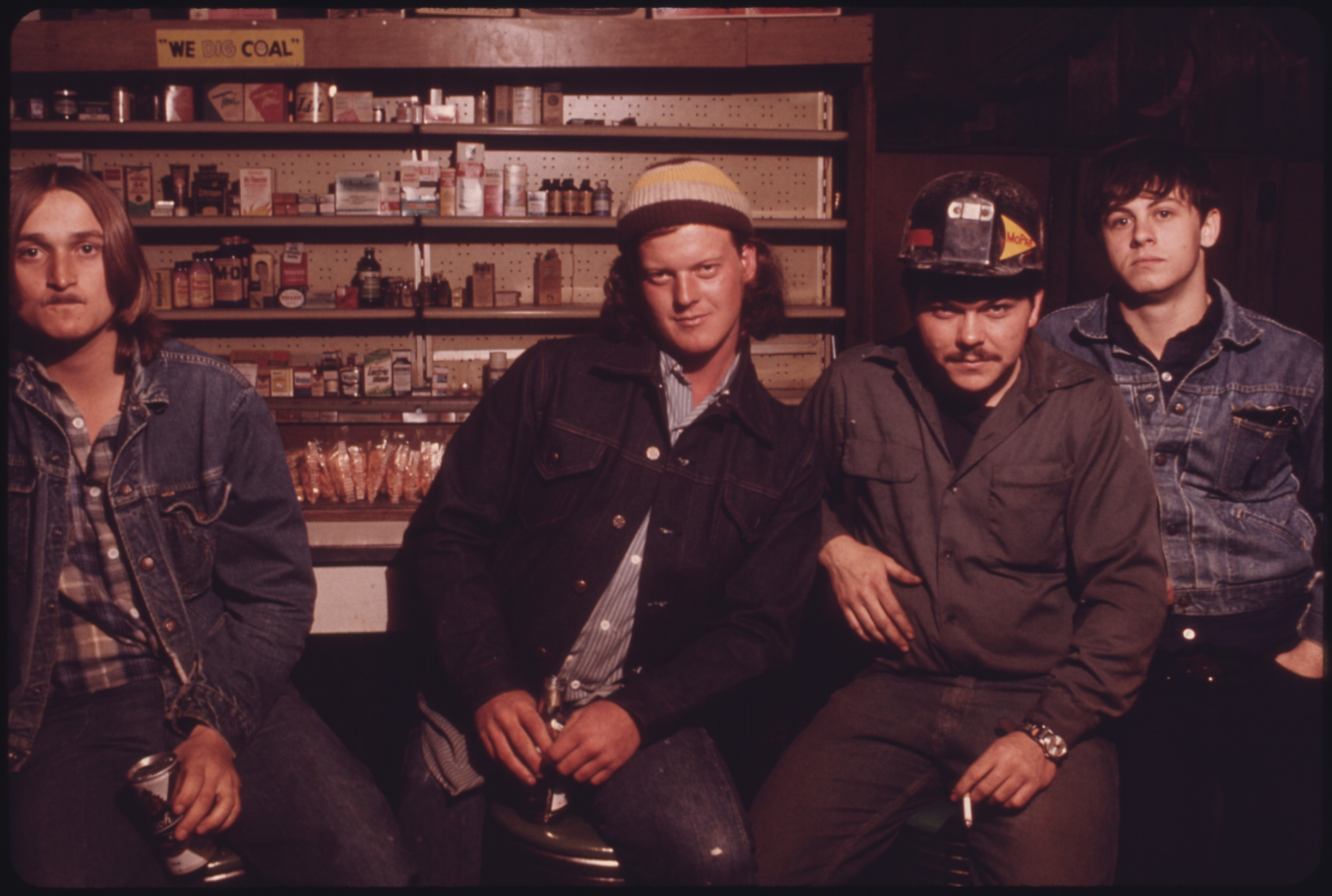
Four young men from Clothier

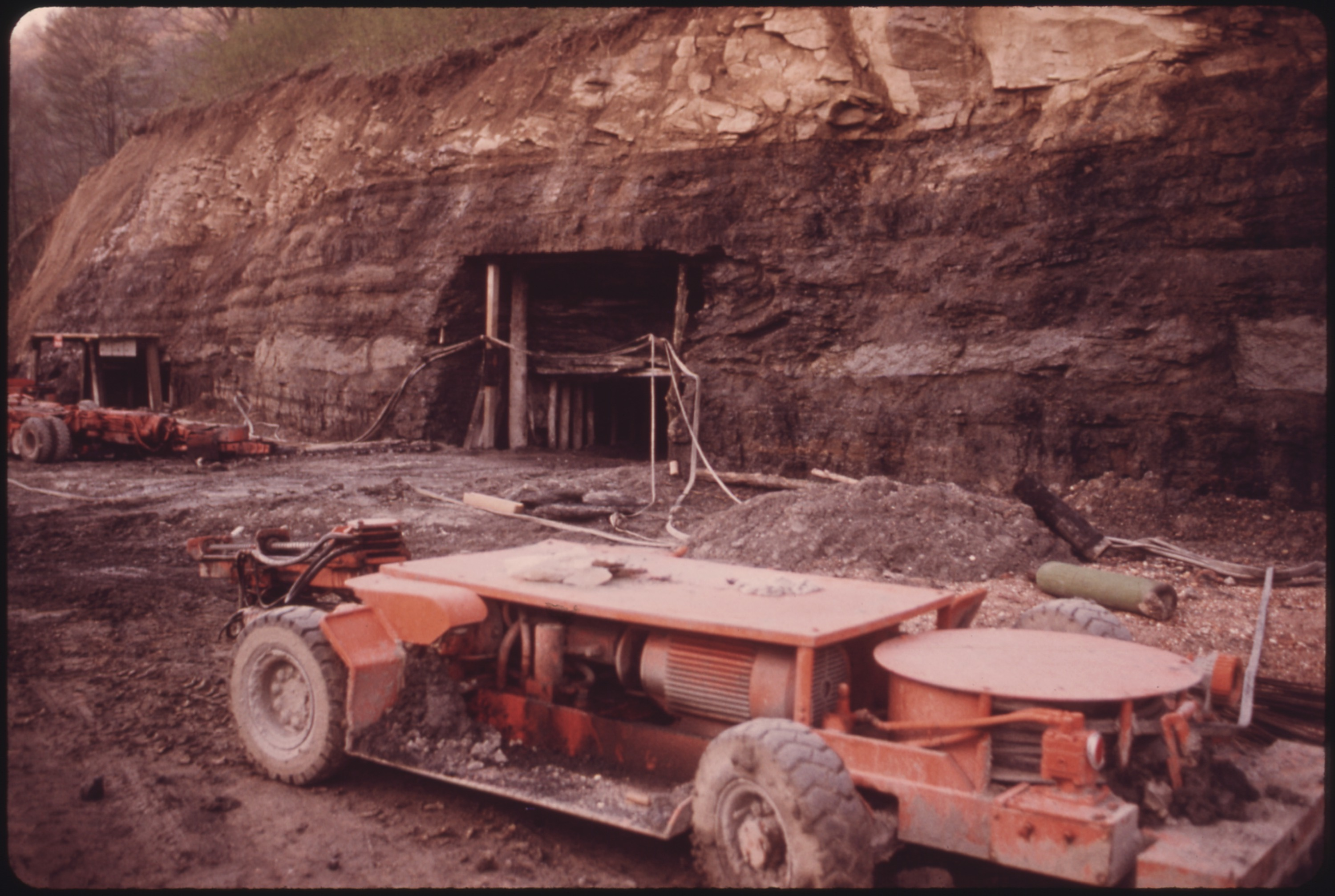
The new Robin Mine

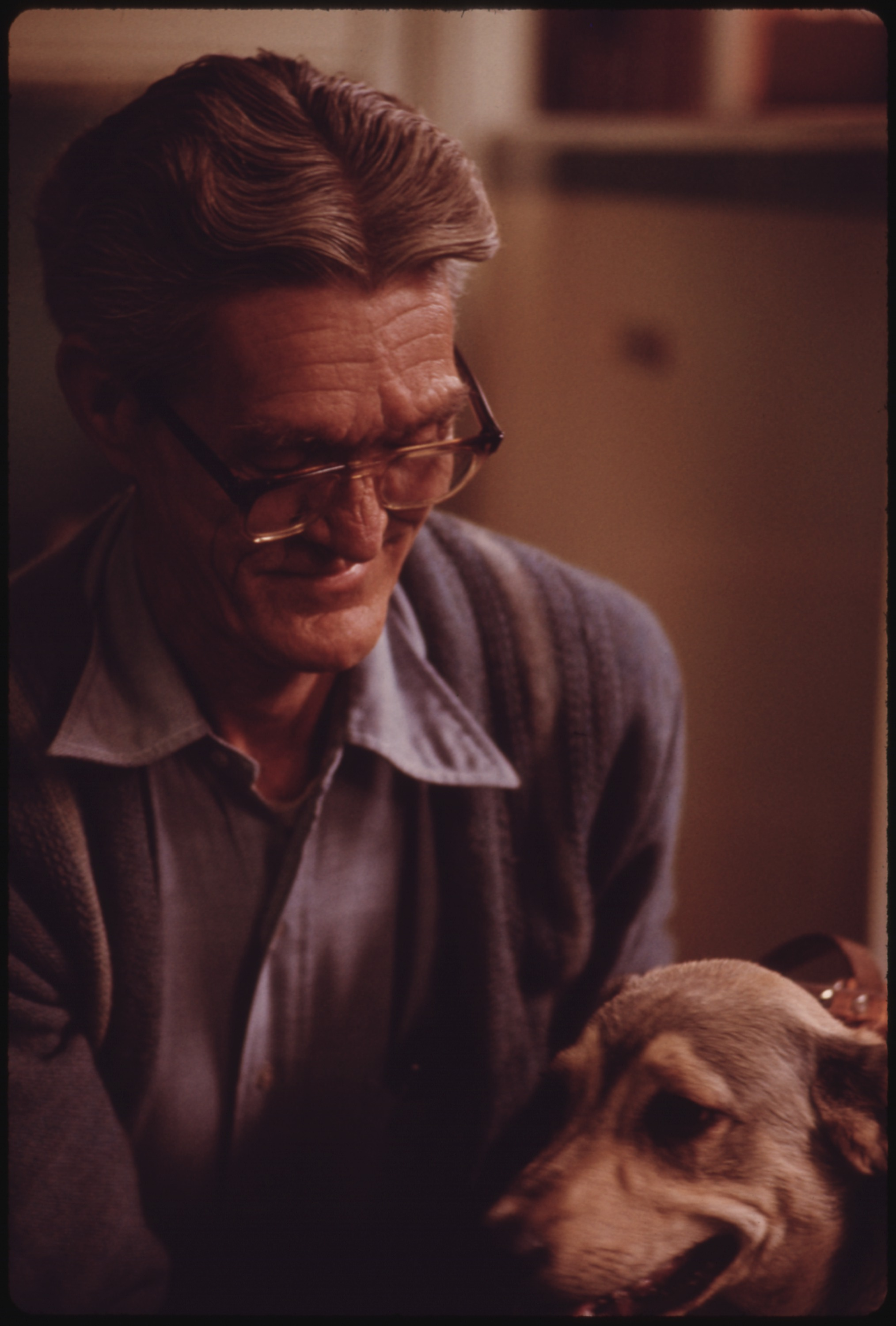
Miner with black lung disease
