= Pamida =

Defunct American department store chain

- Type: Private
- Industry: Retail
- Founded: 1963
- Defunct: 2012
- Fate: Merged with Shopko
- Headquarters: Omaha, Nebraska, United States
- Number of locations: 175+
- Products: Clothing, footwear, bedding, furniture, jewelry, beauty products, electronics, market, housewares, pharmacy.
- Owner: Sun Capital Partners, Inc.

Pamida /pəˈmaɪdə/ was a chain of department stores with more than 175 locations in 16 Midwestern and West Central U.S. states. Founded by D.J. Witherspoon and Lee Wegener in 1963, Pamida stores were generally located in smaller, rural communities that ranged from 3,000 to 8,000 in population. The Pamida name represents the first two letters of the first names of co-founder D.J. (Jim) Witherspoon's three sons: Pat, Mike, and David.

== History ==
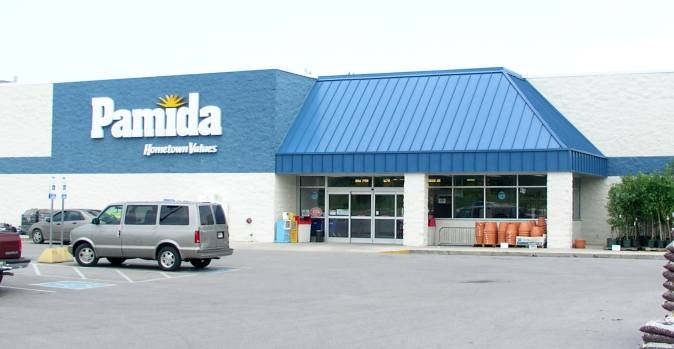
A typical Pamida store in Smithville, Tennessee.

Pamida had its beginnings in a rack jobber business begun in 1938 by Jim Witherspoon, a company that by 1948 became known as NuWay Drug Service. The acquisition by Witherspoon of a distribution business in 1962 brought Lee Wegener into the company, and Pamida Inc. was founded as a holding company for Witherspoon's businesses. In 1963, Witherspoon and Wegener opened their first discount retail outlet in Knoxville, Iowa. A second store soon followed in Oskaloosa, Iowa, and the stores quickly expanded throughout the Midwest, mostly as franchises of Gibson's Discount Center but also under other names. Pamida became a public company in 1969. Pamida eventually became the largest Gibson's franchisee, operating 74 stores. By the late 1970s, however, Pamida was withdrawing from the Gibson's franchise, emphasizing the building of larger stores in its established markets over expansion into new markets, and branding its stores under the Pamida name.

Witherspoon and Wegener sold Pamida in 1981 to employees, and in 1986 a unit of Citicorp acquired a controlling interest in the company. Several former Fisher's Big Wheel stores were also acquired in 1994. In 1999, Shopko Stores, Inc. purchased Pamida for $110 million (~$194 million in 2024), operating it as a separate division within Shopko. In 2000, Shopko acquired Missouri-based discounter P.M. Place Stores and converted the Place's locations into Pamida stores. In 2005, Shopko was purchased by an affiliate of Sun Capital Partners, Inc., a private investment firm. In 2007, Pamida was separated from Shopko, and subsequently reestablished its corporate headquarters in Omaha, Nebraska. On January 4, 2012, it was announced that Shopko and Pamida would merge and that Pamida's stores would be rebranded as Shopko Hometown stores. Seven Pamida stores, in Sparta, Michigan; Litchfield, Minnesota; Ontonagon, Michigan; Albia, Iowa; Chelsea, Michigan; Corydon, Iowa; and Mount Vernon, Missouri, were closed instead of converting to Shopko Hometown.

The Shopko Hometown stores closed in 2019 along with the rest of the chain with Shopko's bankruptcy and liquidation.

== Gallery ==
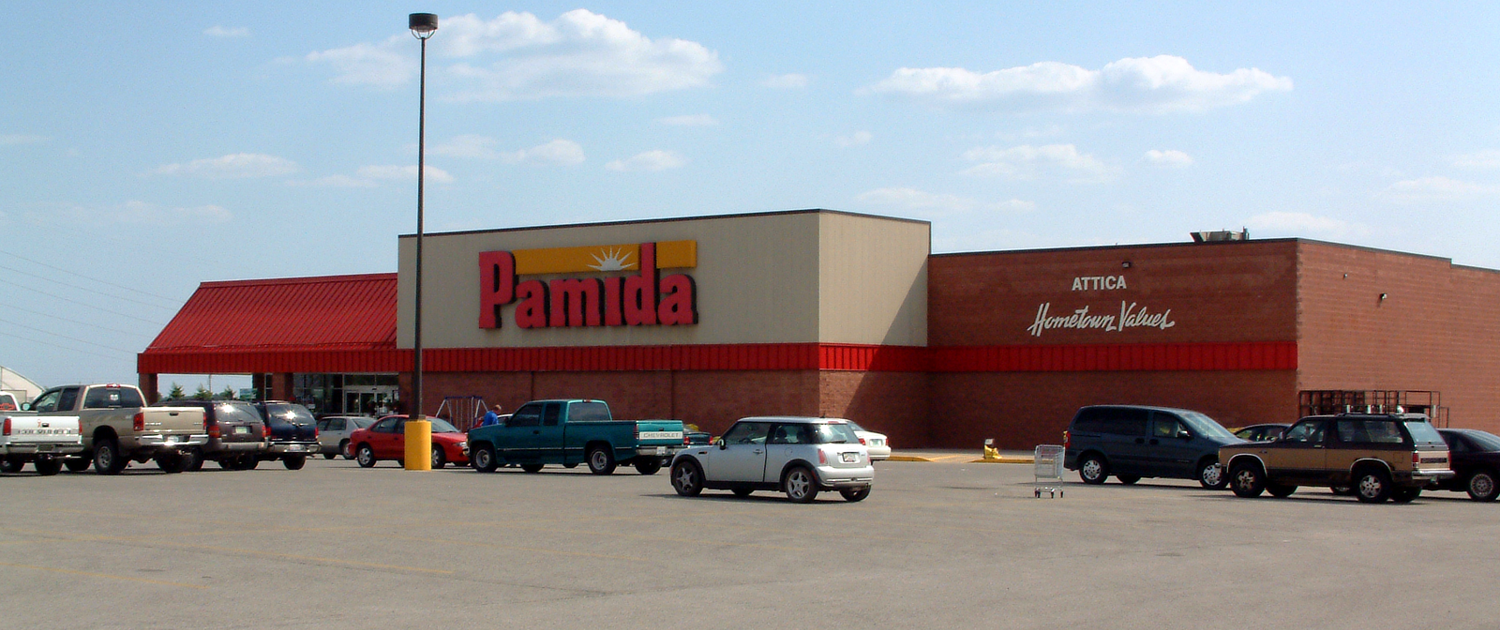
Pamida store in Attica, Indiana

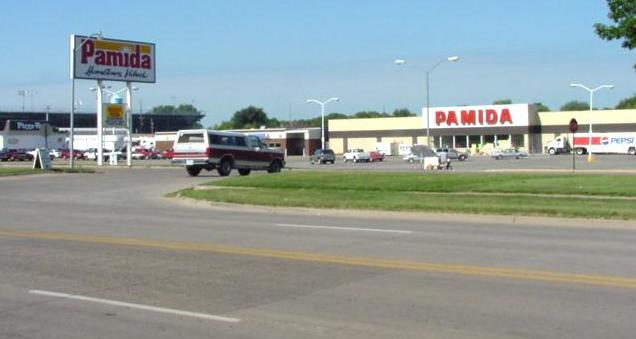
First Pamida Store (Knoxville, Iowa)
