= Twin Valu =

Defunct U.S. hypermarket

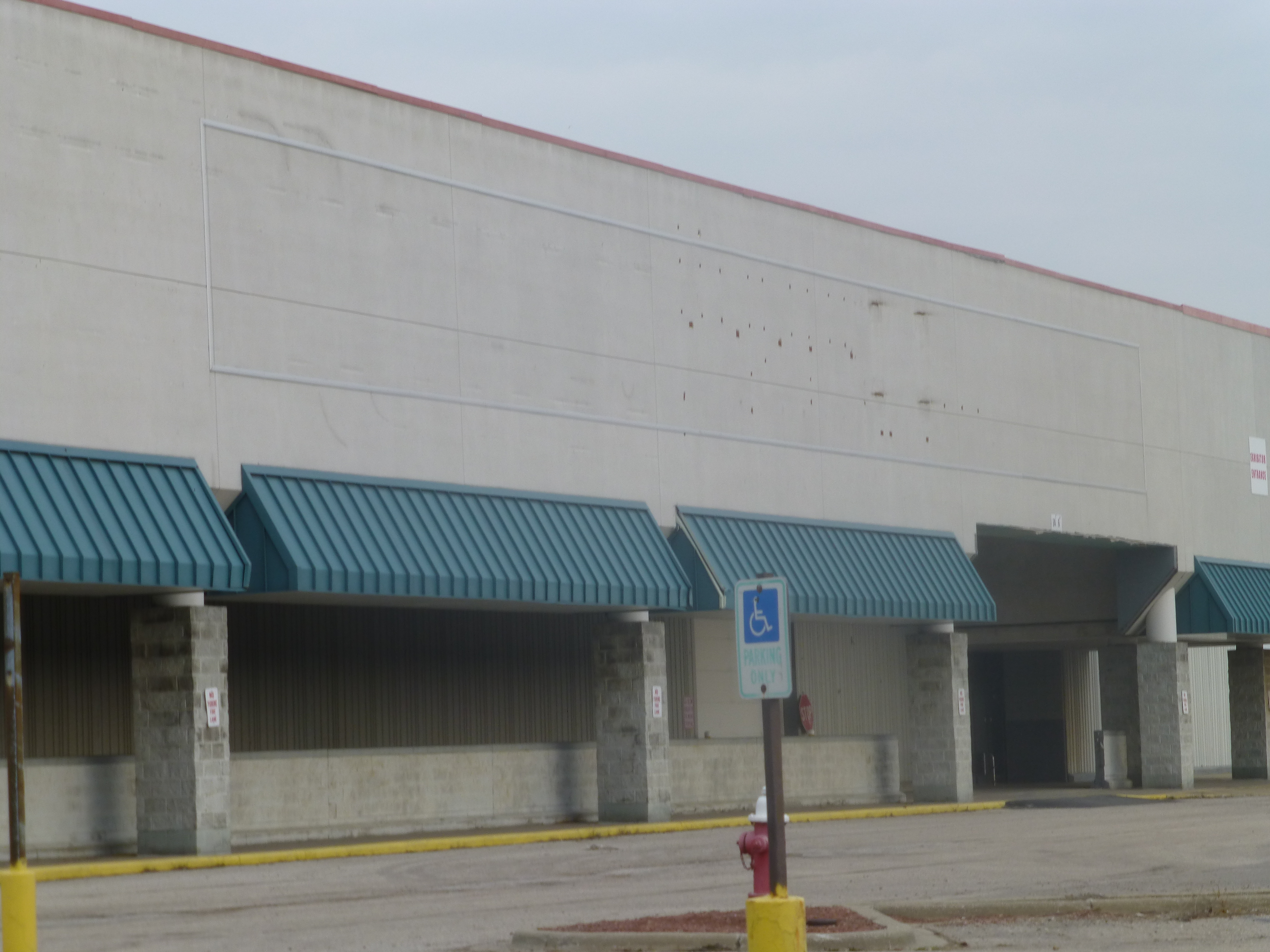
A former Twin Valu Hypermarket location in Euclid, Ohio: Both the Twin Valu and Super Kmart label-scars are still visible.

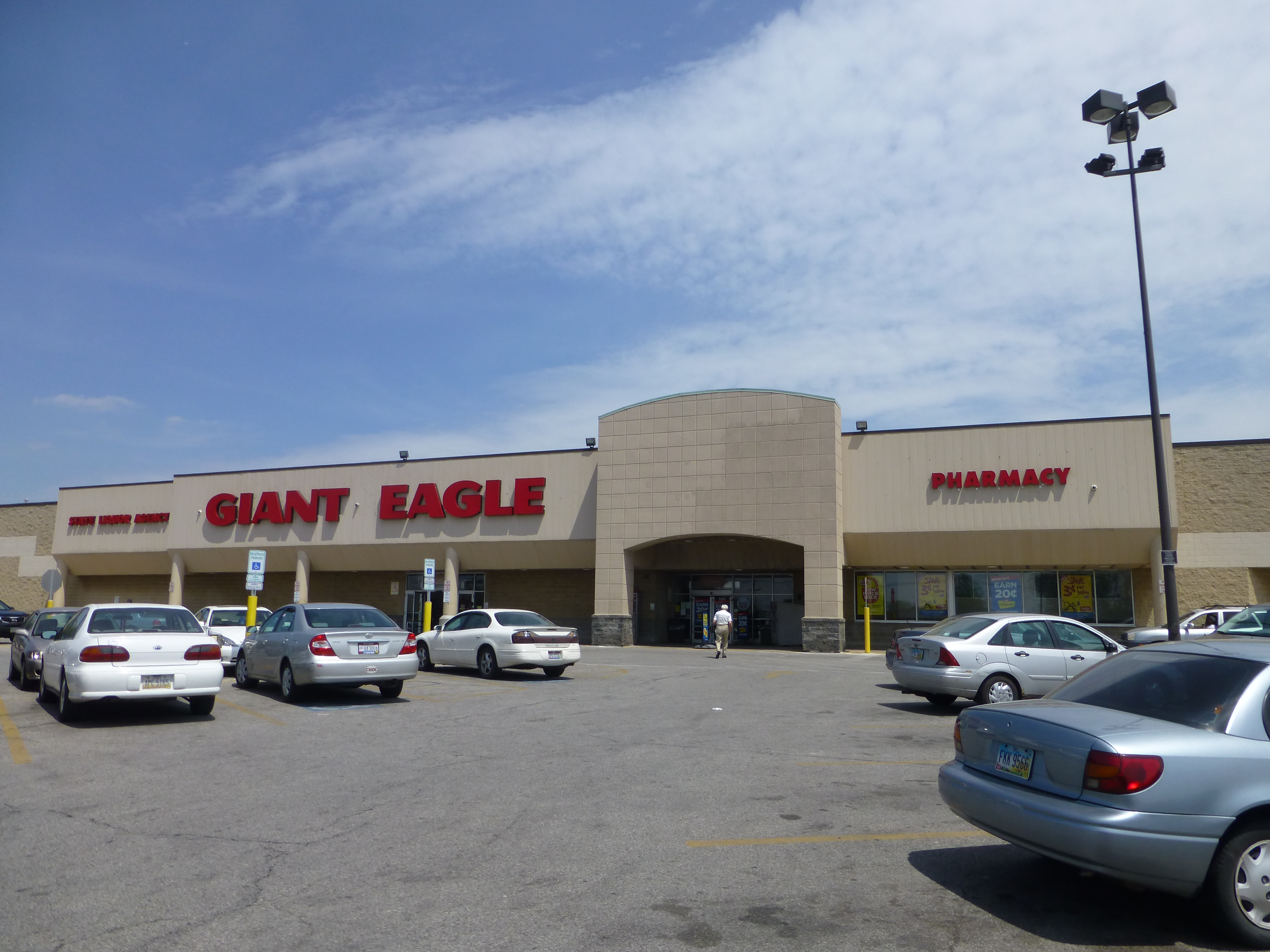
A former Twin Valu supermarket location in Maple Heights, Ohio: Despite later becoming Dave's Market then finally Giant Eagle, this store retains most of its look from Twin Valu.

Twin Valu was a U.S. hypermarket and was one of the first hypermarkets in the Akron, Ohio, area. The original Twin Valu store was located on Howe Avenue in Cuyahoga Falls, Ohio. The $10 million, 180,000-square-foot (17,000 m^{2}) store was open 24 hours a day, 7 days a week. It boasted 52 checkout lanes, a full bakery, deli, meat department, smokehouse, food court, floral department, jewelry department, electronics department, photo department, vision center, and pharmacy in addition to groceries, clothing, housewares, and general merchandise. A Star Bank branch location was added later.

The hypermarket opened to mass crowds and union pickets. Members of the UFCW Local 880 picketed the nonunion store.

The Cuyahoga Falls store opened on February 26, 1989, and closed on March 1, 1995. The building was sold and converted into a Target and Best Buy location.

A second location was opened in Euclid, Ohio, in 1990 and closed in 1995. The building became a Super Kmart around 1996, then closed in 2003. The building was briefly reopened as the Great Lakes Expo Center in 2009, which stole the Home and Garden Show from the IX Center in 2010. The concept failed and closed in 2011.

Grocery-only locations were in Maple Heights, Ohio, and Belden Village (Jackson Township, Ohio; the latter, previously a Zayre location (now home to Burlington Coat Factory) closed on January 16, 1996. Twin Valu was a division of Supervalu Inc and Shopko Stores Inc.

Television commercials for Twin Valu featured Phil Hartman as the spokesman.

== See also ==
- Cub Foods
