= Shopko Hall =

Former convention venue in Ashwaubenon, Wisconsin

- Interactive map of Shopko Hall
- Former names: Brown County Expo Center
- Address: 1901 S Oneida St, Ashwaubenon, Wisconsin
- Coordinates: 44°29′58″N 88°03′22″W
- Owner: Brown County
- Operator: PMI Entertainment Group

Construction
- Opened: 1986
- Closed: April 28, 2019
- Demolished: April 30, 2019

Shopko Hall was an exhibition hall in Ashwaubenon, Wisconsin, situated between the Brown County Veterans Memorial Arena and the Resch Center. Shopko Hall opened in 1986 as the Brown County Expo Center, with the naming rights being purchased by Shopko. It was owned by Brown County and operated by PMI Entertainment Group.

Based on the facility's age and needed maintenance requirements, the Brown County Board of Supervisors decided to replace the center and the connected Brown County Veterans Memorial Arena with a brand new $93 million Brown County Expo Center, set to open in 2021. The arena closed on April 6, 2019; Shopko Hall later closed after the Titletown Train Show on April 28, 2019. Demolition of the arena and Shopko Hall began on April 30, 2019. By coincidence, its naming rights sponsor Shopko began to wind down operations in March 2019 after filing chapter 11 bankruptcy.

== Events ==
Shopko Hall had 43,680 square feet (4058 m^{2}) of column-free exhibit space. It also featured an enclosed ticket office, a private show office, and concession stands, as well as walkways connecting it to the Brown County Veterans Memorial Arena and the Resch Center. The venue primarily hosted trade shows, conventions, seminars, banquets, and intimate concerts.

Shopko Hall hosted over 100 events every year, including the Titletown Train Show, Everybody's Rummage Sale, WBAY Pet Expo, WBAY RV & Camping Show, Home and Garden Show, and Senior Expo.

== See also ==
- Brown County Veterans Memorial Arena
- Resch Center
