= Haddad Riverfront Park =

American municipal park

- Haddad Riverfront Park, viewed from across the Kanawha River

- Location within West Virginia
- Location: 600 Kanawha Boulevard East; Charleston, Kanawha County, West Virginia, U.S.
- Coordinates: 38°20′56.9″N 81°38′18.2″W
- Designation: Municipal park
- Named for: Fred Haddad
- Owner: Charleston City Government Parks and Recreation

Haddad Riverfront Park is a municipal park along the Kanawha River in Charleston, Kanawha County in the U.S. state of West Virginia. It is named for Fred Haddad, a prominent Arab-American businessman from West Virginia.

== Geography and setting ==
Haddad Riverfront Park is a municipal park located between the Kanawha River and Kanawha Boulevard East, in downtown Charleston, West Virginia, between Court and Capitol Streets. The park is located near several prominent downtown Charleston landmark buildings, situated approximately 525 feet (160 m) south of Charleston City Hall, approximately 620 feet (190 m) south of the Kanawha County Courthouse, directly across Kanawha Boulevard from the Four Points by Sheraton–Charleston, and is to the immediate west of the Union Building. The Downtown Charleston Historic District on the National Register of Historic Places is located immediately to the park's northeast. The Unity Statue is situated in the park.

== History ==
In October 1994, the Charleston Festival Commission blamed the construction of Haddad Waterfront Park for the Charleston Sternwheel Regatta's $60,000 deficit in 1994 and the event's $75,000 deficit in 1993. The commission explained that attractions for the regatta had to be scaled back due to the construction.

The first major event to take place at Haddad Waterfront Park was an Independence Day fireworks display, ignited by Zambelli Fireworks, on July 4, 1995.
