= Fred Haddad =

American businessman

- Born: January 18, 1921; Boone County, West Virginia, US
- Died: January 13, 2003 (aged 81); Charleston, West Virginia, US
- Occupation: Businessman
- Known for: Co-founding Heck's
- Spouse: Vivian Marie Summers
- Children: 2, Susan Lee Haddad and Frederick Lawrence "Larry" Haddad Jr.

Frederick Lawrence Haddad (January 18, 1921 – January 13, 2003) was a prominent Arab-American businessman who was a co-founder and President of Heck's, a major discount retail chain in West Virginia and neighboring states.

== Life ==
Haddad was born into a Syro-Lebanese Orthodox Christian family in 1921 in Clothier, West Virginia, the son of Nathan Makoul Haddad of Joub Jannine (then Syria) and Sarah Emma David of South Dakota. His father Nathan immigrated to West Virginia in 1909 with his four brothers. The Haddad family owned a clothing store in Madison, West Virginia, for years. The Haddad family were among a number of Syrian and Lebanese immigrants to the United States in the late 1800s and early 1900s who began their careers as peddlers and merchants, working their way to the top by the second generation. According to Fred's father Nathan, "We planned it that way...Most of us came here with no education, no knowledge of the language, and no money. We didn't expect to reach the top ourselves, but we certainly meant to give our children every chance to do it."

== Career ==
In 1959, Haddad co-founded Heck's along with Tommy Ellis, Lester Ellis, and Doug Cook. Heck's stands for Haddad, Ellis and Cook. By 1967, Heck's was making $22 million a year in profits. Haddad served as President of Heck's from 1959 until his retirement in the 1980s. Heck's became a national pioneer in discount retailing before going bankrupt in the late 1980s. Haddad retired as chairman of the board of Heck's in 1983.

In the late 1980s, Haddad and a consortium of four other businessmen purchased the Silver Creek resort (now part of Snowshoe Mountain) and in turn sold it to two Charleston realtors.

== Politics ==
Haddad was a member of the West Virginia Republican Party. In 1967, he ran unsuccessfully for Mayor of Charleston, West Virginia.

== Legacy ==
During the early 1990s, the Haddad Riverfront Park in Charleston, West Virginia was constructed as a gift from Fred Haddad. The new park removed riverfront parking to make way for a stage and seating for live performances and other events. The park transformed the levee into a local attraction.

In 2003, the West Virginia Senate passed Senate Resolution No. 22 memorializing Haddad as a "distinguished West Virginian".

== See also ==
- Heck's
