= P.M. Place Stores =

American discount store chain

- Type: Employee-owned
- Founded: 1910; 116 years ago in Lathrop, Missouri, United States
- Founder: Pryor M. Place
- Defunct: 2000
- Fate: Acquired by ShopKo
- Headquarters: Bethany, Missouri, United States
- Area served: Illinois; Iowa; Kansas; Missouri
- Website: Official website

P.M. Place Stores, also known as Place's Discount Stores, was a Bethany, Missouri-based, employee-owned chain of discount stores in the United States. The company primarily operated in towns with a population of 1,500 to 4,000 people in Illinois, Iowa, Kansas, and Missouri.

== Origins ==
P.M. Place Stores was founded in 1910 by Pryor M. Place in Lathrop, Missouri. Place financed his company by selling his horse, saddle, and bridle, and collected his savings to buy goods to stock his shelves.

== Store format ==
Place's stores carried the same departments as larger discount stores except on a smaller scale. Stores ranged from around 16,000 sq ft (1,500 m^{2}). to 27,000 sq ft (2,500 m^{2}). Their prominent slogan was "The Best of All... Places" which could be heard on a recording that would repeatedly play in their stores amongst music and announcement of the latest sale items.

== Expansion ==
In 1985 the company expanded through the acquisition of Matco/Mattingly stores, a Lexington, Missouri based chain of discount stores.

Place's attempted to grow to 75 stores by the end of 2002 but was bought by ShopKo in 2000 for $22 million with a store count of 49. ShopKo converted these stores into Pamida stores.

At the time of assimilation into Pamida, Place's president and CEO was Charles M. Place. Charles Patterson "Pat" Place had previously been in charge of the company.

In an effort to streamline Pamida's distribution operations, the Bethany cross-dock facility, formerly the Place's warehouse, was closed in early 2002.
