= Fishers Big Wheel =

Discount department store chain

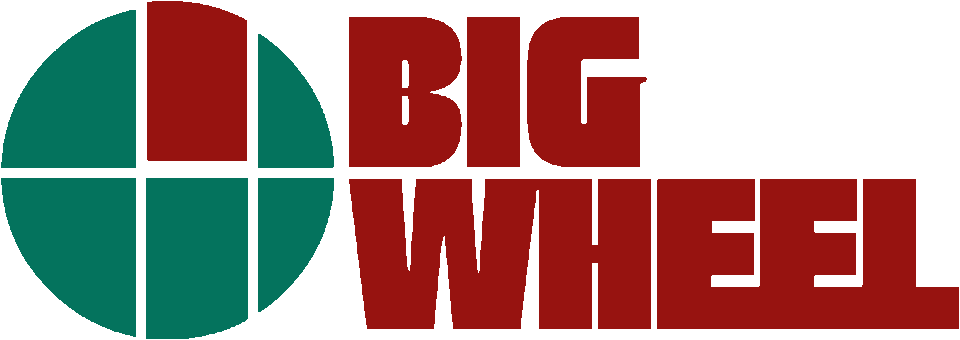
- Type: Discount department store
- Industry: Retail
- Founded: 1939; 87 years ago
- Defunct: 1994; 32 years ago
- Fate: Bankruptcy
- Headquarters: New Castle, Pennsylvania, United States
- Number of locations: 100+
- Area served: Connecticut, Indiana, Michigan, New York, Ohio, Pennsylvania, Rhode Island, West Virginia
- Key people: Peter H. Hollis
- Products: Clothing, photography, garden/seasonal, sporting goods, large appliances, records, hardware, footwear, bedding, furniture, jewelry, beauty products, electronics and housewares.
- Divisions: Buy Smart

Fishers Big Wheel, sometimes known as just Big Wheel, was a discount department store chain based in New Castle, Pennsylvania, United States. The company operated stores under the Fisher's Big Wheel and Buy Smart names. At its peak, the chain comprised more than 100 stores in the Northeastern and Midwestern United States. The chain declared bankruptcy in 1993, selling some stores to Pamida and closing others. The chain closed in 1994.

== History ==
Fisher's Big Wheel consolidated in 1939 following the consolidation of the Fisher Dry Goods company of New Castle, Pennsylvania and a hardware store called Big Wheel.

While based in the New Castle area, its headquarters were actually in Neshannock Township just north of the city. The company's flagship store was located next door, and was used as a prototype store. After the company's liquidation, the headquarters became various medical offices, while supermarket chain Giant Eagle consolidated two nearby locations and moved into the former flagship store.

Fishers Big Wheel primarily located in smaller towns which were not already served by other discount retailers, while in other markets, it competed directly with such discounters as Zayre, Kmart, Walmart, and Hills Department Store.

Several locations of Tempo and Buckeye Mart, two discount chains operated by Gamble-Skogmo, were also acquired by Fisher's in 1978. The stores were operated under the Fisher's Buckeye-Tempo nameplate.

In 1986, the company's president, Peter H. Hollis, left the chain and became the CEO of Ames Department Stores, where he served for four years before becoming executive vice president of Jamesway.

Big Wheel acquired ten former locations in 1989 from two discount chains in the Midwestern United States: eight from Danner's and two from Heck's Department Store.

Fisher's Big Wheel filed for Chapter 11 bankruptcy in 1993, closing ten of its stores. Fifty-five more stores were later closed in 1994 as a means of liquidation. Several locations were also sold to Pamida, a discount chain based in Omaha, Nebraska. On January 6, 1994 it began layoffs and liquidation under bankruptcy and closed the last of its operations by the end of the year.
