= Gibson's Discount Center =

Large discount store chain in the United States

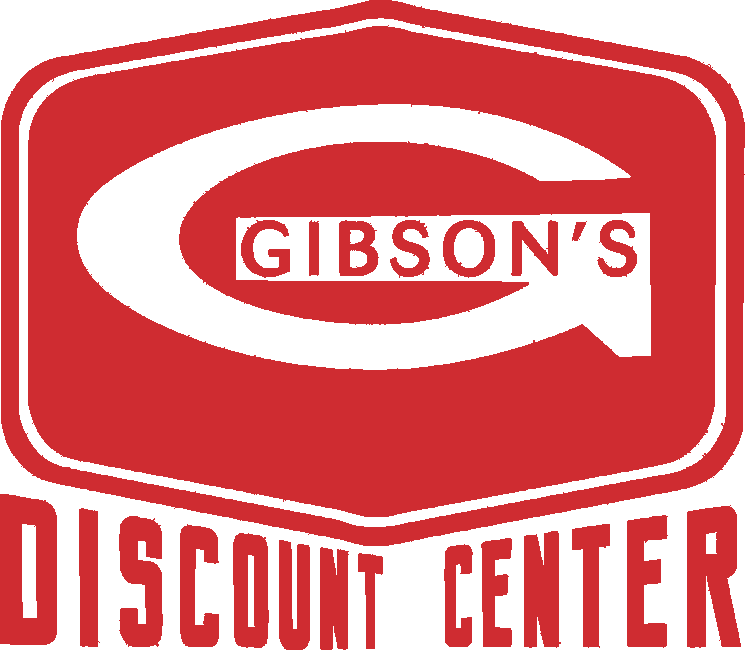
- Type: Private
- Industry: Retail
- Founded: 1936
- Defunct: 2003
- Fate: Closed
- Headquarters: Dodge City, Kansas United States
- Number of locations: 684 (1972)
- Products: Clothing, footwear, bedding, furniture, jewelry, beauty products, electronics, market, housewares, pharmacy.

Gibson's Discount Center, also known as Gibson's, was a large discount store chain in the United States.

There are a few Gibson's Discount Centers still operating under independent ownership; two in Texas in Weatherford and Kerrville, and two in Kansas in Salina and Clay Center. There is also a pharmacy in Dodge City, Kansas that uses the Gibson's name and logo as it was kept open after the discount center itself closed.

== History ==
Herbert R. Gibson and his wife, Belva, opened Gibson Products Co., a wholesale novelty company, in 1936 in Abilene, Texas. By the late 1950s, Gibson had decided to refocus on discounting, and he opened the first Gibson's Discount Center in Abilene in 1960. The company grew mostly by franchising the store concept to others. Sam Walton once inquired about obtaining a Gibson's franchise, but nothing came of it. By 1964, there were 138 Gibson's Discount Center stores generating $190 million in revenue; by 1968, there were 434 stores generating $1 billion in sales. The company's headquarters moved to Seagoville, Texas.

In 1972, Gibson transferred ownership of the company to sons Herbert Jr. and Gerald. By 1978, Gibson's had 684 stores across the United States. The company began to go into decline after that, in part because franchisees began to withdraw from the chain; the company's largest franchisee, Pamida Inc., began opening discount stores under its own name. Gibson's was sold in June 1984 to a company headed by Gary Chaffin. Chaffin sold the company in 1992, and it filed for Chapter 11 bankruptcy in 1996. Chaffin repurchased the company in 1999, which by this time was headquartered in Dodge City, Kansas. In November 2002, Gibson's announced it would close the chain's 17 remaining stores.

Two stores continue to operate independently under the Gibson's name, in Kerrville, Texas, and Weatherford, Texas. Gibson's stores in Kansas are members of Ace Hardware.

At one point in time, the Gibson's store in Great Bend, Kansas had what was called “The Biggest Outdoor Sign in Kansas.”

In the early 2020's, the former Grand Prairie, Texas Gibson’s Discount Center location was demolished and redeveloped as Gibson Apartments. The giant Gibson's Discount Center sign was also restored to its former glory.
