= Heck's =

Former department store chain

Heck's, Inc.
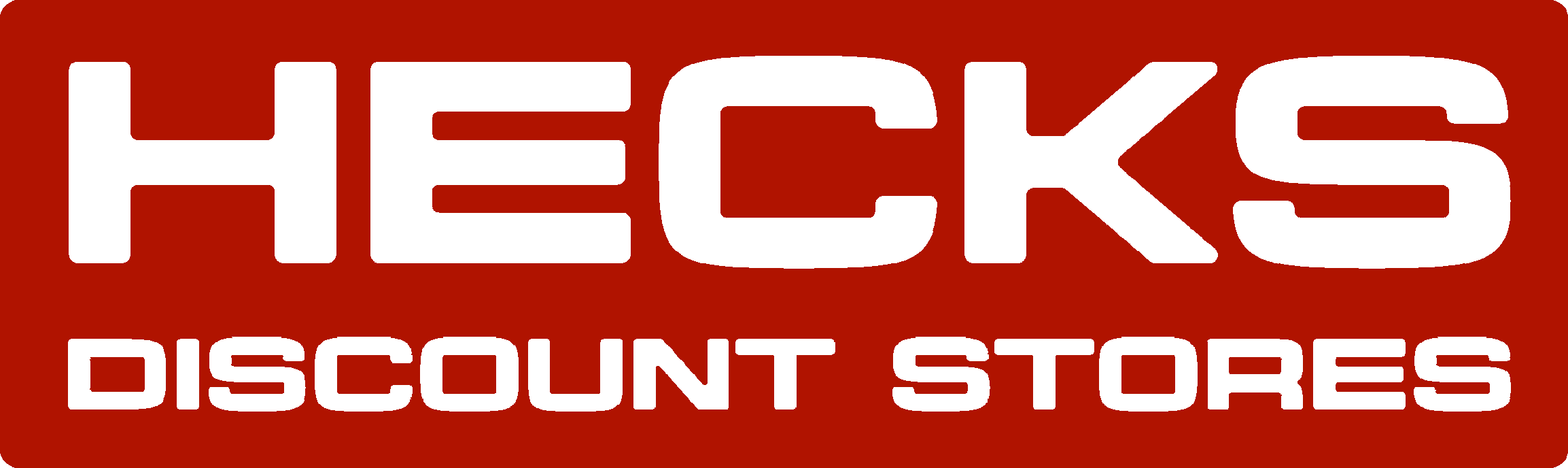
- Type: Discount department store
- Industry: Retail
- Founded: 1959; 67 years ago
- Defunct: 1990; 36 years ago
- Fate: Dissolved
- Number of locations: 170 (at peak)
- Area served: West Virginia, Ohio, Indiana, Virginia, Kentucky, Maryland, Tennessee, Pennsylvania, North Carolina
- Products: Clothing, garden/seasonal, sporting goods, hardware, footwear, bedding, furniture, jewelry, beauty products, electronics and housewares.

Heck's was a chain of discount department stores based in West Virginia. It was founded by Boone County natives and businessmen Fred Haddad, Tom Ellis, and Lester Ellis and wholesale distributor Douglas Cook. The Heck's name was a combination of the names Haddad, Ellis and Cook. Haddad served as president, Lester Ellis was vice-president, and Tom Ellis was Secretary-Treasurer.

== History ==
Heck's, Inc. was established in 1959 by Fred Haddad, Tom & Lester Ellis, and Doug Cook. The main office was located at 1012 Kanawha Boulevard, Charleston, West Virginia.

Heck's stores were discount, stand-alone department stores found in small cities throughout West Virginia, Virginia, western Maryland, the Ohio Valley and parts of Indiana, Kentucky and North Carolina. Its structure and product lines were similar to its competitors Fisher's Big Wheel, Hills Department Stores, G.C. Murphy's Mart, Tempo and Buckeye Mart Stores and Walmart.

Part of Heck's expansion into the Midwest came after acquiring a smaller discounter, T-Way Stores (Tradeway) of Indianapolis. It also acquired Mr. Wiggs of Indiana and Ohio in 1981.

At its peak in the 1980s, Heck's operated 170 stores throughout West Virginia, Ohio, Kentucky, Pennsylvania, Indiana, Maryland, Virginia and North Carolina. Forbes ranked Heck's third nationally in profitability and growth in 1980, beating out Kmart.

Haddad retired as Heck's president in 1983 and sold his stock in the company. The Ellis brothers had previously sold out in the 1970s.

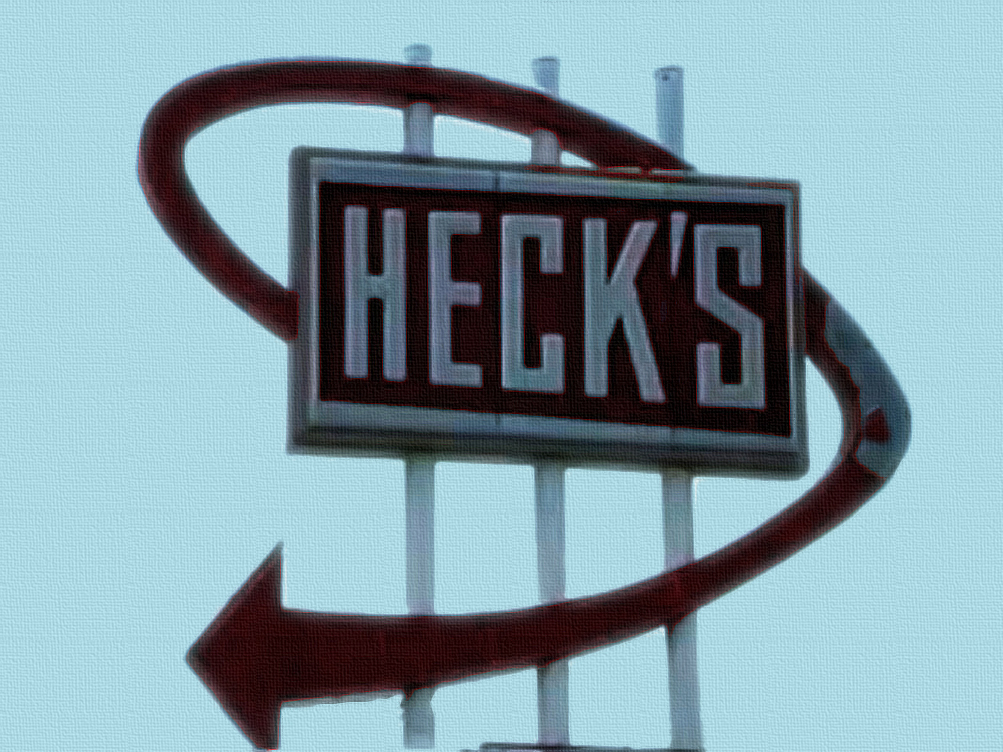
Sign from a defunct Heck's Discount Store in West Virginia

Sales fell the following year, and the company saw its first losses in 1984. Layoffs began in 1985 as losses continued.

A number of factors contributed to Heck's decline. The U.S. economic downturn of the early 1980s hit West Virginia particularly hard, and the store faced increased competition from other chains.

In February 1987 a $125 million merger agreement with New York City-Based Toussie-Viner Group was terminated due to weak performance by Heck's in the final months of 1986, and the company filed for Chapter 11 bankruptcy. At the time of the filing, Heck's operated 140 stores.

In 1989 the company emerged from Chapter 11 with 55 stores and a new name, Take 10 Discount Club, a membership club costing $10 (~$26.00 in 2025) to join.

Shortly afterward, all of the assets of the retail division were sold to Retail Acquisition Corporation, Inc., and became L.A. Joe Department Stores. Two locations were sold to, and became, Fisher's Big Wheel. One location was sold to Gabriel Brothers.

A 1991 Philadelphia Inquirer article lists several factors for the collapse of Heck's under the new management of Russell Isaacs, putting the blame on Isaacs' sweeping changes to the stores.

Specifically, the Inquirer cited customer frustration with constant store redesigns and products being dropped from inventory. The store also faced major troubles from costly data errors caused by its new computer accounting system.
