= Bay Park Square =

Mall in Green Bay, Wisconsin, United States

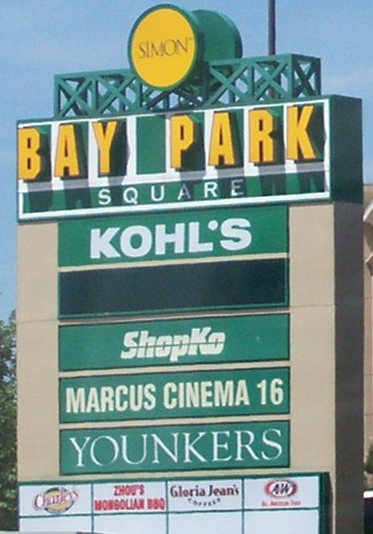
- Entrance sign
- Location: Ashwaubenon, Wisconsin, United States (Green Bay)
- Coordinates: 44.484594°N 88.067749°W
- Opened: October 1980; 46 years ago
- Developer: Edward J. DeBartolo Corp.
- Manager: Simon Property Group
- Owner: Simon Property Group
- Num. of stores: 92 (as of June 23, 2019)
- Num. of anchor tenants: 5
- Floor area: 711,918 sq ft (66,139.3 m^{2})
- Floors: 1 (2 in Steinhafels)
- Public transit: Green Bay Metro
- Website: www.simon.com/mall/bay-park-square

Bay Park Square is a shopping mall owned by Simon Property Group, in the Green Bay, Wisconsin suburb of Ashwaubenon, in the United States. The mall opened in 1980 under the ownership of the DeBartolo Corporation. Bay Park Square is located one mile (1.6 km) away from Lambeau Field on South Oneida Street (County Trunk Highway AAA).

The mall's anchors are Kohl's, Dave & Buster's, Marcus Cinemas, Steinhafels and Hy-Vee.

The mall also has an American football stadium-themed food court, known as the "Supper Bowl".

== History ==
Montgomery Ward announced plans for a new $10 million store and 700,000-square-foot (65,000 m^{2}) adjacent shopping mall in the town of Ashwaubenon, Wisconsin in 1969, which would replace their downtown Green Bay store. The mall was originally intended to open in 1971. Montgomery Ward hired E.D. Pehrson Associates of Chicago as developer. After delays, the Montgomery Ward store opened in 1972.

After the project stalled again in the mid-1970s, the Edward J. DeBartolo Corp. was brought in by Montgomery Ward as the new developer. By this time, the mall project was increased to 786,000 square feet (73,000 m^{2}). In 1979, Shopko was announced as the second anchor store of the new mall. Construction on the mall began in 1979, and the mall opened in 1980.

In 1981, the mall was expanded, adding an east wing and a Kohl's Department Store. The project added 94,000 square feet (8,700 m^{2}) of space to the mall.

In 1995, the mall underwent a major renovation, remodeling much of the interior of the mall. A new west wing was added, which included a food court taking up the former Marcus Theatres space and a new 75,000-square-foot (7,000 m^{2}) Elder-Beerman department store as the fourth anchor, which replaced the mall's main entrance. The mall then added two new angled entrances, one that went through to the new food court, and another that went through to the mall walkway running parallel to the side of the new Elder-Beerman department store. Marcus Theatres built a new 16-screen movie theater on an outlot of the mall behind ShopKo. A 20,000-square-foot (1,900 m^{2}) addition was made to the Kohl's store at the same time.

Simon Property Group acquired Bay Park Square when they merged with the mall's owners, the DeBartolo Corporation.

Montgomery Ward closed in 2001. In 2003, the south wing was expanded and a new Younkers department store was built. Elder-Beerman closed in 2007 following their acquisition by Younkers' parent company, The Bon-Ton. A Younkers Furniture Gallery later replaced the Elder-Beerman store. Both stores closed in mid-2018 due to Bon-Ton's bankruptcy and the entire chain going out of business. Shopko would meet the same fate on June 16, 2019, when the last of its stores, including the Bay Park Square store, closed (its corporate headquarters was located directly across from the mall and remains vacant).

In 2019, a plan was announced to have Dave & Buster's occupy the former Younkers Furniture space. Panda Express, Blaze Pizza and Mission BBQ also announced plans to build in outlets on the mall property.

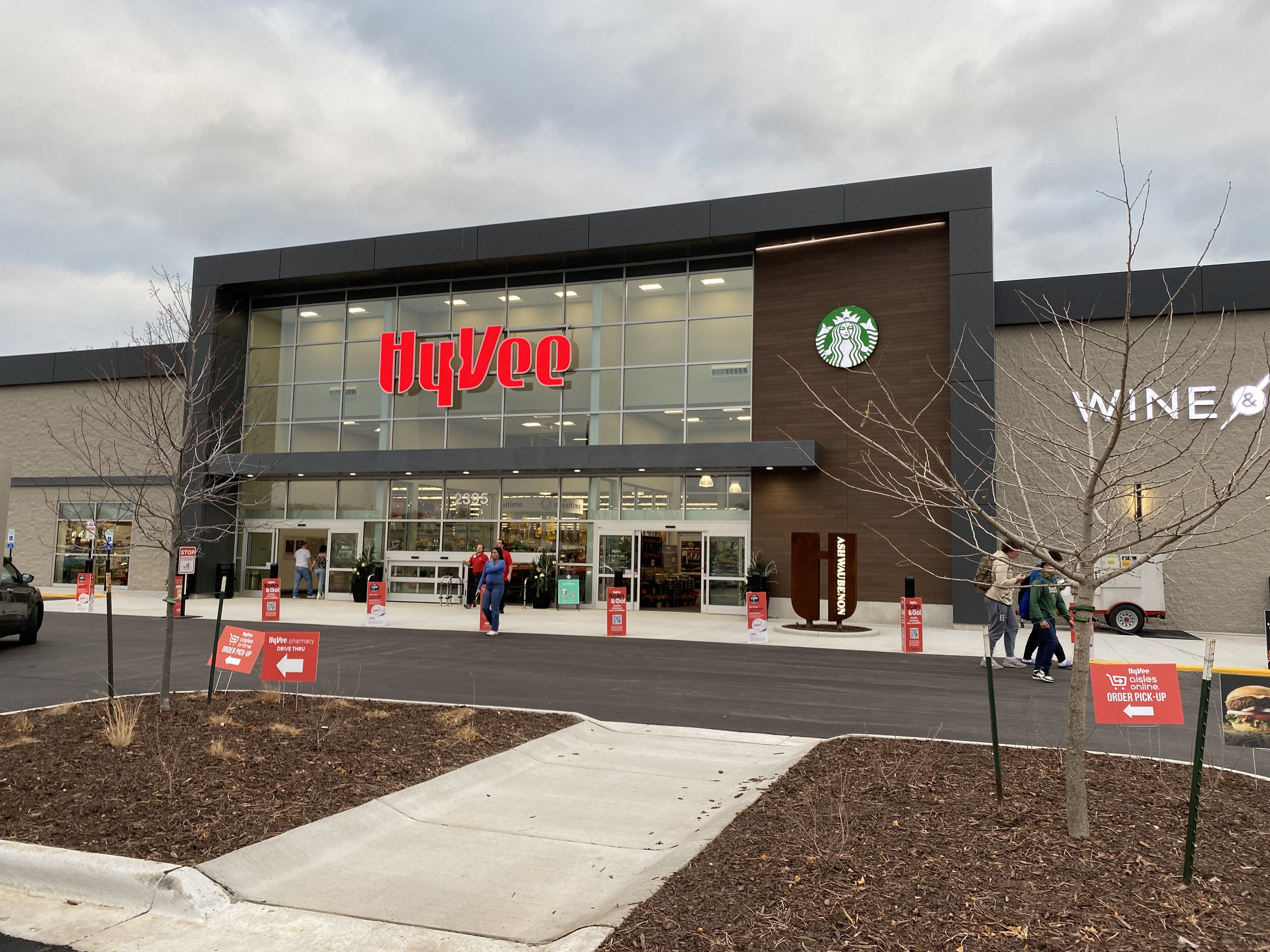
The front entrance to Hy-Vee, which does not have a secondary access entrance into the mall

Dave & Buster's opened in January 2021 after a delayed opening due to the COVID-19 pandemic. Panda Express opened in late 2020 in the parking lot of Dave & Buster's. Waukesha-based Steinhafels Furniture opened in the former Younkers space in early April 2022, with a portion of its southeast side subdivided into a future store space. Chick-fil-A opened its first northeastern Wisconsin location in the front of the mall near Dave & Busters in March 2022. Supermarket chain Hy-Vee opened its largest store in the former Shopko space on November 8, 2022; it does not have an entrance into the actual mall.

Bay Park Square anchors timeline
1970s								1980s										1990s										2000s										2010s										2020s		
72	73	74	75	76	77	78	79	80	81	82	83	84	85	86	87	88	89	90	91	92	93	94	95	96	97	98	99	00	01	02	03	04	05	06	07	08	09	10	11	12	13	14	15	16	17	18	19	20	21	22
Montgomery Ward (1972)																													Montgomery Ward closes (2001)	vacant	Younkers (2003)															Younkers closes (2018)	vacant		Steinhafels Furniture (opening 2021)	
							ShopKo (1979)																																								ShopKo closes (2019)	vacant		Hy-Vee
									Kohl's (1981)																																									
																							Elder-Beerman (1995)												Elder-Beerman closes, Younkers Furniture Gallery opens (2007)											Younkers Furniture Gallery closes (2018)	Dave & Buster's planned opening in 2019. Opening delayed due to the COVID-19 pandemic.		Dave & Buster's (2021)	
