= Brown County Veterans Memorial Arena =

Former entertainment venue in Ashwaubenon, Wisconsin

- The Arena, Brown County Arena
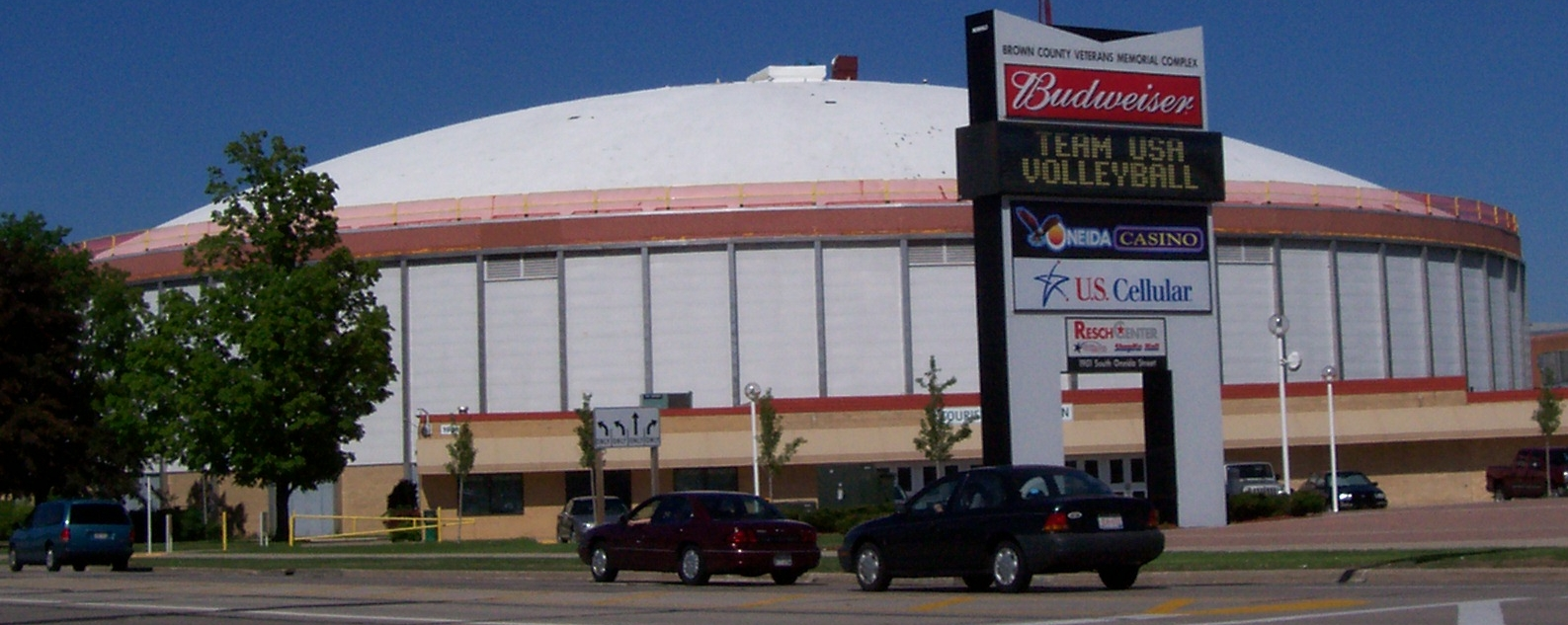
- Interactive map of Brown County Veterans Memorial Arena
- Location: Ashwaubenon, Wisconsin, U.S.
- Coordinates: 44°30′01″N 88°03′24″W
- Owner: Brown County
- Operator: PMI Entertainment Group
- Capacity: 5,248

Construction
- Groundbreaking: 1957
- Opened: November 11, 1958
- Closed: April 6, 2019
- Demolished: April 30, 2019
- Cost: $2 million

Tenants
- Green Bay Bobcats (USHL) (1961–1981); UW–Green Bay Phoenix (NCAA) (1969–2002); Green Bay Ice (AHA) (1992–1993); Green Bay Gamblers (USHL) (1994–2002); Wisconsin Blast (IBA) (1997–1999); Green Bay Bombers (PIFL/IFL) (1998–2000)

The Brown County Veterans Memorial Arena (more commonly known as the Brown County Arena) was a 5,248-seat multipurpose arena in Ashwaubenon, Wisconsin, situated on the corner of Lombardi Avenue and Oneida Street, across from Lambeau Field. The arena opened on November 11, 1958. The final event held at the arena was a Bret Michaels concert on April 6, 2019. The building, along with neighboring Shopko Hall, was replaced by a new exposition center, Resch Expo, in 2021. Demolition of the arena began April 30, 2019.

== History ==
The arena was dedicated in honor of the county's World War II veterans. The arena was the first large venue in the city (expanding on the Riverside Ballroom's small capacity), allowing large entertainment acts to come to Green Bay, as Lambeau Field and the Packers have been historically averse to allowing other events in their stadium (only starting to do so in the 2010s) to protect its field surface. It was the city and county's main indoor venue until the Resch Center opened in 2002. The Green Bay Packers Hall of Fame was first established inside the Brown County Arena as a small exhibit on a wall.

== Events ==
The arena hosted a breakfast for John F. Kennedy in 1960.

Elvis Presley gave a performance at the arena on April 28, 1977. He would die 4 months after the show on August 16.

It was the home arena for the University of Wisconsin–Green Bay basketball teams.

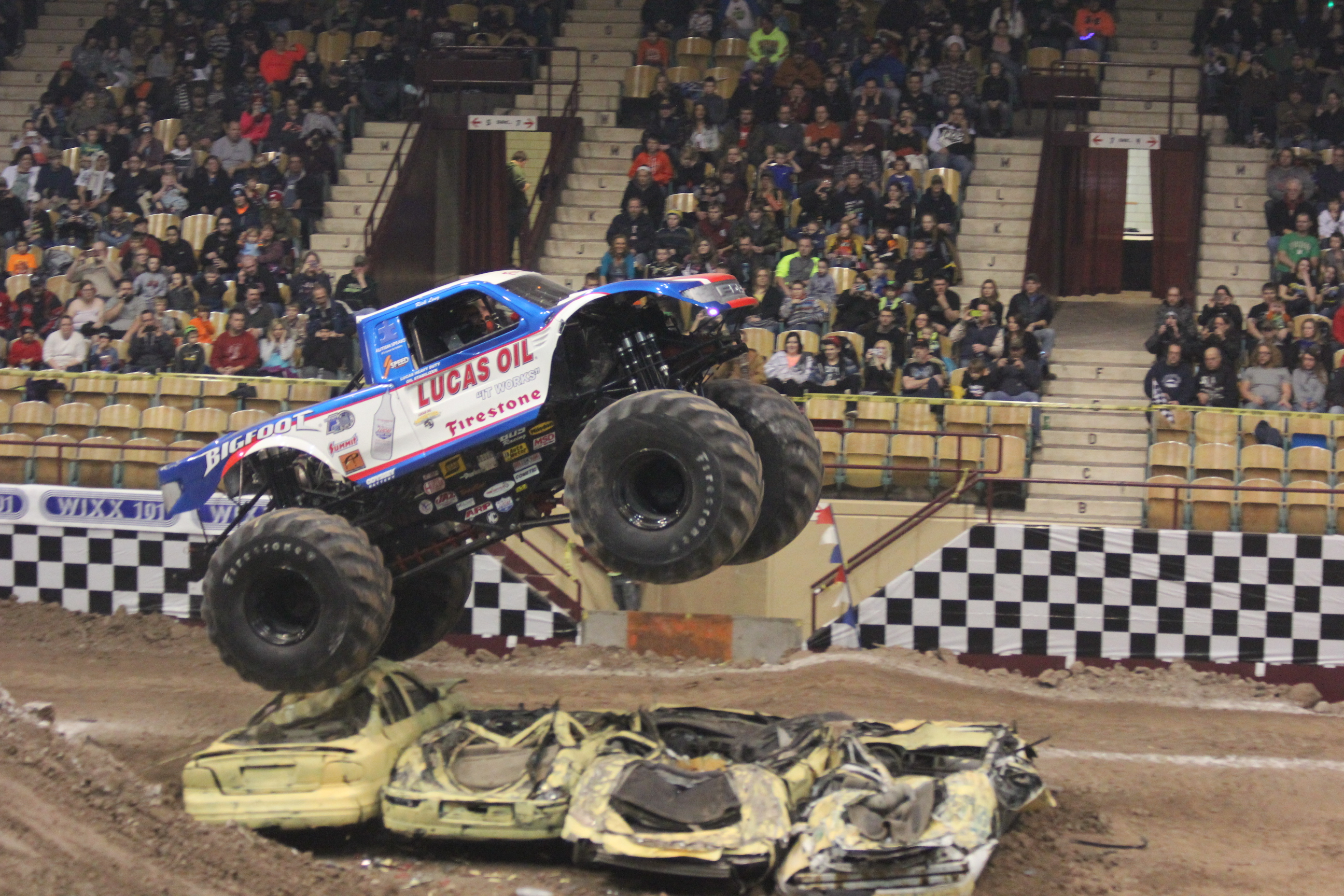
The monster truck Bigfoot jumping inside the arena (2015)

It hosted the 1991 Mid-Continent Conference (now Summit League) men's basketball tournament and the Midwestern Collegiate Conference (now Horizon League) men's basketball tournament in 1998.

The Arena continued to play host to concerts, ice shows, local sporting shows, high school graduations, and other events but was largely phased out as a sports arena, because of its age and an older seating layout. Most area sports teams that once used the arena now play home games in the newer Resch Center next door, while some higher-tier concerts moved to the Weidner Center on the University of Wisconsin–Green Bay campus. In its waning years, it continued to be used as an overflow site for some matches.

Brown County Arena played host to several WWF events in the 1980s and resuming again in the early 2000s, with house shows.

=== Pro wrestling ===
Throughout the 1980s and 1990s, the World Wrestling Federation would hold live events as well as WWF TV tapings in the arena. The AWA and WCW would also go on to have many live events at the arena. In 1998 the WWF took a three-year hiatus from the Brown County Arena. In January 2001 and in February 2002, the World Wrestling Federation returned with two house shows before leaving their older location for the brand new Resch Center.

The XWF held three live house show type events in their first-ever tour outside the original tapings that took place at Universal Studios in Orlando, Florida. These events occurred in December 2001. One of the venues the XWF ran was the Brown County Arena. The other stops on the tour included Hammond Indiana and Milwaukee Wisconsin.

XWF in Your Face drew a large crowd and featured performers including Curt Hennig, The Road Warriors, the Nasty Boys and Rowdy Roddy Piper, along with former WCW talent such as Vampiro, Buff Bagwell, and Norman Smiley following WWF's acquisition of the promotion.

== Final concert and closure ==
A final concert was held at the arena on April 6, 2019, featuring Bret Michaels. Michaels was the lead singer of Poison, and the group's first video for the song "Every Rose Has Its Thorn" was filmed at the venue. The band started every one of their world tours here. Michaels was selected as the final act because he opened more tours at the arena than anyone else. The concert had a Nostalgia theme, and it utilized canned lighting. A remake video for the song was filmed at the final concert.

A closing ceremony was held starting at noon on Monday, April 29, 2019. After the ceremony, county residents were allowed to take two free seats or purchase a four-seat bench for $50.

== See also ==
- Shopko Hall
