= Resch Expo =

Convention center in Ashwaubenon, Wisconsin

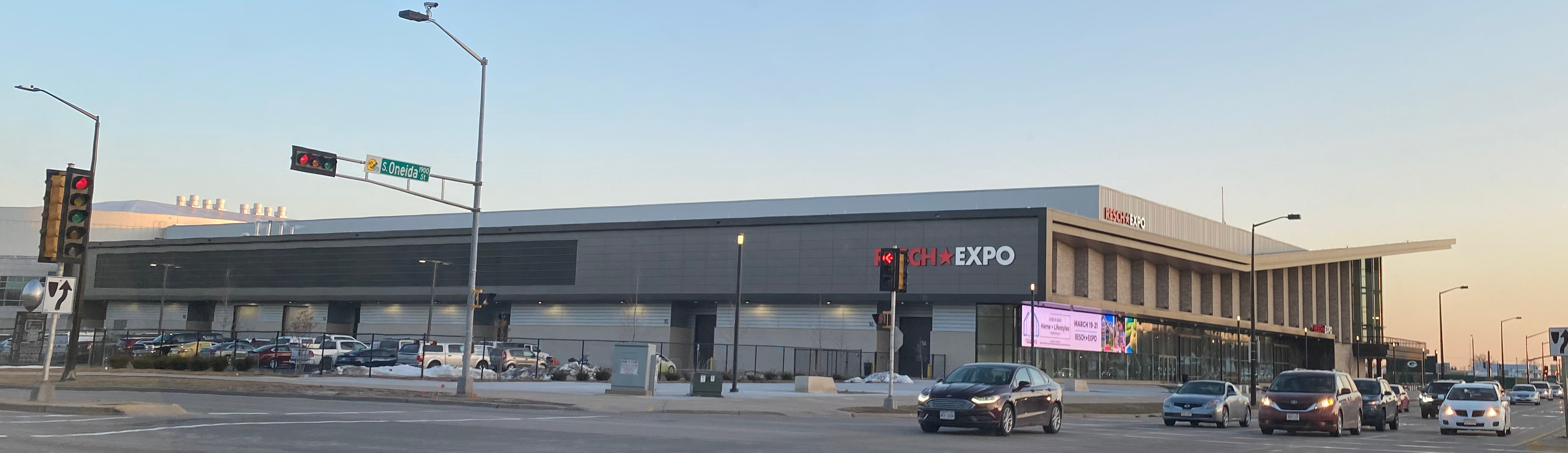
- The Resch Expo building several weeks after opening in March 2021.
- Interactive map of Resch Expo
- Former names: Brown County Expo Center (placeholder)
- Location: Ashwaubenon, Wisconsin
- Coordinates: 44°30′00″N 088°03′22″W
- Owner: Brown County, Wisconsin
- Operator: PMI Entertainment Group

Construction
- Built: 2020–2021
- Opened: Early January 2021; 5 years ago
- Cost: $93 million ($117 million in 2025 dollars) (Estimated)

The Resch Expo is a multi-purpose exhibition center in the village of Ashwaubenon, Wisconsin, a suburb of Green Bay, in the United States; directly across the street from Lambeau Field. It was built to replace Shopko Hall and the Brown County Veterans Memorial Arena, both of which were nearly 60 years of age and becoming increasingly expensive to operate. They were both razed in May 2019. The project was completed in January 2021; the cost of the project is estimated to be $93 million.

On February 13, 2020, Brown County announced that the center would be named Resch Expo following a 20-year, $10 million agreement with KI Industries CEO Dick Resch, who also owns the naming rights to the nearby Resch Center.

== Features ==
The center features three convention halls totaling 125,000 square feet (11,600 m^{2}) of exhibit space, nearly three times more than Shopko Hall. The center also has six meeting rooms available.

Resch Expo will take the events formerly at Shopko Hall, including the Titletown Train Show, Everybody's Rummage Sale, Sweet Street (a yearly child-friendly Halloween celebration with trick-or-treating), the WBAY-TV Pet Expo, and the WBAY RV & Camping Show.
