= Shepherd Mall =

Coordinates: 35.4935306°N 97.5567639°W

- Location: Oklahoma City, Oklahoma
- Opened: Nov. 1964 (original indoor mall only)
- Closed: 2003 (original indoor mall only)
- Developer: Charles L. Jenkins and Ray C. Broce
- Floor area: 630,000 sq ft (59,000 m^{2})
- Floors: 2
- Parking: 4,200 parking spaces at the time of mall opening

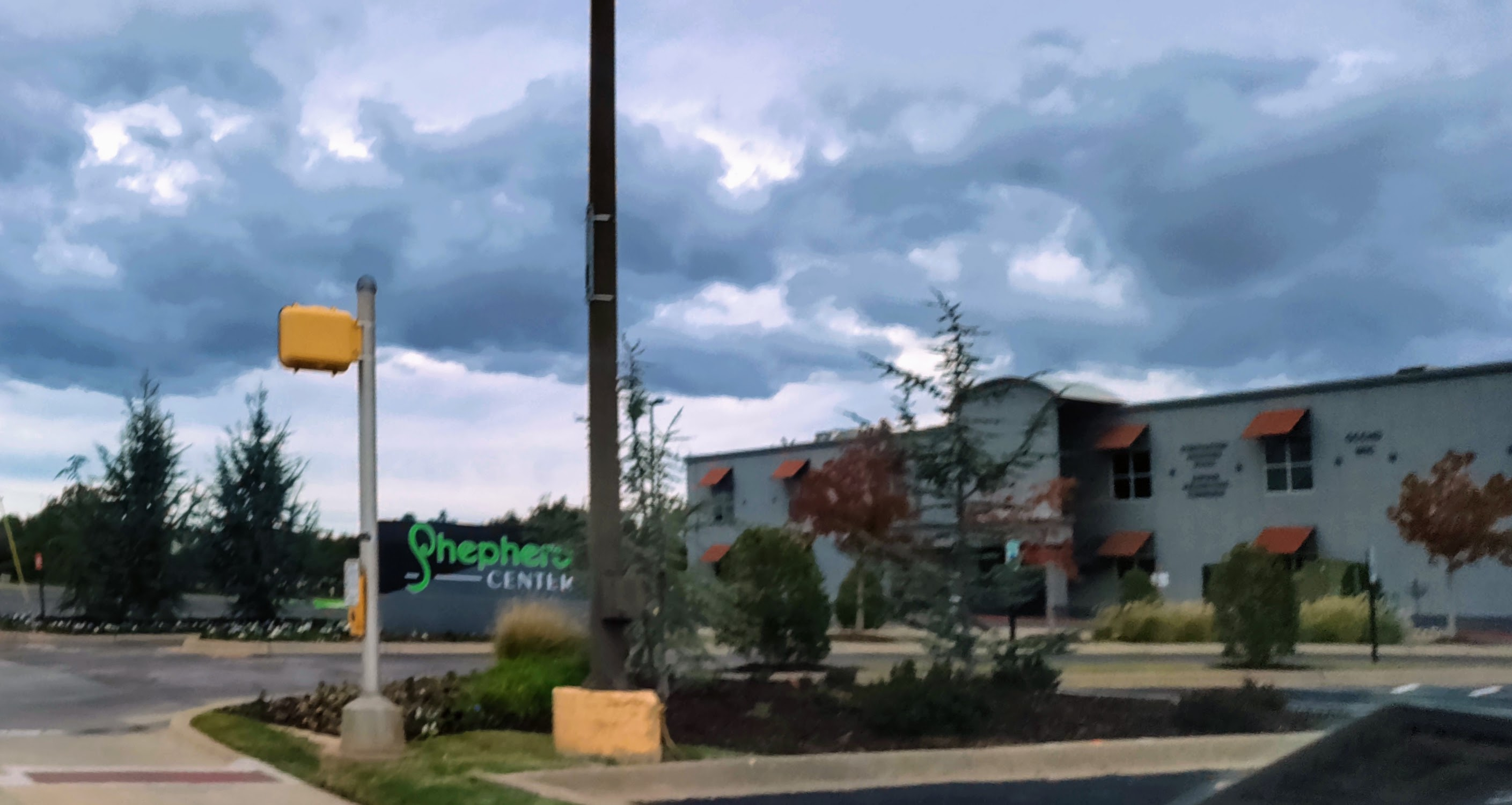
photo of entrance of Shepherd Center (formerly Shepherd Mall)

Shepherd Mall is a former shopping mall located in Oklahoma City, Oklahoma that opened in 1964 as the first fully-enclosed indoor shopping mall in Oklahoma City; however, by 2003 all of the anchors had closed and the mall was well underway in transitioning to being primarily an office complex.

== History ==
The area where Shepherd Mall would later be built was part of a 160 acre homestead claimed by George Shepherd during the land run of 1889. While much of the original homestead was later developed into a housing addition in the early 1930s (which today is known as the Shepherd Historic District), members of the Shepherd family continued to live in the old house (which was surrounded by the mall parking lot after the fall was constructed) until 1970. (The old Shepherd family home was later moved to the Harn Homestead historic site near the state capitol in the 1987.)

Shepherd Mall had its grand opening on Nov. 5, 1964 and received local media attention for "creating its own weather" (this was Oklahoma City's first indoor shopping mall). It was built by Harmon Construction Company over one and half years.

During its heyday, Shepherd Mall was home to both anchor stores like Oklahoma-based chains TG&Y and Kerr's (later occupied by Dillard Brown Dunkin, related to John A. Brown, as well as national chains like McCrory's, Dillards and J.C. Penney but also by smaller stores, restaurants (including the famed El Charrito restaurant)and service businesses including at times a travel agency, a bank, and a credit union. The mall also had a two screen movie theater for a time.

In 2017, the complex's name was changed to "Shepherd Center" to reflect the building's current use, and today houses a variety of government and corporate tenants.
