= John G. McCrory =

American businessman

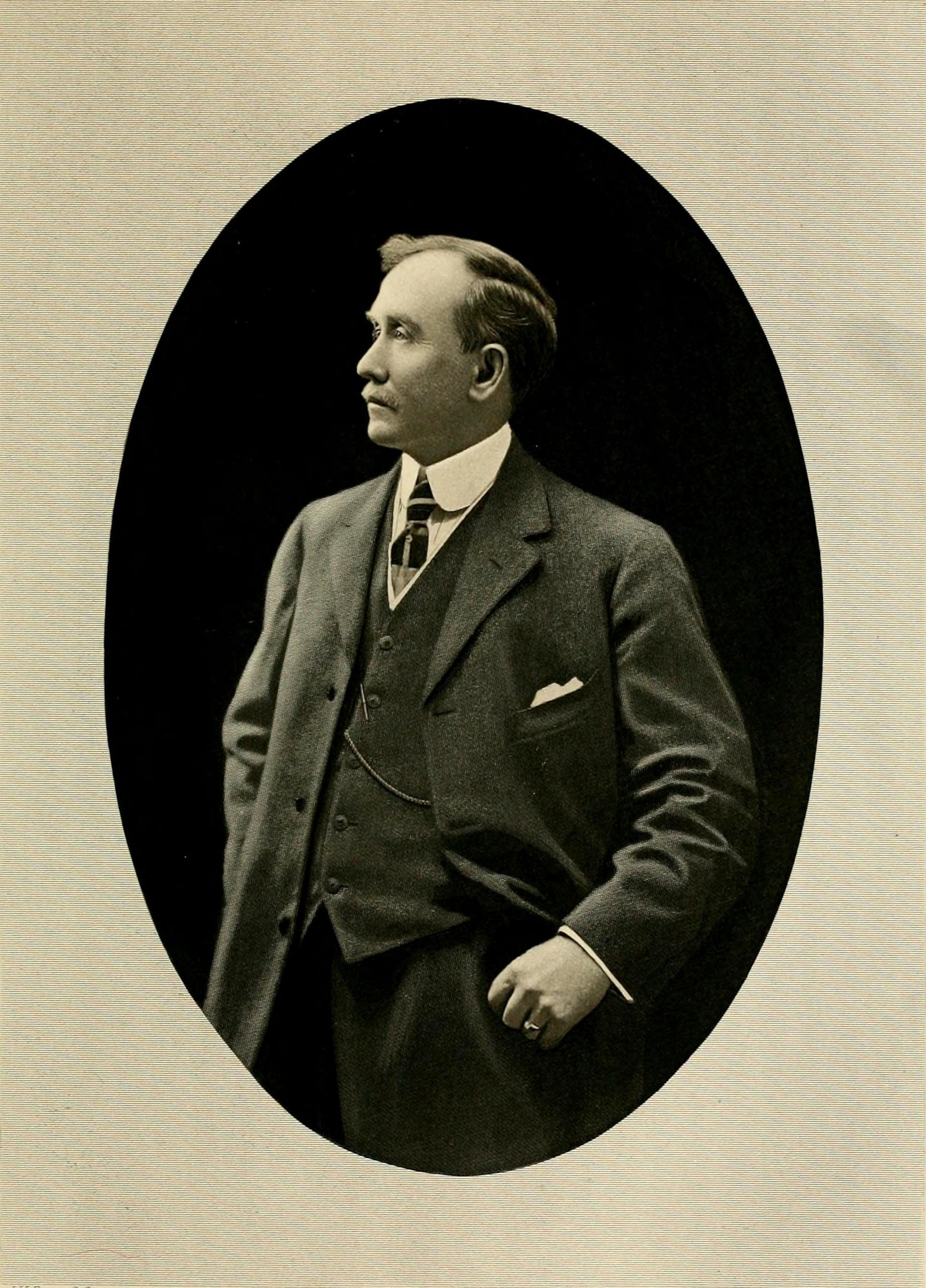
John G. McCrory

John Graham McCrory (October 11, 1860 – November 20, 1943), né McCrorey, was an American businessman who made his fortune as a retailer. He was the founder of a chain of five and dime stores that bore his name, known as McCrory Stores. The company was so named because McCrorey did not want to pay for extra letters on his store signs, and he eventually changed his legal last name to "McCrory" so as to avoid confusion. The first McCrory store opened in Scottdale, Pennsylvania in 1882.

McCrory originally had a partnership with Sebastian Kresge, who later founded his own chain of stores after McCrory dissolved their partnership. In addition to the Kresge stores, McCrorey competed with F.W. Woolworth's stores as well. The original company became insolvent during the Great Depression, but was reformed and eventually grew to include G. C. Murphy, TG&Y, and J. J. Newberry along with what was left of Kresge's chain, surviving all of its major competitors before succumbing to liquidation itself in 2002.

McCrory was born in Indiana County, Pennsylvania, to James and Mary (Murphy) McCrorey. He was married twice: in 1893 to Lillie May Peters, who died in 1902, and in 1904 to Carrie May McGill. A son from his first marriage, Van Clair McCrory, was vice president of the McCory Corporation before dying in a 1929 hunting accident. The elder McCrory died in 1943 at his home in Brush Valley, Pennsylvania, aged 83.
