= TGY =

TGY may refer to:

- TG&Y, American retail chain (1995–2002)
- Tieguanyin, a Chinese oolong tea
