= Kresge-Newark =

Department store in Newark, New Jersey

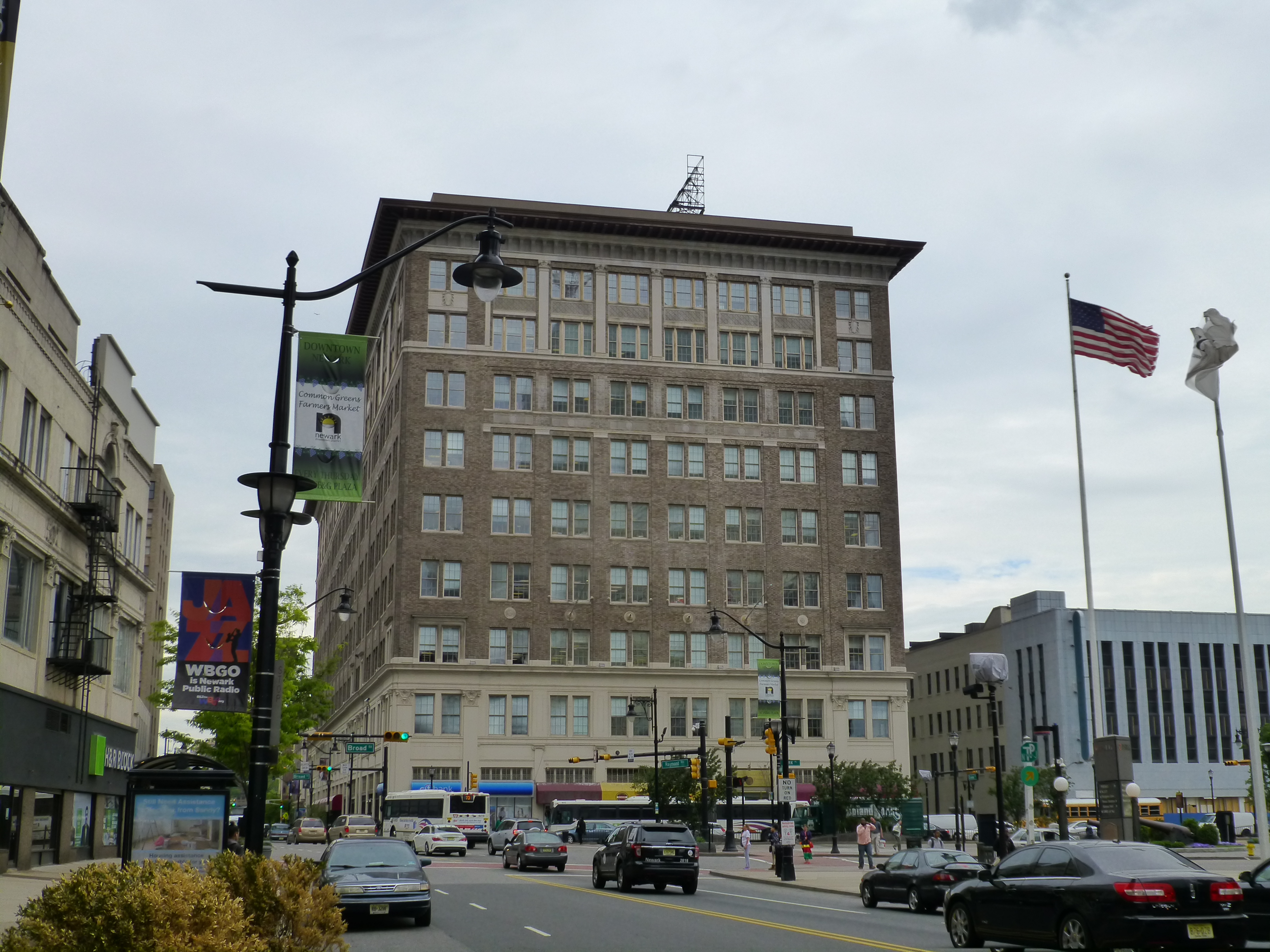
- Industry: Retail
- Defunct: 1964
- Fate: Sale
- Successor: Chase-Newark
- Headquarters: Newark, New Jersey
- Key people: Sebastian Kresge, David Chase
- Products: Clothing, footwear, bedding, furniture, jewelry, housewares, appliances.

Kresge-Newark was an upper-middle market department store based in Newark, New Jersey. The firm was started in 1923 when its founder Sebastian Kresge purchased the L.S. Plaut Department store in downtown Newark and rebranded the business Kresge-Newark. This store had no management connection to the S.S. Kresge 5 & 10 chain based in Detroit, Michigan. In 1926, Kresge replaced the original Plaut store, nicknamed "The Bee Hive," which had been built in 1891, with a larger flagship store that occupied the entire city block, between Broad and Halsey streets, and Cedar Street and Raymond Boulevard. It contained more than 600,000 square feet (56,000 m^{2}) of selling space on ten levels (nine stories plus a basement store). Such was the store's prominence in the city that in 1927 it arranged to have an underground streetcar platform opened at its basement level, allowing customers to come in directly from streetcars; the only access was through the Kresge store on one side of the platform and through McCrory on the other side.

The firm positioned itself between its popular priced rival, Bamberger's, and its more upscale competitor, Hahne & Company. Kresge was the last of Newark's department stores to remain independent, and its customer loyalty was fierce. During the Christmas selling season, Kresge's operated a monorail ride around its toy department, and its Breakfast With Santa sold out early each season.

In the 1940s the firm opened a multi-story parking garage, one block from its store. The garage located at the corner of Raymond Blvd.& University Avenue was the only structure of its type in downtown Newark that was run by a department store. Bamberger's and Hahne's offered small surface lots next to their stores. With the opening of the garage, Kresge-Newark used the motto, "easiest to reach, pleasantness to shop in". This motto was related to not only the parking garage, but the store's underground streetcar platform entrance, and numerous bus lines that ran along Broad Street.

Kresge changed with the times by opening a branch in Summit in 1946, and in 1959 when B. Altman & Company moved its store from East Orange to Short Hills, Kresge-Newark took over the East Orange store as its location. The Summit Branch (and it was marketed under this name) initially offered home furnishings, appliances and the like, but was enlarged in the 1950s to carry a full line of merchandise. Kresge also saw the type of business lines that discount stores were fast becoming dominant in (lawn supplies, hardware, and the like), and in turn leased the top two floors of its flagship store to the Western Electric Company for use as office space.

Kresge-Newark also took a lead in many civic improvements and was active in the early planning of the Gateway Center (which opened long after the store's demise). The store also formed an alliance with Asbury Park-based Steinbach.

In 1964, with it clear that his heirs had no desire to take over the department store business, the Kresge Foundation sold the stores to David Chase, and they were rebranded Chase-Newark. In 1967 Chase-Newark announced it was closing, and four selling floors of the Newark flagship were leased to the Two Guys chain. The two branch stores were closed at this time and the downtown Newark location reopened as a Two Guys unit in the fall of 1967.
