= Chase-Newark =

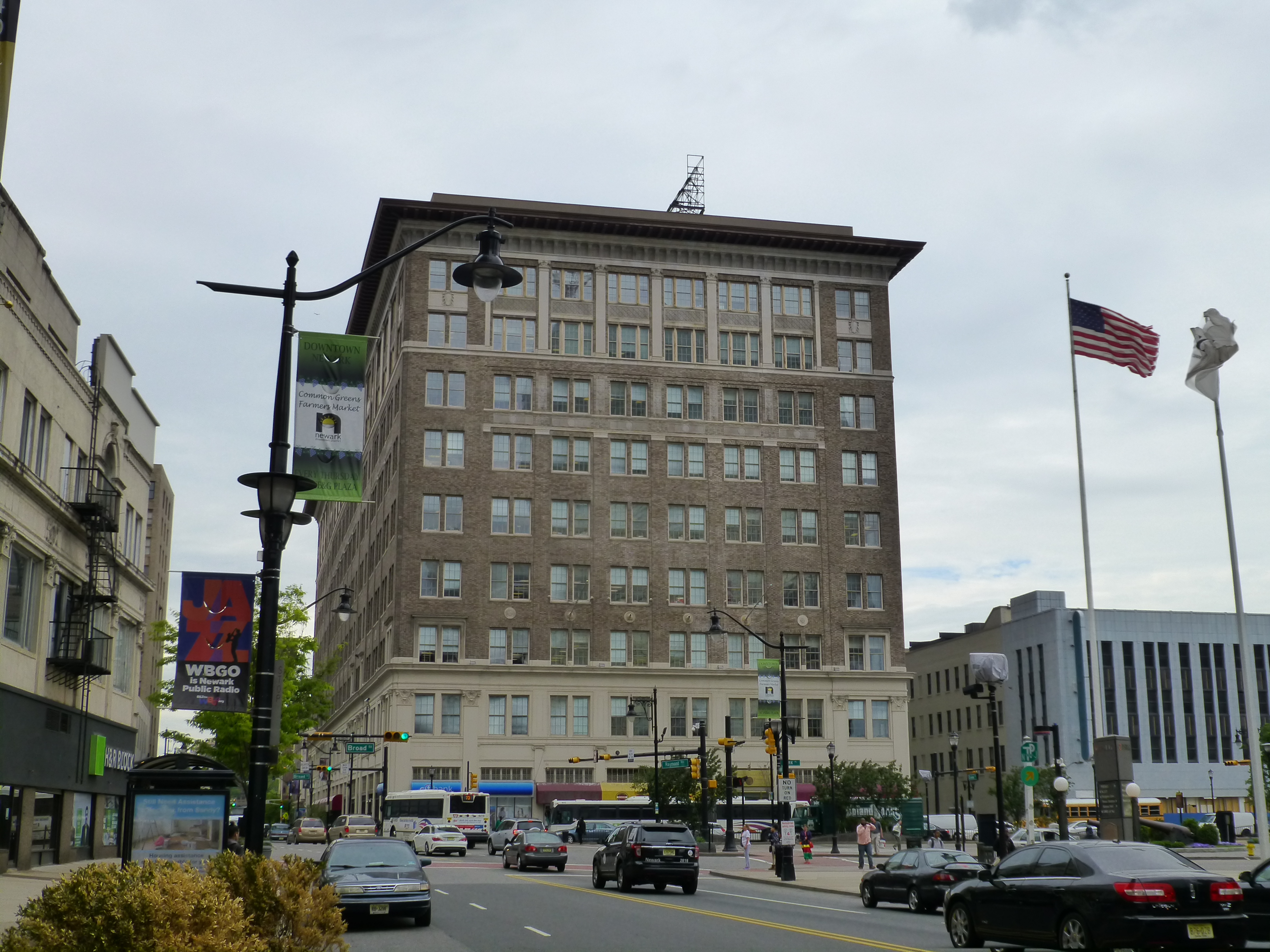
- The Chase-Newark department store building in Newark
- Company type: Privately held company
- Industry: Retail
- Founded: 1964
- Defunct: 1967
- Fate: Liquidation
- Successor: Two Guys
- Headquarters: Newark, NJ, United States
- Key people: David Chase
- Products: Clothing, footwear, bedding, furniture, jewelry, toys, sporting goods, housewares, appliances

Chase-Newark was a short lived, upper middle-market American department store based in Newark, New Jersey. The company also operated 2 suburban stores during its three-year history.

== History ==
Chase-Newark was founded early in 1964 when David Chase purchased the Kresge-Newark Department stores from the Kresge Foundation, and leased back 5 floors of the downtown Newark location. When Sebastian Kresge (the founder of Kresge-Newark) died a foundation was set up to run the stores that bore his name. David Chase could have used the Kresge name but instead re-branded the stores Chase-Newark, as he planned to refocus the stores to be (like Kresge), more upmarket compared to Bamberger's, but more trendy and fashion aware than Kresge-Newark was.

It was reported that David Chase spent close to 1 million dollars renovating the downtown Newark flagship to fit his vision. Chase-Newark used 5 selling floors of the flagship building, down from 8 last used by Kresge. The Western Electric Company that leased the 2 top floors from Kresge, now leased the top 5 floors from Chase for use as their corporate offices. Like Kresge, Chase-Newark continued the tradition of maintaining display windows in an unbroken chain along the Broad Street, Raymond Boulevard, and Halsey Street sides of the flagship.

The Chase era did not last long, and in early 1967 it was announced that Chase would cease doing business, and that 4 selling floors of the flagship location were being leased to the Two Guys chain.
