= S. S. Kresge =

American businessman (1867–1966), founder of Kmart

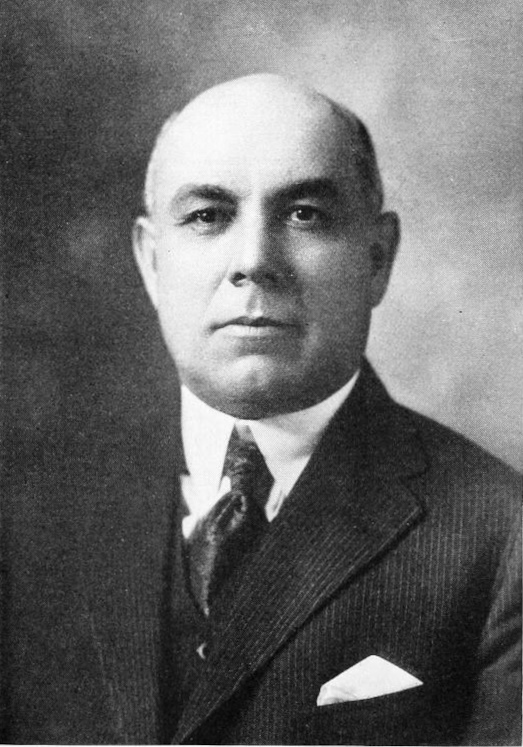
- Born: Sebastian Spering Kresge; July 31, 1867; Allentown, Pennsylvania, U.S.
- Died: October 18, 1966 (aged 99); East Stroudsburg, Pennsylvania, U.S.
- Education: Eastman Business College
- Known for: Kmart

Sebastian Spering Kresge (July 31, 1867 – October 18, 1966) was an American merchant and businessman. He created and owned two chains of department stores: the S. S. Kresge Company, one of the 20th century's largest discount retail organizations, and the Kresge-Newark traditional department store chain. The discounter was renamed the Kmart Corporation in 1977.

== Early life and education ==
Kresge was born near Allentown, Pennsylvania, the son of Sebastian Kresge and the former Catherine Kunkle. Living on the family farm in Kresgeville (named for his ancestors, his great-great-grandfather being Conrad Kresge, a farmer and pioneer of Pennsylvania Dutch descent) until he was 21 years old, he was educated in the local public schools, the Fairview Academy, in Brodheadsville, Pennsylvania, and at the Eastman Business College in Poughkeepsie, New York, from which he graduated in March 1889.

== Career ==
Following his graduation, he clerked in a hardware store for two years, then worked as a traveling salesman from 1892 to 1897. On March 20, 1897, Kresge began working for James G. McCrory, the founder of J.G. McCrory's, at a five and ten cent store in Memphis, Tennessee. He continued there for two years.

In 1897 he founded his own company, with Charles J. Wilson, with an $8,000 investment in two five-and-ten-cent stores; one was in downtown Detroit, Michigan, for which he traded ownership in McCrory's. In 1912, he incorporated the S.S. Kresge Company with 85 stores. The company was first listed on the New York Stock Exchange on May 23, 1918. During World War I, Kresge experimented with raising the limit on prices in his stores to $1.

In 1923, he again started a new company, buying out L.S. Plaut & Co., a large traditional department store in Newark, New Jersey. He renamed the store Kresge-Newark, expanded it, and started branch stores. The new department store company was completely independent from the S.S. Kresge discount department store company. By 1924, Kresge was worth approximately $375,000,000 ($3.83 billion in 2009 dollars) and owned real estate of the approximate value of $100,000,000.

== Personal life ==
He was married and divorced at least twice by 1928. He had 6 children. Kresge and his family were members of Detroit's North Methodist Episcopal Church. He held membership in numerous organizations including four Masonic lodges and the Ancient Arabic Order of the Nobles of the Mystic Shrine, YMCA, the Detroit Athletic, Boat, and Golf Clubs, Rotary, and various commercial and automobiling societies.

Kresge died on October 18, 1966, at the age of 99.

== Legacy ==
The first Kmart opened in 1962 in Garden City, Michigan. Kresge died in 1966. In 1977, the S. S. Kresge Corporation changed its name to the Kmart Corporation. In 2005, Sears Holdings Corporation became the parent of Kmart and Sears, after Kmart bought Sears, and formed the new parent.

In 1924, Kresge established The Kresge Foundation, a non-profit organization whose income he specified simply "to promote the well-being of mankind". By the time of his death, Kresge had given the foundation over $60,000,000. A strongly committed prohibitionist, he organized the National Vigilance Committee for Prohibition enforcement and also heavily supported the Anti-Saloon League financially, though he later stopped contributions. By 2022, the Foundation's endowment had grown to over $4 billion.

== Namesakes ==
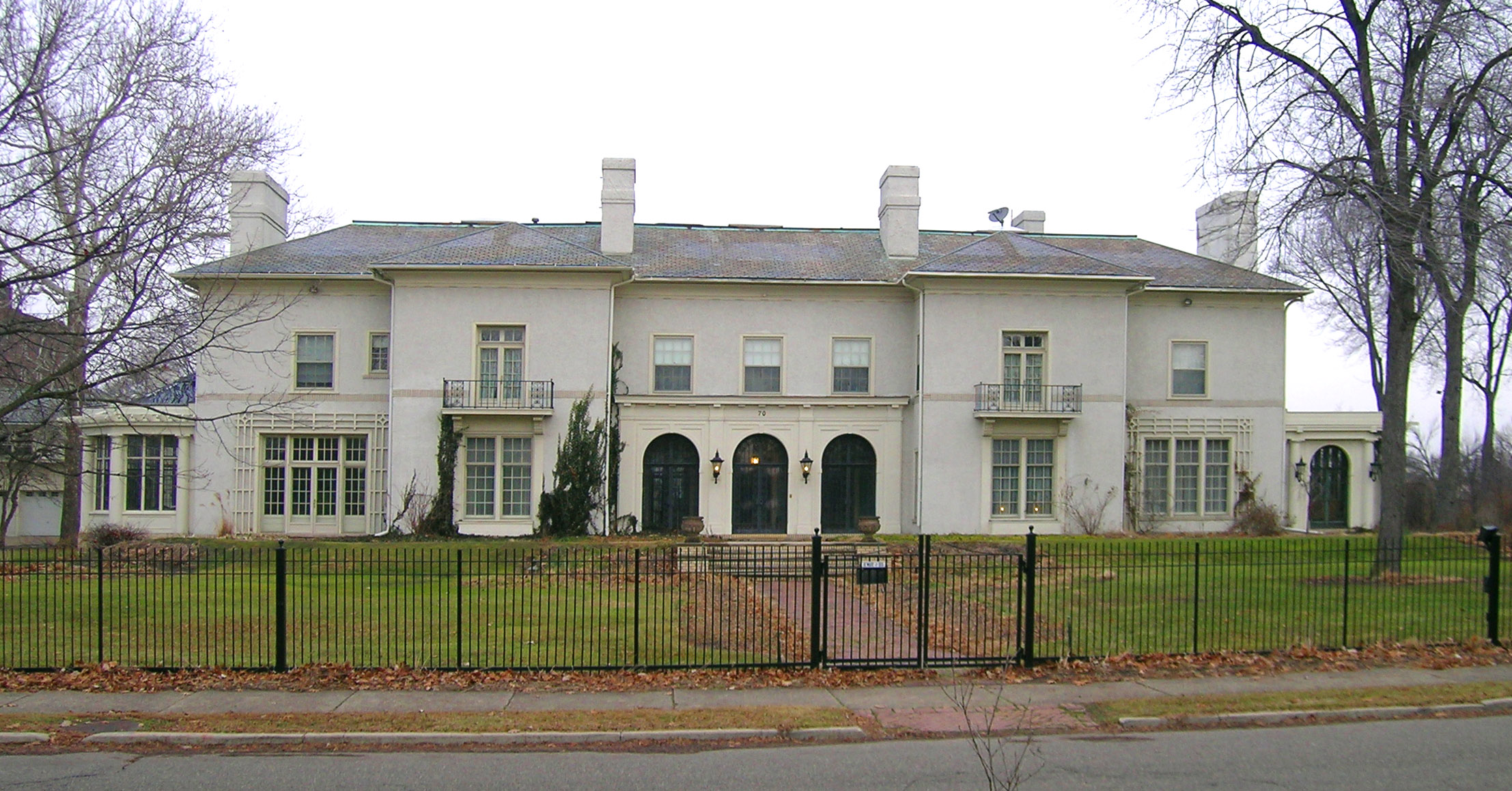
Kresge's house in Detroit's Boston-Edison Historic District.

Numerous places have been named after Kresge:

- The S.S. Kresge Learning Resource Center at Meharry Medical College, established through a grant from the Kresge Foundation
- The Kresge Eye Institute at Wayne State University, established through a grant from the Kresge Foundation
- The Kresge Science Complex at Albion College, in Albion, Michigan
- A street in Amherst, Ohio, Kresge Drive
- The southern tip of Pemaquid Point in New Harbor, Maine, Kresge Point (they had a summer house there)
- Kresge College, a residential college at the University of California, Santa Cruz
- The Kresge Auditorium at Bowdoin College
- The Kresge Auditorium at Olivet Nazarene University
- The Kresge Auditorium at the Massachusetts Institute of Technology
- The Kresge Auditorium at Stanford University, torn down in 2009
- The Kresge Auditorium at Interlochen Center for the Arts in Interlochen, Michigan
- The Kresge Auditorium at Indiana University at Kokomo - Kokomo, Indiana
- One of the theaters at Carnegie Mellon College of Fine Arts
- The Kresge Ford Building at College for Creative Studies in Detroit, Michigan
- The Kresge Library at Oakland University in Rochester, Michigan
- The Kresge Library at University of Michigan Ross School of Business
- The Kresge Memorial Library at Covenant College
- The Kresge Engineering Library at University of California, Berkeley
- The Kresge Auditorium at the Green Center for the Performing Arts [DePauw University, Greencastle, Indiana]
- The Kresge Physical Sciences Library at Dartmouth College
- Kresge Chapel on the campus of Claremont School of Theology
- Kresge Hall at Northwestern University, which currently houses the Weinberg College of Arts and Sciences
- Kresge Hall at Bentley University, a residence hall built in 1975
- Kresge Hall at Harvard Business School and the Kresge Building at the Harvard School of Public Health
- Kresge Hall at Metropolitan United Methodist Church
- Kresge Dining Hall at John Brown University
- The Kresge Law Library at the University of Notre Dame was funded, in part, by a grant from the Kresge Foundation.
- The Kresge Art Center at Michigan State University is his namesake.
- The Kresge School of Nursing at the University of Western Ontario was named after Kresge after he donated $200,000 in 1960.
- The Purdy-Kresge Library at Wayne State University.
- The Kresge Administration Building at Tuskegee University
- The Kresge Court at the Detroit Institute of Art in Detroit, Michigan
- YMCA Camp Kresge, owned and operated by the Wilkes-Barre Family YMCA in Wilkes-Barre, Pennsylvania
- Kresge Road, Lawrence, Kansas
