= Hollywood Toys & Costumes =

Toy and costume store in Los Angeles, California

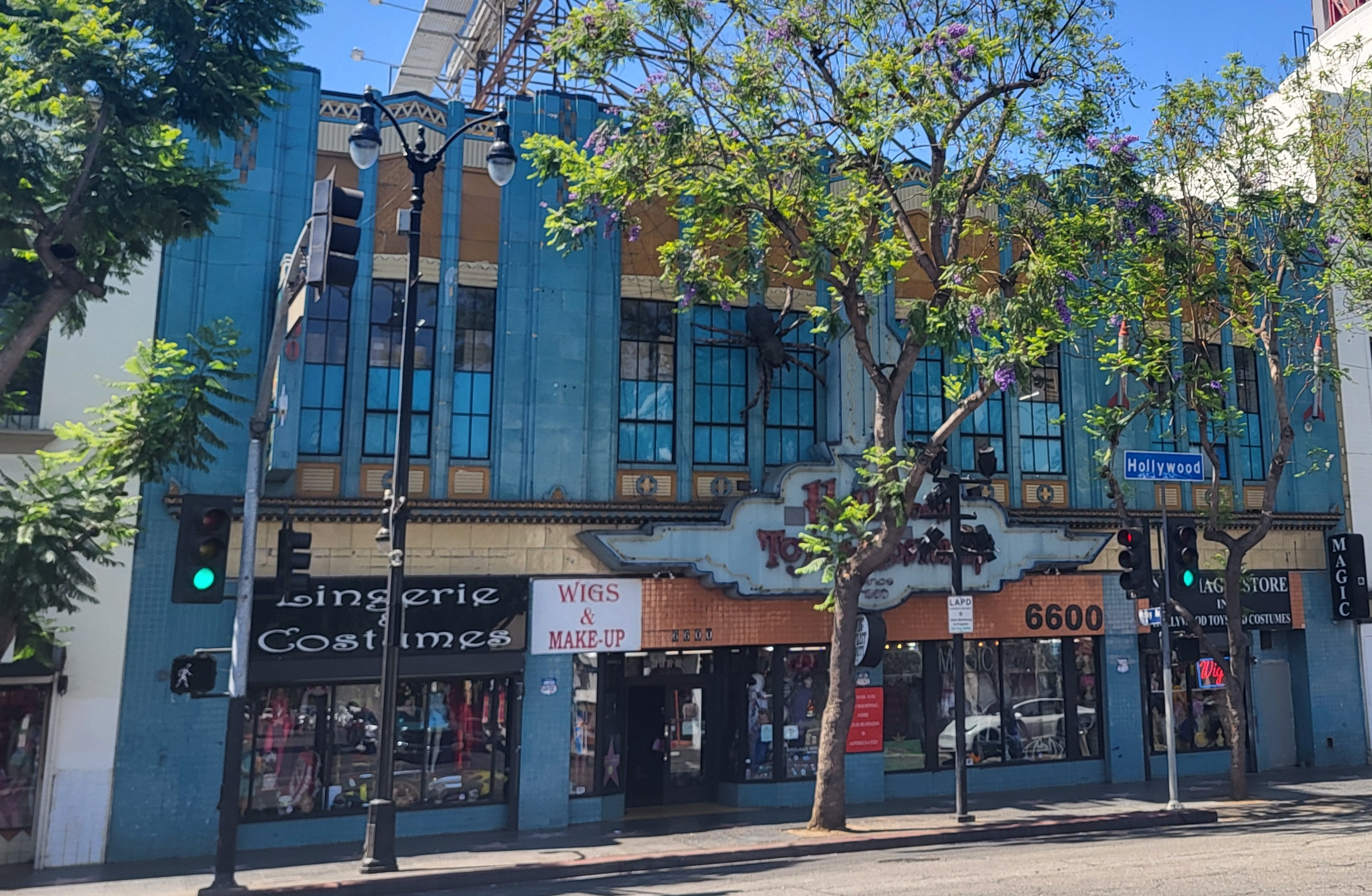
- The business in 2024
- Industry: Specialty retail
- Founded: 1950
- Founder: Ellowitz family
- Headquarters: Los Angeles, United States
- Number of locations: 1 store
- Area served: Los Angeles metropolitan area
- Owner: Ron Moazzez
- Website: hollywoodtoysandcostumes.com

Hollywood Toys & Costumes, originally Hollywood Toy Shop, is a toy and costume store located at 6600 W. Hollywood Boulevard in Hollywood, California. It is one of the few golden age of Hollywood era businesses that remain on the boulevard.

== History ==
Hollywood Toy Shop was founded by the Ellowitz family in 1950 and was originally located in the Hollywood Studio Building on Hollywood Boulevard in Los Angeles, California.

In 1980, the Ellowitz family sold the store to the Moazzez family, who then changed the name to Hollywood Toys and Costumes. In the early 1990s, the Moazzezes moved the store into the J. J. Newberry building, located one building west of its original location.

== Clientele ==
Hollywood Toys & Costumes has been frequented by many in the entertainment industry, including stars such as Michael Jackson, Paul Reubens, and Jimmy Kimmel. Additionally, Tim Burton, whose Hollywood Walk of Fame star is located directly outside the shop, has credited this business as one of his childhood inspirations.

== In popular culture ==
In 2021, Hollywood Toys & Costumes was featured in the paranormal reality television show Ghost Adventures.
