= J. J. Newberry =

Defunct American five and dime store chain

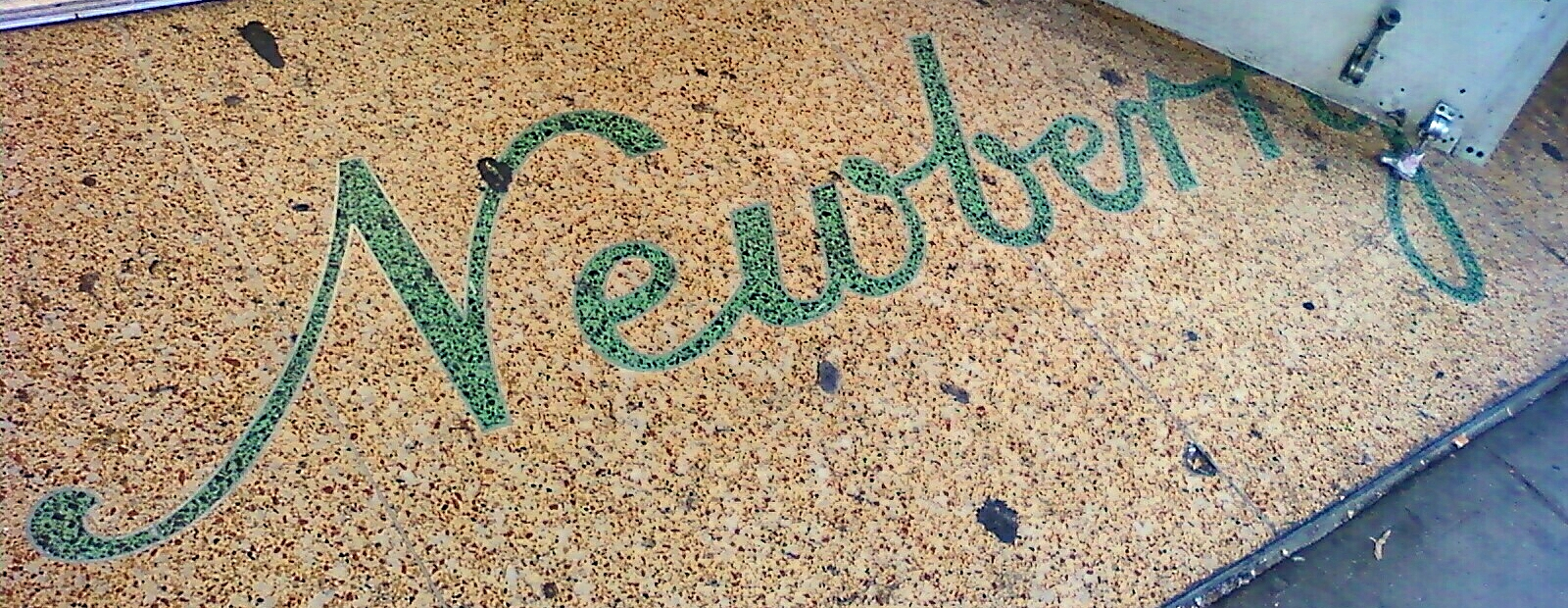
- Company logo in terrazzo floor at a former store in Los Angeles
- Company type: Variety store, Five and dime
- Founded: 1911 in Stroudsburg, Pennsylvania, U.S.
- Founder: John Josiah Newberry
- Defunct: 2002
- Fate: Bankrupt and Liquidated
- Successor: Dollar Zone (2001–02)
- Area served: Northeast, Southwest, West Coast, United States, Canada
- Parent: McCrory Stores Corporation (1972–2002)
- Subsidiaries: J. J. Newberry Canadian, Ltd.

J. J. Newberry's was an American five and dime store chain. It was founded in Stroudsburg, Pennsylvania, United States, in 1911 by John Josiah Newberry (1877–1954). J. J. Newberry learned the variety store business by working in stores for 17 years between 1894 and 1911. There were seven stores in the chain by 1918.

== John Josiah Newberry ==
John Josiah Newberry (September 26, 1877 – March 6, 1954) was born in Sunbury, Pennsylvania, Newberry first worked in the railroad business before joining retail store Fowler, Dick and Walker in 1894. In 1899, he joined S. H. Kress & Co. where he stayed until 1911.

He founded the J. J. Newberry chain of five and dime stores in Stroudsburg, Pennsylvania, in 1911. The first store was a success, and he opened a branch in Freeland, Pennsylvania in 1912. After 1919, he managed the company with his brothers Edgar A. Newberry and C.T. Newberry. At the time of Newberry's death (1954), the J. J. Newberry chain had 475 stores.

== J. J. Newberry Company ==
The company was a family business. J. J. Newberry was joined in management by his brothers C.T. Newberry and Edgar A. Newberry in 1919, at which time there were 17 stores with yearly sales of $500,000.

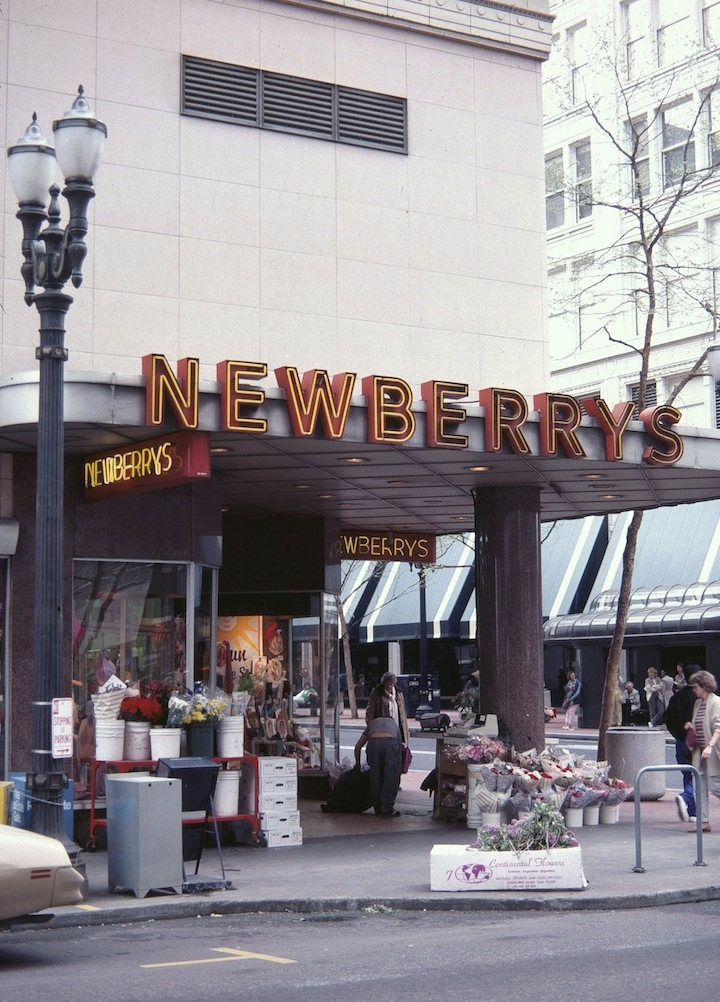
A 1988 photo of a Newberry's store in Portland, Oregon

Over the years, the Newberry chain acquired other stores including Hested in Wyoming, Missouri, Ohio, North Dakota, Colorado, and Nebraska, and Lee Stores in South Dakota, Minnesota, Maine, and Iowa. At the time of founder J. J. Newberry's death (1954), the chain had 475 stores. By 1961, the company operated 565 stores with total yearly sales of $291 million. The chain also operated a larger department store called Britt's Department Store.

McCrory Stores purchased the 439 unit J. J. Newberry Co. in 1972. McCrory Stores continued to operate it under the Newberry banner as a separate division. McCrory opened additional stores under the Newberry banner especially in the Northeast and California where the name had a strong presence. The company thrived throughout the 1980s but filed for Chapter 11 bankruptcy in 1992. In 1997, McCrory closed 300 stores including many in the Newberry's division.

== Bankruptcy & Liquidation ==
In 2000, most Newberry and McCrory stores had been converted to the Dollar Zone brand, as McCrory's attempted to radically change its business model. The remaining Newberry stores closed and the company was liquidated along with the whole McCrory's chain in February 2002.

Early J. J. Newberry stores featured a recognizable logo composed of gold or white sans serif letters on a red background that usually occupied the entire width of the store facade. This was similar to the early signage of competitors Woolworth's, Neisner Brothers and S. S. Kresge. Later stores featured a cursive 1960s modern logo style, dropping the "J. J." altogether.

Poet Donald Hall wrote a poem, "Beans and Franks", about the closing of a J. J. Newberry store in Franklin, New Hampshire.

== Britt's ==
Britt's was a division of J. J. Newberry. Founded in the Pacific Northwest in the early 1900s, the J. J. Newberry chain acquired it in December 1928 and all Britt's stores were rebranded as J. J. Newberry locations. Newberry revived the Britt's name in the early 1960s as a department store division (similar to AIM For The Best). During the Birmingham civil rights campaign, activists organized sit-ins at the segregated lunch counters in Britt's Department Stores, which led to the arrest of 20 protesters.

== See also ==
- J. J. Newberry (Los Angeles, California)

== Sources ==
- "Biography of J.J. Newberry". Rootsweb.com. Archived from the original on November 29, 2005.
- Dye, Elizabeth (July 31, 2001). "J.J. Newberry: A Eulogy". Willamette Week. Portland, Oregon. Archived from the original on June 9, 2016.
- Halper, Emanuel B. (2001). Shopping Center and Store Leases. Vol. 2. New York City: Law Journal Press. p. 175. ISBN 978-1588520036..
