= J. J. Newberry (Los Angeles, California) =

Building in Los Angeles, California

- U.S. Historic district – Contributing property
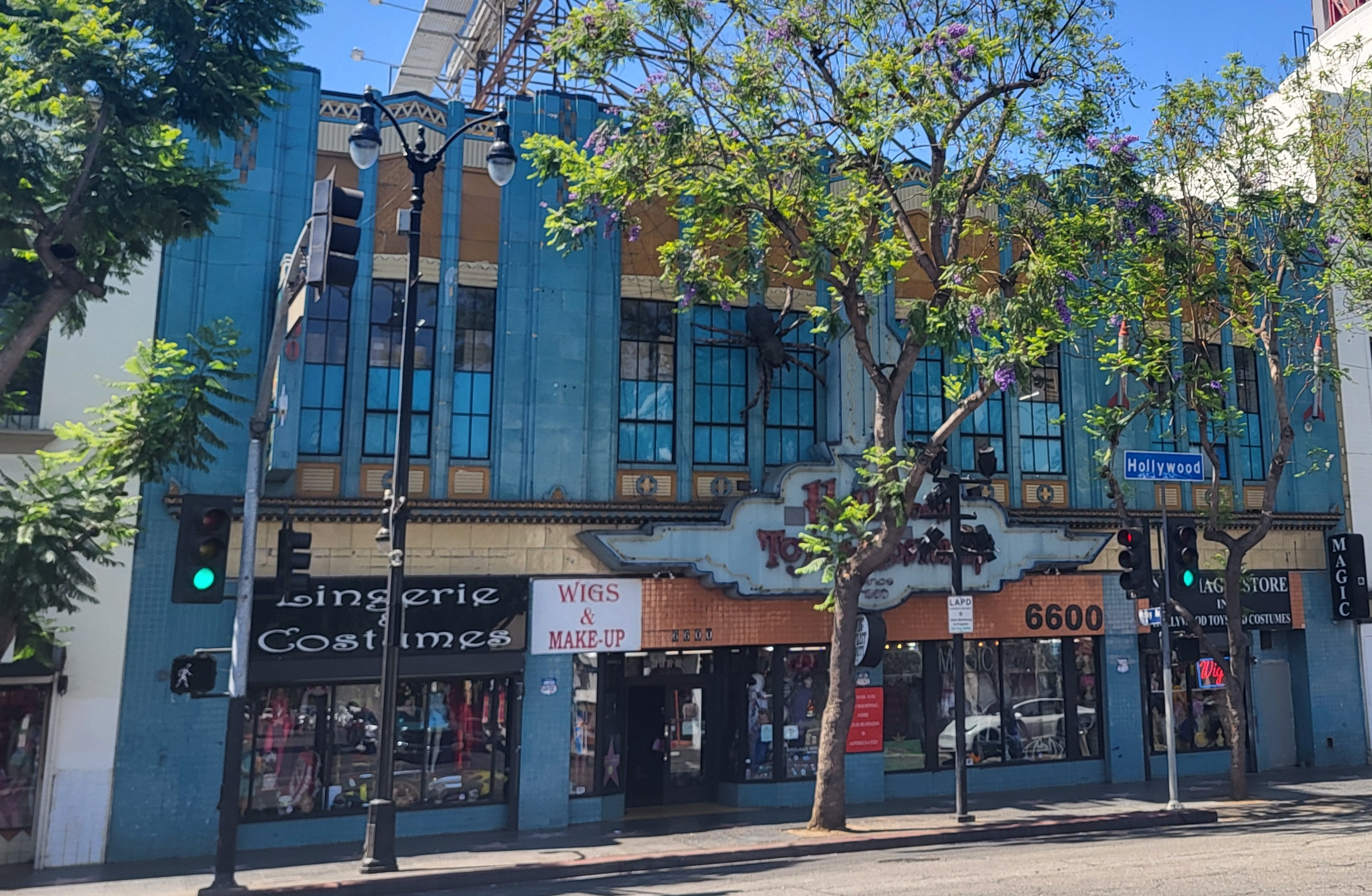
- The building in 2024

- Location within the Los Angeles metropolitan area
- Location: 6600 W. Hollywood Blvd. Hollywood, California
- Coordinates: 34.101°N 118.333°W
- Built: 1928
- Architectural style: Art Deco
- Part of: Hollywood Boulevard Commercial and Entertainment District (ID85000704)
- Designated CP: April 4, 1985

J. J. Newberry is a historic two-story building at 6600 W. Hollywood Blvd. in Hollywood, California. It is known primarily for its architecture, location, and its 30+ year tenant, Hollywood Toys & Costumes.

== History ==
Built in 1928, J. J. Newberry was designed by the namesake company's architectural staff.

In 1985, the Hollywood Boulevard Commercial and Entertainment District was added to the National Register of Historic Places, with this building listed as a contributing property in the district.

In the early 1990s, Hollywood Toys & Costumes relocated to this building, having been located one building east since 1950. In 2021, both the business and the building were featured in the paranormal reality television show Ghost Adventures.

== Architecture and design ==
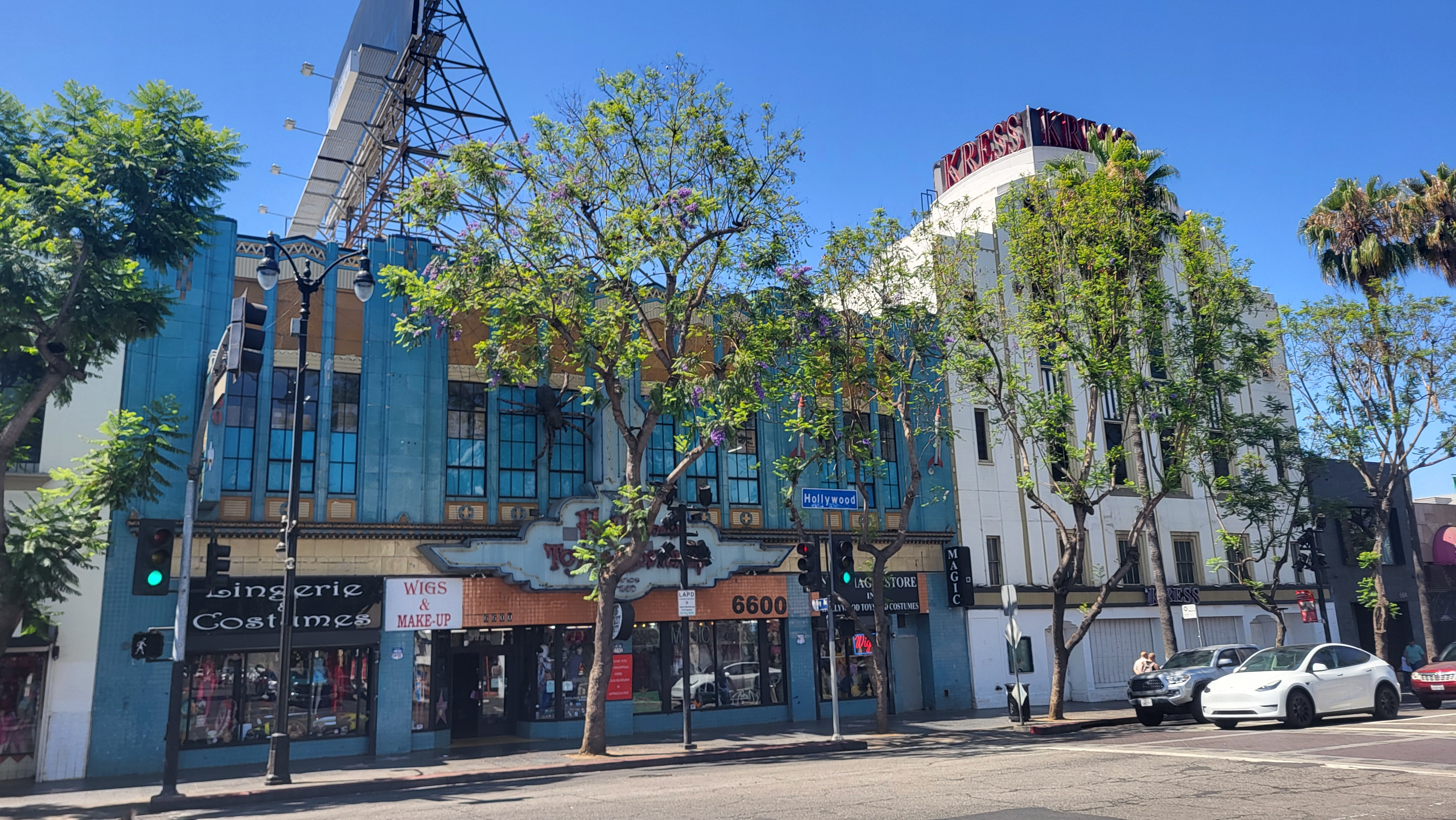
J.J. Newberry and its neighbor

J. J. Newberry is made of reinforced concrete and features an elaborate Art Deco facade. Peach vitrolite glass panels cover the first story, while the second story is divided into three bays, each of which is separated by vertical piers that are covered in turquoise glazed tile and project above the roof. The piers are not topped by capitals; instead checkerboard patterns pierce the tops of the piers. The bays feature industrial metal sash windows and are topped by zigzagged gold terra cotta panels embossed with overlapping squared-off curlicues. The parapet features yellow chevrons, while a beltcourse containing octagon medallions and stylized chevrons and fleur-de-lis separates the first and second stories.

The building combined with its neighbor is considered "one of the most colorful concentrations of Art Deco architecture on the Boulevard."

== In popular culture ==
This J. J. Newberry building served as the inspiration for the Celebrity 5 and 10 Building at Disney’s Hollywood Studios.

== See also ==
- List of contributing properties in the Hollywood Boulevard Commercial and Entertainment District
