= Metropolitan United Methodist Church =

Historic church in Michigan, United States

- U.S. National Register of Historic Places
- Michigan State Historic Site
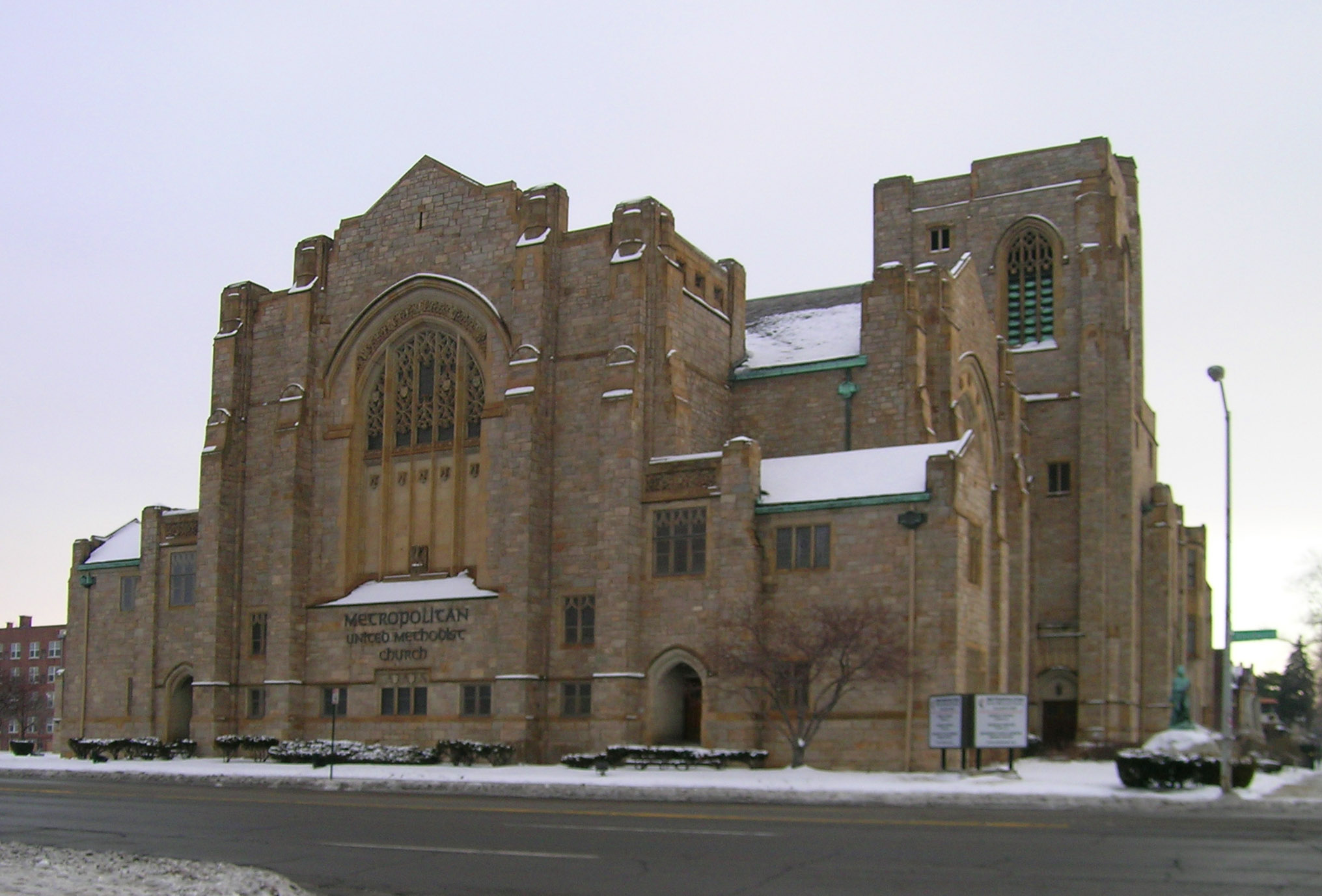
- Interactive map
- Location: 8000 Woodward Avenue; Detroit, Michigan
- Coordinates: 42°22′28.77″N 83°4′32.49″W
- Built: 1922–26
- Architect: William E. N. Hunter
- MPS: Religious Structures of Woodward Avenue TR
- NRHP reference No.: 82002904

Significant dates
- Added to NRHP: August 3, 1982
- Designated MSHS: October 23, 1986

The Metropolitan United Methodist Church is a church located at 8000 Woodward Avenue (at Chandler) in the New Center area of Detroit, Michigan. It was completed in 1926, listed on the National Register of Historic Places in 1982, and designated a Michigan State Historic Site in 1986. This church should not be confused with Metropolitan United Methodist Church in Washington, DC, which is often regarded as a National Church within the United States as it was specifically established by the General Conference to be a "representative presence of Methodism in the nation's capital".

== History ==
In 1901, two Detroit Methodist congregations, the Woodward Avenue Methodist Episcopal (founded in 1885) and the Oakland Avenue Church (founded in 1886), merged to form the North Woodward Avenue Methodist Church. Two years later, Dr. Charles Bronson Allen became pastor and convinced the congregation to construct a building at Woodward and Melbourne which burned down on Christmas Eve 1916. The congregation decided to rebuild grander than ever. One of the congregants, Sebastian S. Kresge (who lived nearby in Boston-Edison), donated land at Woodward and Chandler for a new building as well as offering substantial financial support. Another congregant, William E. N. Hunter, designed the structure, however, shortages of building materials and labor caused by World War I delayed construction. The cornerstone was finally laid June 4, 1922, and the first services were held in the completed sanctuary January 17, 1926. By the mid-1930s, the congregation was the largest local church in the Methodist world. Church membership peaked in 1943 at 7,300 members.

== Architecture ==
The church is a very large structure in the English Gothic style, built from a distinctive ochre granite from Massachusetts. It is built in a traditional cruciform design buttressed with several low side wings and a gabled roof. The sanctuary occupies the western half of the building while the eastern half contains an auditorium, offices and classrooms. A hallway on the main level separates the sanctuary from the auditorium. The walls of both spaces retract allowing up seating for up to 7,000 with a view of the chancel.

One curious feature, when viewing the building from the exterior, is that the lower half of the chancel window is filled with stone rather than glass. This is to allow for display of a large tapestry on the church's interior.

The church is painted throughout by the artist George Boget. Three murals on the second floor crush hall depict scenes from the history of Protestantism and Methodism. They are entitled "The Dawn of Reformation," "John Wesley Preaching on His Father's Tomb," and "Francis Asbury, Apostle of the Long Trail." A winding tree motif ties these murals together with smaller symbolic imagery painted into the vaulted ceilings on the first and second floor corridors, as well as large murals in Kresge Hall, the auditorium. These murals show smaller scenes of Methodist and Metropolitan History tied into the "family tree" that binds the congregation together.

In 1970, Stanley and Dorothy Kresge donated $194,000 for the Merton S. Rice Memorial Organ, named for the former pastor. They contributed an additional $10,000 for structural modifications to house the pipe chambers. The organ is opus 10641 of the M. P. Moller Organ Company. The organ incorporated some pipes from an earlier instrument by Austin Organs, Inc. and at installation, contained 6,849 pipes in 119 ranks. In subsequent years, it has been enlarged to 7,003 pipes and 121 ranks, making it the second largest pipe organ in the state of Michigan.
