= Purdy-Kresge Library =

Library in Detroit, Michigan

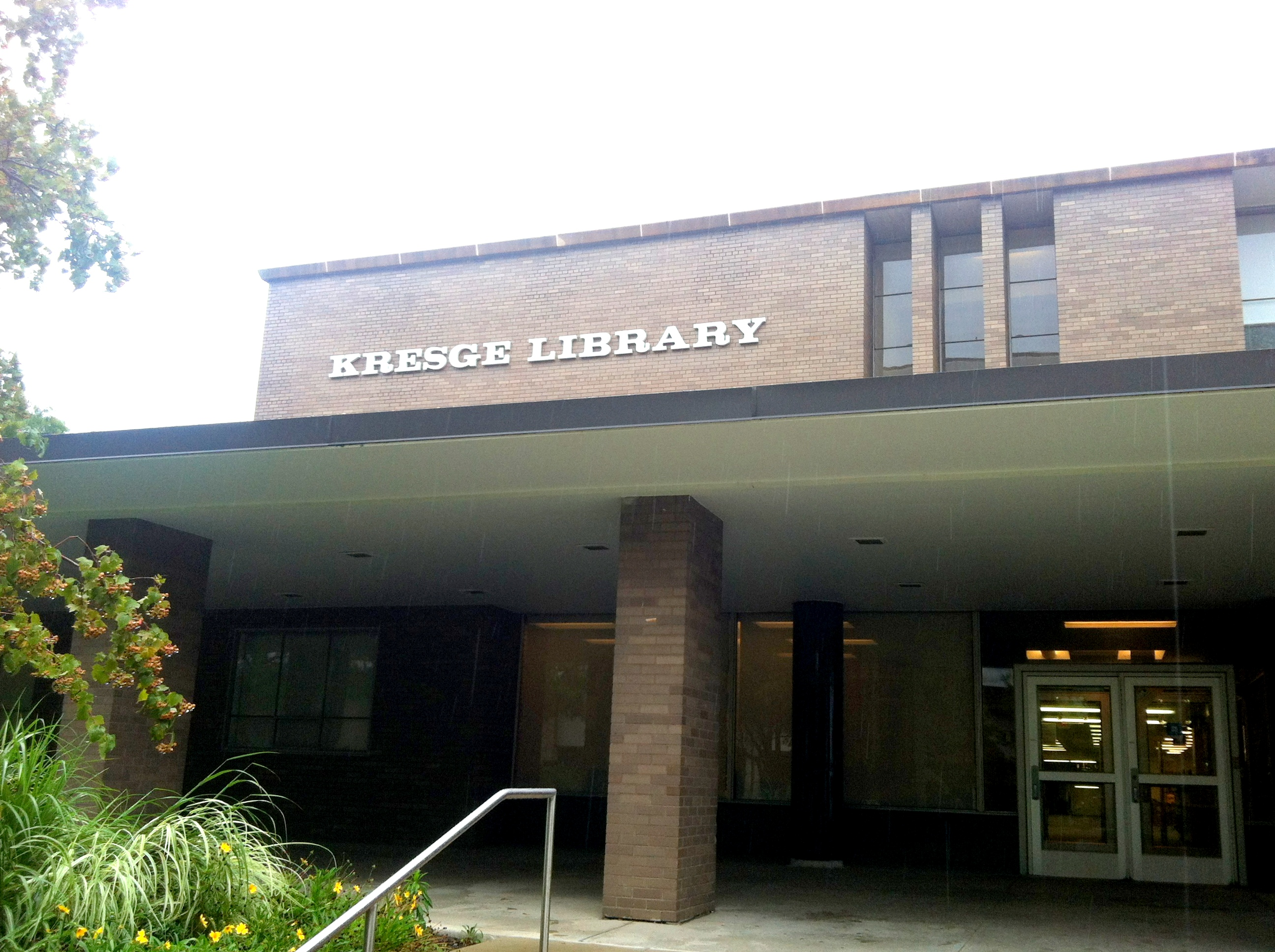
- Purdy-Kresge Library on WSU main campus
- 42°21′16″N 83°4′2″W42°21′16″N 83°4′2″W
- Location: Detroit, Michigan

Purdy-Kresge Library is a library on the main campus of Wayne State University and is the main research library for the social sciences, humanities, arts education, and business fields. The library is located at 5265 Cass Ave Detroit, Michigan 48202, across the street from the Detroit Public Library. Originally constructed as two separate libraries connected by a single hallway in 1950, the library is now known as one library. The Purdy/Kresge Library offers a traditional library atmosphere, housing a large print collection as well as over 60 computers, and ample study space.

== History ==
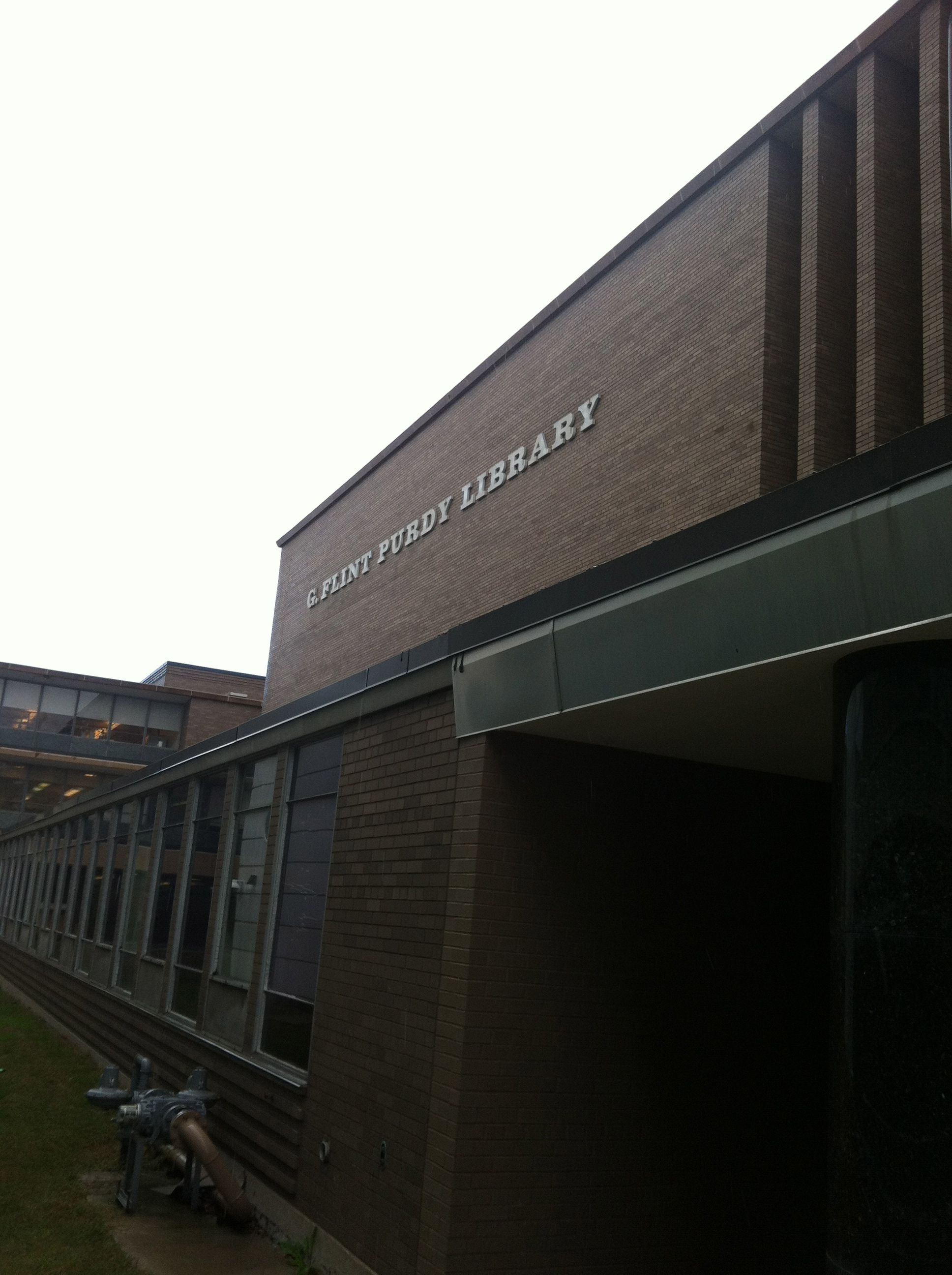
G. Flint Purdy Library

In 1950s The Kresge Foundation donated a large sum of money that aided in the construction of a science library. Therefore, the construction of a science library corresponded with the plans of Dr. G. Flint Purdy's for a library, so both libraries were built at the same time.

For almost 60 years, the Purdy Library has been the foundation of Wayne State University. The history of the Wayne State University Libraries is the story of Dr. G. Flint Purdy. Purdy received a Bachelor of Arts degree from Iowa State Teacher's College and a Bachelor of Science degree from Columbia University. After receiving his Ph.D. from the University of Chicago, he joined Wayne State University in 1936 as the Director of Libraries. Purdy was the motivation for the General Library on campus, which served as a library of the Detroit Normal Training School, a forerunner of the College of Education. The Detroit Normal Training School gathered a collection of professional materials for student teachers; this paved the way for the future education library, which grew until it was the largest collections of educational materials in the nation.

In 1930, when Central Michigan University was created by the union of the Detroit Junior College and the Detroit Teachers College it moved into the main building of Central High School (Detroit) which received the name Old Main. In 1931, after the Detroit Teachers College moved to Old Main, the faculty members Dr. Gertha Williams, Mrs. Lois Place, and Miss Eloise Ramsey came together to start an education laboratory. The lab acted as functional classrooms in a library setting that aided teachers with the supplies to help children to read. In 1933, Purdy was hired in as the University Librarian and he agreed about the use of the classroom setting in the library. Later in 1949, Purdy pushed for separate buildings for the crowded library at Old Main. In his plan he wanted to continue the division of the library into Humanities, Social Sciences and Education and make materials accessible to students and faculty. Continuing with the Education Division, he worked with the College of Education on library materials; Purdy recommended a general curricular reading area, storage for audio-visual materials, seminar rooms, and open-shelf textbook collections. He envisioned a place where students, faculty and the community teachers could keep abreast of current teaching methods.

By the 1930s, the Education Library was declining so a plan was constructed to combine all divisions into one general library. The merger began with the renovation of the General Library which was renamed the Purdy Kresge Library and all services were stationed on the first floor. In September 1969, Purdy passed but his name will live on at Wayne State University. In 1972, the Wayne State Board of Governors supported the renaming of the General Library as the G. Flint Purdy Library because of his dedication to libraries and Wayne State University.

The Purdy-Kresge Library is also named after Sebastian S. Kresge. Kresge was the founder of the S.S. Kresge Company. The company started with a five and ten cent store that opened in 1899 in Downtown Detroit and now there are thousands of K-mart stores in the U.S. and in other countries. Also being a successful business man Kresge was a philanthropist. When The Kresge Foundation was founded in 1924, he thought his gains would be able to better mankind. The Kresge Foundation has donated millions of dollars to many colleges and organizations but the foundation is also known as a “bricks and mortar” foundation because it helped institutions and non-profit organizations. In 1949, the trustees of The Kresge Foundation offered Wayne State University one million dollars to build a science building and the foundation awarded more than $200,000 to the University for medical research and other specialized services.

The library houses many special collections including the Ramsey Collection of Children's Literature and the Office for Teaching and Learning.

== See also ==
- Wayne State University Libraries
