= McCrory Stores =

American store chain

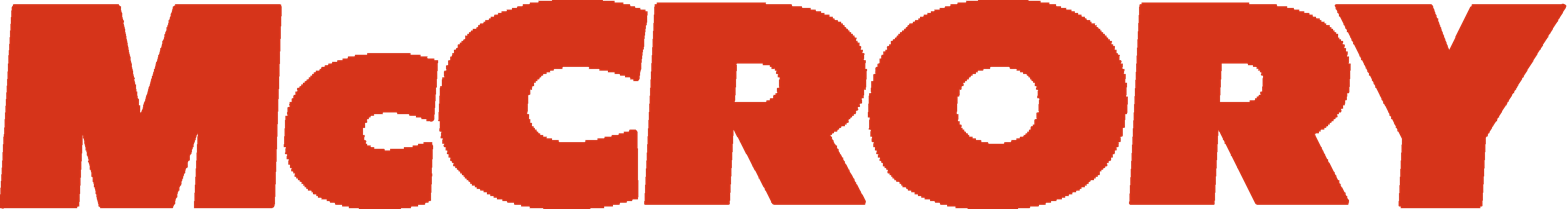

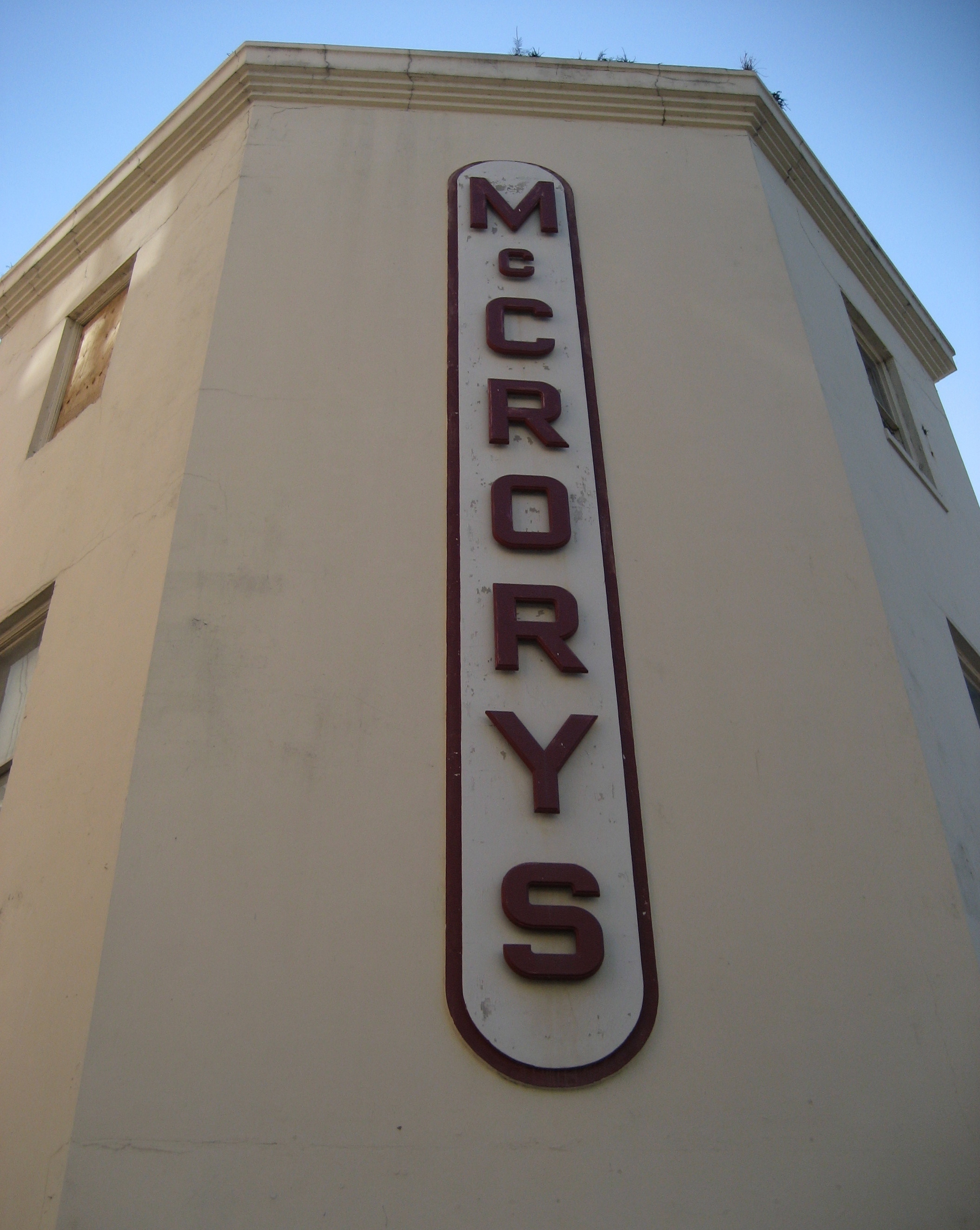
- Industry: Five and dime stores
- Founded: 1882; 144 years ago
- Founder: John Graham McCrorey
- Defunct: 2002; 24 years ago
- Fate: Filed for bankruptcy and liquidated
- Subsidiaries: J.J. Newberry; TG&Y; G.C. Murphy; McLellan stores H.L. Green; S. H. Kress & Co.

McCrory Stores or J.G. McCrory's was a chain of five and dime stores in the United States based in York, Pennsylvania. The stores typically sold shoes, clothing, housewares, fabrics, penny candy, toys, cosmetics, and often included a lunch counter or snack bar.

== Founding ==
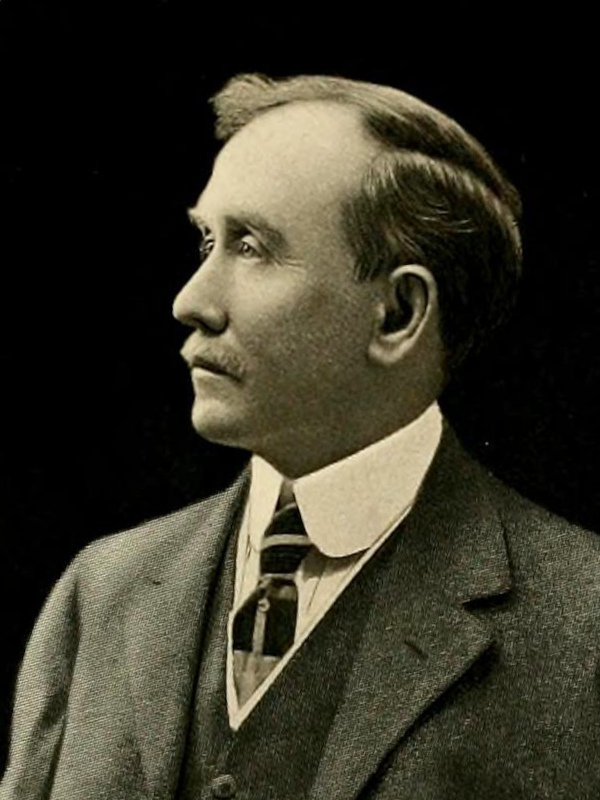
Founder John G. McCrory

The retailer John McCrorey opened his first McCrory store in Scottdale, Pennsylvania, in 1882. By 1885, the J. G. McCrory Company had five stores in Pennsylvania. McCrorey dropped the e from his last name to avoid paying for extra letters on his store signs. One of his policies was to only pay a reasonable price for store locations.

One of McCrorey's early investors was Sebastian Kresge, who later founded the S.S. Kresge chain. This chain would become Kmart in 1962. In 1899, Kresge traded his interest in the Memphis, Tennessee, McCrory store for the Detroit, Michigan, one, giving him control there. In 1915, the J. G. McCrory Company became McCrory Stores Corporation.

In 1921, McCrory Stores became the exclusive retailer of Oriole Records, a popular record label during the 1920s and 1930s. By 1925, approximately two thirds of the McCrory stores were leased, with the remainder owned by the McCrory Realty Corporation. The retailer's gross sales approached $30 million by the mid-1920s, when it operated 187 stores.

In 1929, a furnace explosion at a McCrory store in Washington, D.C. killed six people and injured 50 more.

In 1933, during the Great Depression, McCrory Stores, now with 244 stores, entered bankruptcy protection. The company was dissolved, but was eventually re-established as McCrory Stores and resumed operations. John McCrory died in 1943.

== History ==
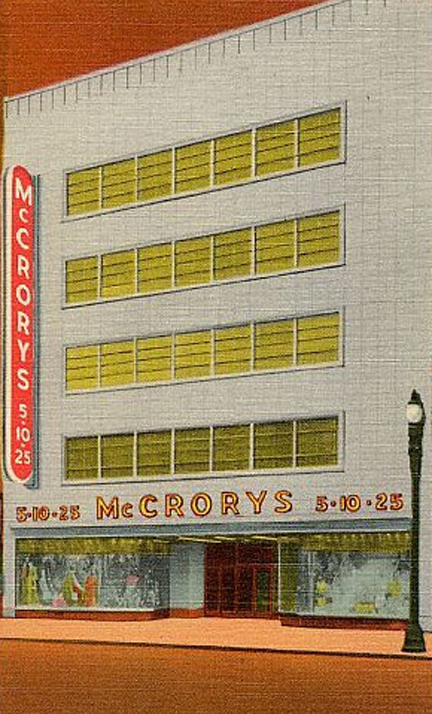
McCrory's in Syracuse, NY

At its height, McCrory's operated 1,300 stores under its own name and as TG&Y, McLellan (merged in 1958), H. L. Green, Silvers, G.C. Murphy, J.J. Newberry and Otasco, which it had acquired through the years. McCrory's parent Rapid-American also owned Lerner Stores and National Shirt (acquired by McCrory's in 1960).

The Israeli financier Meshulam Riklis purchased McCrory in 1960 and merged it with the rival H.L.Green Co., moving its headquarters to Springettsbury Township, Pennsylvania, in 1963. At the time, it was the fourth largest retailer in the United States. Riklis controlled McCrory's through the Rapid-American holding company, which was managed by Samuel Neaman. Riklis was known for shifting assets between his companies and holding companies, which is best exemplified by his handling of McCrory Stores, driving the brand name into bankruptcy while keeping the assets. Among the retailers controlled by McCrory's at the time were Best & Co., Lerner Shops, and S. Klein.

McCrory continued to grow during the 1960s and '70s. It purchased the 439 store J.J. Newberry Company in 1972. It operated Newberry as a separate division and continued to open stores under that name.

On January 1, 1981, McCrory purchased the S.H. Kress & Co., a five and dime chain, from Genesco, a footwear retailer. As the economic expansion of the 1980s progressed, McCrory continued to expand and remodel stores as volume and profits grew exponentially.

McCrory purchased the TG&Y Discount store chain in 1985. This proved to be a difficult transition for McCrory. Many TG&Y stores were larger than the typical 10,000 to 15,000 square foot McCrory store, and the merchandise mix was very different. The TG&Y stores were not profitable and a drain on corporate assets. McCrory converted many of the TG&Y stores to the Bargain Time brand. They were closed by the end of the decade.

In 1987, McCrory purchased the 76 remaining Kresge and Jupiter stores from Kmart and converted all of them to the McCrory brand. In 1989, McCrory purchased GC Murphy Co, a variety story chain, from Ames Department Stores. The purchase included the remaining GC Murphy Stores and Bargain World Stores.

== Decline ==
By 1989, McCrory was operating 1,300 stores. However, the changing retail landscape including the migrating of shoppers from the inner cities to the influx of superstores run by Target Corporation and Walmart had diminished the competitiveness of five and dime stores. In 1991, McCrory closed 229 stores and laid off 2,000 employees. The company filed for Chapter 11 bankruptcy in 1992. At that time, it had 820 McCrory, Kresge and J. J. Newberry stores with 17,000 employees.

In 1997, McCrory's closed 300 of its last 460 stores. The company also converted some stores to their Dollar Zone format of dollar store, but these closed in early 2002.

In September 2001, McCrory filed for Chapter 11 bankruptcy for the second time in nine years. In December 2001, McCrory announced that the remaining McCrory, TG&Y, G. C. Murphy and J.J. Newberry stores would begin liquidation. In February 2002, McCrory Stores ceased operation.
