= TG&Y =

American variety store chain

- Logo used from late 1980s to 2002

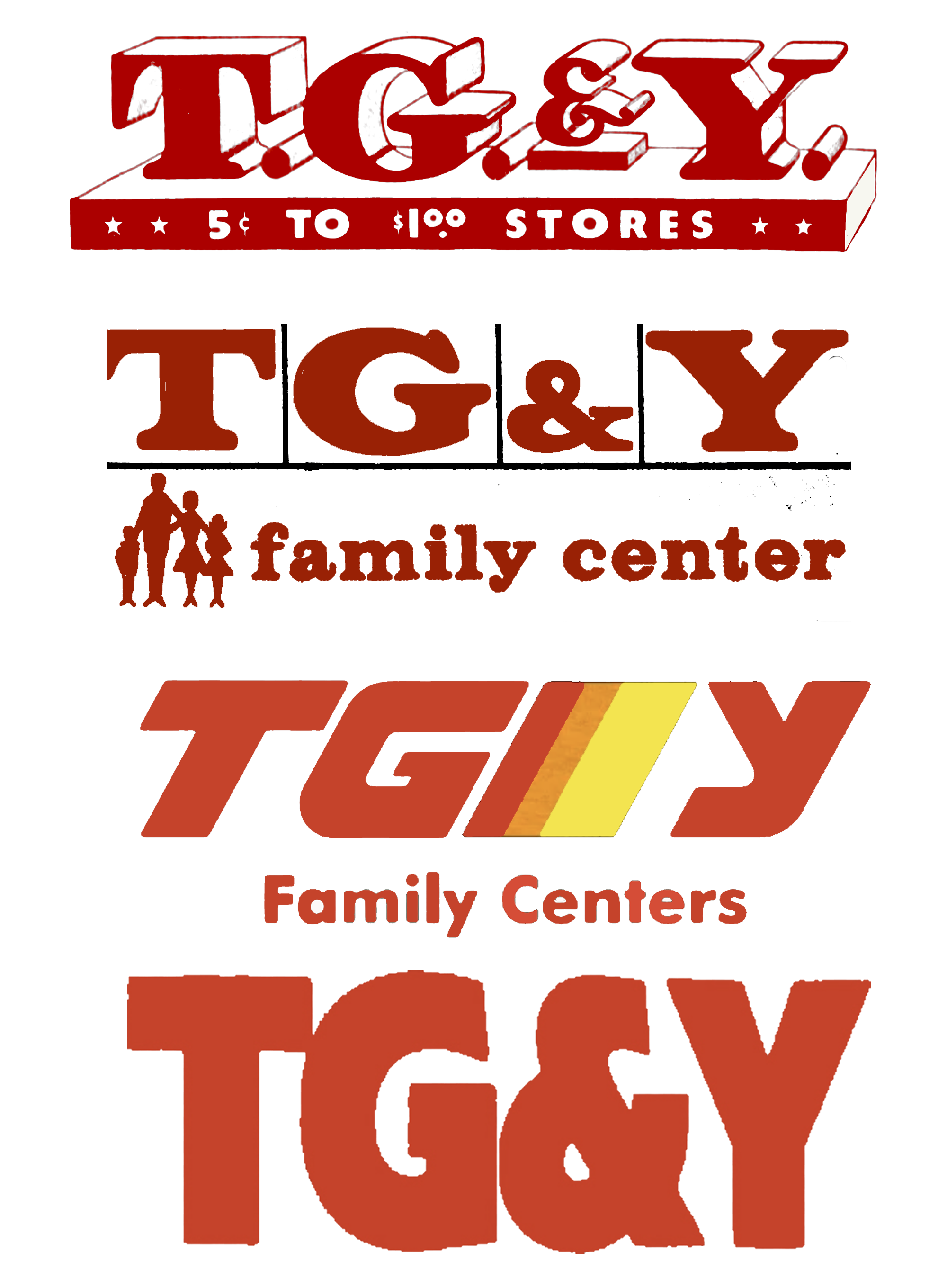
- TG&Y 1950s logo (not renewed), 1970/1 logo (not renewed), 1983/4 logo (not renewed), late 1980s logo (not registered)
- Type: Variety store chain
- Industry: Retail sales
- Founded: 1935
- Founder: Rawdon E. Tomlinson, Enoch L. "Les" Gosselin, and Raymond A. Young
- Defunct: February 2002
- Fate: Liquidated
- Headquarters: Oklahoma City, United States
- Owner: McCrory Stores, Inc. (1986–2002)
- Parent: Butler Brothers (1957–1960); City Products Corporation (1960–1966); Household Finance Corporation (1967–1985); McCrory Stores, Inc. (1986–2002)

TG&Y was a American five-and-dime and variety store chain based in Oklahoma City. At its peak, there were more than 900 stores in 29 states. Starting out during the Great Depression in rural areas and eventually moving into cities, TG&Y stores were firmly embedded in southern culture as modern-day general stores with a bit of everything. The chain used the advertising slogan, "Your best buy is at TG&Y." The founders articulated their business philosophy as "...have what people want at a price they can afford to pay."

== History ==
Founded in 1935, the chain was headquartered in Oklahoma City and named for the last initials of its three founders: Rawdon E. Tomlinson, Enoch L. "Les" Gosselin, and Raymond A. Young. The three men each owned separate variety stores in Oklahoma when they met at a trade show in 1932. (Note: Tomlinson's operations had been based in Frederick, Oklahoma, Gosselin's in Cordell, Oklahoma and Young's in Kingfisher, Oklahoma.) In 1935, the three pooled their financial resources to form the Central Merchandising Corporation and built a warehouse in Oklahoma City, allowing their stores to buy merchandise in bulk directly from manufacturers, instead of through wholesalers. They opened their first jointly owned store in 1936. The owners' initials were ordered according to the ages of the three, with Tomlinson being the oldest. Raymond Young, the only partner remaining with the chain, oversaw operations until his retirement in 1970. (Note: Tomlinson died in 1947 and Gosselin died in 1977.) Gosselin's 35 stores were the last to rebrand from his Gosselin's Store moniker to TG&Y 5¢ to $1 Stores.

In 1957, the 125-store TG&Y chain was acquired by Butler Brothers of Chicago, with the stipulation that Young's leadership remain unchanged. After Young's retirement, leadership changed frequently. By this time, there were 127 retail stores. By 1960, the entire TG&Y operation had become a wholly owned subsidiary of City Products, a Chicago-based company which already operated other variety stores. City Products tried out a big-box store approach branded as a TG&Y Family Center. A 1961 Wall Street Journal article explained the "broad transformation" of the entire variety and dime store industry that was taking place as City Products was trying to update TG&Y's image.

TG&Y's Family Center served as the company's first anchor tenant or anchor store in shopping centers as opposed to their secondary, interior stores and downtown locations that existed previously. City Products approach on TG&Y was similar to variety chains Woolworth's big box Woolco store and S.S. Kresge and W.T. Grant strategy with Kmart and Grant City anchor stores with food and drugs. The first two Family Center branded stores were in Oklahoma and were the first to have expanded food and drug departments. The 60,000 square foot store in Oklahoma City's Southern Hills Shopping Center was by far the chain's largest and most expensive store at $4 million.

In the Fall of 1965, Household Finance Corporation (HFC) acquired City Products and HFC then also controlled Coast to Coast Hardware and Ben Franklin stores. HFC would continue its aggressive national growth of TG&Y Family Center strategy over the smaller variety stores. In 1975, David Green left a supervisor job at TG&Y to open the second location in what would become the Hobby Lobby chain of arts and crafts stores, also based in Oklahoma City.

In 1986, when it had over 700 stores, TG&Y was acquired by competitor McCrory Stores. McCrory was a division of Rapid-American Corporation, a holding company that owned several retail chains. At the time, Rapid-American was solely owned by businessman and money manager Meshulam Riklis. For a brief period, McCroy / Rapid allowed TG&Y to remain an independent subsidiary retaining its Oklahoma base and employees; that decision was rethought as the company reorganized which, in turn, would begin TG&Y's descent.

At its peak, the chain had nearly 1000 stores in 29 states, from Florida to California.

== Demise ==
After its heyday in the 1960s, unsuccessful attempts were made to expand and rebrand TG&Y under the trade names TG&Y Dollar, Aim for the Best, and Dollar-T. In 1981, under intense pressure especially from Walmart and Kmart, TG&Y began closing large market Family Center locations while focusing on upgrading and rebranding existing stores in less competitive markets. The larger city stores of around 30,000 to 40,000 square feet were among the first to be eliminated failing to compete against their larger big box counterparts.

By March 1986, McCrory announced that it would sell about 200 of the 743 TG&Y operations it had so recently acquired. Shortly after acquiring the struggling chain, McCrory's cut over 8,000 TG&Y employees and closed 205 stores, including 23 in its former home state of Oklahoma. McCrory's filed for Chapter 11 bankruptcy in 1992 forcing further reductions in TG&Y stores, as well as McCrory, Kresge and J. J. Newberry stores within its portfolio of just over 800 stores. In a five-year period from 1992 to 1997 and during its Chapter 11 bankrputcy, McCrory would close 600 stores leaving it with just under 200 total stores. In 2001 TG&Y's owner McCrory Stores announced it would liquidate its entire portfolio of Dollar Zone, McCrory, G.C. Murphy, J.J. Newberry, and TG&Y. stores effective February 2002. Raymond Young, the youngest and last survivor of the three founders, died in the same year on March 23, 2002.

== Legacy ==
In January, 2014, the Chisholm Trail Museum of Kingfisher, Oklahoma put on an exhibit commemorating the TG&Y chain, featuring music, merchandise and other displays from its "golden era." The Kingfisher store had opened in 1927. Adam Lynn, museum director, was evidently surprised by the popularity of the exhibit, which had been scheduled to run only through March. He said that over one thousand former employees from as far away as Kansas and Texas had visited this exhibit, which the museum had extended until August of that year. He noted that all the former employees had expressed that they loved working at the store and that they would have continued working there until retirement if the company had not gone out of business. The museum later decided to make the exhibit permanent, and won the "Leadership in History Award of Merit" from the American Association for State and Local History.

A former TG&Y manager, Tom Clinton, decided to open a new version of the old store on January 6, 2003, in Sapulpa, Oklahoma. His opportunity arose when he learned in 2001 that the last TG&Y had closed. He bought the rights to the company name and a former Drug Warehouse building, which provided 12,000 square feet (1,100 m^{2}) of space. The short-lived store's emphasis was on craft items and household goods, but aisles contained food products, toys, pet supplies, stationery, yarn, ceramics, tools and hardware, and health and beauty aids.

== See also ==
- McCrory Stores
- Meshulam Riklis
- Clyde's Supermarket and T.G.&Y. in Oklahoma City
