= Skaggs Institute of Retail Management =

The Skaggs Institute of Retail Management at the Brigham Young University Marriott School of Management was established in 1976 by means of a founding grant by American Stores and its founder, Sam Skaggs. Initial funding was a ten-year, $1.8 million commitment which was managed by its founding Director, E. Doyle Robison, a talented retail professional who had established his credentials in Manhattan. (The Skaggs financial commitment was later extended at an annual giving rate of $125,000 through 1992.)

The Skaggs Institute of Retail Management was one of the first academic retail institutes in the nation, founded in 1976. Its mission was to be the premier source of retail management talent in the nation, to be a leading producer of useful retail research, and to provide programs to meet the needs of the retail industry.

Under the direction of Robison, the Institute received a good deal of recognition. During its years up through the early 1990s an Arthur Young survey of retail chief executive officers listed Brigham Young University among the top four universities as a source of business talent. A National Retail Federation study concluded that retail companies “typically recruit from at least three schools, with Brigham Young University being particularly popular.” The Skaggs Institute of Retail Management received the “Western Electric Fund Award” for having the most innovative program among colleges of business. Articles in Stores and Home Center magazines identified the Institute as one of two premier retail programs in the United States. Monitor magazine named the Institute as one of the top three retailing programs in the country.

In 1991, Robison left Brigham Young University to serve as president of the England Mission, a Latter-day Saint missionary center based in London. The Institute was capably managed by a new director, Professor Heikki Rinne, a Professor of Marketing at BYU's Marriott School of Management, and a consultant to the retail industry. Under his direction the Skagg's National Advisory Board played an ever greater role. In 1993 Professor Rinne left Brigham Young University to accept a position as CEO of the Halton Group of companies.

== The Institute of Retail Management ==
In January 1993 and shortly following the death of Sam Skaggs, the American Stores’ funding ceased. This required the Institute to seek new sourcing for its budget, which was accomplished under new direction and a new name.

The new director, Professor William R. Swinyard, was no stranger to retailing. He had frequently published in marketing and retail academic journals, and was Holder of the Fred G. Meyer Chair of Retailing at BYU (established through a $1 million grant from the Meyer Memorial Trust). The Skaggs Institute was renamed as, The Institute of Retail Management, and financial support was provided by a "National Advisory Board" of significant retailing leaders.

For example, its 1993 National Advisory Board (NAB) was composed of the following individuals:

Ken Woodrow, President, Target Stores (and NAB Chair)
Suzanne Allford, Senior Vice President, Walmart/Sam’s Club
G. Kent Burnett, Chairman & CEO, Dillard's SW Division
Marjorie Holmes, Sr. Vice President, Mervyn's
John Cody, President, JCPenney Stores
Jed Norden, Senior Vice President, Payless ShoeSource
John Kyees, Executive Vice President of Finance, Express
John McMillan, Co-chairman, Nordstrom
David Schuvie, Divisional Vice President, Kmart
Ron McEvoy, Senior Vice President and CIO, Fred Meyer Stores
Alan Stewart, Retail Food Consultant
Dan Sweeney, Vice Chairman, Price Waterhouse

The National Advisory Board’s objectives were to assist the Institute in reaching its primary goals, increase student awareness of retailing, recommend appropriate research or seminar topics, and to critique and recommend improvements for institute programs.

Under the National Advisory Board’s and Swinyard's direction the Institute’s mission became:

1. Increase the quantity and quality of young people entering the retail field, reduce the time required for a new trainee to become an effective part of the management team, and reduce the turnover rate among management trainees.
2. Produce research that meets the demands of technological and management progress in retailing.
3. Produce workshops and seminars on and off campus to assist in meeting the needs of retail management and increasing the students' understanding of current management problems as well as long-range social issues.

Programs offered by the newly defined Institute included retail career initiatives, executive lectures, retail executive panel discussions, seminars and workshops, classroom visits by retail professionals, scholarships and awards, symposia, and faculty research on retailing (funded in 1988 through a $500,000 endowment by the JCPenney Company). Both Retail recruitment and student response was enthusiastic and student response to them was

== The Institute of Marketing ==
The Institute leadership changed again in 1997 when William D. Price assumed direction of the organization, with Professor Swinyard continuing as its Academic Director. Bill Price had been the president of Fuji Film's western film developing division.

In 1998 as the attractiveness of retailing as a career among BYU's students began to diminish, the Institute was renamed and its mission revised to become the Institute of Marketing, which continued a broadened thrust first started in 1976.
