= Skaggs family =

American family

The Skaggs Family, starting from a small frontier town in southern Idaho, came to have an important impact on merchandising across much of the United States. During most of the 20th century, the Skaggs name was prominent on hundreds of stores throughout the West and Midwest.

The origins of a wide range of these grocery and drug store enterprises can be traced to this one Skaggs family. The father in the family was a Baptist minister and had moved west for a better climate. He had a large family; to supplement his income he opened a grocery store. He and six of his sons, with varying degrees of collaboration, introduced in the early 20th century two important changes in merchandising: the low-margin, cash-and-carry approach to business, and rapidly growing a multitude of common outlets, now called chain stores. Their entrepreneurial interests became a major retailing force resulting in large, retail chains that carried not only the Skaggs name itself, but names like Safeway, Osco, PayLess, Albertsons, Longs Drug Stores, Katz and others.

== Biography ==
Circa 1887 Samuel M. Skaggs, with his wife Nancy (E. Long) and two of his brothers and their families, moved from Tennessee to Missouri.[2,8] There Sam tried farming and managed a store and post office in Cato, Missouri. Between 1888 and 1900 he entered the Baptist Ministry and by 1900 settled in Newton County, Missouri. At the time of their move from Tennessee, Sam and Nancy had five children; in Missouri they had 10 more. Of the first 11 children, 9 were alive in 1900. (Note: Because of the Skaggs brothers' many different commercial interests and their propensity to buy and sell those interests, the following chronology presents a difficult-to-unravel entanglement. As such, it may not be totally correct, but is close. One confusing example is the various “pay less” names and stores and the various divestitures and acquisitions in the 1980s and 1990s. What is clear is that it is difficult to shop at a grocery or drug store in much of the country that doesn't have a Skaggs heritage in its history. An account of the Skaggs family back to the Revolutionary War, as well as the move of some of it west, can be found in “The Skaggs Saga” Another, but not independent, account by R. Skaggs Some of the grocery store images were obtained from David Gwynn) Of these there were six sons who came to be known by their initials:

Pepper Oscar Skaggs, born January 7, 1881, became O.P.
Aron Sylvester Skaggs, born January 14, 1886, became S.A.
Marion Barton Skaggs, born April 5, 1888, became M.B.
Loronzo L. Skaggs, born May 5, 1891, became L.L.
Samuel Olnie Skaggs, born November 14, 1895, became L.S.
Levi Justin Skaggs, born May 4, 1899, became L.J.

Between 1908 and 1910, Samuel Skaggs brought his family from Missouri to Idaho. As a minister of a small group in a small frontier town, American Falls, Idaho, he needed additional support for his large family. He opened a small grocery store, but to compete with the few that were already operating, he changed its business model from one of credit accounts, which were tailored to the sporadic and seasonal income of farmers, to a cash-only basis. Attracting customers to this simpler arrangement would make sense if he could sell for much less than his competitors. While the margin would be lower, he avoided the risk of non-payment of accounts. To drive down the wholesale price of the groceries he sold, he bought them in larger lots than competitors. In those days large lots were defined by some fraction of a railroad carload, and because American Falls was a stop on the Union Pacific Railroad, this afforded Sam Skaggs an opportunity to buy and sell for less. Perhaps more important to his expansion-oriented sons than to Sam, the savings of large-lot buying increased as more stores came on line.

To portray the evolution and impact of the merchandising practiced by Skaggs and to track the creation of stores and their ownership transfers, a nearly 100-year chronology is used. In it lies the genesis of much of the modern merchandising. The Skaggs family anticipated what customers wanted, so the Skaggs brothers and their merchandising model comprise a thread in the fabric of the present commercial world. This chronology begins with Sam Skaggs moving his growing family west:

== Timeline of events in the history of the Skaggs family ==
- 1907 S.M. Skaggs leaves Missouri and moves west with his family in search of a better climate. They settle in American Falls, Idaho before 1910 where he is located in that year's census.
- 1914 In a separate commercial effort Sam Seelig founds a chain of four stores in California called Sam Seelig Grocers. According to the Safeway web site, this chain grew to over 322 stores by 1926. In 1925 he renamed them Safeway.
- 1915 In April, S. M. opens the Skaggs Cash Store "with his own hands, on rented property, on borrowed money." The store was about 18x32 feet. It was located in the original town of American Falls, adjacent to the Union Pacific railroad tracks, and he apparently bought large lots from the rail cars and sold them to the public. That store became Skaggs Store No. 1 and is now beneath the American Falls Reservoir. When the town was relocated between 1923 and 1925, that store was situated at the corner of Ft. Hall and Idaho Street, now housing the Senior Center. Unusual for the time, the Rev. Skaggs had a cash only, no credit policy, which all his sons later adopted. (Note: From the Historical Edition of the Power County Press of 10 July 1975 comes this insight into M.B.’s early merchandizing rationale. “In the beginning my plans were not based on the idea of multiple units. I didn't see that far into my own principle of economic buying and quantity distribution. But before long I realized that we could go only so far in applying those principles to a single store. The only way a merchant in the food business can expand his business is by opening additional stores.” He added, “I wanted to have food stores in other towns; and I wanted each one to be known as a place where customers could spend their money safely and profitably.” When local wholesalers wouldn't give him a volume discount, he found someone in Portland and, in turn, began opening stores in that area too. (See Skaggs advertisements below).) (Note: From “Memories of Early Aberdeen” by E.L. Davis, Chapter 3, (Found online at www.geocities.com/dyancey3/edlchip3.htm, on 15 Nov 2003) comes this observation about the new Skaggs’ merchandising philosophy: "One day, a man, whose name I cannot remember, asked if I had heard of a new concern in American Falls which was selling things so much cheaper than others in that town or Aberdeen.'Just think,' he said; 'cabbage is selling for one and one-half to two cents per pound. Fruit, very cheap because it was being shipped in carload lots, and sold from the car direct.' The merchants of American Falls didn't like such actions by strangers, and we were told that they asked for help from the city council. But these fellows didn't care nor quit easily, but kept right on selling cheaply and selling much. I went to American Falls about that time and found that things were about as reported. To make a long story short, 'Skaggs' had come to town, and in a short time Skaggs stores No. 1 and No. 2 were located in American Falls, soon to be followed by such stores in nearby cities - later all over the State. Now Skaggs stores are all over the West, but … Skaggs, Safeways and O.P. Skaggs originated right in our own back yard, or front yard, as you wish it, at American Falls, Idaho, and, as everyone knows, are doing hundreds of millions of dollars per year business, from a start of one small building advertised on the front as Skaggs Store No. 1.") (See adjacent newspaper ads.)
- 1916 S.M. sells this store to his third son, M.B. (then 29 and a well driller), for $1,088, and moves to eastern Oregon. (Note: While his reason for moving to Oregon is not known, his wife, Nancy Long Skaggs, died shortly thereafter, on 6 November 1917. She and the Reverend are both buried in the American Falls ID cemetery, Sec. D. While still in Oregon, Samuel married Rosa B. Snooks on 22 August 1919 in Baker OR.) Though M.B. didn't at first contemplate having multiple stores, he saw his principle of economical buying and quantity distribution going only so far with a single store. The following year M.B., with the help of some of his brothers, starts expanding; opening stores in Blackfoot, Rupert and Burley, Idaho. This process continues elsewhere to form a grocery store chain that reached 428 stores by 1926. (Note: Safeway web site plus This site draws from the City of Oakland’s Historic Resources Inventory dated April 30, 1983.The groceteria web site puts the number at 673.) In the meantime O.P. also starts Skaggs Cash Stores in Idaho Falls, Elko NV, and elsewhere, including California. He numbers his stores with even numbers and they have orange fronts while M.B. uses odd numbers and uses blue fronts. L.J. goes to work for O.P. in Ogden.

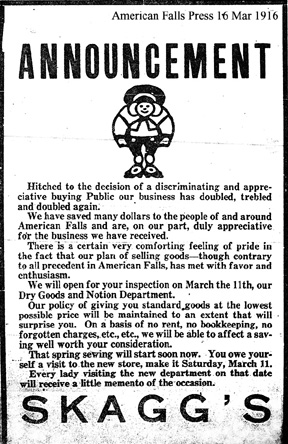
1916 ad from the first Skaggs store in American Falls, Idaho

- 1917 Five small grocery chains in the Philadelphia area combine to form American Stores Company. This group would be acquired by a Skaggs enterprise in 1978.
- 1918 L.S. returns from military duty and reenters the grocery business with his brothers.

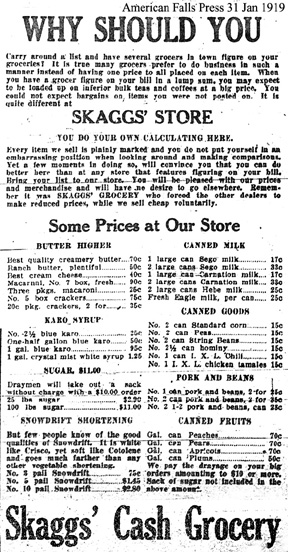
1919 ad from the first Skaggs store in American Falls, Idaho

- 1919 The brothers form a partnership called Skaggs United Stores. In Ogden, Utah L.J. meets and marries Mary Dee, daughter of a Mormon convert from the Netherlands. They work together to open a chain of Pay’n Takit Stores. These would eventually (1928) become part of Safeway.
- 1926 About this time O.P. sells some of his grocery chain to his brothers bringing the total Skaggs United Stores to 428 stores in ten states. This included some of O.P.’s Skaggs Cash Stores in California. (Probably does not include O.P.’s drug stores or all of his California food stores. See below.) This year Charles Merrill, a co-founder of the Merrill Lynch investment firm in 1914, engineered the merger of Skaggs United Stores and Safeway. M.B. became President of the new company and the stores were initially called Skaggs Safeway. They reverted to just Safeway after about 18 months. Merrill temporarily withdrew from the financial industry in 1930 to help oversee the expansion of the Safeway enterprise. M.B. remained the head until 1934. Also, by this time, one C.J. Call purchased a chain of California food stores from O.P.
- 1928 Mainly through acquiring grocery chains in California, Washington, DC, and Kansas City, Safeway expands to 2020 stores, 855 of which are combination stores with meat markets. Sales in 1929 were $203 million. Part of the expansion involved Safeway acquiring the Pay’n Takit stores of L.J. that ranged from the mountain states into California, Arizona, and Texas. For many years they were called Safeway Pay’n Takit.
- 1930 L.S. is intermountain director for Safeway, residing in Salt Lake City.
- 1931 Safeway stores in the U.S. and Canada now number 3527. This would be the largest number of Safeway stores.
- 1932 L.J. Skaggs opens his first self-service drug store, PayLess Drug, in Tacoma, Washington. The PayLess chain grew throughout the West, but L.J. would sell most of his interests to his brothers and associates. By 1965 three companies would result: one in Washington and Oregon, a 4-store chain in Tacoma, Washington, and one company he would retain in California. L.J.’s California stores, headquartered in Oakland, California, would be sold to the Washington-Oregon chain in 1980 and then to Rite Aid sometime around 2000.
- 1933 The Skaggs brothers' cash‑only policy helps them weather the depression.
- 1934 M.B. retires as head of Safeway. Allen Rosenberg opens Arizona’s first self-service drug store called Thrifty Payless Drugs selling it eight years later (1942) to the L.L. Skaggs chain.
- 1936 Death of Samuel M. Skaggs 30 October.
- 1937 L.L. Skaggs and Harold Finch found Pay-Less Drug in Rochester, Minnesota. It was the Midwest's first self-service drug store. With the opening of a second store in Mason City, Iowa the following year, the name was changed to Self-Service Drug, Inc. It would later (1942) become Osco Drug, which would grow to approximately 600 stores in 19 states by 2003.
- 1938 Joe Albertson, a district manager for Safeway, enters into partnership with L.S. Skaggs and the latter's accountant, Tom Cuthbert, and opens first store in Boise, Idaho. M.B.’s son-in-law, with his brother, form Longs Drugs that today has 450 stores in six western states. Coincidentally, the brothers, Joe and Tom, had the same last name as that of M.B.’s mother, Nancy E. Long.
- 1939 L.S. resigns from Safeway to enter the drugstore business. Two associates from Safeway join him and they buy four Pay Less stores from his brother L.J. They were located in Salt Lake, Ogden, Boise, and Great Falls. O.P. sells some stores in Nebraska to George W. Martin, whose family operated them until selling them in 1964. In 1959 Martin started a new set of stores in Nebraska called Skagway and several are operating today in Omaha and Grand Island.
- 1942 L.L. Skaggs forms a partnership with H.B. Finch, Paul Stratton and George Hilden and call it the Owners Service Company, hence Osco. The headquarters was then moved from Waterloo, Iowa to the Merchandise Mart in Chicago, Illinois. By 1961 they had 31 stores in six states.
- 1945 C.J. Call (see 1926), with Ira Brown, open the first Sav-on Drug Store in San Bernardino, California. Sav-on Drugs would be acquired by Jewel Companies. who would, in turn be bought by American Stores, headed by L.S.’s son.
- 1948 Some PayLess Drug Stores change their name to Skaggs Drug Stores.
- 1949 Death of L.S. at age 54. His son, L.S. Skaggs Jr. (“Sam”), takes over his father's role at age 26. At that point there were 11 drug stores with $9.5M sales. L.S. Jr.’s expansion drive was remarkable for by 1978 he had grown that number to 202 stores and 39 super-centers in 21 states with over $1B sales.
- 1950 The M.B. and Estella Skaggs Foundation builds a community hospital just north of Branson, Missouri.
- 1951 Albertson’s opens first combination food and drug store, a 60,000 sq ft (5,600 m^{2}) superstore.
- 1955 Safeway control passes to Robert Magowan, Charles Merrill’s son-in-law, who continued Safeway expansion to become the second largest grocery chain in the U.S. But by the 1970s it was in financial difficulty and losing market share.
- 1956 General Electric sues a group of Western retailers for selling its products at below recommended price. Skaggs Companies counter-sues and wins, overturning so-called “fair trade” laws in Utah and other states that prohibited discounting.
- 1961 Jewel Companies acquires the L.L. Skaggs-founded Osco Drug chain.
- 1962 Using the name of the island on which it had been located early in World War II, a Navy radio receiving station in north San Francisco Bay officially adds Skaggs Island to its name. The island had been named for M.B. when he financially helped the struggling Sonoma Land Co. during the depression of the 1930s. The Navy station was decommissioned in 1993.
- 1965 Skaggs Drug Stores incorporates as Skaggs Drug Centers and over the next few years acquires drug chains called Josco, Harts, Cook's in the South and West, and Katz, which had stores in the Midwest and also owned the non-California operations of L.J. Skaggs's old PayLess chain.
- 1969 Albertson's and Skaggs partner to create Skaggs-Albertsons combination stores and over the next few years opened 58 such stores in Oklahoma and the Southeast.
- 1970 Death of L.J. They had set up a large foundation which his wife Mary continued to lead. Total grants have exceeded $32M. Queen Elizabeth II named Mary an honorary commander of the Order of the British Empire in 1999 for her philanthropic work in England.
- 1977 Because managing their 1969 venture became difficult and for other financial and legal reasons, Albertson's and Skaggs separate amicably...both taking equal shares.
- 1978 L.S. Jr., 55, initiates the Skaggs Companies Inc. (formerly Skaggs Drug Centers) acquisition of American Stores, completing it by the spring of 1979. He keeps the latter name and relocates headquarters to Salt Lake City. American had 785 food stores and 139 drug stores to 241 Skaggs stores. Alpha Beta and Acme food stores were part of American Stores.
- 1980 Peter Magowan takes over Safeway and through several efficiency moves, makes Safeway the most profitable grocery chain in the country if not the largest. L.J. sells his PayLess Drug Stores of Oakland, California to the Washington-Oregon PayLess stores formed in 1932. Jewel Co. buys Sav-On Drugs of Southern California.
- 1984 In a hostile takeover, American Stores acquired Jewel Companies (for $1.1B). One aim was to become the first coast-to-coast drug store chain. Curiously, this purchase added Sav-On Drugs, which Jewel had bought in 1980 and which had its beginning with the partnership of O.P. Skaggs, and also returned the Osco drug chain, which L.L Skaggs had started, to the Skaggs fold. The Skaggs Drug Centers were also converted to Osco Drug Stores. According to an Associated Press wire story by Jennifer Brandlon on 11 Dec. 1984, L.S. Jr. is "a private person, a wizard at acquisition, has great enthusiasm for his work, has a management style that pays great attention to detail, and is bare bones…parsimoniously allowing no company cars or credit cards." American has 102,000 employees and after the first nine months of the year, over $8B revenue. American Stores later grew to 1700 stores in 40 states with $15 billion in sales.
- 1986 To avoid a hostile takeover by Herbert Haft and family, Safeway agreed to acquisition by Kohlberg, Kravis, Roberts & Co. for $5.3B, taking the company private in the second largest leverage buyout in history. To pay off incurred debt, nearly half of its 2200 stores were sold, including those in England and Australia. Peter Magowan remained CEO until forced out in 1992, but continued as a director until 2005. Magowan, with supporting partners, later purchases the San Francisco Giants.
- 1988 After considerable positioning that moved the purchase price from $45 to $65 per share and opposition from California's attorney general, American Stores acquires Lucky Stores of Dublin CA. [20] Lucky had started as Peninsula Stores (on the San Francisco Peninsula) in 1931 and had become one of California's largest chains with operations in Northern and Southern California. But L.S. Jr. reached the mandatory retirement age of 65 and stepped down as CEO of American Stores; ...moving to Chairman. A period of consolidation and debt reduction begins with sell-offs occurring into the 1990s. Its total holding of stores drops from 1,848 in 1990 to 1,695 in 1996 but profits increased over that period nearly $100M.
- 1990 Safeway again goes public and in late 1990 and resumes buying regional chains such as Randalls in Texas, Carrs in Alaska, Dominick's in Illinois, and Vons in Southern California.
- 1992 Albertsons purchases 74 Jewel-Osco combination stores from American Stores.
- 1995 L.S. Skaggs Jr. relinquishes the Chairmanship of American Stores, and within two years the company purchased $550 million of his shares, leaving him with insufficient ownership to keep his seat on the board. Thus ended the Skaggs family's leadership in the commercial world.
- 1998 Albertsons acquires Seessels, Smittys, Buttrey, and some Bruno Stores.
- 1999 Albertsons acquires American Stores for $12.7B to become the nation's biggest supermarket chain. Prior to this, Albertsons was the nation's fourth largest supermarket chain with 994 supermarkets in 25 states, while American Stores Company was the nation's second largest supermarket chain with 802 supermarkets and 773 stand-alone drug stores in 31 states. Lucky Stores change name to Albertsons. This merger was so large that the Federal Trade Commission (June 22, 1999) required its largest divestiture ever in forcing the sale of 144 of the combine's supermarkets and sites and also imposed future growth restrictions in specified geographic regions.
- 2003 Safeway has approximately 1700 stores across the US and Canada which include 329 Vons stores in Southern California and Nevada, 132 Randall and Tom Thumb stores in Texas, 42 Genuardi's in the Philadelphia area, and 21 Carr's stores in Alaska. Albertsons operates over 2500 stores in 38 states.
- 2005 Albertsons, Inc. announced in September that it is considering putting the company up for sale; that the board is exploring strategic alternatives to increase shareholder value. Among the reasons given was increased pressure from Wal-Mart type supercenters.
- 2006 On January 23, Albertsons made known that it had agreed to be sold for about $17.4B and broken into three parts. A Minnesota-based grocery chain Supervalu would buy 1,124 Albertsons stores and in-store pharmacies and with 2,656 stores will become the nation's second largest grocery chain after Kroger. CVS, the nation's largest drug store chain, will purchase about 700 stand-alone Sav-on and Osco drug stores for about $4B. The remaining set of about 655 Albertsons grocery stores will be purchased by a financial group led by New York-based Cerberus. The Albertsons name will continue. The sale was said to be due to increased competition from "large-box stores" such as Wal-Mart and specialty stores such as Whole Foods Market.
- 2009 - Death of Mary Skaggs in Santa Rosa, California on October 2, age 109 years and 8 months.
- 2013 - Albertsons is split from SuperValu along with the former ASC properties (Jewel-Osco, Acme, and Shaws/Star) and sold to Albertsons LLC/Cerebus.
- 2013 March 21 Death of L.S. “Sam” Skaggs.

== Skaggs Foundations ==
The Skaggs sons established a number of charitable organizations. The ALSAM Foundation has funded education and health research in the form of scholarships as well as the establishment or funding of a number of university and research centers. The Skaggs Catholic Center in Draper, Utah, includes Juan Diego Catholic High School, a middle school, an elementary school, and a daycare on a shared 53-acre (210,000 m^{2}) campus. Other notable gifts from the ALSAM Foundation include $100 million for the creation of The Skaggs Center for Chemical Biology at The Scripps Research Institute—one of the largest gifts ever made to medical research.

Skaggs Community Health Center in Branson, Missouri (now Cox Health Branson) was named after M.B. and Estella Skaggs. M.B. was a Missouri native who owned a home and game preserve in eastern Taney County.

== See also ==
- Skaggs Island
