= Skaggs Companies =

US retail company

The Skaggs Companies, Inc.
- Industry: Retail
- Founded: 1915; 111 years ago
- Defunct: 1979
- Successor: American Stores
- Area served: United States
- Products: Food, Prescriptions, Liquor
- Subsidiaries: Skaggs Drug Centers; Payless Drugs; Osco Drug

The Skaggs Companies, Inc. was the predecessor to many famous United States retailing chains, including Safeway, Albertsons, Osco Drug, and Longs Drugs. The company owned several drugstore chains, but all of them were sold. Skaggs Cos. became American Stores in 1979.

== History ==
=== Safeway ===
The first company was based in American Falls, Idaho, where in 1915 Samuel M. Skaggs founded a grocery store and operated it as Skaggs' Cash Store, which was sold to his son Marion Barton Skaggs. It took the name "Cash Store" as it operated on only a cash basis. With the assistance of his five brothers: Pepper Oscar Skaggs, Aron Sylvester Skaggs, Loronzo L. Skaggs, Samuel Olnie Skaggs, Levi Justin Skaggs, Marion Skaggs grew the chain, operated as two separate businesses, Skaggs Cash Stores (Pepper Oscar Skaggs) and Skaggs United Stores (M. B. Skaggs), to 191 stores by 1920.

In 1921, Marion Barton Skaggs moved to Portland, Oregon, purchased a home in the Alameda neighborhood and established four groceries in town, in part by buying the Freeman grocer and the Java Coffee Company.

By 1926 it had grown to 673 stores, when it merged with Sam Seelig Company (in a deal orchestrated by Charles Merrill of Merrill Lynch to form Safeway). Safeway later acquired Pay and Take It Stores from Loronzo L. Skaggs in 1928. Safeway is considered the main successor to Skaggs, and despite the Skaggs Companies later being bought by Albertsons, Safeway was also acquired by Albertsons, thus bringing the Skaggs history full-circle.

=== Payless Drugs ===
In 1932 L.J. Skaggs opened Payless Drug Stores in Tacoma, Washington, which soon expanded across the western United States. Some stores were sold to his brother Samuel "L.S." Olnie Skaggs (then an executive at Safeway) along with some colleagues. L.J. Skaggs retained California Pay Less Stores, which became part of Thrifty PayLess, and which are now owned by Rite Aid. The remaining Pay-Less stores were renamed Skaggs Drug Stores in 1948, Skaggs Drug Centers in 1965. In 1969 Albertsons supermarkets and Skaggs Drugs partnered to create combination food and drug stores, a partnership that dissolved in 1977, with assets divided.

Payless of Tacoma would exist in Pierce, Thurston and Kitsap counties as a separate company from Payless/House of Values which was formed in 1973 after Seattle based Gov Mart/Ba'zar and House of Values were merged. To separate the two companies (and confusion), the stores remained under the House of Values name before being rebranded as Value Giant. Once Payless of Tacoma declared bankruptcy in 1991, the company was merged with the existing Payless stores from the other company and the Value Giant name was removed for the existing stores.

Early photos of a Payless Drug Store under the ownership of L.J. Skaggs are currently on display at the Albany Regional Museum in Albany, Oregon. The downtown location at 2nd and Broadalbin Streets was later relocated to Santiam Highway during the 1960s.

=== Osco Drug ===
Osco Drug traces its history back to 1915 by S.M. Skaggs in American Falls, Idaho as a cash and carry store. His son Lorenzo L. Skaggs, who had been involved in the predecessor to Safeway, founded the Pay-Less chain in 1937 in Rochester, Minnesota. In 1942, these chains merged with others and formed the Owners Service Company, shortened to Osco. In 1961, The Jewel Companies, Inc. acquired Osco Drug Stores. In 1984, American Stores bought Jewel, which had owned Osco Drug since 1961. American Stores was purchased in 1999 by Albertsons. In 2006, Albertsons was broken up and many standalone Osco stores were purchased by CVS Pharmacy. The Osco name remains in place as the drug store component of Jewel-Osco and Shaw's-Osco stores.

=== Skaggs Drug Centers and American Stores ===
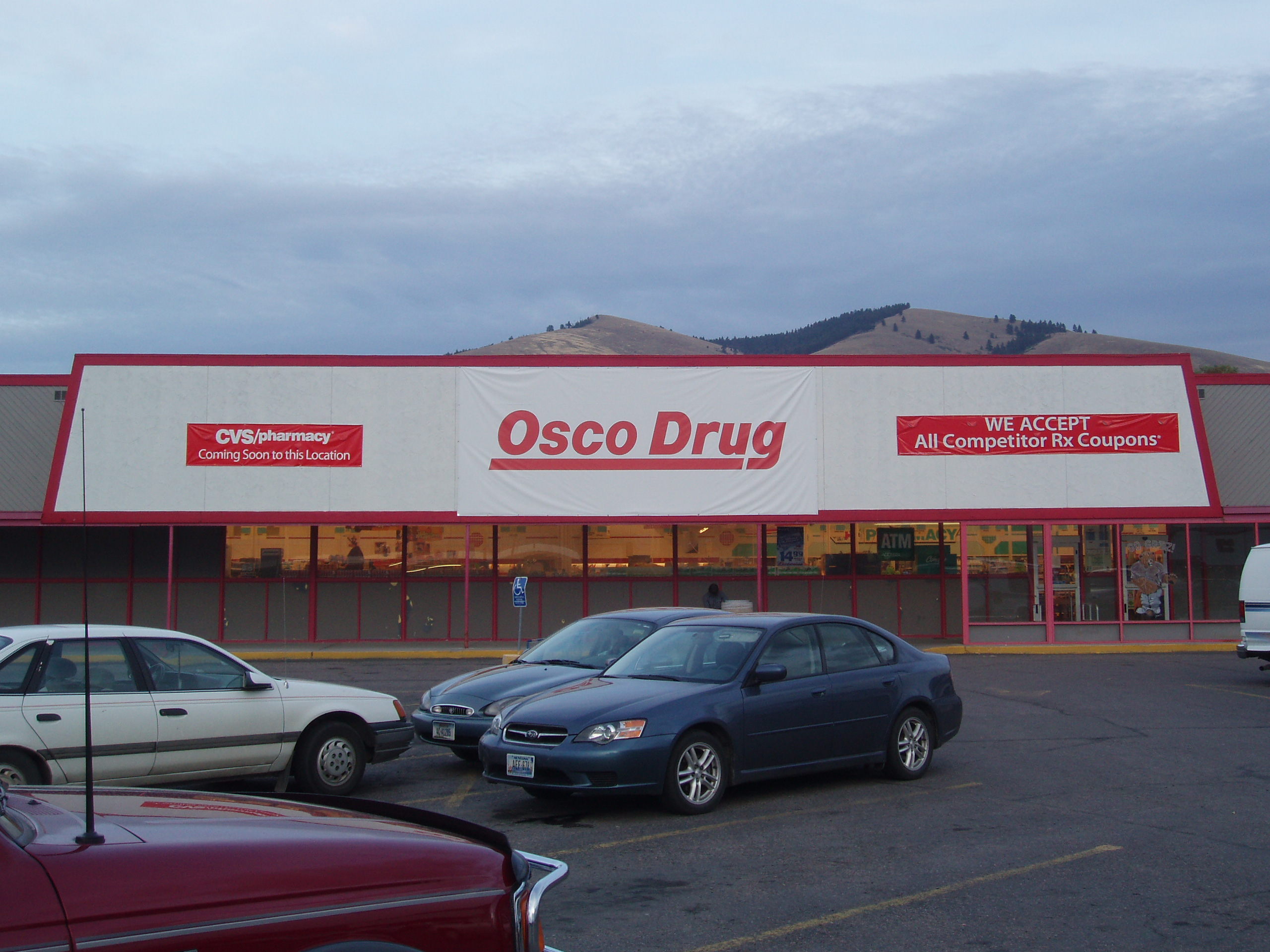
A former Skaggs Drug Centers store in Missoula, Montana (2006)

American Stores, which owned Acme Markets and Alpha Beta, was acquired in 1979 by Skaggs Drug Centers, which adopted the American Stores Company name, and relocated the company headquarters to Salt Lake City, Utah.

American Stores was by far the larger organization, with 758 supermarkets, 139 drugstores, 53 restaurants, and 9 general merchandise stores in nine states when compared to the 241 Skaggs stores. Although the resulting entity bore the American Stores Company name, it was controlled by Skaggs management headed by Leonard S. Skaggs Jr. more familiarly known as Sam Skaggs. Stores in several markets having both an Alpha Beta supermarket and a Skaggs Drug Center drugstore presence were combined (or expanded) to combination food and drug stores and re-branded Skaggs-Alpha Beta.

- In 1977, Skaggs Companies, Inc. had amicably dissolved a partnership started in 1969 with the Albertsons supermarket chain which pioneered the first combination food-drug with stores named Skaggs-Albertsons.

To consolidate the names of some of its subsidiaries under one title with nationwide recognition, American Stores renamed some of its Skaggs Alpha Beta stores to Jewel-Osco in mid-September 1991. American replaced the Skaggs-Alpha Beta name with that of Jewel-Osco on all 76 stores in Texas, Oklahoma, New Mexico, and Arkansas. One year later, Albertsons would buy 74 Jewel-Osco stores (some only months before named Skaggs-Alpha Beta) in Oklahoma, Florida, Arkansas, and Texas from American Stores. American Stores and its subsidiaries would be acquired by Albertsons in 1999.

== Skaggs Foundation ==
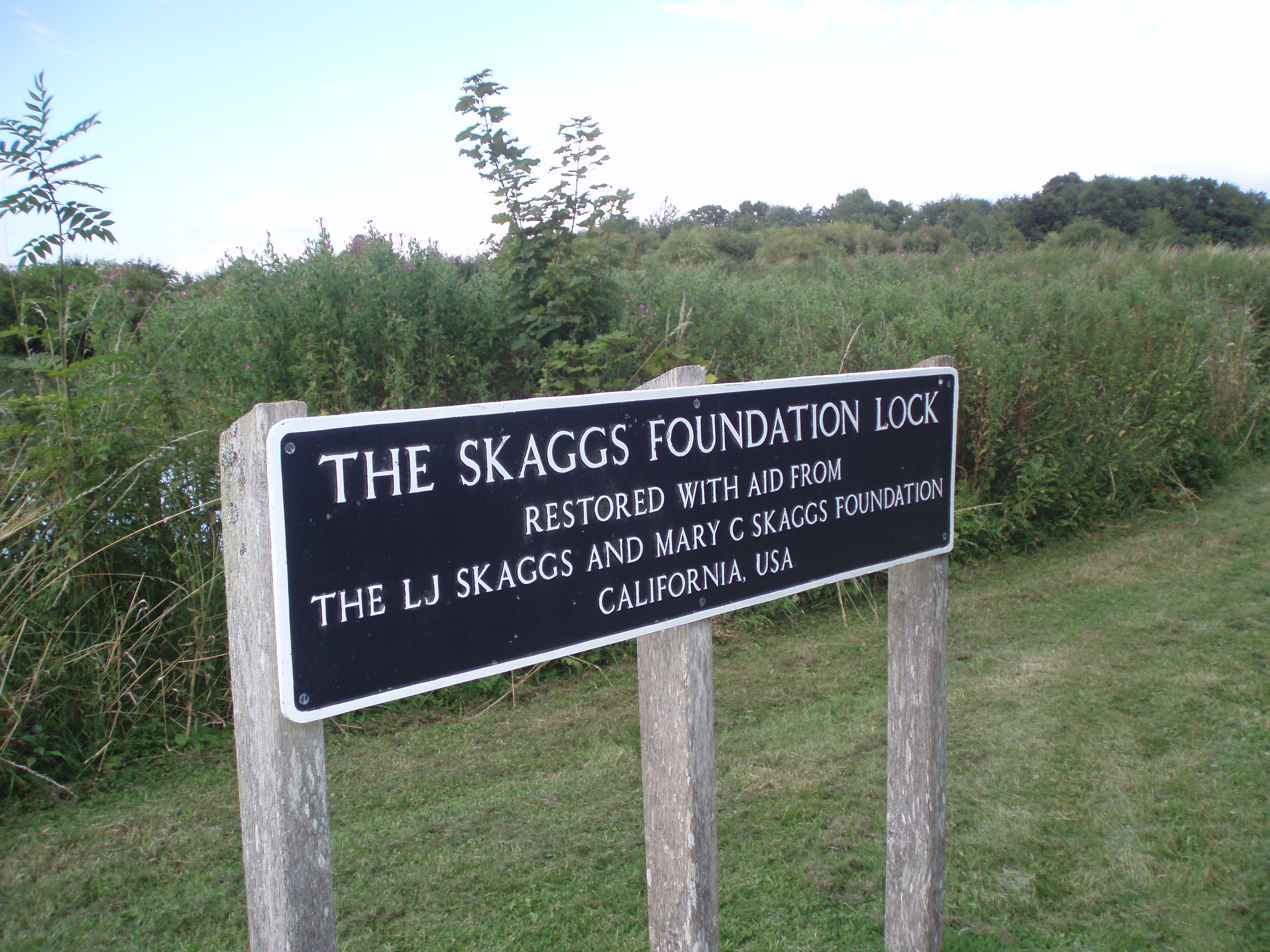
Paid for lock to be named in their honor on the Caen flight, Devizes

L.J. Skaggs along with his wife Mary Skaggs founded the Skaggs Foundation.

== See also ==
- Skaggs family
