= Warehouse store =

Type of discount retailer

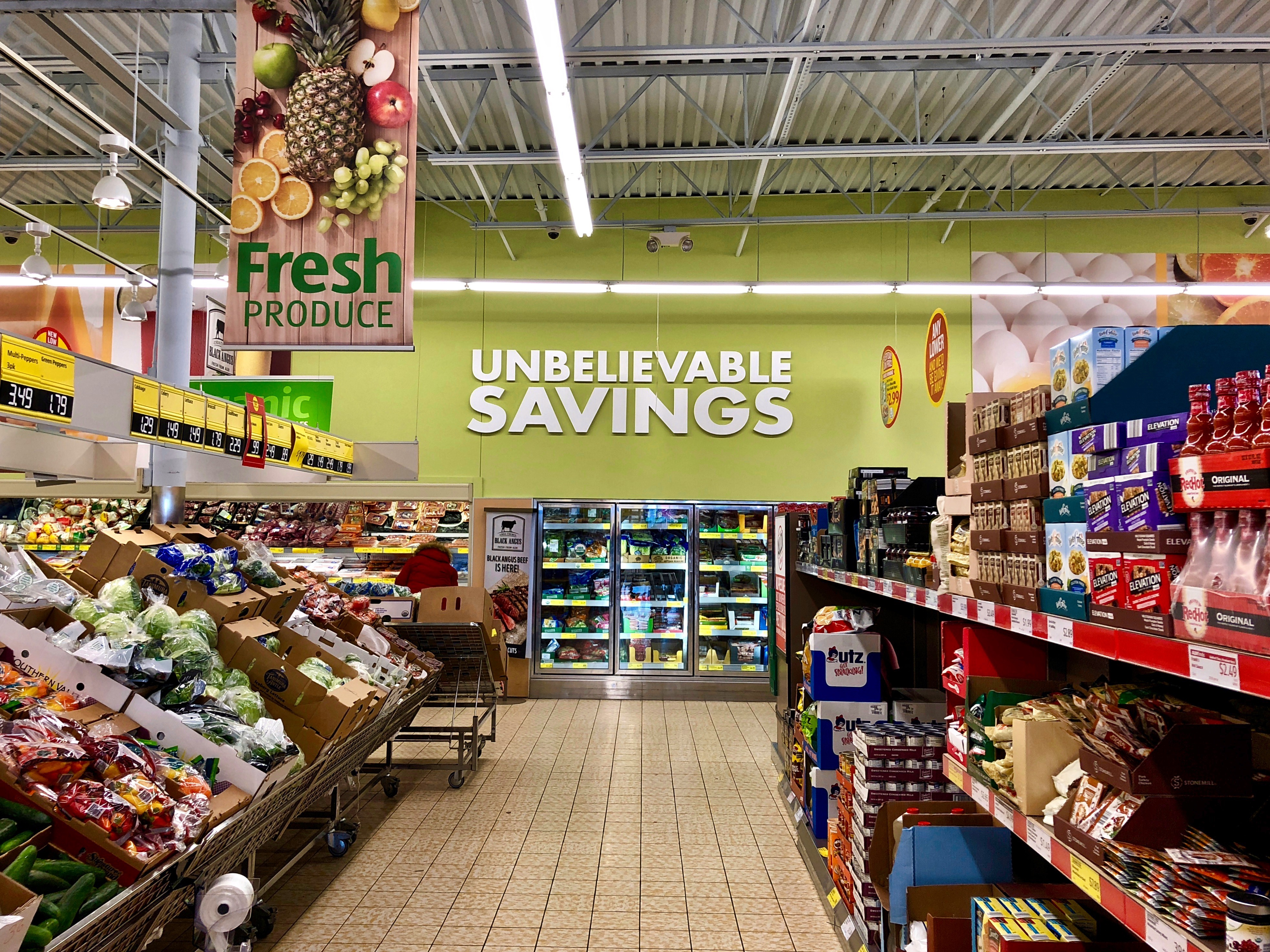
Interior of a warehouse store

A warehouse store or warehouse supermarket is a food and grocery retailer that operates stores geared toward offering deeper discounted prices than a traditional supermarket. These stores offer a no-frills experience and warehouse shelving stocked well with merchandise intended to move at higher volumes. Unlike warehouse clubs, warehouse stores do not require a membership or membership fees. Warehouse stores can also offer a selection of merchandise sold in bulk. Typically, warehouse stores are laid out in a logical format; this leads customers in a certain way around the store to the checkout. For example, as one enters the store they are directed down an aisle of discounted products. From there the layout could then lead to the fresh produce department, followed by the deli and bakery departments at the back of the store. Often, certain customer service niceties, like the bagging of groceries, are not done by store employees; this helps reduce overall cost. Many warehouse stores are operated by traditional grocery chains both as a way to attract lower income, value conscious consumers and to maximize their buying power in order to lower costs at their mainstream stores.

== Examples ==
=== United States and Canada ===
Traditional warehouse store chains include:

1. Cub Foods, affiliated with SuperValu
2. Food 4 Less, affiliated with Kroger (and Nugget Markets in Northern California/Oregon)
3. Food Basics (Canada), affiliated with Metro Inc.
4. Food Basics (United States), affiliated with A&P
5. Food Maxx, affiliated with Save Mart
6. Foods Co., affiliated with Kroger
7. Food Source, affiliated with Raley's Supermarkets
8. Superior Grocers, an independently owned southern California chain
9. Super 1 Foods, based in east Texas, Arkansas and Louisiana; owned by Brookshire Grocery Company
10. Super 1 Foods, based in Idaho, Montana, and Washington, owned by Rosauers Supermarkets
11. Super One Foods, a small chain based in Duluth, Minnesota
12. Super Saver Foods, affiliated with Albertsons
13. Warehouse Economy Outlet (WEO), affiliated with A&P, now defunct
14. Smart & Final (SFS), Owned by Ares Management, recently began trading publicly
15. Warehouse Markets a small Tulsa OK based chain
16. WinCo Foods (includes one Waremart store in Oregon)

Other types of warehouse store chains include:

1. Aldi. Aldi Stores are smaller specialty stores that largely feature only their own in house private labels.
2. Woodman's Markets. Focuses on carrying a much large variety of brands and product offerings than traditional supermarkets at lower prices.

== See also ==
- Types of retail outlets
- Kerbside pickup - warehouse store, without the store
