= Buttrey Food & Drug =

American grocery chain

Buttrey Food & Drug Stores Co.
- Type: Subsidiary
- Industry: Retail
- Predecessor: F.A. Buttrey Co.
- Founded: 1896 (Havre, Montana)
- Founder: Frank A. Buttrey
- Defunct: October 1998
- Fate: Acquired by and rebranded as Albertsons
- Successor: Albertsons
- Headquarters: Great Falls, Montana
- Number of locations: 44 (1998)
- Area served: Idaho, Minnesota, Montana, North Dakota, Oregon, Washington, Wyoming
- Products: Supermarkets/food-drug stores
- Revenue: $391.4 million (1998)
- Parent: The Jewel Companies, Inc. (1966–1984); American Stores (1984–1990)
- Subsidiaries: Buttrey Big Fresh; Buttrey Fresh Foods

Buttrey Food & Drug was a chain of grocery stores founded in Havre, Montana, and formerly headquartered in Great Falls, Montana. The company was founded in 1896 as a chain of department stores branded Buttrey Department Store. The company opened grocery stores in 1935 and sold off its department store division following a 1966 acquisition by The Jewel Companies, Inc. Jewel was sold to American Stores in 1984, and later Buttrey was sold off as a separate company in 1990. The company was sold to its main competitor, Boise, Idaho–based Albertsons, in October 1998 and the Buttrey name was retired. At that time, Buttrey was operating 44 stores in Montana, Wyoming, and North Dakota with a revenue of US$391.4 million.

== History ==
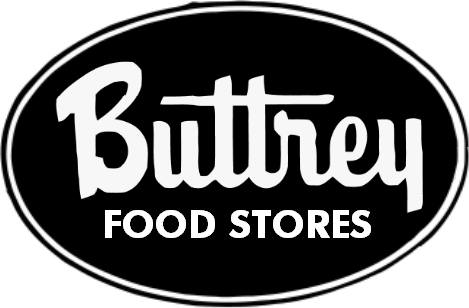
Buttrey Food Stores logo until 1980

=== Founding ===
The history of Buttrey can be traced back to 1896 when Frank A. Buttrey opened small store, selling clothing and groceries, in Aldridge, Montana, a short-lived mining town in Park County. Another store was opened at Trailcreek, in Flathead County, Montana, in 1899. In 1902, Buttrey moved to Havre, Montana, and opened a dry good and general merchandise store. Buttrey's business was incorporated as F.A. Buttrey Co. in 1909.

In 1921, Buttrey began to open more stores along Montana's Hi-Line. In 1922, Buttrey established Montana's first radio station, KFBB in Havre, with the radio station moving to Great Falls seven years later. In 1935, the company spun-off its grocery division to a separate company, Buttrey Foods, Inc. In 1939, Buttrey built a frozen foods storage plant in Great Falls, that same year offering frozen food lockers for rent in Havre. In 1944, F.A. Buttrey Co. acquired Berger Department Store in Great Falls, Montana. Five years later, Frank Buttrey died at age 80 in Havre.

In 1954, Buttrey Foods moved its home office and its grocery distribution headquarters from Havre to Great Falls. At this time, Buttrey Foods owned 15 grocery stores across Montana. In 1958, Buttrey Foods opened the largest supermarket in Montana, in Great Falls. F.A. Buttrey Co. would soon follow the grocery chain to Great Falls in 1960.

=== Acquisition by Jewel and American Stores ===
Buttrey-Osco logo used on stores during the 1980s

In 1966, Buttrey Foods was acquired by Chicago-based grocer Jewel Companies. The F.A. Buttrey Co. stores, which operated under the Buttreys Suburban banner and were not part of the Jewel deal, closed in 1976. In the years following the acquisition by Jewel, Buttrey Foods began opening Buttrey-Osco combination stores, which combined the products sold by Buttrey and Osco Drug. Soon after, Jewel Companies financed a far-flung expansion plan which added Buttrey stores to several new markets in the Northwest and Upper Midwest states. In 1981, Buttrey operated 53 stores in Montana, North Dakota, Minnesota, Wyoming, Washington, Oregon, and Idaho.

In June 1984, American Stores acquired Jewel Companies. The following year, Buttrey Foods took full ownership of all 31 Buttrey-Osco stores and rebranded them as Buttrey Food & Drug stores. In 1986, American Stores relocated Buttrey's headquarters to Salt Lake City, Utah, home of American Stores' Skaggs-Alpha Beta division. Buttrey then used the Skaggs-Alpha Beta name for its store brand.

In July 1987, Buttrey closed seven stores in Idaho, which included all locations in Boise and Pocatello. Three of the five Boise stores were sold to Albertsons.

In September 1987, Skaggs Alpha-Beta was reorganized into Alpha-Beta Stores, Inc., which relocated Buttrey's headquarters back to Great Falls in a newly formed division of Alpha-Beta.

American Stores put Buttrey up for sale in May 1990 and, in August, sold the chain to an investment group (Buttrey Acquisition Corp) led by Buttrey's management and Los Angeles–based investment firm Freeman Spogli & Co. American Stores received $184 million from proceeds of the sale and other agreements. At the time of the sale, Buttrey had operated 44 stores and employed 4,200 workers in Idaho, Montana, North Dakota, Washington, and Wyoming.

=== Launch of Buttrey Big Fresh and sale to Albertsons ===
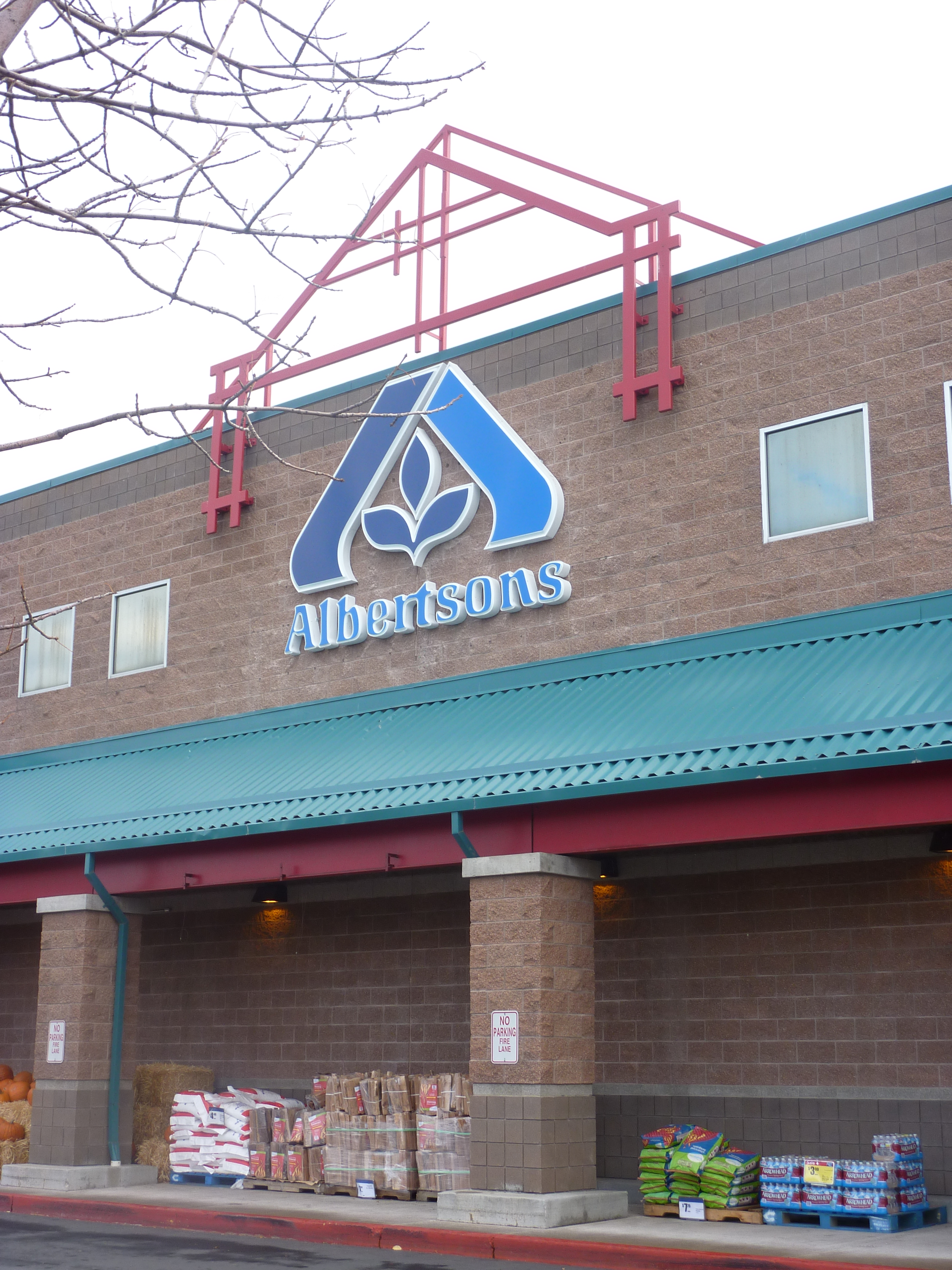
A former Buttrey location in Missoula, Montana, that was acquired by Albertsons during the 1998 merger

In November 1990, the closures of its last two stores in Idaho, located in Idaho Falls and Twin Falls, were announced. In 1991, Buttrey replaced its Skaggs-Alpha Beta store brands with Shurfine brands. In 1992, Buttrey Food & Drug went public in an effort to reduce debt. In 1994, Buttrey sold its six remaining stores in Washington to focus on its core markets of Montana, Wyoming, and North Dakota.

In response to increasing competition from big-box retailers such as Costco Wholesale and Walmart entering Buttrey's core markets, in November 1995, the chain launched the Buttrey Big Fresh concept to increase traffic in Buttrey stores. The first Big Fresh, a remodeled Buttrey in Great Falls, featured several expanded food departments and a Buttrey Food Court, which featured a coffee and espresso bar, and a selection of small restaurants. In the years following, Buttrey converted several other stores to the Big Fresh format.

In January 1998, rival chain Albertsons announced its intentions to acquire Buttrey Food & Drug for $134 million. Albertsons' acquisition of Buttrey was completed in October 1998 and 35 Buttrey stores were converted to Albertsons stores days after the acquisition was complete, ending the Buttrey moniker. 15 Buttrey and Albertsons stores were sold to Smith's and SuperValu to address anti-trust concerns. At the time of the sale, Buttrey was operating 44 stores in Montana, North Dakota, and Wyoming under the Buttrey Food & Drug, Buttrey Big Fresh, and Buttrey Fresh Foods banners. In June 1999, Albertsons completed its acquisition of American Stores, owner of Buttrey from 1984 to 1990, for $8 billion.

== Incidents ==
In July 1985, an Anaconda, Montana, woman opened a frozen broccoli dinner and discovered a live bomb in the packaging. Police were called and the woman claimed she purchased the frozen dinner at a Buttrey store four months prior. All of Anaconda's grocery retailers were ordered to check for similar packages; however, no other bombs were found.

In July 1987, in an angered response to the sale of Buttrey's Boise, Idaho, stores to major competitor Albertsons, an anonymous Boise woman placed a phone call to Norm Seymour, Buttrey's loss prevention officer, claiming her husband placed bombs in five Buttrey stores across Boise. Seymour contacted police and ordered store managers to evacuate all Buttrey stores in Boise. Police and sheriff deputies searched the stores, but nothing was found and the stores reopened shortly after.

== See also ==
- KFBB-TV, a television station named after a radio station founded by Frank Buttrey
