= Osco Drug and Sav-on Drugs =

Retail pharmacy chains in the United States

Osco Drug
- Type: Pharmacy/Retail
- Founded: 1937 (Rochester, Minnesota)
- Headquarters: Boise, Idaho, U.S.
- Key people: Robert Miller, Chairman and CEO
- Products: Pharmacy, Liquor, Cosmetics, Health and Beauty Aids, General Merchandise, Snacks, 1 Hour Photo
- Parent: Albertsons
- Website: acmesavonpharmacies.com jeweloscopharmacies.com shawsoscopharmacies.com

Osco Drug and Sav-on Drugs were the names of a pair of chain pharmacies that operated in the United States. Osco Drug was founded by the Skaggs family. The grocery store chain Alpha Beta was purchased by American Stores in 1961. Skaggs Drug Centers bought American Stores in 1979 and assumed the American Stores name. Sav-on Drugs was a California-based pharmacy chain that was acquired by Osco's parent company in 1980. Both Osco and Sav-on stores eventually came under the ownership of American Stores, then Albertsons, and finally SuperValu before the stores were sold off.

The Osco and Sav-on brands survive today as brandings for in-store pharmacies in the Albertsons chain of stores. Osco pharmacies can be found in Jewel stores, which are co-branded Jewel-Osco, as well as in Shaw's and Star Markets. Sav-on pharmacies are found largely in Acme stores. Pharmacies in Albertsons stores are called Osco in Arizona and Montana stores, and Sav-On in other markets, in Nevada and predominantly in Texas for example.

== History ==
Osco Drug logo

=== Roots ===
In 1915, S.M. Skaggs, a Baptist minister, opened a grocery store in American Falls, Idaho, with lower prices on goods. In 1917, O.P Skaggs started a chain of self-service stores, and later sold the franchise in the western states to Christian Call. In 1926, the Skaggs brothers merged the chain with Sam Seelig stores, which had become Safeway in 1925. L.J. Skaggs retired from Safeway in 1932, and in 1934, he opened the first self-service drugstore in the US in Tacoma, Washington.

=== First store ===
Loronzo L. (L.L.) Skaggs owned a controlling stock in a company called Quality Food in Minnesota and subsequently left the Safeway business. L.L. opened a chain of self-service drugstores in the Midwest similar to his brother L.J.'s stores in the west. The first store opened in 1937 in Rochester, Minnesota, and was named "Pay-Less" (different from the drug chain Payless founded later in the century), and was managed by George Hilden. The store remained in operation until 1987, when it closed due to redevelopment in downtown Rochester.

In 1937, while in the process of opening a second store in Mason City, Iowa, it was learned that another company had already registered the name "Payless" in the state. L.L changed "Payless" to "Self-Service Drug, Inc." and formed a new corporation.

=== Name change to Osco ===
In 1942, the corporation "Self-Service Drug, Inc." was dissolved and succeeded by "Owners Service Company", a partnership of L.L Skaggs, H.B. Finch, Paul Stratton and George Hilden. From this company 'Osco' was coined. That year Osco moved its headquarters from Waterloo, Iowa, to the Merchandise Mart in Chicago, Illinois.

== Sav-on Drugs ==
Sav-on Drugs was a Southern California-based drugstore chain that was founded by Christian J. Call in San Bernardino, in July 1945. Ira D. Brown served as general manager. The chain was the second largest California-based drugstore chain in Southern California at the time it was acquired by The Jewel Companies in November 1980.

In October 1947, the third store in the chain opened in Long Beach. The store was managed by Ronald L. Call while the chain was co-owned at that time by Christian J. Call and Alton D. Clark

The seventh store was opened in South Gate in September 1948.

In June 1952, the ninth store opened in Lakewood.

The tenth store of the chain opened in Gardena in October 1952.

Founder and president Christian Call died on January 11, 1958. He was replaced by his nephew Ronald Call.

The 27th store was opened in the North Hills Shopping Center in Granada Hills in July 1959.

The 35th store in the chain was opened in the Park Western Shopping Center in San Pedro in September 1963.

The United States Department of Justice filed an anti-trust lawsuit against Sav-On's rival Thrifty Drug Stores in Federal Court in August 1962 to force Thrift to divest itself of its 28.75% stock it owned in Sav-On Drugs, Inc. In December 1964, Thrifty Drug Stores sold its almost 30% stake in its rival Sav-On back to Sav-On that it had acquired since 1958.

The company's general offices were moved from downtown Los Angeles to a new building in Marina del Rey in 1967.

The company's second president, Ronald L. Call, died in March 1968 and was replaced by Ira Brown.

Sav-on opened its 64th store in Torrance in July 1971.

In November 1972, Sav-On Drugs stock began trading on the New York Stock Exchange under the symbol SVN.

The 77th store was opened in Marina del Rey in January 1974.

Sav-on opened its 98th store in Carson in October 1975. Except for four stores in Houston, Texas, the other 94 stores were located in California.

The 100th store was opened in Santa Clarita in December 1975.

Sav-On purchased the inventories, fixtures, leasehold improvements, and other assets for 15 Pay Less Drug Stores in Southern California from the Oakland-based Pay Less in March 1978. The new stores were mostly located in Orange and San Diego counties. Sav-On had 112 stores prior to the sale and 127 after including the former Pay Less stores. All 127 stores were located in Southern California except for five in Houston, Texas. The chain also had plans of opening stores in Las Vegas, Nevada, in the near future.

In 1978, Sav-On acquired a warehouse in Anaheim in which the company remodel it to be a new warehouse distribution site and also as the site of its new corporate headquarters to replace it previous offices in Marina del Rey.

By August 1980, the Sav-on had a total of 141 stores, which includes 130 in California, 6 in Houston, and 5 in Las Vegas.

In October 1980, Sav-on opened its 146th store in Orange.

Sav-on opened its 148th store in the South Gate Shopping Center Plaza in South Gate, in June 1981.

== Acquisitions ==
=== The Jewel Companies, Inc. ===
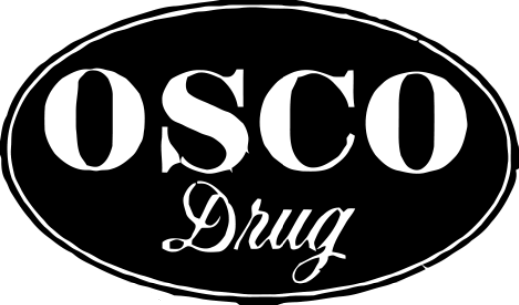
Osco Drug logo until 1980

In 1961, The Jewel Companies, Inc. acquired the 30 Osco Drug stores in six Midwest states. In 1962, Osco's headquarters was moved from Chicago's Merchandise Mart to Melrose Park, Illinois, and the first side-by-side "Jewel-Osco" store opened. The early Jewel-Osco combination (combo) stores were two individual stores, separated by an interior wall (and in some locations, a half-wall), allowing a customer to go back and forth between each store without having to go outside. The first Jewel-Osco Family Center was opened in Chicago's Appleton Plaza Shopping center in January 1962.

The first Eisner-Osco Family Center was opened in West Lafayette, Indiana, in September 1970.

The first Osco Drug store to open adjacent to an existing Buttrey Food store occurred in Anaconda, Montana, in July 1967. The first example of a purpose-built Buttrey-Osco Family Center occurred with the opening in Boise in September 1969.

The first Star-Osco Family Center opened in Manchester, New Hampshire, in October 1970.

After the merger, all of Jewel's subsidiaries soon had an Osco Drug. Some Eisner Food Stores locations were re-branded "Eisner-Osco". When Jewel acquired Star Market in 1964, the first Osco Drug in New England was opened, and some were next to Star Market locations and were branded as "Star-Osco". By 1968, Osco grew to 168 stores in sixteen states. During most of the 1960s, Osco operated as two divisions – 'City Osco', comprising the Chicago, Illinois, and Chicago suburb stores and 'Country Osco' (all the other Oscos). These two divisions were combined in 1968 and formed Osco Drug, Inc. Also in 1968, Osco's headquarters relocated from Melrose Park, Illinois to Franklin Park, Illinois. Later that year, the Jewel Imports procurement group was established to import a broad range of general merchandise from around the world to sell in Osco stores.

When The Jewel Companies Inc. acquired Montana-based Buttrey Food Stores in 1966, many of the stores were converted to a combination store format and bannered as "Buttrey-Osco" with common checkout stands but separate store management, all under one roof. By the early 1980s, Buttrey eventually operated 60 stores in Montana, North Dakota, western Minnesota, Wyoming, eastern Washington, eastern Oregon and Idaho. Buttrey stores were spread thinly over a 1,500-mile (2,400 km) wide territory from the Cascades to the Red River Valley.

Outside of the Chicago metropolitan area, Osco operated stand-alone pharmacies (or free standing stores). In the early years, many of the Jewel and Osco combination stores maintained different operating hours from one another and on certain days such as holidays, one side of the combo store would be open, while the other would be closed. By the early 1980s, new and remodeled combo stores had the 'wall' removed and the store became one, and to this day, Osco retains control over drug, general merchandise, pharmacy and liquor departments in the Jewel Osco combo stores.

In the late 1960s, Osco was seeking to purchase or build a photofinishing plant to service its stores. At the time, the company was using outside vendors, and the film developing quality and service was inconsistent. In 1970, working with Kodak, Osco built a photofinishing lab in Elgin, Illinois. The facility, Crest Photo Lab opened in 1971, and serviced Osco's Chicago, Central and Eastern region stores. The Elgin photo lab expanded several times over the years. As both Osco and its photofinishing market share grew, three more photo plants were added: Alves Photo Service Braintree, Massachusetts, in 1980, Rich Photo Lab Salt Lake City, Utah, in 1984 and Drewry Photocolor Burbank, California, in 1987 (renamed Crest Photo in 1988). The photo labs were sold to Kodak's Qualex photo processing division in 1996, prompted by the emergence of in-store one-hour photo labs and digital photography technology.

In 1974, Osco's headquarters were relocated from Franklin Park, Illinois, to a new facility at 1818 Swift Drive in Oak Brook, Illinois.

==== Acquisition of Sav-on Drugs ====
Sav-on Drugs logo

In November 1980, The Jewel Companies Inc. purchased Sav-on Drugs, Inc. which was headquartered in Anaheim, California, and had 150 stores in California, Nevada and Texas. The Sav-on chain became Osco's 'Western Region'.

=== American Stores Company ===
In 1984, American Stores Company, which consisted of Alpha Beta, Acme Markets, and Skaggs, acquired The Jewel Companies Inc.

==== American Drug Stores, Inc. ====
In 1989, a new subsidiary, American Drug Stores, Inc., was formed and consisted of American Stores drugstore holdings of Osco Drug, Sav-on Drugs, the Osco side of the Jewel-Osco food-drug combination stores and RxAmerica. RxAmerica began earlier in 1989 as a mail service prescription fulfillment center with a facility in Salt Lake City, Utah.

==== Sav-on re-branding and relaunching ====
American Stores had a strategy to build a nationwide network of pharmacies, streamline operations and advertising to gain national recognition for the brand, especially for the high-margin private label products. The name Osco Drug was chosen as the national chain banner because of the large number of stores which already had that name and existed in various parts of the US. The name change was completed for the Skaggs drugstores in 1985 and then for the Sav-on stores in 1986. The name "Osco" did not resonate well with Sav-on's Southern California customer base. American Stores eventually made the decision to change the name of the former Sav-on stores back to Sav-on Drugs. Rumors circulated at the time claiming that the reason for the name change back to "Sav-on" was due to "Osco" having the same pronunciation as the Spanish word asco (oss-ko), which means "nausea" or "disgust", a considerable factor within Southern California's heavily Hispanic market. This explanation for the name change was refuted by American Stores.

The name change on all stores was completed in 1989, and the Sav-on Drugs brand was re-launched in Southern California and Nevada.

==== Sav-on Express, Reliable Drug, Clark Drug ====
At the same time that the company was making major divestments in the early 1990s, American Stores also looked for opportunities to make strategic minor acquisitions that would enhance its position in the main markets where it needed to strengthen market share.

- The company's California drugstore operations were enhanced through the early 1992 $60 million purchase of 85 CVS Stores (63 CVS Pharmacy drugstores and the rights to operate 22 CVS health and beauty aid stores) from the Melville Corporation. These stores converted to the Sav-on Drugs and Sav-on Express banners. Later that year, 30 Thrifty and Rx Plus drugstores in Arizona and Nevada were acquired.
- The following year Reliable Drug (a 55 unit chain) in Indiana, Illinois, Iowa, Kansas, and Missouri was bought. These stores were soon re-bannered as Osco Drug stores.
- In February 1995, American Stores spent about $37 million for 17 Clark Drug stores in southern California, which were then converted to the Sav-on Drugs name.

==== Consolidation of operations ====
In 1992, American Stores shifted its strategy from that of a holding company to a centralized operating company. As a result of the decision, common functions among American Stores' operating divisions (procurement, distribution logistics, payroll, human resources, etc.) were removed from the operating divisions, consolidated and run centrally. From 1992 through 1998, American Stores consolidated operations and moved responsibilities of their division offices to their headquarters in Salt Lake City, Utah. Although 'American Stores' food divisions retained an operating presence in their geographical locations and other centralized marketing, merchandising and other staff functions were relocated between 1992 and 1998 from Oak Brook, Illinois, to Salt Lake City to occupy the then-new American Stores Tower. Pharmacy operations were relocated to Scottsdale Arizona with certain pharmacy systems-related resources continuing to operate from the Chicago area after being relocated to 3030 Cullerton Drive in Franklin Park, Illinois.

After American Drug Stores' move to Salt Lake City, Utah, was complete in 1998, Osco's Oak Brook, Illinois, 1818 Swift Drive headquarters was sold to the Follett Corporation.

==== Osco Foodmarts ====
In 1994, American Stores converted 25 Jewel Food Stores in Chicago, Illinois, to Osco Drug free-standing stores. These older and smaller Jewel stand-alone stores were closed so that American Stores could focus on the combination formats only for Jewel and to expand Osco's presence in Chicago as a response to Walgreens increasing market dominance. The Osco stores replacing the Jewel stores contained expanded food and produce presentations and were coined 'Osco Foodmarts'.

==== Health 'n' Home ====
To extend its core drugstore business, in November 1995 American Drug Stores launched a new format called Health 'n' Home, which was a 28,000-square-foot (2,600 m^{2}), 18,000-item home health care superstore. The first Health 'n' Home opened in Phoenix, Arizona, and by late 1997 there were 20 Health 'n' Home stores in four states.

==== RxAmerica ====
In 1998, American Stores RxAmerica division and Longs Drug Stores Integrated Health Concepts (IHC) division agreed to merge their Pharmacy Benefits Management (PBM) ventures. Under terms of the joint venture, RxAmerica and its former corporate partner, Geneva Pharmaceuticals, parted ways, and RxAmerica combined with Longs' IHC division in a 50/50 partnership. The alliance created a national PBM of nearly 1,400 Longs and American Stores pharmacy outlets and a nationwide network of 40,000 pharmacies serving some 3 million patients under contract. Longs and Albertsons remained equal partners up though 2001, when Albertsons sold their 50% interest to Longs.

== Albertsons, Inc. ==
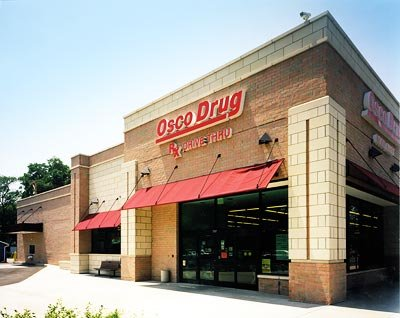
A typical freestanding Osco Drug

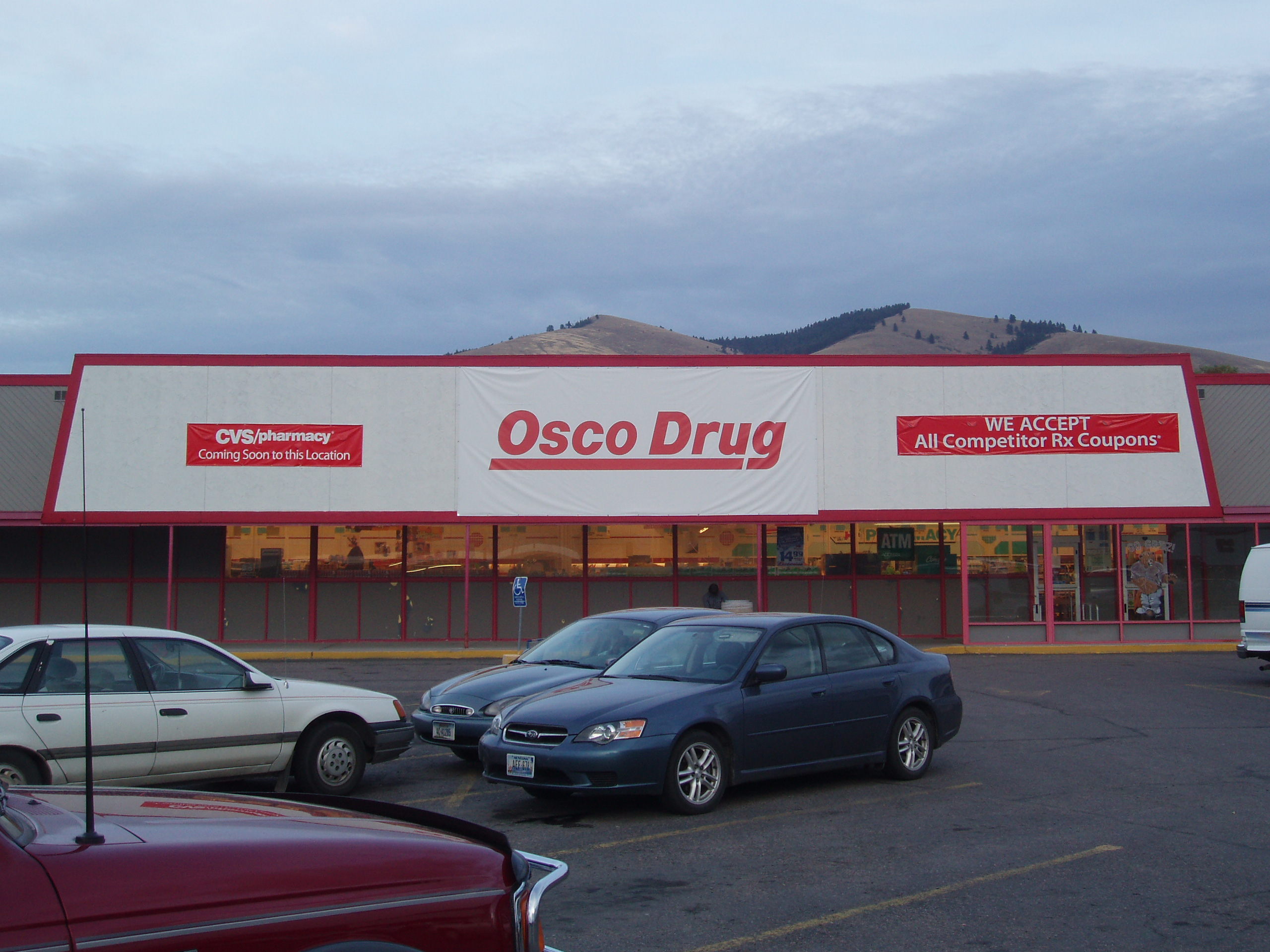
An Osco Drug before becoming CVS Pharmacy in Missoula, Montana

During 1999, the drugstore operations division and general merchandise procurement functions were moved from Salt Lake City, Utah, to Scottsdale, Arizona, operating as Albertsons Drug Region.

In 2002, Albertsons sold its 84 free-standing Osco Drug stores in Massachusetts, New Hampshire and Maine to the Jean Coutu Group, a Canadian drugstore company. Jean Coutu re-branded the acquired Osco stores as Brooks Pharmacy. Also in 2002, Albertsons, due to financial difficulties, closed several of its stores across the country including all stores in the Des Moines, Iowa, metro market.

In March 2005, Albertsons re-introduced the Osco brand name to the New England region by way of its Shaw's and Star Market pharmacies.

== SuperValu, CVS Corporation, and Cerberus ==
On June 2, 2006, the sale of Albertsons essentially split the company into three parts.

- CVS Corporation purchased the 700 free-standing drug stores (Osco Drug and Sav-on Drugs). By 2007, these stores were rebranded as CVS Pharmacy.
- A Cerberus-led group of investors (who included Kimco Realty Corporation, Schottenstein Stores Corp., Lubert-Adler Partners, and Klaff Realty) purchased the Albertsons stores in Northern California, Colorado, Texas, Oklahoma, Florida, Arizona, and New Mexico forming a new company called Albertsons LLC. Many of these stores have since been sold to other grocery chains or closed altogether.
- SuperValu purchased the Jewel, ACME, Shaw's divisions and the remaining Albertsons stores not acquired by Cerberus. SuperValu retains the Osco and Sav-on drug trademarks allowing the pharmacies in their grocery stores to remain branded as Sav-on Pharmacy or Osco Pharmacy.

The SuperValu owned Albertsons stores and the chains it acquired were in turn sold to Cerberus in 2013 and Osco and Sav-On pharmacies moved their operations to the base of Albertsons LLC in Boise, Idaho. Certain store support functions exist in the Franklin Park, Illinois, office.

== See also ==
- ACME for a history of ACME.
- Albertsons for a history of Albertsons.
- Buttrey Food Stores for a history of Buttrey Food Stores.
- Eisner Food Stores for a history of Eisner Food Stores.
- Jewel Food Stores for a history of Jewel Food Stores.
- Star Market for a history of Star Market.
