= American Stores =

American grocery store holding company

American Stores Company, Inc.
- Type: Public
- Industry: Retail
- Founded: 1917; 109 years ago
- Defunct: 1998
- Fate: Acquired by Albertsons
- Headquarters: Original company in Philadelphia, Pennsylvania; Later moved to Salt Lake City, Utah
- Area served: United States
- Products: Food, Prescriptions, Liquor, Photo, General Merchandise
- Brands: Alpha Beta; Skaggs Drug Center; Skaggs Alpha Beta
- Revenue: $19.9 billion USD (1998)
- Number of employees: 120,000
- Subsidiaries: Acme Markets; Alpha Beta; Buttrey Food & Drug; Jewel-Osco; Lucky Stores; Osco Drug; Sav-on Drugs; Star Market

American Stores Company, Inc. was an American public corporation and a holding company which ran chains of supermarkets and drugstores in the United States from 1917 through 1998. The company was incorporated in 1917 when The Acme Tea Company merged with four small Philadelphia-area grocery stores (Childs, George Dunlap, Bell Company, and A House That Quality Built) to form American Stores. In the following eight decades, the company would expand to 1,575 food and drugstores in 38 states with $20 billion (~$35.8 billion in 2024) in annual sales in 1998.

== History ==
American Stores was formed in 1917 with the merger of Acme Tea Company with four small grocery stores in Philadelphia. At the time, the Acme Tea Company had 433 stores; the S. C. Childs Company had 268 stores; the James Bell Company had 214; Robinson & Crawford had 186 stores; and the George M. Dunlap Company had 122. The leadership from Robinson & Crawford was put in charge of the combined 1,223-store chain.

By 1925, American Stores had grown to nearly 1,800 stores. In 1928, the American Stores Company purchased 305 grocery and meat stores in northern New Jersey from the United States Stores Corporation.

In 1946, a proposed acquisition of Grand Union supermarkets was turned down by Grand Union stockholders.

=== 1960s–1970s ===
In 1961, American Stores company acquired California's Alpha Beta chain of supermarkets. In the 1970s, in order to compete with lower priced grocery retailers such as ShopRite and Pathmark (competitors which did not offer trading stamps), Acme Markets launched its Super Saver discount grocery chain in Pennsylvania.

American Stores itself was acquired in 1979 by the Skaggs Companies, Inc. The merged company was headquartered at Skaggs' base in Salt Lake City, Utah. However, it took the American Stores name.

American Stores was by far the larger organization, with 758 supermarkets, 139 drugstores, 53 restaurants, and 9 general merchandise stores in nine states when compared to the 241 Skaggs stores. Although the resulting entity bore the American Stores Company name, it was controlled by Skaggs management headed by Leonard S. Skaggs Jr. more familiarly known as Sam Skaggs.

Stores in several markets having both an Alpha Beta supermarket and a Skaggs Drug Center were combined (or expanded) to combination food and drug stores and re-branded Skaggs Alpha Beta.

=== 1980s ===
American Stores posted $83 million in earnings on sales of nearly $8 billion in 1983. But its presence was still weak in the Midwest, New England, and Florida.

==== Acquisition of the Jewel Companies ====
In June 1984, American Stores acquired Jewel Companies, Inc. for $1.1 billion. L. S. Skaggs would be chairman and CEO of the combined company, while Jewel chairman Weston Christopherson and other executives were forced out. Skaggs had previously discussed a merger with the company in 1966 and again in 1978.

To help raise cash for the deal, American Stores sold its Rea and Derick, Inc. subsidiary of 134 drugstores in December 1984 to People's Drug, a division of Imasco Limited. It also sold 33 Alpha Beta grocery stores in Arizona sold to ABCO Foods. Another 22 Alpha Beta grocery stores and support facilities in northern California were also sold.

The acquisition of the Jewel Companies, Inc. consisted of the Illinois-based Jewel Food Stores supermarket chain and Osco Drug, Inc., Massachusetts-based Star Market, California-based Sav-on Drugs, Montana-based Buttrey Food Stores, and White Hen. The Osco Drug and Sav-on Drugs chains were previously founded by the Skaggs family. This merger added 193 supermarkets, 358 drugstores, 140 combination food and drug stores, 301 convenience stores, and 132 discount stores to American Stores' holdings.

The company found itself in legal trouble through its new subsidiary. A salmonella food-poisoning outbreak affecting some 20,000 people in the Midwest was traced to Jewel's Hillfarm Dairy that supplied tainted milk to Jewel stores in March and April 1985. In 1987, Jewel was found not liable for punitive damages in Illinois Cook County Circuit Court but agreed to pay compensatory damages estimated at $35 to $40 million.

In 1985, American Stores sold the White Hen chain, since convenience stores did not fit into the company's plans. Buttrey Food & Drug and Star Market were put up for sale in order to raise capital and pay down debt. Although the company continued to operate these subsidiaries, investment in remodeling and new construction for these stores and for Acme Markets was minimal throughout the 1980s.

By 1987, American Stores Company was the largest drug retailer in the United States, but only the third-largest grocery retailer and underperforming its peers. In October 1987, the company exited the Idaho and Washington drugstore markets with the sale of 25 Osco Drug units to Pay Less Drug Stores.

==== Sav-on name change ====
Following the acquisition of Jewel, American Stores used the Osco Drugs name in its effort to build a nationwide network of pharmacies. In February 1985, it was announced that the Skaggs Drug Center stores located in the Northwest would be rebranded under the Osco name. In August 1986, the company's 184 Sav-on stores in California were also renamed Osco Drug, giving the chain 645 stores nationwide.

The name 'Osco' did not resonate well with Sav-on's southern California customer base. By 1989, American Stores had made the decision to change the former Sav-on stores back to their original name. Rumors at the time claimed the reason was that 'Osco' has the same pronunciation as the Spanish word 'asco' (oss-ko), which means disgust or loathing, a considerable factor within southern California’s heavily Hispanic market. This explanation for the name change was refuted by American Stores.

==== Acquisition of Lucky Stores ====
In March 1988, American Stores made an unsolicited tender offer for Lucky Stores, an Alpha Beta competitor noted for high efficiency and low prices. American Stores’ Alpha Beta chain in California was struggling, plagued by high prices and a reputation for poor service. At the time, Lucky was California's leading grocery retailer, due in part that it was the only chain with a significant presence in both northern California and southern California.

Lucky refused American Stores' first offer. Within a month, American Stores proposed to up its bid if Lucky would agree to a friendly takeover. Again Lucky management rejected the offer as inadequate and was said to be contemplating defensive strategies. Later, American Stores upped its bid to $2.5 billion, or $65 per share. Lucky accepted and American Stores was on track to become the largest supermarket chain in the United States, over the Kroger and Safeway chains.

The acquisition included then Dublin, California-based Lucky Stores, with stores in California, Nevada, and Arizona; Tampa-based Kash n' Karry, with stores in Florida; and a minority interest in Milan, Illinois-based Eagle Food Centers.

In August 1988, California attorney general John Van de Kamp asked the Federal Trade Commission to void the sale, claiming that a Lucky-Alpha Beta juggernaut would cost California consumers $400 million (~$913 million in 2024) by reducing competition. The Federal Trade Commission approved the merger and Van de Kamp then initiated a lawsuit against American Stores to stop it. In September 1988, a federal judge in Los Angeles issued a preliminary injunction against the merger. At the same time, the FTC ordered the companies to divest 37 Alpha Beta and Lucky stores to appease antitrust concerns. American Stores appealed, and in April 1989, a Ninth Circuit panel in San Francisco overturned the injunction. Van de Kamp appealed this reversal to the U.S. Supreme Court. Meanwhile, American Stores continued to plan its integration of Lucky while it waited for the district court to lift the injunction as ordered by the Ninth Circuit.

However, on August 22, 1989, Associate Justice Sandra Day O'Connor, in her capacity as Circuit Justice for the Ninth Circuit, issued an interlocutory order staying the Ninth Circuit's issuance of its mandate back to the district court, which kept the preliminary injunction in place. After oral argument on January 19, the U.S. Supreme Court ultimately ruled in favor of the state on April 30, 1990.

Wishing to avoid additional lengthy litigation, the following month American Stores reached an agreement with Van de Kamp whereby the company was allowed to convert 14 Alpha Beta stores to the Lucky name but also had to sell 161 southern California stores (152 Alpha Beta stores and 9 Lucky stores) within five years. The deal put no restrictions on American Stores' future growth in California and did not require state approval of the buyer or terms of the sale.

In 1989, Kash n' Karry was acquired by its management from American Stores for $305 million (~$670 million in 2024). American Stores also sold the minority interest in Eagle Food Centers that it had acquired from Lucky and sold it to New York-based Odyssey Partners.

==== Headquarters move to Southern California ====
American Stores relocated its corporate headquarters from Salt Lake City to Irvine, California, in July 1988. At the time, the company indicated the reason for the move was to place the headquarters in one of the company's major operating market areas and therefore closer to its business interests. However, the corporate headquarters was moved back to Salt Lake City in 1989 with little explanation.

==== Jewel-Osco Florida ====
On March 16, 1989, the company opened a 75,000-square-foot Jewel-Osco combination store in Largo, Florida. This marked American Stores’ re-entry into the Southeast after an absence of nearly two decades. Mark S. Skaggs, son of L.S. Skaggs, was president of the new Jewel-Osco of Florida division.

This was a wholly separate division of the company and was not part of the Jewel Food Stores chain in the midwest or the Osco/American Drug Stores subsidiary. Unlike the combination stores in the midwest, where Jewel ran the food side of the combination stores and Osco ran the drug side, the Florida stores were run by a one overall manager, similar to the way a Skaggs Alpha Beta store was managed.

Only six Jewel-Osco stores were opened in Florida and all were sold to Albertsons in 1992 as part of a $300 million deal to offload 74 stores and an Oklahoma distribution center. As a result, American left Texas, Arkansas, Oklahoma, and Florida.

==== Formation of American Drug Stores, Inc. ====
In 1989, a new subsidiary American Drug Stores, Inc. was formed and consisted of American Stores drugstore holdings of Osco Drug, Sav-on Drugs, and the Osco side of the Jewel-Osco food-drug combination stores.

In 1997, American Drug Stores and Longs Drugs merged their pharmacy benefit managers to create RxAmerica. Each company held 50% ownership of the new entity. By 2001, Longs acquired full control.

=== 1990s ===
In the early 1990s, reducing the $3.4 billion in debt load became the prime challenge for the company; doing so was mainly accomplished through asset sales. By the end of fiscal 1992, long-term debt was down from $3.4 billion to $2.1 billion.

==== Divestitures ====
In the early 1990s, American Stores divested several properties. In November 1990, 44 Buttrey Food & Drug stores located in Montana, Wyoming, Washington, Idaho, and North Dakota by a management-led $184 million leveraged buyout. In March 1991, American Stores approved selling 51 Osco Drug stores in Colorado, Utah, and Wyoming sold to Pay Less Drug Stores, were sold in that time a division of Kmart, for $60 million. During this time, 152 Alpha Beta stores in California were sold to the Yucaipa Companies for $251 million.

The company also put its 275 unit ACME Markets chain on the block in early 1991, but soon pulled it off the market instead of selling to the company's union. In January 1992, 74 newly re-branded and remodeled Texas, Oklahoma, Florida, and Arkansas Jewel-Osco combination stores were sold to Albertsons for $455 million.

In August 1994, the Star Market grocery division was sold to Investcorp Bank for $285 million. The chain was fifth in market share in the Greater Boston area and has 33 food stores in Massachusetts and Rhode Island at the time. American Stores deemed Star Market expendable because the company wanted to focus on markets where it held first or second place in market share. In January 1995, the company sold 45 Acme Markets located in New York and northern Pennsylvania to the Penn Traffic Company for $94 million.

==== Acquisitions ====
While making major divestments, American Stores also looked for opportunities to make strategic minor acquisitions to strengthen market share in key areas. In December 1991, American Drug Stores acquired 85 CVS Stores in California from the Melville Corporation. These stores converted to the Sav-on Drugs and Sav-on Express banners. Later that year, 30 Thrifty and Rx Plus drugstores in Arizona and Nevada were acquired.

In May 1993, American Drug Stores announced its intention to purchase 110 Reliable Drug Stores in Illinois, Indiana, Iowa, Kansas and Missouri out of bankruptcy. These stores were soon re-bannered as Osco Drug stores. In August, the company also bought the last four Thrifty drug stores in Nevada.

In December 1994, American spent about $37 million for 17 Clark Drug stores in southern California, which were then converted to the Sav-on Drugs name.

==== Transformation into an Operating Company ====
American Stores had long been run as a decentralized holding company, but in order to compete in the fierce retail environment of the 1990s the company announced its so-called Delta Plan in 1992 to transform itself into an integrated operating company. The overall goal was to turn American Stores into a more profitable national supermarket company with greater shareholder value by centralizing its buying operations, as well as putting together more food and drugstore combination stores.

As part of this transition, the company also began to centralize company-wide its procurement, warehousing, inventory control, distribution, marketing, payroll, and human resources operations. Previously, each division had its own procurement and inventory systems, so one standardized solution was introduced. This also involved the consolidation of central support organizations for store operations. At the same time, American Stores focused on opening new stores over acquisitions. This ambitious plan to create better efficiencies won a lot of support from investors.

From 1992 up through 1998, American Stores consolidated operations and moved major responsibilities of its subsidiaries to its new headquarters in Salt Lake City, Utah. By August 1998, the American Stores Tower had nearly 2,000 corporate employees. During this period, American Stores itself did not operate any food or drugstores in Utah having sold-off the Osco Drug and Alpha Beta Utah stores in 1991.

==== Super Saver Food ====
In early 1994, American Stores launched the Price Advantage discount warehouse food store concept in California. New store formats were built in Anaheim, Indio, National City, Oceanside and several existing Lucky stores were converted to this warehouse format in Sacramento, Pittsburg, Vacaville, and Woodland. However, Price Club threatened at lawsuit over name infringement, so the chain was renamed to Super Saver Food. The stores had to be swiftly renamed the night before grand openings, with the word "Price" marked out on every label, tag, and sign in the store.

Super Saver Food was a familiar brand which had been used in the 1970s and early 1980s by Acme for their discount grocery store format in Pennsylvania and was a trademark still owned by American Stores.

==== Kap's Kitchen and Pantry ====
In 1997, the company opened Kap's Kitchen and Pantry in Salt Lake City, Utah, a prototype for entry into the high end food retail market with selections of natural and organic products, produce, seafood, grocery, meat and poultry, bakery and prepared foods. The venture was quickly abandoned and the store was closed within a year.

==== Skaggs Family Exit ====
In 1995, 72-year-old L.S. Skaggs relinquished the chairmanship of American Stores to president and CEO Victor L. Lund. Skaggs still held an 18.3 percent stake in the company and a seat on the board. In June 1996, Skaggs made it known to the SEC and he would be looking into selling his stock in the company, leading to speculation about a possible breakup or sale of American Stores. It was uncertain if Skaggs’ intention was to launch a proxy fight for control of American Stores or to alter its current management or direction.

By February 1997, an agreement was reached between American Stores and Skaggs whereby the company would repurchase about 12.2 million of Skaggs's shares for $550 million (~$995 million in 2024). The remaining shares were subsequently sold to the public through a secondary offering. This purchase reduced Skaggs’ stake in the company to five percent, insufficient ownership for him and his family members to retain seats on the company's board.

==== Acquisition by Albertsons ====
On August 3, 1998 it was announced that Albertsons would acquire American Stores for $11.7 billion (~$20.9 billion in 2024). The FTC challenged the acquisition, challenging that it would substantially lessen supermarket competition in California, Nevada, and New Mexico, resulting in higher prices or reduced quality and selection for consumers. As a condition of the sale, Albertsons' and American Stores agreed to sell 144 supermarkets (104 Albertson's supermarkets, 40 American Stores' Lucky supermarkets) in 57 markets. The divestiture agreement, at the time, was the largest retail divestiture ever required by the FTC.

Due to the mandated sale of stores, the acquisition took nearly a year to complete. In June 1999, the acquisition was complete, ASC was de-listed on the New York Stock Exchange and American Stores ceased to exist. The combined company consisted of 2,400 food and drug stores located in 38 states.

During 1999, the drugstore operations division and general merchandise procurement functions were moved from Salt Lake City to Scottsdale, Arizona, operating as Albertsons Drug Region. The functions which supported the food divisions were consolidated and moved from Salt Lake City to Albertsons' headquarters in Boise.

For a very short time after the American Stores acquisition was completed, Albertsons was the largest food/drug chain in the United States until Kroger's acquisition of Fred Meyer completed that fall. Albertsons preserved the Acme Markets, Jewel-Osco, Osco Drug and Sav-on Drugs namesakes. In November 1999, Albertsons announced it would rebrand the Lucky stores under the Albertsons name because both chains had stores and overlap in northern and southern California. (The Lucky brand would be revived in 2006 by SuperValu).
