= Super Saver Foods =

American grocery store chain

Super Saver Foods, Inc.
- Company type: Subsidiary
- Industry: Grocery
- Founded: 1970 (56 years ago)
- Defunct: 2006 (all states except Utah); 2018 (Utah)
- Fate: Closed; two Utah locations rebranded as Lucky
- Parent: Albertsons

Super Saver Foods was an American price-impact grocery franchise. It was owned by Albertsons LLC. It was a no-frills grocery store where the customers bagged their own groceries at the checkout.

== History ==
=== Acme version ===
Super Saver was a brand launched by the Acme grocery chain in 1970 on the East Coast as discount format grocery stores. The format was established in order to compete with lower priced grocery retailers, such as ShopRite and Pathmark (competitors which did not offer trading stamps). The brand was retired in 1982 (though some isolated stores retained the signage into the early 1990s).

=== American Stores version ===
American Stores logo

In 1994, American Stores Company, parent company of Acme and Lucky food stores decided to start a discount format grocery store chain in California. They built new stores in Southern California (Indio, Oceanside, Anaheim, and National City), and converted about six Lucky stores, (three in Sacramento and one each in Pittsburg, Vacaville, and Woodland) to the format in Northern California. Initially, American Stores named these stores Price Advantage, based on the Lucky Advantage prototype store in Escondido, California. Price Club sued American Stores over name infringement shortly before the grand openings. The stores were swiftly rebranded Food Advantage the night before Grand Openings, with the word "Price" marked out with a thick ink marker on every label, tag and sign in the store. A scaled down warehouse store, Food Advantage featured no bakery or deli, with its concept modeled in a similar fashion to Food 4 Less stores.

In the coming months, American Stores would rebrand these stores as Food/Price Advantage. Finally, American Stores decided to rebrand them as Super Saver, bringing back the familiar logo that had been used decades earlier in Philadelphia.

In 1999, Albertsons purchased American Stores. A number of the Super Saver stores were divested to satisfy anti-trust concerns, but a few remained. By 2003, the only remaining Super Saver stores still operated by Albertsons were in Indio (closed in 2005), Woodland (closed in 2006) and Gonzales, Louisiana (closed in 2006).

=== Albertsons version ===
In 2003, Albertsons then announced that they would be developing a new Hispanic format in Southern California, and would be calling it Super Saver. A few Albertsons stores converted to Super Saver, as well as a Max Foods location near the Mexico border in San Ysidro.

In 2004, Albertsons announced that they were creating a discount grocery store division that would operate initially in Texas, Louisiana, and Florida. This division would be an independent operating subsidiary of Albertsons known as EXTREME, Incorporated. These stores would be converted poorly performing former Albertsons stores and the name used on the store would be Super Saver. At this time, the Super Saver logo was redesigned. Albertsons also rebranded two former Food 4 Less stores in Utah to Super Saver at this time, but continued to use other names for discount format stores in Colorado and parts of California (Max Foods and Grocery Warehouse). The Super Saver stores offered Acme products for private label goods rather than the Albertsons brand, much as the original Acme Super Saver chain sold the company's Alpha Beta products instead of the Acme Ideal brand of the time.

In 2006, Albertsons was dissolved as a company. The EXTREME group was sold to Cerberus Capital Management, which became known as Albertsons LLC. That same year, Cerberus made a decision to close the entire Super Saver store chain on August 1, except for the two Utah stores. In 2018, the last remaining Super Saver stores in West Valley City and Salt Lake City (which were formerly Food 4 Less) were rebranded to Lucky, bringing an end to the Super Saver brand.

== See also ==
- List of companies based in Idaho
