= Acme Markets =

American supermarket chain

Acme Markets Inc.
- Type: Subsidiary
- Industry: Retail
- Founded: 1891 (135 years ago) in Philadelphia, Pennsylvania
- Headquarters: East Whiteland Township, Pennsylvania, United States
- Number of locations: 159
- Key people: Susan Morris (CEO)
- Products: Bakery; dairy; deli; frozen foods; general grocery; meat; pharmacy; produce; seafood; snacks; liquor; health; beauty
- Parent: American Stores (1917–1998); Albertsons (1999–present)
- Website: acmemarkets.com

Acme Markets Inc. is an American supermarket chain, originating in Philadelphia, Pennsylvania, and operates 159 stores throughout Pennsylvania, Connecticut, Delaware, Maryland, New Jersey, and the Hudson Valley of New York. The chain is still concentrated in the Philadelphia metropolitan area and is headquartered in East Whiteland Township, Pennsylvania, near Malvern, a Philadelphia suburb. As of 1998, it is a subsidiary of Albertsons.

After many decades of being the largest grocery retailer in the Philadelphia metropolitan area, Acme fell to No. 2 behind ShopRite in 2011. As of 2013, Acme was No. 3 behind No. 1 ShopRite and No. 2 The Giant Company in the region.

== History ==
=== Early history ===
Irish immigrants Samuel Robinson and Robert Crawford founded what is now Acme in South Philadelphia in 1891. In 1917, Robinson and Crawford merged Acme Markets with four other Philadelphia-area grocery stores, including English immigrant S. Canning Childs Southern New Jersey–based American grocery chain; the new company was named American Stores. In 1927, smaller rival Penn Fruit began operating in Philadelphia's Center City. In the late 1920s, supermarkets under the American Stores banner rapidly sprouted throughout the Philadelphia region, rivaling New Jersey–based A&P, which then featured downtown stores throughout the East Coast, and as far west as New Orleans. American Stores first introduced self-service stores in shopping centers in the early 1950s.

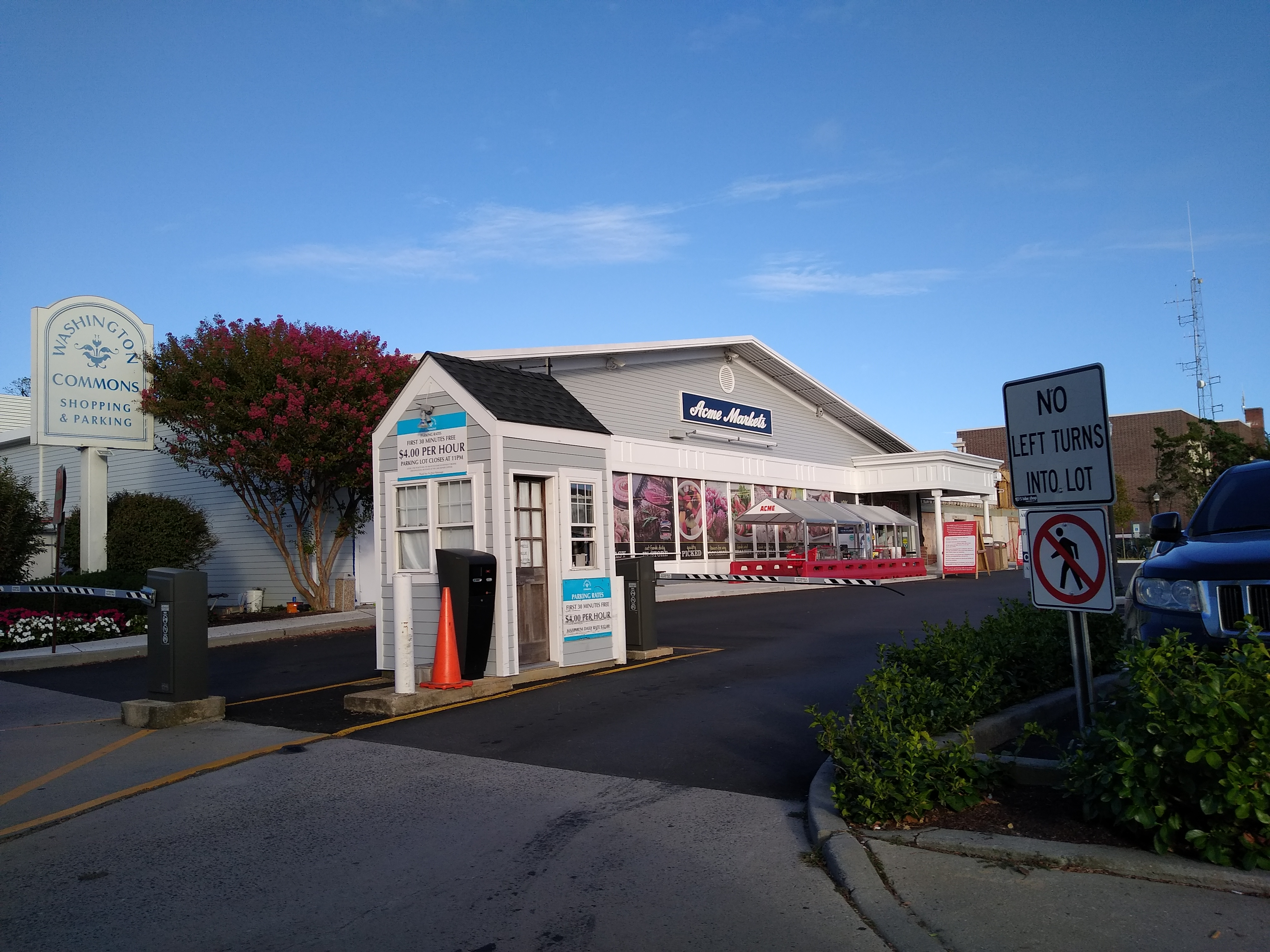
Acme in Cape May, New Jersey in September 2020 (Store #845)

=== Expansion and acquisition ===
In 1961, the American Stores company acquired Southern California's Alpha Beta chain of supermarkets. Many of Acme's stores in the 1960s and 1970s were paired with a regional drugstore chain, a PLCB liquor store (in Pennsylvania), a Kmart, or Woolco (earlier centers had a Woolworth), and in rarer cases a department store such as Sears or JCPenney. American Stores also bought the Philadelphia franchise rights to the then fast-growing restaurant chain Pizza Hut in 1968. Acme would also acquire a number of stores from Kmart Foods (as did A&P, Safeway, and Kroger); however, in the late 1970s, many recently closed 1950s-era supermarkets in Philadelphia and close suburbs were reopened as independents IGA or Thriftway/Shop 'n Bag. Starting in the 1980s, these independents were overtaken by family chains Genuardi's (later acquired by Safeway and now defunct) and Clemens (also defunct) along with Giant-Carlisle and Giant-Landover in newer suburbs, and modernized Acme, Super Fresh, and Pathmark stores in the city and older suburbs not long after.

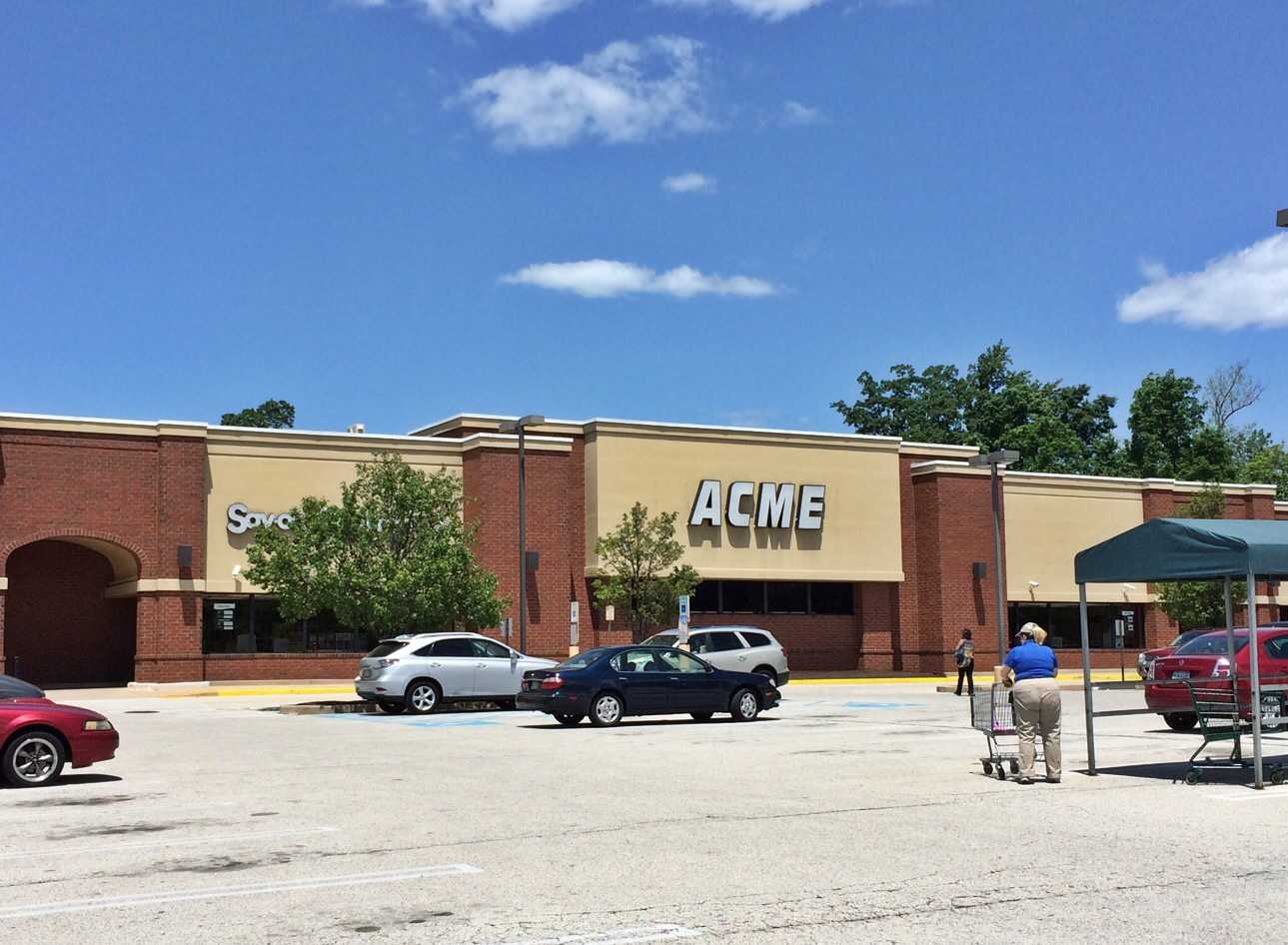
Acme in King of Prussia, Pennsylvania in May, 2014 (Store #1756). This store closed in 2018.

From 1978 to 1982, Acme acquired many stores during Food Fair's bankruptcy, including both ex-Food Fair (by then known as discount grocer Pantry Pride) and Penn Fruit units. The bulk of these dated to the 1950s. The former Food Fair/Pantry Pride stores were replaced by or remodeled into stores with the standard Acme prototype of the 1970s, as were many expanded A-Frame buildings and a few former Pathmark (these were former ShopRite) stores. Former Penn Fruit buildings, with their trademark barrel roof, could not be adapted to this model. Even many A-Frames were replaced by the often older but larger acquired stores.

In the early 1970s, Acme introduced a discount chain, Super Saver, in an effort to compete in densely populated areas. Both chains had the slogan "Acme and Super Saver - you're going to like it here!" The brand Super Saver was retired in the 1980s, only to be resurrected in the 1990s in the West. Some isolated stores retained the signage into the early 1990s, however.

American Stores were sold in 1979 to the Skaggs Companies, which took the American Stores name, moving its headquarters to Salt Lake City. Also in 1979, American Stores announced that it would be closing most of its stores in New York state. In the 1980s, American Stores undertook various acquisitions (including the Chicago metropolitan area chain Jewel Food Stores, which ran the Jewel-T chain; it operated in many former urban Acme buildings.) In 1995, Acme sold 45 stores in northeastern Pennsylvania to Penn Traffic. American Stores was acquired by major Western and Southern chain Albertsons in November 1999.

In 2006, Albertsons' supermarket holdings were bought by Cerberus Capital Management and SuperValu and divided between the two companies, with Acme going to SuperValu. In 2013 Cerberus, which was operating the Albertsons stores it owned under the name Albertsons LLC, agreed to purchase Acme from SuperValu.

In July 2016, it was announced that Albertsons had entered into a purchase agreement with Ahold and Delhaize Group to replace a Giant store in Salisbury, Maryland as part of the divestiture of stores to gain clearance from the Federal Trade Commission for the impending Ahold/Delhaize merger. The store was rebranded under the Acme banner in September 2016.

== Current and future operations ==
Acme is the third-largest food and drug retailer in the Delaware Valley, where it competes with such chains as Ahold's Giant-Carlisle, Giant-Landover, Food Lion, and Stop & Shop; Wakefern Food Corporation's ShopRite; Walmart and its warehouse club subsidiary Sam's Club; BJ's; Costco; natural/organic products retailer Whole Foods Market; Wegmans Food Markets; Trader Joe's and Aldi; and various smaller chains. Acme was the regional sales leader in the Philadelphia area for decades, and only lost its lead to ShopRite in 2011.

Acme offers online grocery shopping for orders that can be picked up at the store or, in most areas, delivered to a home or business. In 2004, Acme introduced self-checkout stands, where shoppers could scan and bag their own groceries; however, many stores (including acquired stores - see below) have had their self-checkouts removed in an effort to expand customer service. In 2008, many Acme stores began adding hot food bars to the deli section.

In July 2015, Acme's competitor A&P announced it would be filing for Chapter 11 bankruptcy protection for the second time in three years and ceasing operations after 156 years. A&P began placing many of its stores up for auction shortly thereafter, and Acme placed bids on 76 of them, eventually taking the leases to 71 stores in all from A&P's namesake brand and its subsidiaries Pathmark, Waldbaum's, Superfresh, and The Food Emporium.

== See also ==
- The Great Atlantic & Pacific Tea Company
- Super Fresh
- Weis Markets
