= Food 4 Less =

American no-frills grocery store chain owned by Kroger

Food 4 Less Holdings, Inc.
- Type: Subsidiary
- Industry: Discount Grocery Retail
- Founded: 1977; 49 years ago
- Headquarters: Compton, California, U.S.
- Number of locations: 101 (Food 4 Less), 20 (Foods Co.)
- Products: Bakery, bulk foods, dairy, delicatessen, frozen foods, general grocery, liquor, meats, produce, seafood and snacks
- Parent: Kroger
- Website: www.myfood4less.com www.foodsco.net www.food4less.com

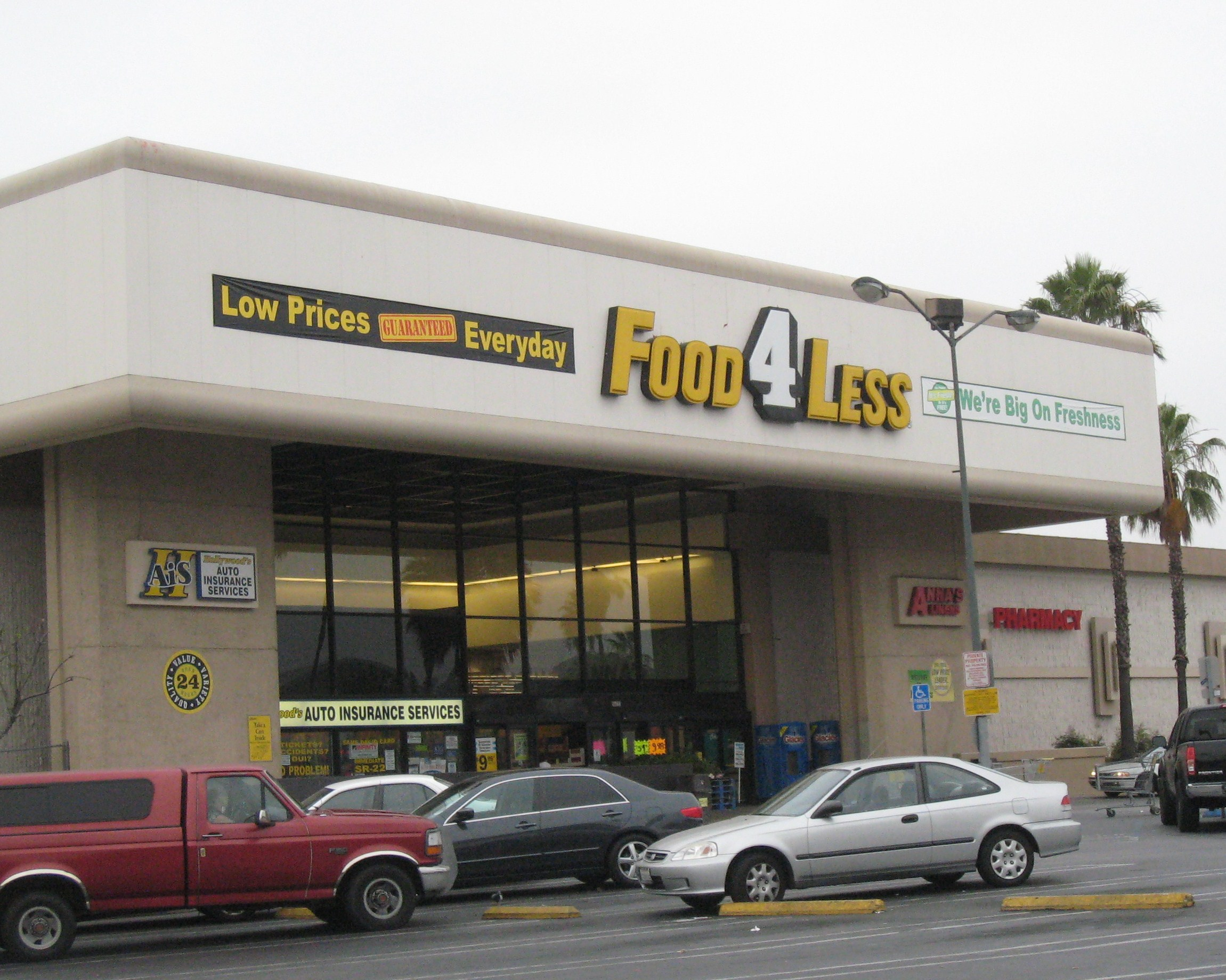
Food 4 Less grocery store in Hollywood, California. (Closed in May 2021) Building Demolished in 2023.

Food 4 Less is the name of several grocery store chains, the largest of which is currently owned by Kroger. It is a no-frills grocery store where the customers bag their own groceries at the checkout. Kroger operates Food 4 Less stores in the Chicago metropolitan area (Illinois and Indiana) and in Southern California. Kroger operates their stores as Foods Co. in northern and central California, including Bakersfield and the Central Coast, because they do not have the rights to the Food 4 Less name in those areas. Other states, such as Nevada, formerly contained Kroger-owned Food 4 Less stores.

There are other stores scattered throughout the United States with the Food 4 Less name, part of franchise agreements with various wholesalers, including Unified Western Grocers and Associated Wholesale Grocers Midwest. These stores have particular penetration in central and northern California. The Food 4 Less name was previously used by Fleming Companies, Inc., but as Fleming exited various regions and ultimately collapsed, the rights to the name went to wholesalers who picked up some of Fleming's former customers. Fleming Companies announced in April 2003 that it had filed for reorganization under Chapter 11 bankruptcy.

== Falley's ==
The Food 4 Less name and logo was originally conceived in the 1930s by Lou Falley, who developed a chain of stores both in the Food 4 Less name (with the warehouse/no frills format) and the Falley's name. The Falley's stores were full service supermarkets, while the Food 4 Less stores were warehouse stores, where labor costs were cut by having the groceries stocked to the shelves in the original cases, rather than stacking individual items. These stores were located throughout eastern Kansas and parts of northwestern Missouri. Over the years, the number of Falley's stores diminished, and were replaced with Food 4 Less stores. Falley's also franchised Food 4 Less in states where it did not operate.

In 1987, Ronald Burkle's Yucaipa Companies acquired Falley's in Topeka, Kansas. During a period of consolidation in the grocery store industry, Food 4 Less merged with Ralphs, which Fred Meyer had acquired from the Yucaipa Companies in 1998. The next year in 1999 Fred Meyer along with Food 4 Less were acquired by Kroger

In 1998, Fred Meyer sold Falley's and the Midwestern Food 4 Less stores to Associated Wholesale Grocers of Kansas City. The warehouse type stores were slowly phased out in favor of full service Food 4 Less stores with a new logo and format.

In January 2006, the AWG-owned Falley's and Food 4 Less stores located in Kansas were combined with sister company Homeland Stores, based in Edmond, Oklahoma. The company changed the names of the Food 4 Less stores, which it can't use beyond Kansas and Missouri, to AWG brands such as Price Chopper.

In 2015, Food 4 Less exited the Nevada market entirely. Six of the stores were converted to sister store Smith's Food and Drug, a prominent grocery chain owned by Kroger in the Las Vegas area. The remaining eight stores were closed.

== Nugget ==
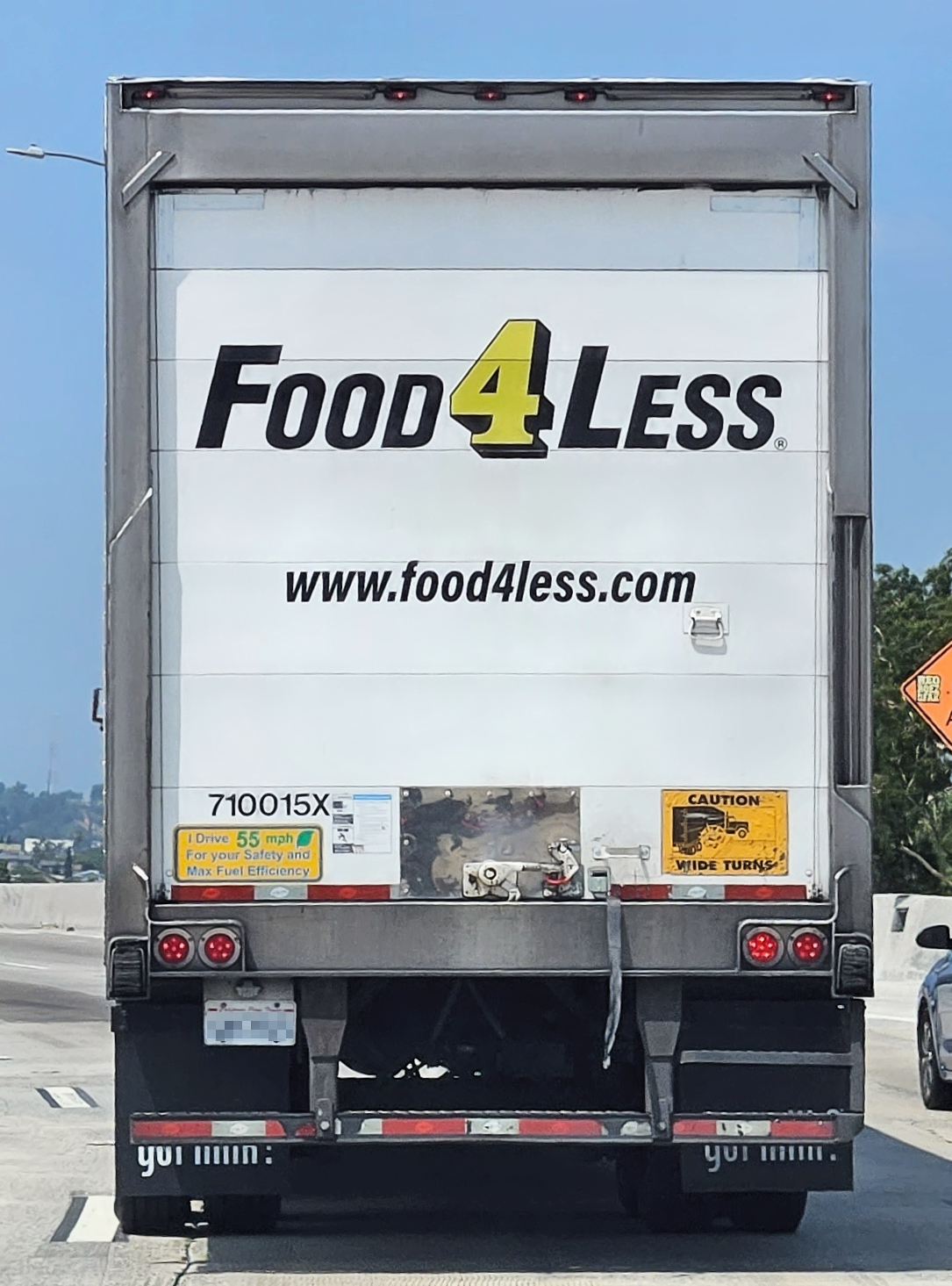
Food 4 Less semi-trailer

Kroger uses the Foods Co name in Northern California, where it is bound by an agreement between Falley's and grocer Nugget Markets, Inc. One Food 4 Less store in Northern California is managed and operated by Nugget. Kroger does not have any administrative control over the single Nugget Food 4 Less store.

Nugget's Food 4 Less is limited by its agreement with Fleming in its ability to advertise in circulars. Kroger's Food 4 Less circulars will feature individual products on sale whereas Nugget's Food 4 Less circulars only promote sales events and customer testimony. Ad prices from the Kroger Food 4 Less chain are not honored.

The Nugget Food 4 Less store also features a different selection of products than the Kroger Food 4 Less stores due to Nugget's pooling of resources from its upscale Nugget Market stores. Marketing and administration of the Nugget Food 4 Less store is handled through the Nugget Market Corporate Office in Davis, California, and any requests for other Food 4 Less stores will be deferred to the Kroger Corporate Office in Cincinnati, Ohio. It is unclear whether Nugget Markets and Kroger will continue the Fleming relationship when the franchise agreement expires.

Nugget operated a total of three stores in Northern California; in Cameron Park, Vallejo and Woodland. In 2014, the Food 4 Less in Cameron Park was converted into Fork Lift, a new store concept by Nugget. The Food 4 Less in Vallejo was shuttered on May 15, 2016, leaving the Woodland location as Nugget's sole remaining Food 4 Less store.

== Fleming ==
Fleming was another franchisee of the Food 4 Less name. In early 2003, Fleming filed for bankruptcy, causing the company to place all Fleming owned Food 4 Less stores up for bids to other national grocers. Three stores in Utah were purchased by Albertsons, who retained two stores. The two stores kept the Food 4 Less name until January 2005, when the names changed to the Albertsons owned Super Saver name. Another store in Pinole, California became a FoodMaxx, a price-impact store owned by Save Mart Supermarkets.

In Oregon, only one former Fleming store remained, in Salem which was part of the Mega Foods local chain of four stores. The remaining store was converted into Mega Foods. An independently run former Fleming store in Portland was closed in January 2013.

== PAQ, Inc. ==
PAQ, Inc., is also another franchisee of the Food 4 Less name with stores in northern California. The franchisee operates Food 4 Less stores in Arroyo Grande, Atascadero, Ceres, Lodi, Los Banos, Manteca, Paso Robles, Rio Linda, Sacramento (3 stores), Salinas, San Luis Obispo and Stockton (4 stores). Kroger also does not have any administrative control over the PAQ, Inc., Food 4 Less stores. The franchisee also operates Rancho San Miguel Markets, a supermarket specializing in Hispanic offerings.

== Gongco Foods ==
Gongco Foods operates seven franchised Food 4 Less stores in central California. The stores are located in Atwater, Fresno, Madera, Merced, Porterville, Selma and Visalia. They are also not affiliated with Kroger.

== Other ownerships ==
There are employee-owned and operated Food 4 Less stores in Joplin and Springfield, Missouri.

In Oregon, stores in Bend and Medford both operate under the Food 4 Less name, but with separate local owners. However on July 11, 2023, the store in Bend was rebranded to Local Acres Marketplace to reflect its local ownership and to differentiate it from the chain owned by Kroger, which owns the Fred Meyer chain in the U.S. Northwest.

A Food 4 Less store in Massillon, Ohio, co-owned with local grocery chain Bordner's, closed in 2014.
