= Alpha Beta =

Supermarket chain

- Logo used from 1990 until purchase by Ralphs in 1995
- Type: Subsidiary
- Industry: Retail
- Founded: 1915; 111 years ago
- Defunct: 1995; 31 years ago
- Fate: Merged with Ralphs
- Successor: Ralphs
- Products: supermarkets/food-drug stores
- Parent: American Stores

Alpha Beta was a chain of supermarkets in the Southwestern United States. Stores under this brand existed between 1917 and 1995. Former Alpha Beta stores have all been purchased by other grocery chains and rebranded.

== History ==
Logo for Skaggs Alpha Beta in the Southwest, 1979–1991

Before Alpha Beta was the name of a store, it was the name of a marketing concept used in grocery stores founded by Albert and Hugh Gerrard. It referred to organizing the groceries in the store in alphabetical order. The Gerrards applied this idea to their flagship grocery store, Triangle Grocerteria, in 1915.

Then in 1917, they opened the first Alpha Beta store in Pomona, in eastern Los Angeles County, California. The company also launched a series of coffee shops named Alphy's (a knockoff of the more formal Alpha Beta name) with dozens around southern California. They were eventually sold; many became Denny's.

The company was bought by American Stores in 1961. Skaggs Drug Centers bought American Stores in 1979 and assumed the American Stores name. Combined food and drug stores in Alpha Beta territory were re-branded as Skaggs Alpha Beta. In 1984, American Stores bought The Jewel Companies, Inc., which had owned Osco Drug since 1961.

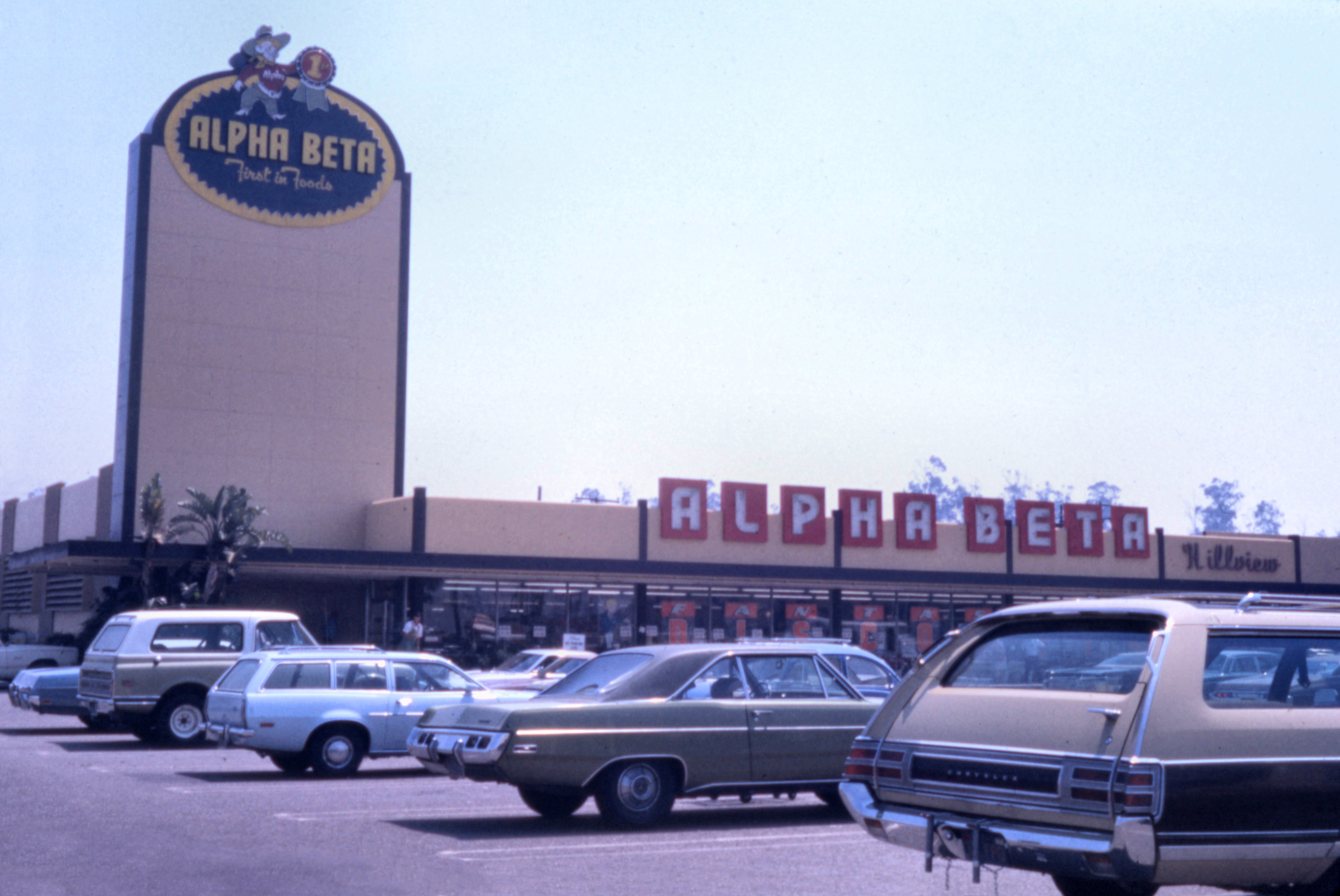
An Alpha Beta store in Santa Ana, California, in 1974

In 1984, all 34 Alpha Beta stores in Arizona were sold to ABCO Foods, and the stores continued operating under the Alpha Beta name under a temporary licensing agreement. In Tucson, Alpha Beta-branded stores changed to ABCO-branded stores around 1989.

Some Alpha Beta stores carried more than the customary supermarket merchandise. For example, in 1980, a Cupertino, California, Alpha Beta store sold Bohsei color TVs (Produced by Samsung Electronics Co. for Bohsei Enterprise Co., California, USA) for under $200 (~$782.00 in 2025), Atari 400 and 800 computers, and other goods.

In September 1991, Skaggs-Alpha Beta re-branded its 76 stores in Texas, Oklahoma, New Mexico and Arkansas as Jewel-Osco, in an attempt to unify some of its subsidiaries under one nationally recognized name. Months later, Albertsons bought some of the Texas, Oklahoma, and Arkansas stores.

In 1994, Yucaipa Companies, then owner of the Alpha Beta chain in southern California, purchased the Ralphs Grocery Company. All existing Alpha Beta stores in Southern California were rebranded as Ralphs or Food 4 Less, and the Alpha Beta name ceased to be used by September 1995.

Alpha Beta stores in Northern California and San Diego County were taken over and rebranded by Lucky Stores, which in turn was acquired by Albertsons, triggering another rebranding. Many of the Northern California stores were subsequently sold in 2006 to Save Mart Supermarkets, which had acquired the rights to use the Lucky brand and logo from Albertsons, so many of the stores eventually were rebranded as Lucky.

Advertising

In the late 1970s and early 1980s, Alan Hamel was the television spokesman for the Alpha Beta grocery stores in California. Although the chain used various slogans such as "You Can't Lose" and "The Savings Don't Stop", every commercial featuring Hamel ended with him saying to the audience "tell a friend".
