= Thrifty PayLess =

Defunct American drugstore chain

Thrifty PayLess Holdings, Inc.
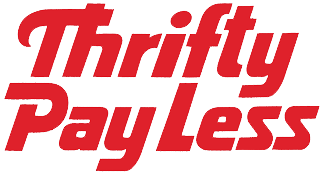
- Type: Holding company
- Industry: Retail/Pharmacy
- Predecessor: (merger of) PayLess Drug Stores (and) Thrifty Corporation
- Founded: April 1994; 32 years ago (as Thrifty PayLess Holdings, Inc.); Los Angeles, California, U.S.
- Defunct: October 15, 1996; 29 years ago (as Thrifty PayLess Holdings, Inc.); Los Angeles, California, U.S.
- Fate: Acquired by Rite Aid
- Successors: Rite Aid
- Number of locations: 1,000+
- Area served: California, Oregon, Washington, and Idaho
- Services: Pharmacy, Liquor, Cosmetics, Health and Beauty Aids, General Merchandise, Snacks, 1-Hour Photo

Thrifty PayLess Holdings, Inc. was a pharmacy holding company that owned the Thrifty Drugs and PayLess Drug Stores chains in the western United States. The combined company was formed in April 1994 when Los Angeles–based TCH Corporation, the parent company of Thrifty Corporation and Thrifty Drug Stores, Inc., acquired PayLess Drug Stores Northwest, Inc.

At the time of the merger, Thrifty operated 495 stores and PayLess operated 543 stores. TCH Corporation was renamed Thrifty PayLess Holdings, Inc. In 1996, Rite Aid acquired Thrifty PayLess Holdings.

== History of PayLess ==
Logo for PayLess Drug Stores.

=== Independence ===
In 1932, L.J. Skaggs opened Payless Drug Stores in Tacoma, Washington, which soon expanded across the western United States. In 1939, four stores were sold to his brother Samuel "L.S." Skaggs and two associates after they resigned as executives at Safeway. These stores later became known as Skaggs PayLess Drug Stores, and later part of Skaggs Companies. The stores that remained with L.J. Skaggs eventually became part of Thrifty PayLess.

During the 1940s, Peyton Hawes and William Armitage acquired five drug stores in Oregon and Washington, which were named PayLess, and grew their chain through both acquisition and internal expansion. Hawes lost two stores in the 1948 Vanport flood. By 1950, he had 11 stores across Oregon, Idaho, and Washington. By the 1960s, the Payless name was used by three separate companies: One based in Washington and Oregon, one in California, and a four-store chain in Tacoma, Washington. By 1961, Hawes had 12 stores throughout Oregon, four in Washington, one in California, and one in Idaho.

In 1967, Pay Less Drug Stores Northwest became a public company. As early as 1971, the 32-store Skaggs Pay Less Drug Stores of Oakland discussed a merger with the 39-store Pay Less Drug Stores Northwest, Inc. of Portland. The combined company would drop the Skaggs name to be called Pay Less Stores. In 1973, the company acquired Seattle-based House of Values and Portland-owned Gov-Mart Bazaar to form PayLess House of Values. In 1976, it bought 21 Value Giant stores in Northern California, Oregon, and Washington. Pay Less Drug Stores Northwest finally acquired PayLess Drug Stores of Oakland, California, in 1980. Pay Less hit $1 billion in sales in 1984.

=== Sale to Kmart ===
In 1985, the 164-store Pay Less Drug Stores Northwest Inc. was acquired by Kmart for $509 million as part of the company's expansion program created by CEO Joseph Antonini. In 1986, there were 225 PayLess stores. In 1987, the company purchased 25 Osco Drug stores in California, Idaho, Oregon, and Washington. In 1990, the company acquired Pay Less of Tacoma, Washington. By this time, PayLess operated in nine western states before its parent company was acquired by Rite Aid and the stores rebranded.

In 1992, PayLess purchased 124 Pay 'n Save stores in Washington, Alaska, Hawaii and Idaho from Pacific Enterprises. By 1993, PayLess was the 10th-largest drugstore chain in North America and operated in 12 Western states. However, by August 1993, Kmart announced it was putting Payless up for sale in order to concentrate on its core discount operations.

== History of Thrifty ==
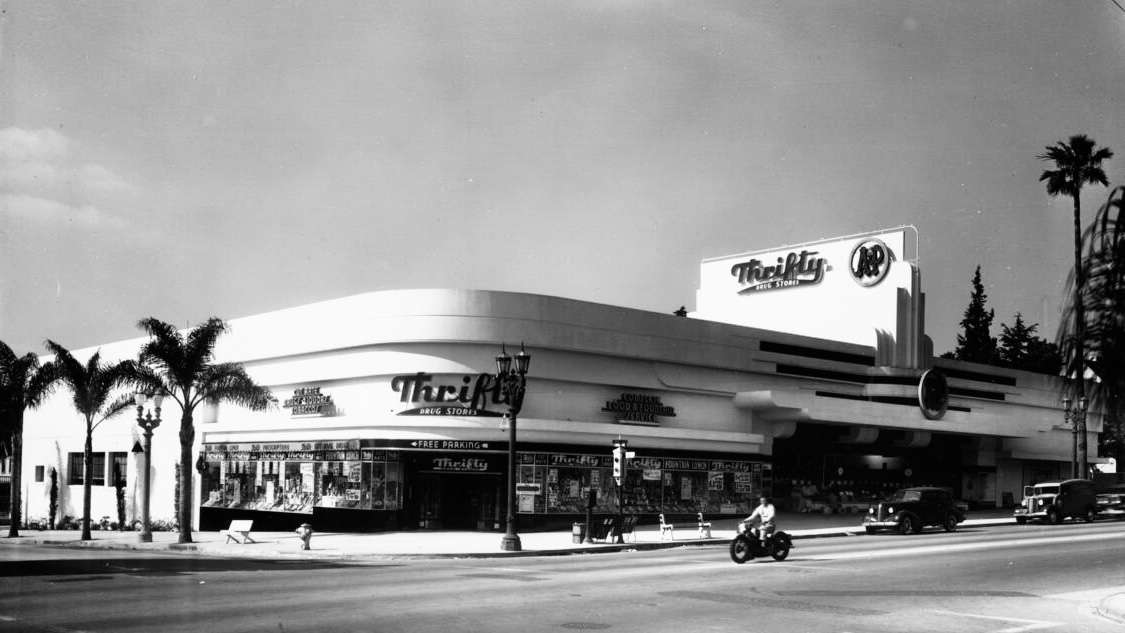
A Thrifty Drug Store at Sunset Blvd. and Fairfax Ave. in Los Angeles, c. 1939

=== Thrifty Drug Stores ===
In 1919, brothers Harry and Robert Borun, along with brother-in-law Norman Levin, founded Borun Brothers, a Los Angeles drug wholesaler. By 1929, the brothers opened their own Los Angeles retail outlets under the name Thrifty Cut Rate Drug Store. The first store was located at 412 S. Broadway in downtown Los Angeles, just across the street from the original Broadway Department Store.

After opening five additional downtown area stores, Thrifty opened its seventh store in the recently completed Pellissier Building in the Mid-Wilshire district, on Wilshire Boulevard and Western Avenue, in 1931. This was their first store outside of downtown, and it was quickly followed by several new stores within a few miles of downtown.

By 1942, Thrifty Drug Stores operated 58 stores and 78 stores in 1948. By the time its 100th store opened in Studio City in 1950, Thrifty ranged as far north as Santa Rosa, California, and as far south as San Diego. Thrifty soon expanded outside California, opening a Las Vegas location in 1952. In 1959, the chain expanded into the Pacific Northwest with a store in Eugene, Oregon.

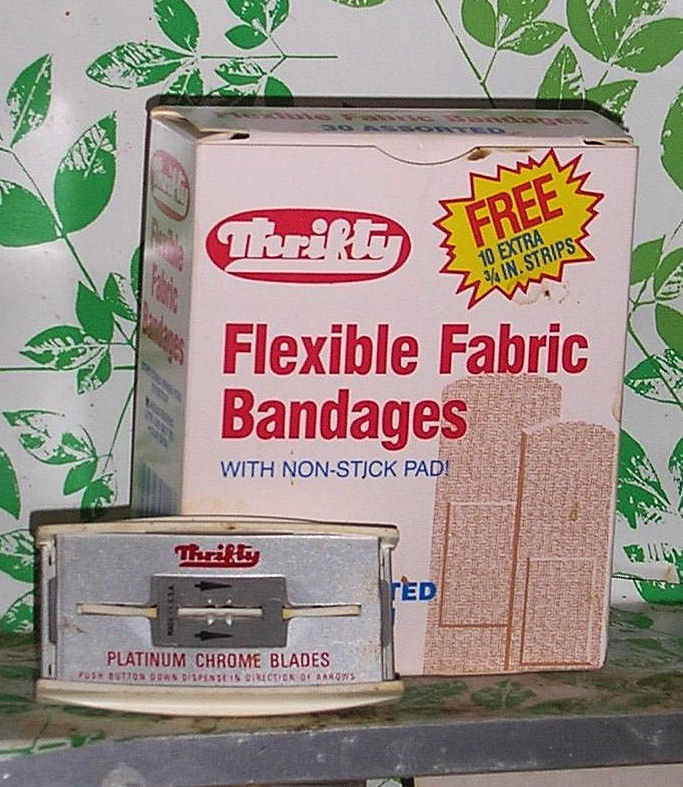
A selection of Thrifty store-branded products

Store grand opening events were always a large spectacle, with politicians as well as movie and television celebrities involved in the ceremonies. Actor Errol Flynn participated in the 1941 opening of the South Pasadena store. A neon Thrifty Drug Store sign is visible in the background of a scene from the 1954 Judy Garland version of A Star Is Born.

During the 1950s, a Thrifty commercial jingle played on numerous radio stations in Southern California:

Save a nickel, save a dime.
Save at Thrifty every time.
Save a dollar and much more,
at your Thrifty Drug Store!

=== Diversification as Thrifty Corp. ===
In the early 1970s, Thrifty's parent began to diversify outside the drug store industry through the acquisition of Big 5 Sporting Goods, a sporting goods chain, in 1972. Thrifty expanded into general merchandising by the gradual acquisition of The Akron chain, 40% in 1976, increasing to 90% the following year, and eventually to 100%.

Thrifty's parent, Thrifty Drug Stores Co. Inc., became Thrifty Corp. in 1977 to better reflect the parent company's expansion into non-pharmacy businesses through the purchase of companies such as Big 5 Sporting Goods and The Akron.

During the 1980s, Thrifty further diversified by entering into several joint ventures with Herbert Haft and his East Coast–based Dart Drug that would introduce Crown Books and Trak Auto to the West Coast. Thrifty acquired 50% ownership of Crown and had opened several bookstores in the Los Angeles area in 1981. In 1982, Thrifty sold the 21-store Akron chain to Hong Kong investors. In 1983, Thrifty acquired 50% ownership in Trak and also opened several of the auto parts stores in the Los Angeles area.

In Washington State, Thrifty went by the name of Giant T since the Thrifty name was in use by another chain of drug stores. The name was later changed to Thrifty in 1984.

In 1986, Thrifty acquired the 15-store Drug King chain in January and 13 Guild Drug stores in March. Both businesses were converted to Thrifty Jr. locations. At that time, Thrifty Corp. was made up of 550 Thrifty Drug stores and 90 Big 5 Sporting Goods stores, with interest in the 187-store Crown Books chain and 72-store Trak Auto West discount automobile parts chain. During the same year, it also acquired sports retailing brand Gart Bros.

=== Sale to Pacific Lighting ===
Thrifty Corp. was acquired by Pacific Lighting, the parent of Southern California Gas, in May 1986. At the time, this included 555 Thrifty drug stores, 27 Thrifty Jr. stores, and 89 Big 5 sporting goods stores. One of its first decisions was to sell Thrifty's shares in Crown Books and Trak Auto West. In 1988, Thrifty acquired Pay 'n Save and Bi-Mart. Following the acquisition, all Thrifty stores in Washington state were renamed to Pay 'n Save.

Thrifty close its seven remaining Utah stores in May 1989.

By the end of the decade, Thrifty Corp. was losing money for the now-renamed Pacific Enterprises. When the company's long-time president resigned in 1990, it kicked off a series of executive changes that continued through the early part of the decade. In 1991, Thrifty Corp. stores collectively lost $164 million.

=== Management buyout ===
In 1992, Pacific Enterprises ended its retailing aspirations by selling most of the Thrifty Corp. brands to investment bankers Leonard Green & Partners for $275 million as part of a management buyout. This included Thrifty Drug Stores, Bi-Mart, Big 5, Gart Bros., and MC Sporting Goods. PayLess Drug Stores, a subsidiary of Kmart, acquired Pay n' Save.

By this time, Thrifty's stores were old and in need of updates. New management split the company's sporting brands into a separate operating division. Thrifty also left the Arizona and Nevada markets, closing all its stores in these states in 1992. Within a year, Thrifty had reduced the size of the chain by 20%. By 1993, Thrifty was the sixth-largest drugstore chain in North America with 497 California-based stores.

== History of Thrifty PayLess ==
=== Thrifty PayLess Holdings ===
In December 1993, it was reported that Kmart would sell its 572-store Payless drugstore chain to the owners of Thrifty Drug Stores in exchange for $592 million in cash, $100 million in debt securities, and a 47% stake in TCH Corporation, a new holding company controlled by Leonard Green, composed of Thrifty, Payless, and Bi-Mart. In order to appease regulators, TCH sold several stores in California, Oregon, and Washington and over 200 stores in North Carolina and South Carolina.

The combined company was formed in April 1994 and renamed Thrifty PayLess Holdings, Inc. At the time of the deal, Thrifty operated 495 stores, PayLess operated 543 stores, and Thrifty PayLess ranked second in sales among the nation’s drugstore retailers. Payless closed 40 stores in nine states in 1994. It took Thrifty PayLess 18 months to merge both chain's POS and warehouse management systems.

Tim McAlear of PayLess was chosen as the new company's chief executive and Leonard Green served as chairman. To accommodate McAlear, Thrifty PayLess chose to consolidate its Los Angeles Thrifty headquarters with its PayLess headquarters in Wilsonville, Oregon. However, just seven months later, McAlear was ousted by the board and the chairman of Bi-Mart was hired as chief executive and chairman, with Green stepping down.

In 1995, Thrifty's Ontario, California, distribution center was closed, eliminating over 300 jobs. It also pulled out of Hawaii, divesting 17 stores. By September 1995, Thrifty PayLess completed its departure from LA by donating its former headquarters to the Roman Catholic Archdiocese of Los Angeles. By February 1996, profits had improved, Thrifty PayLess went public, and the company launched Thrifty PayLess Health Services, its pharmacy benefit management division.

=== Sale to Rite Aid ===
In December 1996, Rite Aid acquired 1,000 West Coast stores from Thrifty PayLess Holdings, creating a chain with over 3,500 drug stores. The Thrifty PayLess corporate offices in Wilsonville, Oregon, were closed, and its functions were transferred to Rite Aid headquarters in Camp Hill, Pennsylvania. Leonard Green maintained an 11% share of Rite Aid after the sale and was named chairman in 1999.

The acquisition was not immediately successful for the company. Rite Aid took a charge on the acquisition due to the amount of debt it needed to pay off. It was also slow to update its new West Coast stores and changes it made to advertising and merchandise mix slowed growth. Many of these stores were also twice the size of the typical Rite Aid location, which new leadership had trouble managing. Rite Aid maintained the Thrifty and PayLess stores until 1998, when all locations were converted to the Rite Aid name.

By 1999, Rite Aid was looking to sell off hundreds of its stores located in Washington, Oregon, Idaho, Utah, and Colorado. It sold 38 California stores to Longs Drug Stores. However, Rite Aid fired its chairman and chief executive in October 1999. By January 2000, the company's new management team called off any future plans to sell former Thrifty PayLess.

Thrifty PayLess, Inc., remained an active subsidiary of Rite Aid (owning stores purchased from Thrifty PayLess), as shown in the company's October 2023 Chapter 11 bankruptcy filings.

On May 5, 2025, Rite Aid filed for Chapter 11 bankruptcy for the second time in 2 years, listing assets and liabilities between $1 billion and $10 billion. Rite Aid will sell all of its assets as part of its procedure, as it overcomes financial challenges such as debt, increased competition, and inflation, including Thrifty PayLess.

On June 27, 2025, Rite Aid received court approval to sell its Thrifty Ice Cream subsidiary to Hilrod Holdings for $19.2 million. Hilrod Holdings is managed by Hilton Schlosberg and Rodney Sacks, who are also top executives for Monster Beverage.

== Thrifty Ice Cream ==
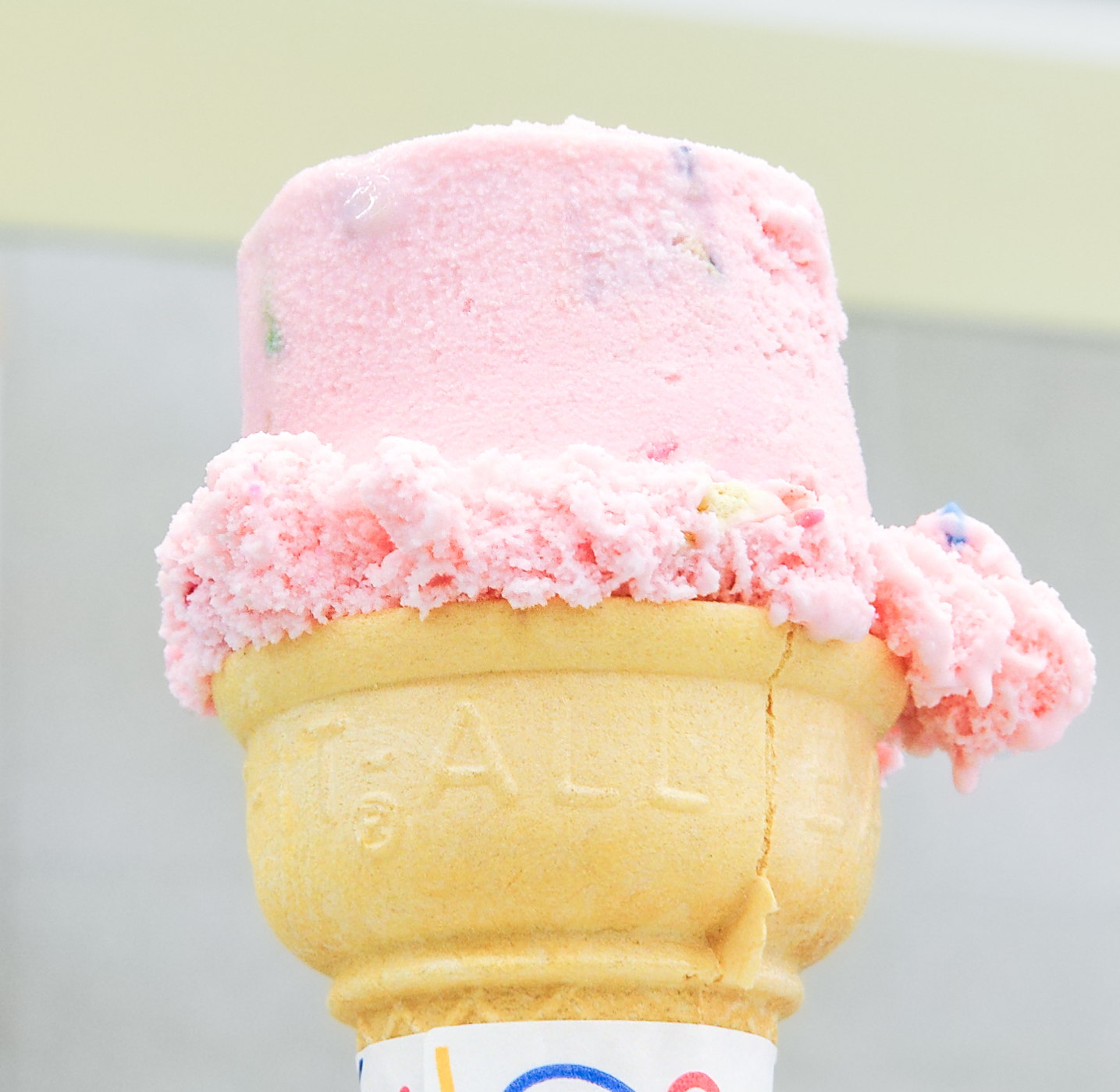
Single scoop of Circus Animal Cookies ice cream on a cake cone, showing the distinctive flat-topped, flat-sided shape of the scoop as typically served at Thrifty Ice Cream dispensaries

Since 1940, Thrifty Drug Stores had manufactured its own brand of ice cream and charged customers an extremely low price for a single scoop of ice cream that was usually eaten inside the store as a loss leader to entice those customers to bring their entire families into the store on a regular basis to eat ice cream that was sold at or below cost while those same customers browse the aisle (while eating) and usually find other items to purchase before leaving the store. The tradition continued on in the former Thrifty Drug Stores after Rite Aid purchased the pharmacy chain in 1996.

== Notes ==
- "Pay Less to jump $1 billion sales hurdle in 1984". Discount Store News. 23. July 23, 1984. Archived from the original on January 29, 2005 – via FindArticles.
- "Pay Less changes mix, closes Wonder World units - Annual Industry Report, part 2". Discount Store News. 27 (15). July 18, 1988.
- "Thrifty PayLess". Drug Store News. 19 (8). April 28, 1997. Archived from the original on June 22, 2008 – via FindArticles.
