= Hy-Vee =

American supermarket chain

Hy-Vee, Inc.

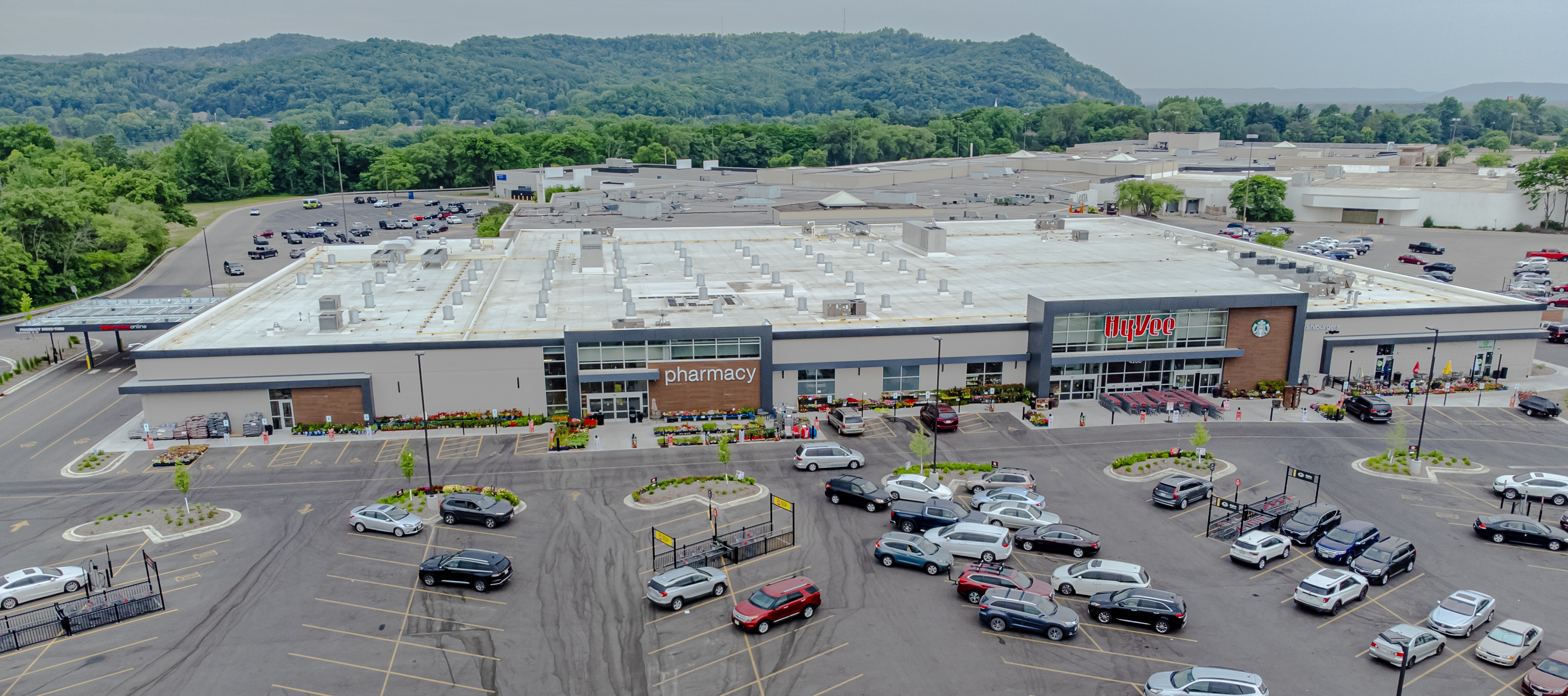
- Hy-Vee in La Crosse, Wisconsin, attached to Valley View Mall
- Type: Private, employee-owned
- Industry: Retail (grocery)
- Founded: 1930; 96 years ago, in Beaconsfield, Iowa
- Founders: Charles Hyde; Dwight Vredenburg
- Headquarters: 5820 Westown Parkway, West Des Moines, Iowa
- Number of locations: 285+ (2022)
- Area served: Midwestern and Southern United States (Note: Stores and a Nashville distribution center are planned for Tennessee, Indiana, Kentucky, and Alabama.)
- Key people: Randy Edeker (chairman); Jeremy Gosch (CEO & vice chairman)
- Products: Bakery, catering, sushi, Asian foods, hibachi, dairy, deli, frozen foods, organic foods, bulk foods, gas, general grocery, meat and seafood, pharmacy, liquor, general merchandise, lawn & garden, floristry
- Services: Starbucks, Market Grille, Market Grille Express, HealthMarket, Health Clinics, gas station/convenience stores, car wash, Hy-Chi, Hy-Vee Drive-In Theatre, Wahlburgers
- Revenue: ▲$12.0 billion (2021)
- Number of employees: 93,000
- Divisions: Hy-Vee Fast & Fresh
- Website: hy-vee.com

Hy-Vee, Inc. (/ˌhaɪˈviː/) is an American employee-owned chain of supermarkets in the midwestern United States, with more than 570 locations in Iowa, Illinois, Kansas, Minnesota, Missouri, Nebraska, South Dakota, and Wisconsin. Hy-Vee also operates in Indiana through its 2024 acquisition of the Strack & Van Til grocery chain. Hy-Vee branded stores have been in the planning stages in Indiana, Kentucky, Tennessee, and Alabama. Hy-Vee was founded in 1930 by Charles Hyde and David Vredenburg in Beaconsfield, Iowa, in a small brick building known as the Beaconsfield Supply Store, which is listed on the National Register of Historic Places.

The largest Hy-Vee stores are full-service supermarkets with bakeries, delicatessens, floral departments, dine-in and carryout food service, wine and spirits, pharmacies, salad bars, health clinics, HealthMarkets (natural and organic products) and coffee kiosks (Caribou Coffee and Starbucks). The company maintains fuel stations with convenience stores, fitness centers, and full-service restaurants at some of its properties, including Wahlburgers, a chain made famous by the same-titled A&E reality series.

Hy-Vee's largest store opened June 13, 2023, in Gretna, Nebraska (near Omaha), with nearly 135,000 square feet (12,500 m^{2}) of retail space. Even larger stores of 150,000 square feet (14,000 m^{2}) were planned for Zionsville, Indiana, and Louisville, Kentucky. The Zionsville store has no set opening date as of October 2026, while the Louisville location expected to open in 2023 was yet to be built as of June 2025.

Hy-Vee's longtime advertising slogan, "Where there's a helpful smile in every aisle", was adopted for the chain's first television commercial in 1963. In the 1990s, the slogan became a jingle with music by Annie Meacham and James Poulsen. Hy-Vee is known as the "Pride of Des Moines".

== History ==
=== Early years and General Supply Company ===
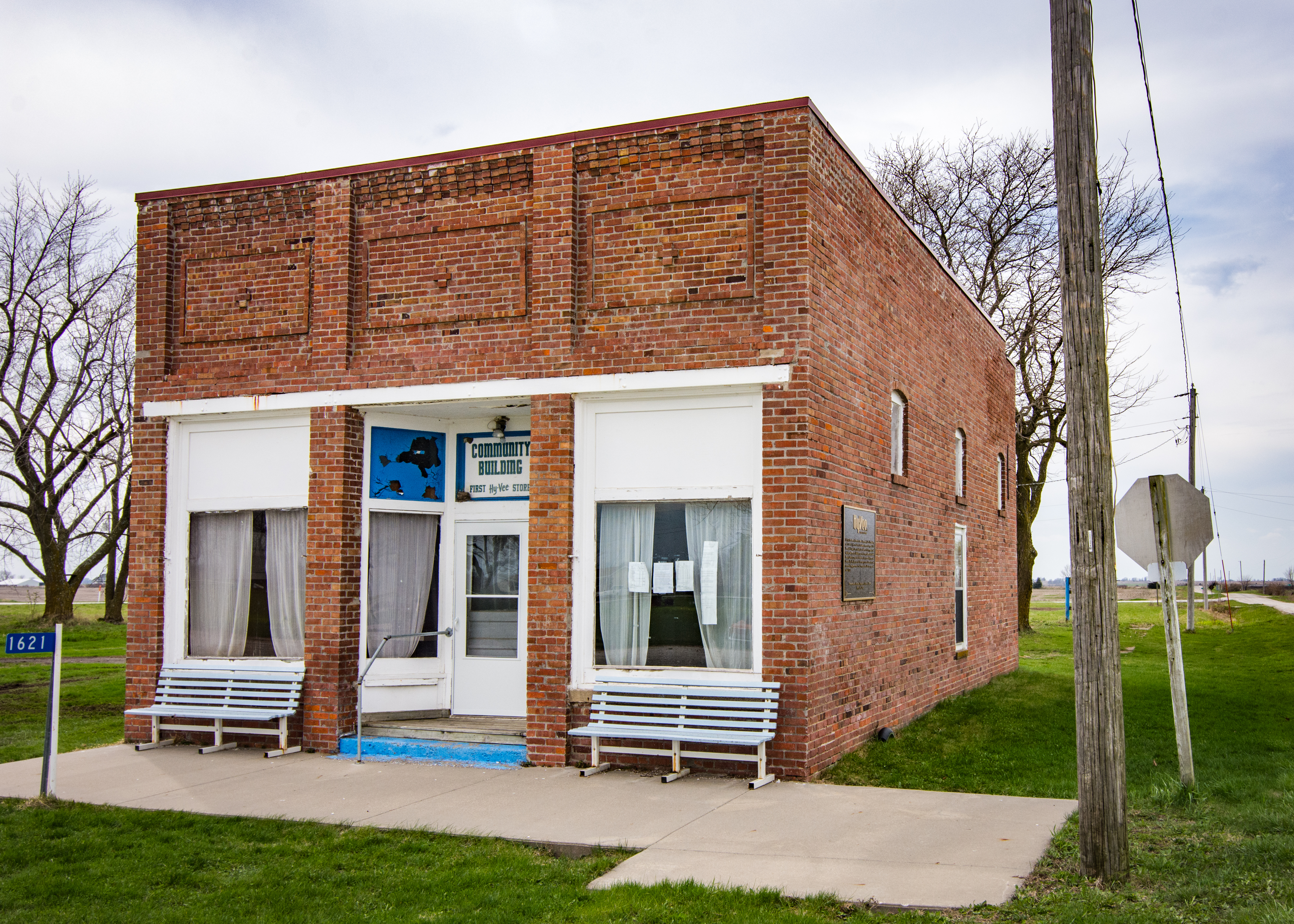
The Beaconsfield, Iowa Supply Store

Starting in 1917, Vredenburg & Lewis, David Vredenburg's previous partnership, operated stores as part of the General Supply Company, an RLDS Church-owned company based in Lamoni, Iowa.

In 1921, Charles Hyde started working for the General Supply Company's store in Woodbine, Iowa, which was operated by Vredenburg & Lewis. In 1922, the General Supply Company was formally incorporated. Vredenburg was president and Hyde was a member of the board of directors. In 1924, Hyde left the General Supply Company and started his store in Cameron, Missouri.

In 1927, Hyde purchased a half stake of a store in Kellerton, Iowa, the other half being owned by the General Supply Company. In 1930, Vredenburg and Hyde started a separate partnership from the General Supply Company, named Supply Stores, and opened their first store in Beaconsfield, Iowa.

In 1932, The General Supply Company was dissolved because of the effects of the Great Depression. Vredenburg purchased most of the former General Supply Company's remaining stores and mill. Both Hyde and Vredenburg owned and operated other stores outside of their partnership. Hyde and Vredenburg's partnership was dissolved for approximately six months in 1935 after Iowa enacted the Chain Tax Act of 1935, a heavy tax against chain stores that was later declared unconstitutional.

In 1938, Hyde & Vredenburg, Inc. was officially incorporated, with 15 stores in Iowa and Missouri. The incorporation consolidated all of Hyde's and Vredenburg's independently owned stores with the stores they had in their partnership. The company was headquartered in Lamoni. The new company's management plan involved autonomy for store managers, setting the stage for eventual employee ownership.

In 1945, Hyde & Vredenburg moved its corporate headquarters from Lamoni to Chariton, Iowa, after acquiring the Chariton Wholesale Company.

The Supply Store name, with each town's name preceding it, was still used on most stores until 1952. A few stores were named differently, such as Hyde's Service Store, Vredenburg's Grocery, and Hyde & Vredenburg, all changed in 1952.

=== 1950s and 1960s ===
The Hy-Vee name, a portmanteau of Hyde and Vredenburg, was adopted in 1952 as the winning entry of an employee contest, with three employees submitting the name. The first store with the name opened in Fairfield, Iowa, in 1953. In 1956, Hy-Vee introduced its first private-label products and a new logo. In 1957, Hy-Vee opened its first in-store bakery at the Iowa City, Iowa, store.

In 1960, the company became employee-owned by the Employees' Trust Fund. The slogan "Where There's a Helpful Smile in Every Aisle" was first used in a TV commercial in 1963. The company's name was officially changed to Hy-Vee Food Stores, Inc., in 1963.

In 1969, Hy-Vee expanded into Minnesota after acquiring the Swanson Stores chain based in Cherokee, Iowa. In 1969, Hy-Vee opened its first Drug Town, a pharmacy separate from a regular store, in Cedar Rapids, Iowa. At the end of 1969, Hy-Vee had 66 stores.

=== 1970s, 1980s, and 1990s ===
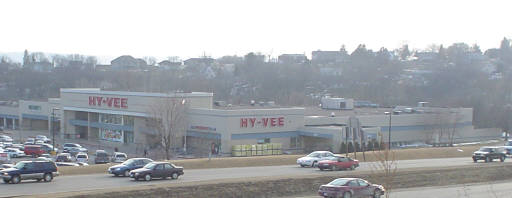
A Hy-Vee Store in Dubuque, Iowa, in February 2005, in a former Randall's Foods. This was remodeled and expanded in 2013.

Hy-Vee continued expanding during the 1970s and 1980s, opening stores in South Dakota (1975), Nebraska (1977), Illinois (1979), and Kansas (1988). In 1975, Hy-Vee's 100th store, which was also its first to use electronic cash registers, opened in Keokuk, Iowa. By the end of 1989, Hy-Vee had 172 stores in seven states. In 1994, Hy-Vee updated its logo.

In 1995, Hy-Vee moved its corporate headquarters from Chariton to West Des Moines, Iowa, and shortened its name to Hy-Vee, Inc. The company's primary distribution center is still in Chariton; a second one is in Cherokee, Iowa.

NFL quarterback Kurt Warner worked at a store in Cedar Falls, Iowa, from 1994 to 1995, before going to play arena football for the Iowa Barnstormers.

=== 2000s ===
At the turn of the millennium, Hy-Vee increased its focus on customers' healthy lifestyles. HealthMarket private-label products were introduced in 2001. The company also began an initiative to provide customers with the services of corporate and in-store dietitians.

Stores began offering an expanded line of ethnic foods to the Midwest's increasingly diverse population. Online shopping capabilities expanded in 2005, with a redesigned Hy-Vee website offering online shopping for such items as holiday meals, floral arrangements, and catering selections; gift cards were added in 2006.

Hy-Vee was selected as Progressive Grocer's Retailer of the Year in 2003. Drug Town stores were renamed Hy-Vee Drugstores in 2005. Hy-Vee celebrated its 75th anniversary in 2005 with the publication of a second company history book (The History of Hy-Vee). In 2007, Hy-Vee's first store, in Beaconsfield, Iowa, was placed on the National Register of Historic Places.

In the fiscal year 2009, Hy-Vee sales exceeded $6.3 billion; at the time, it was the second-largest employee-owned company in the United States and ranked by Forbes magazine the 48th-largest privately owned company in the country. More than 55,000 employees worked in the Hy-Vee family in 2009.

By the end of 2009, there were 228 stores. In 2009, Hy-Vee moved into its eighth state of operations when the store in Madison, Wisconsin, opened. In December 2009, Hy-Vee's fourth president, Randy Edeker, was selected to lead the company. Ric Jurgens retained the chairman and chief executive officer titles until 2012, when Edeker assumed those roles.

In 2003, Milan, Illinois–based grocer Eagle Food Centers went out of business, and a few of their stores, such as the John Deere Road store in Moline, Illinois, became Hy-Vee stores in the late 2000s.

=== 2010s ===
In 2010, Hy-Vee expressed interest in building/opening a store in Joplin, Missouri, but the plans fell through when the developer would not negotiate traffic signal installation. Despite this, they retained interest in the area, but according to a Facebook reply in 2016, they have yet to make plans for the Joplin area.

In 2012, Hy-Vee introduced its loyalty program, Hy-Vee Fuel Saver, which allows customers to earn discounts on fuel at Casey's General Stores; Shell; PDQ/Kwik Trip, as well as Hy-Vee's own gas stations, by purchasing select items. Later that year, Hy-Vee began adding full-service restaurants to some stores, such as the Hy-Vee Market Grille.

In 2015, Hy-Vee brought online shopping to all stores with the introduction of its new website, Hy-Vee Aisles Online. The company's loyalty program adopted Hy-Vee Fuel Saver + Perks branding.

In September 2015, Hy-Vee opened its first stores in the Minneapolis–Saint Paul metropolitan area.

In 2016, Hy-Vee began opening clothing boutiques featuring Tesco's F&F brand in select larger locations.

In 2017, Hy-Vee became the exclusive retailer in its service area for sports nutrition products marketed by Mark Wahlberg. This expanded into a deal-making Hy-Vee a franchisee for Wahlburgers restaurants; the first location under the deal opened in May 2018 at the Mall of America in Bloomington, Minnesota. In 2025, Hy-Vee announced the end of its partnership with Wahlburgers, converting all locations into Market Grille.

Hy-Vee opened its first standalone HealthMarket store in 2018. Much like the in-store health department, also named HealthMarket, the standalone store focuses on health and wellness. The store is a smaller format than regular Hy-Vee stores and contains a pharmacy and attached Orangetheory Fitness.

In 2018, the first Hy-Vee Dollar Fresh store opened up in Osceola, Iowa. The concept is designed and marketed to offer customers in smaller communities a budget-friendly selection of grocery items, and includes a bakery section, a dollar section, a Wall of Value, ready-to-eat meal offerings, and other services.

In 2018, the first Hy-Vee Fast & Fresh convenience store opened in Davenport, Iowa. It offered standard pantry and frozen grocery items alongside fresh produce, dairy, meat, and bakery departments. It also had a gas station, online pickup, wood-oven pizzas, sushi, a craft beer station, wine and spirits section, made-to-order meals, take-and-heat meals, meal kits, and a Starbucks with a drive-thru. Unlike other Hy-Vee locations, the convenience store was not open 24/7; in some markets, Hy-Vee Fast & Fresh was meant to compete with Walmart Neighborhood Market, a similar small-store concept launched in 1998.

In 2019, Hy-Vee announced it would open Joe Fresh clothing sections in stores and replace its existing F&F clothing departments.

=== 2020s ===
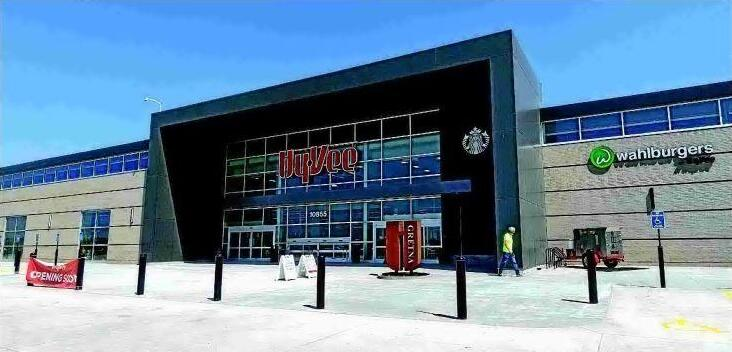
The largest Hy-Vee store, in Gretna, Nebraska, opened on June 13, 2023.

On January 27, 2020, Hy-Vee agreed to acquire six former Shopko locations in Iowa that will re-open under the Dollar Fresh brand by late summer.

On February 10, 2020, Hy-Vee grocery stores ended 24-hour service at most locations. Most of the 24-hour stores closed between midnight and 5 a.m., though hours varied by location. The stores still had stock crews working overnight, but the stores are not open to the public.

On February 19, 2020, Hy-Vee acquired four QuikTrip convenience store locations in the Des Moines metro that re-opened under the Hy-Vee Fast & Fresh Express brand on March 20, 2020.

In August 2021, Hy-Vee announced a new standalone liquor store named Wall to Wall Wine and Spirits, with plans to open four stores in West Des Moines, Iowa, Papillion, Nebraska, Omaha, Nebraska, and Lincoln, Nebraska.

In September 2021, Hy-Vee opened a 92,989-square-foot flagship store in Grimes, Iowa. The "smart store" contained new technology for Hy-Vee, including scan-and-go shopping, salad-making robot vending machines, digital shelf labels, and self-serve kiosks that allow customers to order bakery items, hot food, or fitness equipment. The store also had experimental ideas including a cigar room, a new design for the hot food area inspired by food halls, fitness equipment from Johnson Fitness & Wellness, redesigned wine and spirits section, DSW shoe department, and nail salon named The W Nail Bar. The same month the chain opened a similar store in Eau Claire, Wisconsin. This location was the first in the state outside of the Madison area.

In November 2021, Hy-Vee received several awards from the Technology Association of Iowa at their annual Prometheus Awards ceremony. Hy-Vee won the awards: CEO of the Year, Creative Technology Solution of the Year, and Software Development Technology Company of the Year.

In December 2021, Hy-Vee expressed interest in a former Shopko location in Ashwaubenon, Wisconsin, by applying for liquor licenses. The nearly 125,000-square-foot store opened on November 8, 2022, becoming the largest in the chain by square footage. It was the fourth location in Wisconsin.

In December 2021, Hy-Vee launched a new subsidiary, RedBox Rx, which provides telehealth online pharmacy services and home prescription delivery.

In December 2021, Hy-Vee announced the closure of four locations. Two of them, one in Cedar Rapids, Iowa, and one in Moline, Illinois (acquired in the 2000s as part of the Eagle Food Center bankruptcy), were to be closed permanently. A store in Kansas City, Missouri, will be converted into a Wall to Wall Wine and Spirits location, and another in Sioux Falls, South Dakota, will be renovated into a non-retail bakery and pharmacy fulfillment location.

In December 2021, Hy-Vee announced plans to expand into four new states, with plans to open at least 21 new stores by 2025 with seven of the 21 to open no later than 2023, in the following markets: Indianapolis, Louisville, Kentucky, Huntsville, Alabama, Knoxville, Tennessee, Nashville, Tennessee, and Memphis, Tennessee. Their primary competitors in the South will be Cincinnati, Ohio–based Kroger and Lakeland, Florida–based Publix. Hy-Vee said it had no plans to open stores within H-E-B's trade territory of Texas. Hy-Vee plans to build a third distribution center, in Nashville, their first outside of Iowa, which will service the seven new stores and southern Missouri. Hy-Vee had originally planned to build its third distribution center in Austin, Minnesota, but put those plans on hold indefinitely.

In December 2021, Hy-Vee expanded its online offering by introducing home delivery. Customers are able to purchase bulk grocery items directly from the Hy-Vee Deals website, and a pet specific website (Petship) was also launched.

In February 2022, Hy-Vee opened its second Springfield, Missouri, store.

In March 2022, Hy-Vee announced a new location in Spring Hill, Tennessee, its first location in the state.

On July 27, 2022, the company announced that Randy Edeker would step down from his position as CEO, and Aaron Wiese would assume the CEO role. Randy Edeker remained chairman of the board.

On April 17, 2024, Hy-Vee announced the acquisition of 22 Strack & Van Til stores in northwest Indiana. The acquisition included the one Town & Country location under Strack & Van Til ownership. The price was not revealed, but spokesperson Tina Potthoff said the purchase was one of the largest in Hy-Vee's history. Strack & Van Til will become a wholly-owned subsidiary of Hy-Vee but will retain its logos, name, and branding.

Having previously announced locations in Zionsville and Fishers for Indiana expansion, Hy-Vee said those timelines may shift, but are still in the plans for expansion. "We plan to continue to build in these areas," Potthoff said. "Due to this acquisition, we are reviewing and finalizing our construction timeline for those locations."

In September 2025, it was reported that Hy-Vee had discontinued plans for a store in Stillwater. Minnesota.

=== Information and statistics ===
Hy-Vee is known to move departments into separate buildings for legal requirements or optimal customer service. This is commonly seen in the construction of a separate building for Hy-Vee Gas, usually near the main store. It is also common for Hy-Vee to have attached liquor stores, as in Minnesota, where grocery stores are not allowed to sell alcoholic beverages over 3.2% alcohol by weight. In some cases, there is a completely separate building for the liquor department, such as the Prairie Village, Kansas store, where the liquor store is across the street (State Line Road) in Kansas City, Missouri, and thus operates under Missouri's more liberal alcohol laws.

Hy-Vee ranked second on the National Center for Employee Ownership's list of Largest Employee Owned Companies in 2011. Hy-Vee ranked 27th on Forbes magazine's annual list of the largest privately owned companies in the United States in 2017. Hy-Vee ranked 27th on "Top 75 North American Food Retailers" by Supermarket News in 2016. Hy-Vee ranked 4th on America's Favorite Grocery Retailers by Market Force Information in 2016.

Hy-Vee won numerous awards in 2017, including recognition by Forbes as one of America's Best Employers. Forbes named Hy-Vee as one of the top 50 private companies in the United States. Hy-Vee was ranked as the sixth favorite Grocery Retailer in America by Market Force in 2017. Progressive Grocer selected Hy-Vee as its Retailer of the Year in 2017, while Mass Market Retailers appointed Hy-Vee as the 2017 Retail Innovator of the Year.

In 2021, Hy-Vee was ranked by Forbes magazine as the 24th largest privately owned company in the United States.

As of 2021, Hy-Vee Inc. had more than 91,000 employees and 285 retail stores. It had annual sales of more than $12 billion.

=== Presidents and CEOs ===
Hy-Vee has had five company presidents and four CEOs in its 91-year history:

Presidents and CEOs of Hy-Vee, Inc.
No.	Name	Tenure		
No.	Name	President	CEO	Board Chair
1	Dwight Vredenburg	1938–1983	1978–1989	1978–1989
2	Ron Pearson	1983–2001	1989–2003	1989–2006
3	Ric Jurgens	2001–2009	2003–2012	2006–2012
4	Randy Edeker	2009–2021	2012–2023 (Note: The CEO position was shared by Randy Edeker and Jeremy Gosch from 2021 to 2023.)	2012–2024
5	Jeremy Gosch	-	2021–present	2024–present
6	Aaron Wiese	2022-present	-	-

== Sponsorships ==
Hy-Vee has been a major sponsor of road racing—especially women's half marathons. The company sponsors a series of half marathons for women, which takes place in the cities of Kansas City, Omaha, Des Moines, and St. Paul.

Hy-Vee previously served as the title or presenting sponsor for multiple later-defunct sporting events that included the Hy-Vee Classic, a Women's Senior Tour event from 2000–2006, and the Hy-Vee Triathlon, an Olympic-distance triathlon from 2007–2014.

In the Des Moines area, Hy-Vee sponsors the 80/35 Music Festival as the Main Stage sponsor since 2015. They sponsor the Des Moines Arts Festival and the Iowa State Fair.

=== College sports ===
The Iowa–Nebraska football rivalry is officially branded as the Hy-Vee Heroes Game (2011–present). Hy-Vee also is a sponsor for over 38 colleges and universities over its eight-state region. Hy-Vee also sponsored the Hy-Vee Classic, an annual doubleheader in Des Moines, Iowa, involving Iowa's four Division I men's basketball teams - Iowa, Iowa State, Drake, and Northern Iowa. Hy-Vee previously served as the sponsor for the Drake Relays, an athletics event held at Drake University in Des Moines, Iowa, from 2013 to 2019.

=== Motorsports ===
==== IndyCar ====
In 2020, Hy-Vee began sponsoring a car for the Rahal Letterman Lanigan Racing Team in the IndyCar Series for Graham Rahal at the race at Iowa Speedway and Spencer Pigot at that year's Indianapolis 500. In 2021 Hy-Vee sponsored Santino Ferrucci for five races including the Indianapolis 500 and Oliver Askew for three race in the No. 45. Hy-Vee was also the sponsor of the No. 45 driven by Jack Harvey and a prominent associate sponsor for teammates Graham Rahal and Christian Lundgaard in the No. 15 and 30 cars respectively. In 2025, it was announced that Hy-Vee wouldn't sponsor RLL nor serve as the title sponsor of the Iowa and Milwaukee races.

==== NASCAR ====
In 2024, when NASCAR returned to Iowa Speedway, Hy-Vee currently sponsors the Hy-Vee PERKS 250, a race in the NASCAR Xfinity Series.

=== Professional sports ===
Hy-Vee served as a sponsor of Major League Baseball's Kansas City Royals from 2001 to 2016. In 2009, Hy-Vee replaced Price Chopper as the official grocery store of the NFL's Kansas City Chiefs. In July 2015, Hy-Vee was named the NHL's Minnesota Wild official grocery, pharmacy, and floral partner. Hy-Vee was named a founding partner for U.S. Bank Stadium and an official partner of the NFL's Minnesota Vikings in August 2015. This partnership includes prominent signage in the new stadium. In October 2017, Hy-Vee was named the official grocery, pharmacy, and floral partner of the NBA's Minnesota Timberwolves, WNBA's Minnesota Lynx, and the G-league's Iowa Wolves.

=== Venues ===
Hy-Vee purchased the naming rights to the Iowa Events Center's exhibition hall, named Hy-Vee Hall in 2001; the venue was completed in December 2004.

On May 17, 2018, The Kansas City Star reported that Hy-Vee purchased the naming rights to Kemper Arena in Kansas City, Missouri. The renovated Hy-Vee Arena has been converted into an adult and youth sports facility.

== Subsidiaries ==
Throughout its history, Hy-Vee has vertically integrated its retail operations by acquiring several companies that provide services to its stores. Hy-Vee's subsidiaries are:

- Midwest Heritage Bank, FSB, with branch locations and offices in Iowa
  - Purchased the National Bank & Trust Company of Chariton in 1963. The name was changed to Midwest Heritage Bank in 1995.
  - Midwest Heritage Bank is one of the only non-Industrial Loan Company banks in the U.S. to be owned by a retailer. It is an OCC Regulated Federal Savings Association (SA), also known as a Federal Savings Bank.
- Lomar Distributing, Inc., a specialty food distributor based in Des Moines
  - Acquired in 1990
- Perishable Distributors of Iowa, Ltd., a distributor of meat, seafood, cheese and dairy items based in Ankeny, Iowa
  - Became an affiliate in 1982 and a subsidiary of Hy-Vee in 1990
- D & D Foods, Inc., a supplier of freshly prepared salads, dips, meat, and entree items based in Omaha, Nebraska
  - Originally named D & D Salads, Inc., this subsidiary was purchased in 1992
- Florist Distributing, Inc., a distributor of flowers and plants based in Des Moines, Iowa
  - Became a subsidiary in 1992
- Hy-Vee Construction, L.C., a construction company based in Des Moines
  - Originally formed as a joint partnership with Weitz Construction in 1995 named Hy-Vee/Weitz Construction L.C., Hy-Vee purchased Weitz's remaining share of the company in 2013, officially forming a subsidiary.
- A+ Communications
  - Surveillance, Security Systems, and Home Audio
- Amber Pharmacy
  - Hy-Vee Pharmacy Solutions and Amber Pharmacy began a partnership in 2009. Amber Pharmacy was fully purchased in 2014.
- Vivid Clear Rx
  - Became a subsidiary in 2020
- Wall to Wall Wine and Spirits
  - Became a subsidiary in 2021
- Dollar Fresh Market
- Strack & Van Til was acquired in full in 2024.
