= EMC Expo Center =

Convention center in Des Moines, Iowa

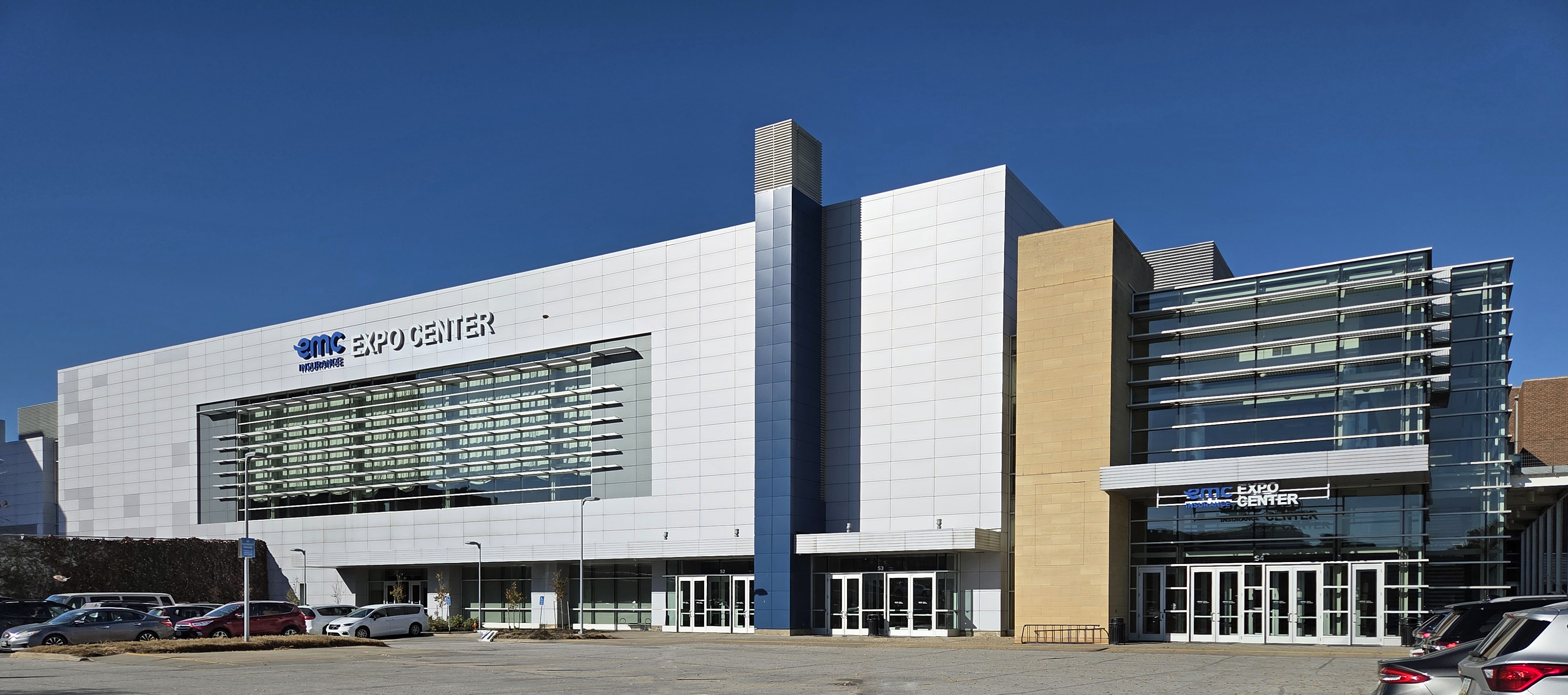
- EMC Expo Center viewed from the south-southeast
- Interactive map of EMC Expo Center
- Address: 730 3rd Street
- Location: Des Moines, Iowa
- Coordinates: 41°35′30″N 93°37′21″W
- Owner: Polk County
- Operator: Spectra Venue Management
- Capacity: 17,000
- Public transit: DART

Construction
- Built: 2002–2004
- Opened: 2004

Website
- iowaeventscenter.com

EMC Expo Center is a convention center in Des Moines, Iowa, United States. The convention center is a part of the Iowa Events Center.

== History ==
=== Hy-Vee Hall (2004–2024) ===
Locally-based Midwest grocer chain Hy-Vee acquired the naming rights in a 20-year deal finalized in 2001.

While still incomplete, Hy-Vee Hall hosted its first event, the Autumn Festival, from October 21 through October 23, 2004. It was formally dedicated on December 15, 2004, while the Iowa Hall of Pride opened to the public on February 23, 2005.

=== EMC Expo Center (2025–) ===
On November 18, 2024, the Polk County Board of Supervisors announced that Hy-Vee had opted not to renew the naming rights agreement and that local insurance provider EMC Insurance had been awarded the naming rights. The Board of Supervisors will vote on the name change on November 19, 2024, and the venue will officially be renamed the "EMC Expo Center" on January 1, 2025. The new naming rights agreement will last 10 years.

== Convention hall ==
The convention center features 100,000 square feet (9,000 m^{2}) of space for trade shows, conventions, and other major events; with the connected Community Choice Credit Union Convention Center, the Hall offers 150,000 square feet of continuous space. It also features eight meeting rooms with a total of 15,000 square feet (1,400 m^{2}) of meeting space. The south end of Hy-Vee Hall houses the Iowa Hall of Pride, which honors the achievements of Iowa high school athletes and performers. Hy-Vee Hall is considered "Iowa's largest ballroom" with a capacity of up to 17,000.

== Notable events ==
In 2008, Hy-Vee Hall hosted then-Senator Barack Obama's victory speech following the Iowa caucuses.
