= Beaconsfield Supply Store =

Historic store in Iowa, United States

- U.S. National Register of Historic Places
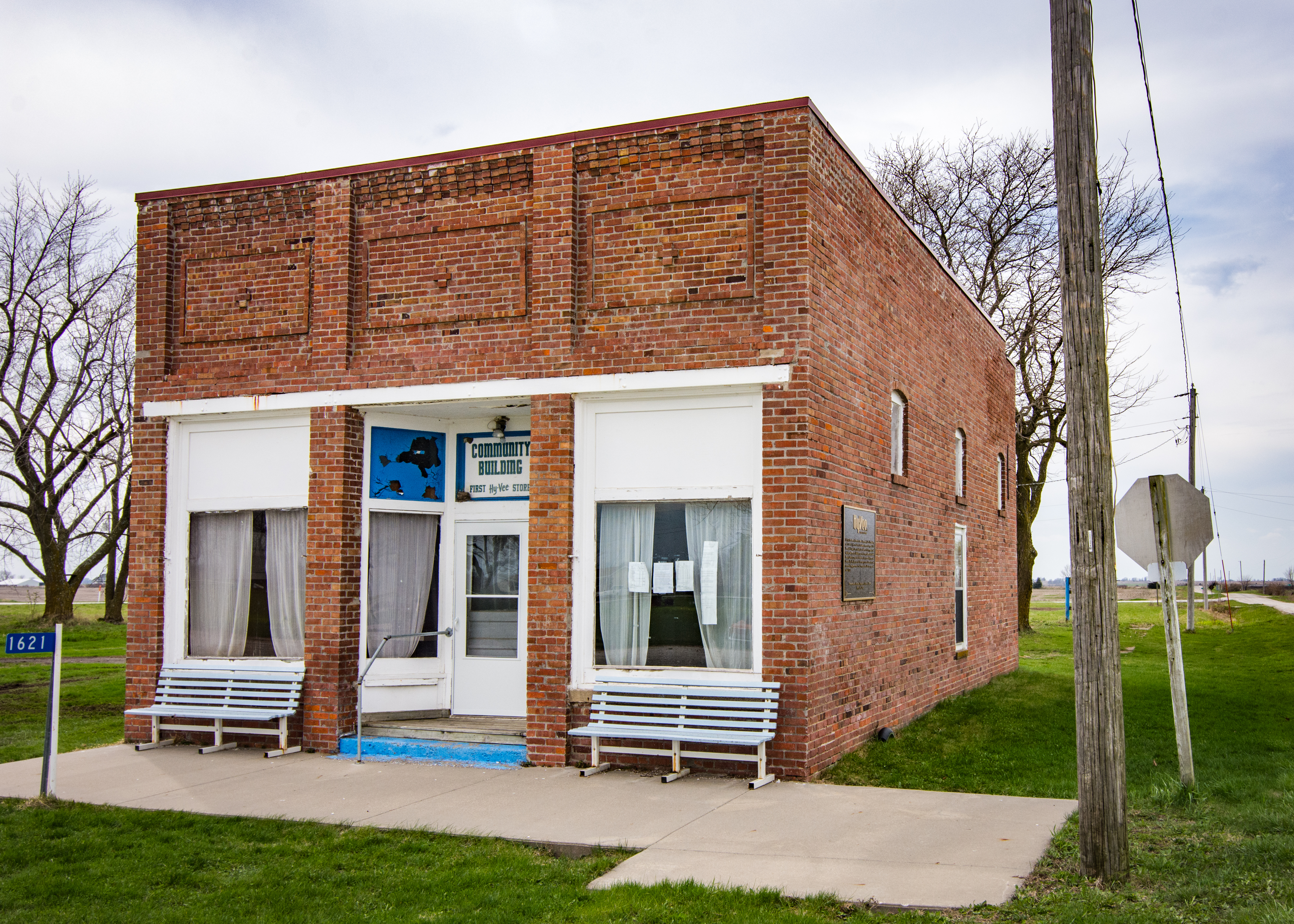
- The now community building is one of the few buildings in Beaconsfield.

- Location within Iowa Location within the United States
- Location: Beaconsfield, Iowa
- Coordinates: 40°48′27″N 94°03′01″W
- Built: 1916
- NRHP reference No.: 07000451
- Added to NRHP: May 24, 2007

The Beaconsfield Supply Store, also known as the Beaconsfield Community Building, is a one-story brick building in the small city of Beaconsfield in rural Ringgold County, Iowa, United States. Built in 1916, it became the birthplace of the Hy-Vee chain of stores when Charles Hyde and David Vredenburg opened a general store together in 1930. The building was later used for a variety of purposes, including a telephone exchange. It was added to the National Register of Historic Places in 2007.

The building serves as the community center for Beaconsfield, which, with 15 residents as of 2021, has been described as the second smallest incorporated city in Iowa.

== History ==
In late 1929, the founders of Hy-Vee paid $3,000 to buy the building, which had previously housed a dry goods store that failed during the stock market crash. It served as a retail store until 1956, when a local phone company took ownership.

In 2021, the building was named one of the most endangered historic sites in Iowa. The small local community is working to preserve and restore it, with the possibility of making it a museum.
