= Charles Crouch =

American businessman (1898–1957)

Charles Lanham Crouch (September 15, 1898 – December 11, 1957) was an American merchandising executive best known as a cofounder of the supermarket chain that became Lucky Stores.

== Early life ==
Charles Crouch was born in Augusta, Georgia, September 15, 1898, to Lily (née Strom) and Joseph William Crouch.

== Career ==
In 1932, Crouch and four partners purchased six of the former Clarence Saunders Piggly Wiggly stores in the San Francisco peninsula area and founded Peninsula Stores, Ltd., in 1935, it became Lucky Stores, the first Lucky Store at Shattuck and Bancroft in Berkeley. In November 1937, Crouch was a General Manager. When he retired from the presidency of Lucky Stores in 1947 there were thirty-three stores in the chain with an annual gross of $30,000,000. At the openings of his various stores Crouch used such devices as simulated carnivals, also hiring popular jazz bands to attract customers. He engaged Raymond Loewy Associates of New York City to design what was considered to be a new type of supermarket, employing color psychology to attract customers and providing each customer with a lightweight aluminum shopping cart on which was mounted a printed directory to all merchandise in the store. In 1949 Crouch was named man of the year in the merchandising field by Operations, Inc., a national research and sales organization serving large chain stores, manufacturers, and wholesale grocers. Charles Crouch was a west coast developer of the modern supermarket.

In 1950, with N. Clark Earl Jr., Crouch bought control of the Childs Company of New York, then operating its chain of fifty-three restaurants. He became executive vice-president of the company at the time of the purchase and shortly thereafter was made president. Two months after purchasing Childs, the new owners also bought 90 percent of the stock in Louis Sherry Inc., New York, makers of fine candy and ice cream. Crouch became president of the company upon the purchase.

== Personal life ==
On May 18, 1921, in Vicksburg, Mississippi, Charles Crouch married Nancy Carol Brabston, daughter of a prominent Mississippi planter and direct descendant of the Earl of Arundel, the Duke of Norfolk, and King Edward I of England. They had one son, Charles Lanham Crouch Jr.

Throughout his life, Charles Crouch was an avid horseman and polo player.

Charles Crouch died in San Francisco on December 11, 1957.

== Sources ==
- The National Cyclopaedia of American Biography
