= Lucky Stores =

Two distinct American supermarket chains

- Lucky and Lucky California logo used by the Save Mart-owned stores but not the Albertson-owned stores which uses inverse colors
- Type: Subsidiary
- Industry: Retail (Grocery)
- Founded: 1935 (91 years ago) as Peninsula Stores Limited in San Leandro, California, U.S.
- Founder: Charles Crouch
- Headquarters: Modesto, California, U.S. (Save Mart); Boise, Idaho (Albertsons)
- Number of locations: 66 (Save Mart in California); 4 (Albertsons in Utah)
- Areas served: California (Save Mart); Utah (Albertsons)
- Products: Bakery, dairy, deli, frozen foods, general grocery, meat, pharmacy, produce, seafood, snacks, liquor
- Owner: The Save Mart Companies (under license from Albertsons); Albertsons
- Parent: American Stores Company (1988–1998); Albertsons (2006–present); The Save Mart Companies (2006–present); Jim Pattison Group (2024-present)
- Website: www.luckysupermarkets.com (Save Mart) www.luckylowprices.com (Albertsons)

Lucky Stores are a pair of American supermarket chains plus a defunct historical chain. The original chain was founded in San Leandro, California and operated from 1935 until 1999. The Lucky brand was revived circa 2007 and is now operated as two distinct chains: Albertsons operates Lucky in Utah and Save Mart Supermarkets operates Lucky California in Northern California.

In 1998, American Stores, the corporate parent of the original Lucky chain, was taken over by Albertsons, and by 1999 the Lucky brand had been retired.

In January 2006, SuperValu, CVS Pharmacy and an investment group led by Cerberus Capital Management announced they had agreed to acquire Albertsons for $17.4 billion. Existing Albertsons stores were divided between Supervalu and the Cerberus-led group. The Cerberus-acquired stores became Albertsons, which then sold its northern California and northern Nevada stores to Save Mart Supermarkets. The complex deal was not finalized until June 2006.

Around the time that the acquisition was occurring, Grocery Outlet decided to rebrand one of its stores with the Lucky brand and filed a lawsuit in federal court against Albertsons claiming that Albertsons had previously abandoned the trademark in 1999. The rebranded store opened on April 1, 2006. Albertsons filed a counter suit to prevent Grocery Outlet from opening additional stores and for Grocery Outlet to remove signage from its existing Lucky-branded store. On January 4, 2009, a federal judge ruled against Grocery Outlet, finding that Albertsons had continued to use the name Lucky even after the re-branding of its stores.

To strengthen its claim to the Lucky trademark, Albertsons, through its legal successor Supervalu, opened three Lucky-branded stores in Southern California in July 2006. As part of the sale of its Northern California Albertsons division to Save Mart in November 2006, Albertsons gave Save Mart the right to use the Lucky brand in any location in which it had the right to use the Albertsons name, namely Northern California. Save Mart did not begin conversion of some of its Albertsons stores to the Lucky brand until July 2007. Ultimately, the courts ruled in favor of Albertsons by January 2009.

Albertsons' attempt to maintain Lucky-branded stores in the competitive Southern California and Las Vegas marketplaces eventually failed while the four Lucky branded stores in and near Salt Lake City in Utah still survive.

Save Mart changed most of its Albertsons stores in the San Francisco Bay Area to the Lucky California brand, most of which still survive.

== History of original chain ==
=== Supermarket operations ===
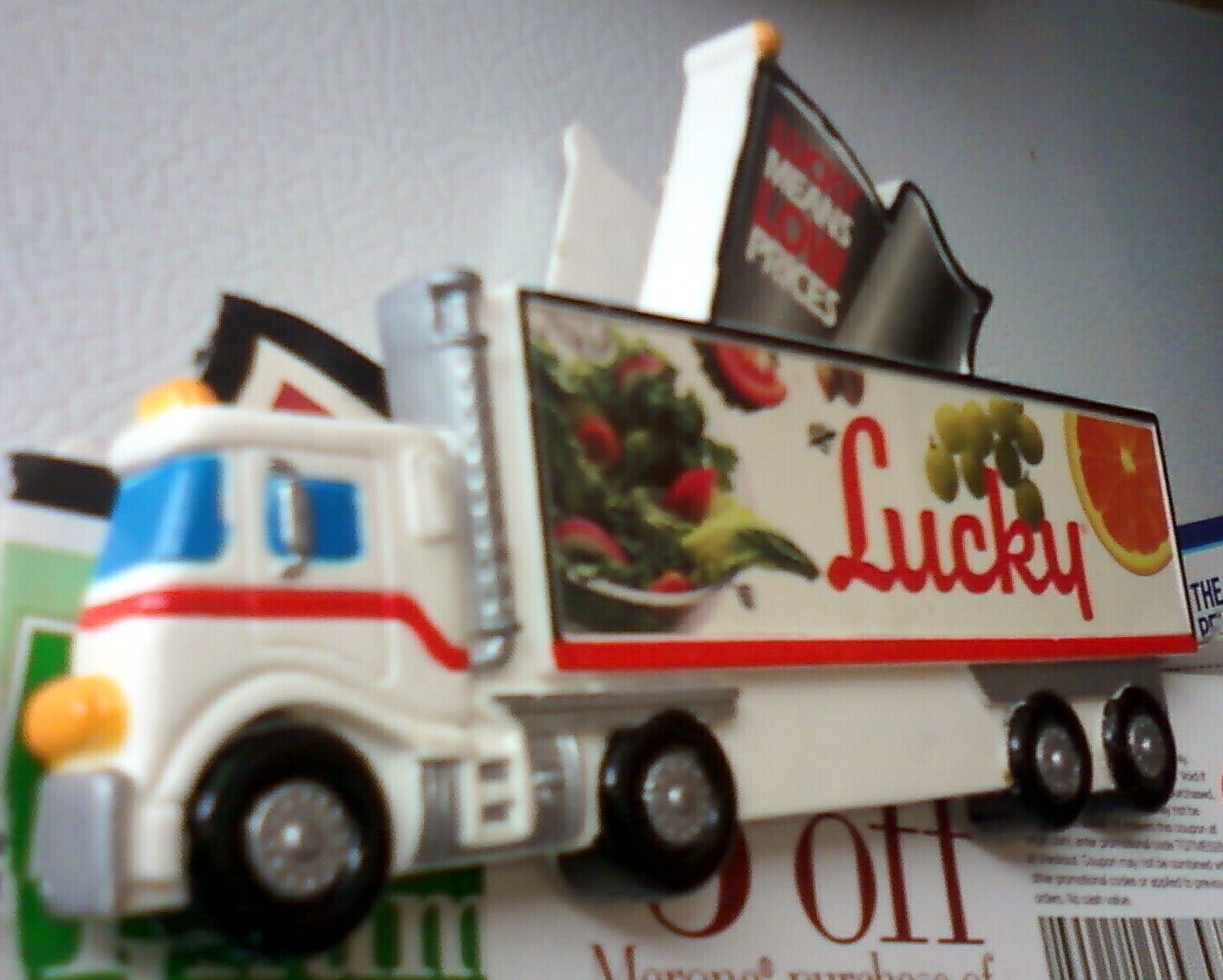
An original Lucky refrigerator magnet bearing its trademark "Lucky means low prices" slogan

Lucky Stores was founded by Charles Crouch as Peninsula Stores Limited in 1931 with the acquisition of Piggly Wiggly stores in Burlingame, San Mateo, Redwood City, Palo Alto, and San Jose. By 1935, seven more stores had been added, including the company's first stores in the East Bay, in Berkeley, and in Oakland. In 1947, the company's first flagship store opened in San Leandro, California.

Lucky grew by acquisition in many markets. It expanded into Southern California in 1956 when it bought 10 Jim Dandy stores in Los Angeles and six Food Basket supermarkets in San Diego. The same year, the company bought 32 Cardinal stores around Sacramento. It purchased nine Big Bear Stores operating in Seattle and Tacoma in 1958 and six Hiram's stores operating in the Los Angeles area in 1959.

In 1967, Lucky acquired Eagle Food Centers to expand into the Midwest. The acquisition included 90 Eagle and Piggy Wiggy stores, 30 May's Drug Stores, 4 Times Photo & Supply Stores, and the Coin Baking Company. It acquired the Florida-based Kash n' Karry chain in 1979 and the 11-store Dale's chain based in Los Angeles in 1984. Many chains were operated under their old names for several years after their takeovers.

Lucky stores in the Seattle market were sold to Associated Grocers in October 1985. Lucky lacked a distribution center in the state of Washington and felt that it was impractical to continue to serve the market from distribution and manufacturing facilities in California. Associated Grocers renamed the stores from their co-op owned stores and other independent markets.

Lucky Stores operated 22 Houston-area Eagle Supermarkets until March 1985, when it decided to exit the market altogether. Twenty stores were sold to competitors and two were closed.

=== Diversified subsidiaries ===
Gemco, Lucky's membership department store from 1962 to 1986

In 1962, Lucky acquired Gemco discount stores, which had been established in the Anaheim area in 1959. The membership discount chain operated in California, Nevada, Arizona, and Houston. Memco, a similar store, operated in the Chicago, Washington, D.C., and Houston areas. In October 1971, Lucky Stores acquired Kragen Auto Supply in a stock swap. Lucky acquired Hancock Fabrics in 1972 for $56.7 million in stock. In 1974, Lucky acquired the Oklahoma City-based Sirloin Stockade steakhouse chain for $8.1 million in stock. Lucky acquired Yellow Front Stores along with its sister company Checker Auto Parts in March 1978 for $45.9 million in stock.

Lucky also owned 22 Mays Drugs in Illinois, Iowa, and Wisconsin. Many of them were next to Eagle Food Stores. They were closed or sold in the late 1970s. The Mays Drugs stores in Iowa were sold in 1980 to Revco Discount Drug Stores of Twinsburg, Ohio.

In 1982, the company sold off the Sirloin Stockade chain to the parent company of the Golden Corral buffet chain. In 1983, Lucky closed five Houston-area Gemco discount stores. It also closed 13 Memco stores in the Washington, D.C. area. The Memco stores in the Chicago metropolitan area were converted to Eagle Food Centers in October 1977 and subsequently closed.

=== Takeover attempt ===
By 1986, Lucky was in a tough financial spot with its Gemco subsidiary struggling to compete with the likes of Target and Price Club. At this time, corporate raider Asher Edelman attempted a hostile takeover of the company. In order to fight off the takeover and improve the value of the company, Lucky closed 80 Gemco stores, selling 54 of them to Dayton-Hudson. The company spent $450 million to repurchase up to 22% of its common shares.

By December 1986, Lucky had sold off its Checker and Kragen auto parts subsidiaries, as well as its Yellow Front chain. In 1987, Lucky spun off Hancock Fabrics as an independent company and sold controlling interest in Eagle Food Centers.

=== Marketing ===
During the 1980s and 1990s, TV personality Stephanie Edwards was a spokeswoman appearing in television commercials for Lucky stores. The marketing department was known as LuGem Advertising until 1986, located within the distribution center in Buena Park, California.

=== Acquisition by American Stores ===
In March 1988, the American Stores Company, offered $1.74 billion to acquire Lucky Stores. The deal ultimately closed at $2.5 billion in June, making Lucky a subsidiary along with Jewel-Osco, Acme Markets, Alpha Beta, Buttrey Food & Drug, Osco Drug, Sav-on Drugs, and Star Market.

However, the merger faced significant legal challenges from the California attorney general. By November 1989, the deal was allowed to go ahead in Northern California. Under the terms, 13 Alpha Beta stores were sold there and the rest became Lucky Stores.

The case went all the way to the US Supreme Court. American was forced to sell or close most of its Alpha Beta stores in Southern California and all its stores in Utah. Additionally, it sold Osco Drug stores in Utah, Colorado, and Wyoming, and closed its Skaggs Home Improvement Centers in Utah. In total, the company converted 56 Alpha Beta stores in California, four Alpha Beta stores in Las Vegas, and a Fullerton warehouse into Lucky operations.

The case was only settled in April 1991, when American agreed to sell the rest of its Alpha Beta chain to Food 4 Less for $248 million. The deal saw 145 Alpha Beta stores in the Los Angeles area change hands, with 15 stores in San Diego County being retained and converted to Lucky Stores.

In 1992, Lucky Stores began selling fresh cut flowers in-store through a joint venture with distributors from Mexico. Between 1993 and 1995, Lucky was the subject of an investigation by the city of Los Angeles that showed 67 of the chain's 82 LA stores had price discrepancies between the chain's posted prices and the prices rung up at checkout. Lucky ultimately settled the case in March 1996. In May 1997, American sold its Central California Lucky Stores to Save Mart Supermarkets.

=== Acquisition by Albertsons and demise of brand ===
In August 1998, Albertsons announced that it was acquiring American Stores, the parent of Lucky Stores, for $11.7 billion. The merger was completed in June 1999 after the companies presented plans to sell off 145 stores, some bearing the Lucky name, to avoid the merger being blocked by the U.S. Justice Department. By November 1999, all 480 Lucky Stores took the Albertsons name, and the Lucky brand had ceased to exist.

== Return of the brand ==
=== Grocery Outlet failed attempt to use brand ===
An April 2006 photo of the Grocery Outlet–operated Lucky-branded store in Rocklin, CA. Note the remnants of the Grocery Outlet rainbow logo above the Lucky logo.

In early 2006, Berkeley, California-based Grocery Outlet closed its Rocklin, California, location, only to re-open the store on April 1 with the Lucky name and the classic Lucky logo. In an April 1, 2006, interview with the Sacramento Bee, Grocery Outlet President and COO Bob Tiernan said the "company believes the Lucky brand has value. And the new store format, with an 'every day low pricing' strategy, reminds us of Lucky". Grocery Outlet lawyer Peter Craigie stated that although Albertsons believes that it continues to own the Lucky brand, Grocery Outlet believes that Albertsons' failure to utilize the brand means the company has effectively surrendered the trademark. Grocery Outlet preemptively filed a lawsuit against Albertsons seeking a declaration from Albertsons that the company has surrendered the brand.

On the next day, April 2, Albertsons filed a request for a temporary restraining order for Grocery Outlet's usage of the Lucky mark. At the same time, on the Albertsons website, the Lucky trademark reappeared, as evidence for the mark's use.

The request was denied by the District Court on April 5. Albertsons had argued that it did not intend to abandon the Lucky brand and that Lucky shopping carts still remained at some of its stores. District Judge Jeffrey White ruled that Albertsons failed to demonstrate that the use of the Lucky brand demonstrated unfair competition and that the burden to prove otherwise was wholly the responsibility of Albertsons.

On July 20, the District Court ruled in Albertsons' favor, granting a preliminary injunction preventing Grocery Outlet from using the Lucky name. Grocery Outlet asked the judge to put the order on hold and appealed to the United States Court of Appeals for the Ninth Circuit. The appeals court upheld the ruling in favor of Albertsons on August 9, 2007.

The US District Court declared that Albertsons still retained the rights to the Lucky brand in January 2009. The Rocklin store in question has since closed. A second incarnation of the store opened in December 2012 as a Grocery Outlet in a shopping center on the western edge of town.

=== SuperValu/Cerberus/Albertsons use of brand ===
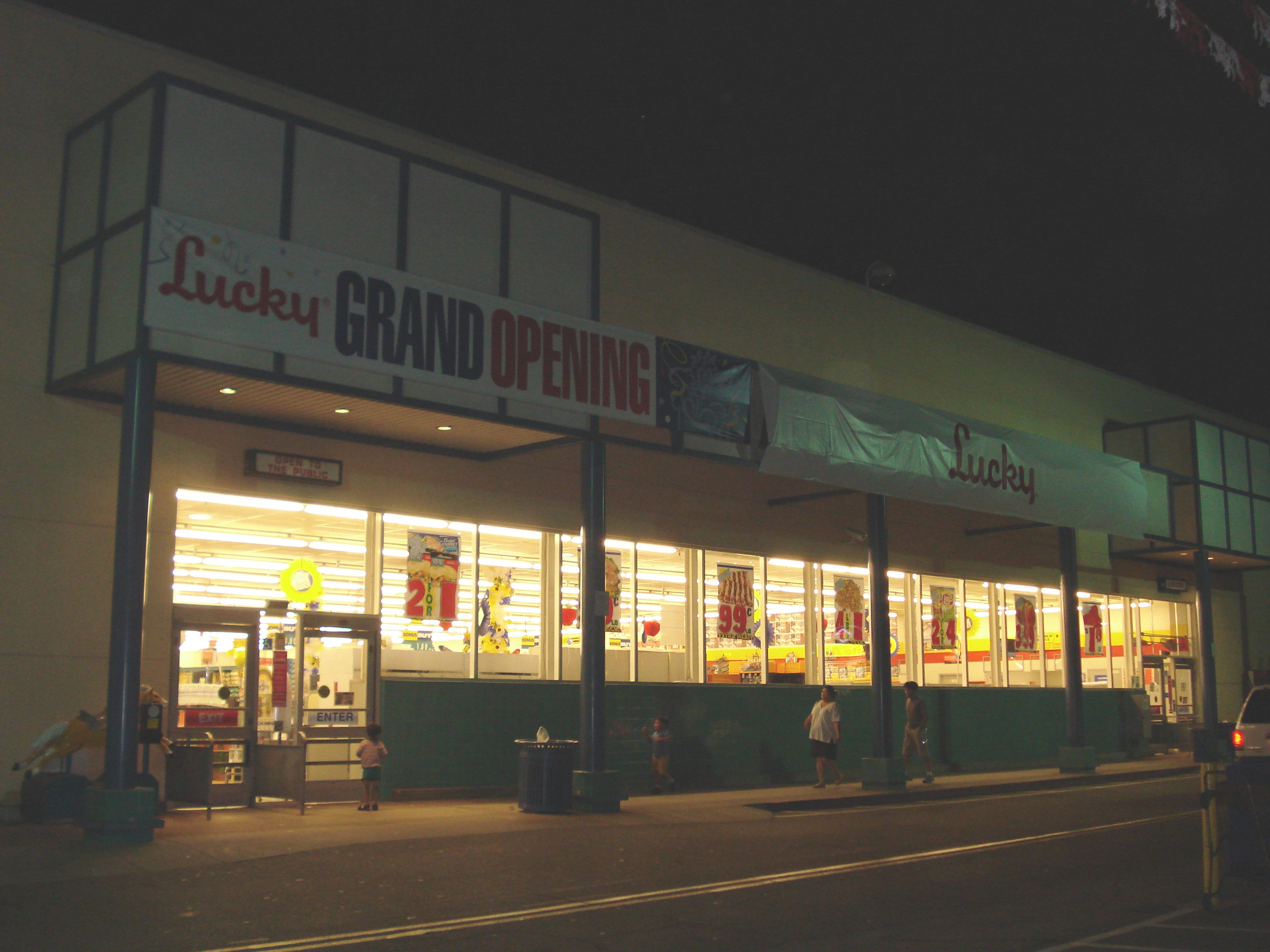
An August 2006 photo of a SuperValu-owned rebranded Lucky store at 1000 E. Valley Blvd. in Alhambra, California. (closed as of February 2010)

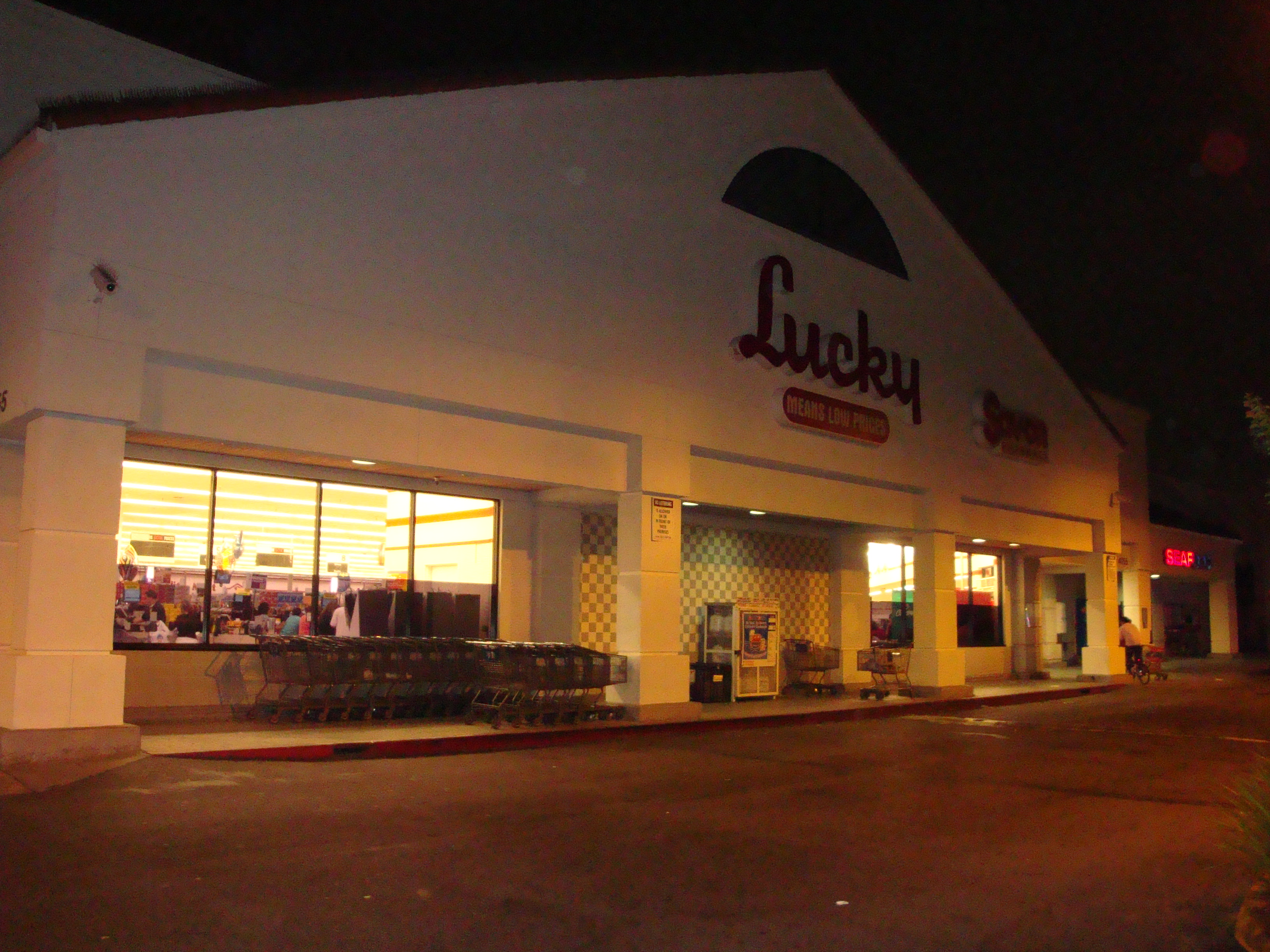
A 2009 photo of a Albertsons-owned rebranded Lucky store at 4155 Tweedy Blvd. in South Gate, California. (closed as of 2020)

In January 2006, Supervalu announced that it was acquiring most of Albertsons, including the Southern California Division. After fulfilling anti-trust obligations, Supervalu completed the acquisition in early June 2006 that included 300 stores in Southern California and Nevada. Those store also included "three Albertsons stores [that] were recently renamed Lucky" after the acquisition had occurred.

Lucky returned in the summer of 2006. When they opened, the new stores did not have rewards cards, did not advertise specials, and did not offer delivery, emphasizing consistently low prices instead. The stores targeted the budget-minded home cook.

In July 2006, Max Foods stores in Alhambra, El Centro, and San Ysidro were rebranded as Lucky by SuperValu. The Lucky store in Alhambra closed four years later.

By October 2006, one Albertsons in North Las Vegas, Nevada, had been rebranded as a Lucky, as well as another in Las Vegas.

Two more Las Vegas-area Albertsons stores, on W. Spring Mountain Road and on Craig Road, were converted to the Lucky brand in June 2007 to join two other Lucky stores, on E. Bonanza Road and E. Lake Mead Blvd. that had been previously converted sometime in 2006. According to company officials in June 2007, no additional changeovers were planned, but depending on how the stores did, there might be a "handful" of additional changeovers. All four Las Vegas-area stores were closed by the beginning of 2009.

In February 2009, SuperValu announced the closing of nine of its Albertsons' Southern California locations with three additional stores in South Gate, Van Nuys, and Oxnard being converted to Lucky. The Van Nuys and the Oxnard stores were opened in June 2009 which brought the total of Lucky stores up to six, all of which were located in Southern California. The Oxnard store closed 16 months later in October 2010.

In 2013, the Van Nuys store closed down and was bought by the unrelated Super King chain of Southern California.

In 2013, Cerberus Capital Management acquired the Albertsons stores from SuperValu, including the Lucky stores under Albertsons control.

In 2018, Lucky entered Utah when two stores in Salt Lake City and West Valley City under Albertsons' no-frills and soon-to-be defunct Super Saver banner were converted to Lucky.

The city of West Jordan in Utah announced the expected February 2019 opening of the Lucky store in their city, which had previously operated as an Albertsons years prior. The fourth store in Utah opened in the following month in Tooele, converting from an Albertsons.

The store in El Centro closed in June 2019.

In 2020, the last remaining Lucky store in Southern California, in South Gate, closed, ending Lucky's presence in Southern California for the second time.

=== Save Mart use of brand ===
Save Mart Supermarkets acquired the Northern California division of Albertsons, with its 132 stores, on November 27, 2006.This included the right to use the Lucky brand in the areas in which Albertsons had previously operated in but reserved for Save Mart's use. In summer 2007, Save Mart converted 72 of the acquired Albertsons stores to the Lucky banner in the San Francisco Bay Area, despite Grocery Outlet's assertion that Save Mart had no rights to the name.

==== Lucky California concept ====
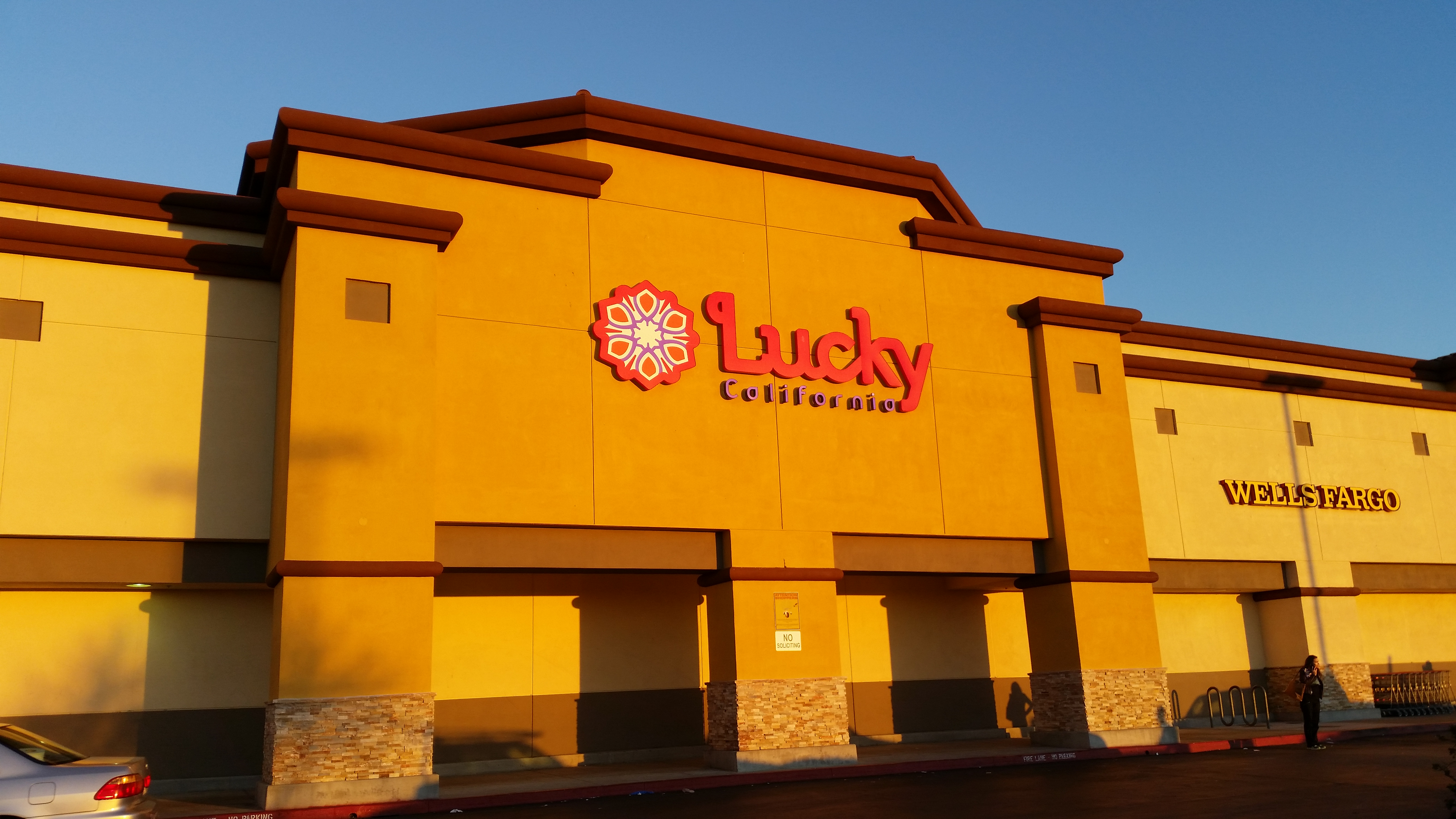
A 2015 photo of a Save Mart-owned Lucky California concept store at 6843 Mission St., Daly City, California.

On July 8, 2015, after a storewide renovation, the Lucky store in Daly City, California, reopened and was rebranded as "Lucky California". Nicole Pesco, Save Mart's Co-President and Chief Strategy and Branding Officer, said the new concept store is "a fusion of Bay Area culture and California sourced and grown, presented with meal solutions at competitive prices".

Save Mart has mostly renovated and rebranded 72 other stores throughout the San Francisco Bay Area. Stores are being redesigned to offer consumers more choices, be a one-stop shop to compete with growing competition, and encourage shoppers to venture through the store.

Save Mart closed three under-performing stores in the Bay Area in November 2023.

== Controversy ==
In October and November 2011, self-checkout machines in 23 Save Mart-owned Northern Californian Lucky stores were compromised with card skimmers, resulting in the loss of thousands of dollars by Lucky's customers.

== Sources ==
- "SuperValu resurrects Lucky brand in California". retailnet.com. July 28, 2006. Archived from the original on September 28, 2007.
- "SuperValu to Get Lucky in Vegas". progressivegrocer.com. July 28, 2006.
