= Yellow Front Stores =

Former American discount store

- Type: Discount store
- Industry: Retail
- Founded: c. 1950s Phoenix, Arizona
- Founder: Jim Kelly
- Defunct: 1990
- Fate: bankruptcy
- Headquarters: Phoenix, Arizona
- Number of locations: 104 (1987); 68 (1990)
- Areas served: Arizona and western United States
- Products: clothing, footwear, sporting goods, automotive

Yellow Front was an American discount store that original started as a single Army surplus store before evolving into a sporting goods chain and later a discount chain.

In the 1950s, Yellow Stores opened in Phoenix as a small store selling Army Surplus items. Jake Henegar bought the company from Jim Kelly in 1960. Henegar led the enterprise until his retirement in the early 1980s.

In the 1960s, Yellow Front Stores added more variety to their stock and increased their locations. By the 1970s, they had stores all over the Southwestern United States. They were, by then, selling outdoor gear such as hunting, camping, and fishing supplies, as well as work clothing, such as Levi Strauss jeans.

Presidents of Yellow Front Stores after Henegar's retirement were Sean Lee, Robert Bove, and David Stoup.

After a quick expansion, Yellow Stores was forced to close all of their Pacific Northwest stores in 1977.

Yellow Front Stores were acquired by Lucky Stores in 1978 for $45.9 million (~$173 million in 2024), but continued to operate as Yellow Front.

In 1987 there were 104 Yellow Front Stores in 8 states. Lucky sold the Yellow Front chain for $50 million during a hostile takeover by Asher B. Eshelman, a New York investor. The purchaser was a corporation owned by Kenmare; a private company owned by Daniel J. Sullivan.

A few months later, Yellow Front purchased the Renton, Washington-based 64 unit Bonanza Stores. No records have been found if Yellow Front was able to convert these stores to the Yellow Front banner before it was forced into bankruptcy.

Yellow Front Stores filed for bankruptcy in 1990 and eventually liquidated all of its stores.
