= Hancock Fabrics =

Fabric retailer

- Type: Public
- Traded as: OTCID Basic No Information: HKFIQ
- Industry: Retail
- Founded: 1957; 69 years ago (Tupelo, Mississippi, U.S.)
- Defunct: July 27, 2016; 10 years ago
- Fate: Chapter 11 Bankruptcy Liquidation
- Headquarters: Baldwyn, Mississippi, United States
- Number of locations: 185 (at the time of closure)
- Key people: Steve Morgan (CEO)
- Number of employees: N/A
- Website: www.hancockfabrics.com

Hancock Fabrics was a specialty retailer of crafts and fabrics based in Baldwyn, Mississippi, United States. Hancock Fabrics operated as many as 266 stores in 37 states under the Hancock Fabrics name. Hancock Fabrics was established by the late Lawrence D. Hancock. On July 27, 2016, all of the stores were closed, marking the end of the chain.

== Retail History ==
=== Early history ===
Hancock Fabrics was founded in 1957 in Tupelo, Mississippi by Elaine (1922-2015) and Lawrence Doyce (L.D.) Hancock (1913-1998), started out as a cost-efficient retail store and offered a greater selection of merchandise to its customers at lower prices.

By 1971, when Lucky Stores bought Hancock Fabrics, the chain owned 81 stores and had 265 additional franchise stores in 19 states.

=== Growth and reorganization ===
In 1985, Hancock Fabrics acquired Minnesota Fabrics, which was based in Charlotte, North Carolina and operated over one hundred stores under the names Minnesota Fabrics and Fabric Warehouse. Fabric Warehouse had originally been part of Hancock before they bought Minnesota Fabrics.

Lucky Stores demerged Hancock in 1987, floating it as a public company. By 1992, the company was one of seven major retail piece-goods chains operating 482 stores in the United States.

=== Closure ===
On March 21, 2007, Hancock Fabrics announced it would file for Chapter 11 bankruptcy. The company closed 104 stores and emerged from bankruptcy in August 2008.

In 2014, Hancock announced plans to take the company private, but later withdrew the proposal.

On April 1, 2016, the U. S. Bankruptcy Court approved the sale of the remaining assets to Great American Group, who announced that the remaining 185 stores will be closed and their assets liquidated. In August 2016, Michaels Stores, Inc. announced its intent to acquire Hancock Fabrics' intellectual property and customer database.
