= Beaconsfield, Iowa =

- City
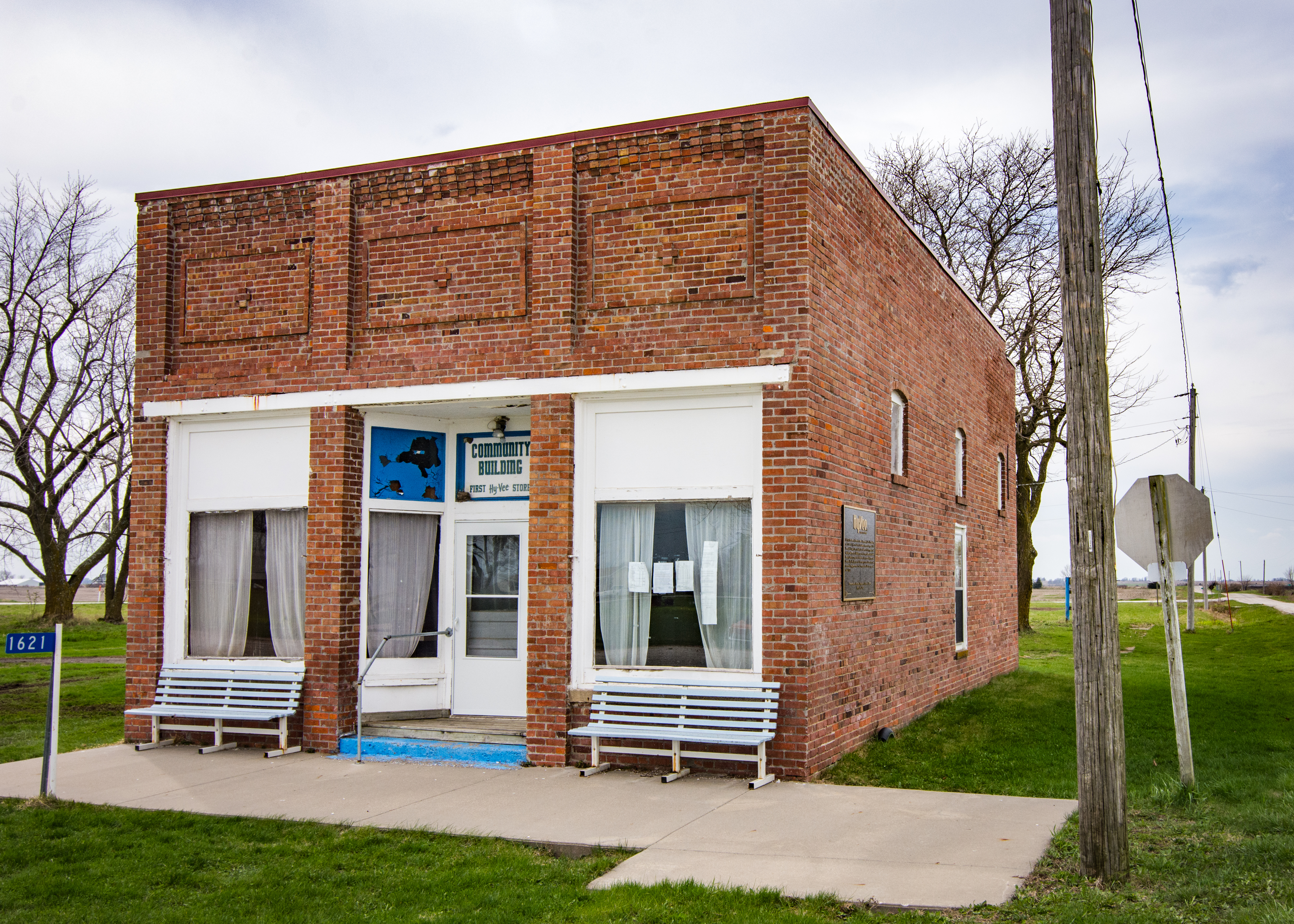
- The Community Building is the birthplace of the Hy-Vee grocery store chain.

- Location of Beaconsfield, Iowa
- Coordinates: 40°48′27″N 94°03′03″W
- Country: US
- State: Iowa
- County: Ringgold

Area
  - Total: 0.73 sq mi (1.89 km^{2})
  - Land: 0.73 sq mi (1.89 km^{2})
  - Water: 0 sq mi (0.00 km^{2})
- Elevation: 1,217 ft (371 m)

Population (2020)
  - Total: 15
  - Density: 20.6/sq mi (7.95/km^{2})
- Time zone: UTC-6 (Central (CST))
  - Summer (DST): UTC-5 (CDT)
- ZIP code: 50074
- Area code: 641
- FIPS code: 19-05095
- GNIS feature ID: 2394093

Beaconsfield is a city in Ringgold County, Iowa, United States. The population was 15 in the 2020 census, unchanged from 2010 and an increase from 11 in 2000. In the 2000 census Beaconsfield was the least populated incorporated city in Iowa; with the increase in the 2020 census, it is now the second smallest, after Le Roy.

== History ==
Beaconsfield started when the Humeston and Shenandoah Railroad built a train station. In 1881 a town company laid it out as a village. A post office was established in 1882 and closed in 1993.

The town was incorporated on January 18, 1990.

The community was named after Lord Beaconsfield of England.

The Hy-Vee grocery chain has its origin in the Beaconsfield Supply Store, a general store opened by Charles Hyde and David Vredenburg in 1930. That location is on the National Register of Historic Places.

On May 23, 1981, a tornado touched down 15.9 miles southwest of Beaconsfield. It was rated F2.

== Geography ==
According to the United States Census Bureau, the city has a total area of 0.72 square miles (1.86 km^{2}), all land.

=== Climate ===
According to the Köppen Climate Classification system, Beaconsfield has a hot-summer humid continental climate, abbreviated "Dfa" on climate maps.

Climate data for Beaconsfield, Iowa, 1991–2020 normals, extremes 1951–present
Month	Jan	Feb	Mar	Apr	May	Jun	Jul	Aug	Sep	Oct	Nov	Dec	Year
Record high °F (°C)	65 (18)	74 (23)	87 (31)	89 (32)	95 (35)	105 (41)	105 (41)	104 (40)	100 (38)	92 (33)	79 (26)	72 (22)	105 (41)
Mean maximum °F (°C)	53.8 (12.1)	57.8 (14.3)	73.0 (22.8)	81.3 (27.4)	85.6 (29.8)	90.3 (32.4)	93.5 (34.2)	92.9 (33.8)	89.0 (31.7)	82.9 (28.3)	69.5 (20.8)	58.1 (14.5)	95.1 (35.1)
Mean daily maximum °F (°C)	30.4 (−0.9)	35.5 (1.9)	48.2 (9.0)	60.5 (15.8)	70.1 (21.2)	79.4 (26.3)	83.5 (28.6)	82.1 (27.8)	75.5 (24.2)	63.1 (17.3)	48.2 (9.0)	35.9 (2.2)	59.4 (15.2)
Daily mean °F (°C)	21.3 (−5.9)	25.8 (−3.4)	37.5 (3.1)	49.1 (9.5)	59.9 (15.5)	69.6 (20.9)	73.9 (23.3)	71.9 (22.2)	64.2 (17.9)	51.9 (11.1)	38.2 (3.4)	27.0 (−2.8)	49.2 (9.6)
Mean daily minimum °F (°C)	12.1 (−11.1)	16.1 (−8.8)	26.9 (−2.8)	37.6 (3.1)	49.7 (9.8)	59.8 (15.4)	64.2 (17.9)	61.7 (16.5)	52.9 (11.6)	40.8 (4.9)	28.3 (−2.1)	18.1 (−7.7)	39.0 (3.9)
Mean minimum °F (°C)	−9.3 (−22.9)	−3.3 (−19.6)	7.0 (−13.9)	23.1 (−4.9)	36.7 (2.6)	48.7 (9.3)	55.3 (12.9)	52.9 (11.6)	39.2 (4.0)	26.6 (−3.0)	11.7 (−11.3)	−1.6 (−18.7)	−13.0 (−25.0)
Record low °F (°C)	−24 (−31)	−25 (−32)	−18 (−28)	8 (−13)	25 (−4)	36 (2)	43 (6)	41 (5)	25 (−4)	14 (−10)	−15 (−26)	−30 (−34)	−30 (−34)
Average precipitation inches (mm)	0.94 (24)	1.32 (34)	2.19 (56)	4.05 (103)	5.27 (134)	5.27 (134)	4.14 (105)	4.10 (104)	4.11 (104)	2.97 (75)	2.12 (54)	1.49 (38)	37.97 (965)
Average snowfall inches (cm)	7.2 (18)	6.2 (16)	3.5 (8.9)	1.3 (3.3)	0.0 (0.0)	0.0 (0.0)	0.0 (0.0)	0.0 (0.0)	0.0 (0.0)	0.5 (1.3)	1.8 (4.6)	6.0 (15)	26.5 (67.1)
Average precipitation days (≥ 0.01 in)	5.1	6.1	7.2	10.2	12.8	10.6	9.5	8.5	7.3	7.9	6.1	5.9	97.2
Average snowy days (≥ 0.1 in)	3.3	3.7	1.6	0.6	0.0	0.0	0.0	0.0	0.0	0.2	1.0	3.2	13.6
Source 1: NOAA
Source 2: National Weather Service

== Demographics ==
Historical population
Census	Pop.	Note	%±
1900	177		—
1910	148		−16.4%
1920	170		14.9%
1930	201		18.2%
1940	148		−26.4%
1950	104		−29.7%
1960	71		−31.7%
1970	48		−32.4%
1980	39		−18.7%
1990	27		−30.8%
2000	11		−59.3%
2010	15		36.4%
2020	15		0.0%
U.S. Decennial Census

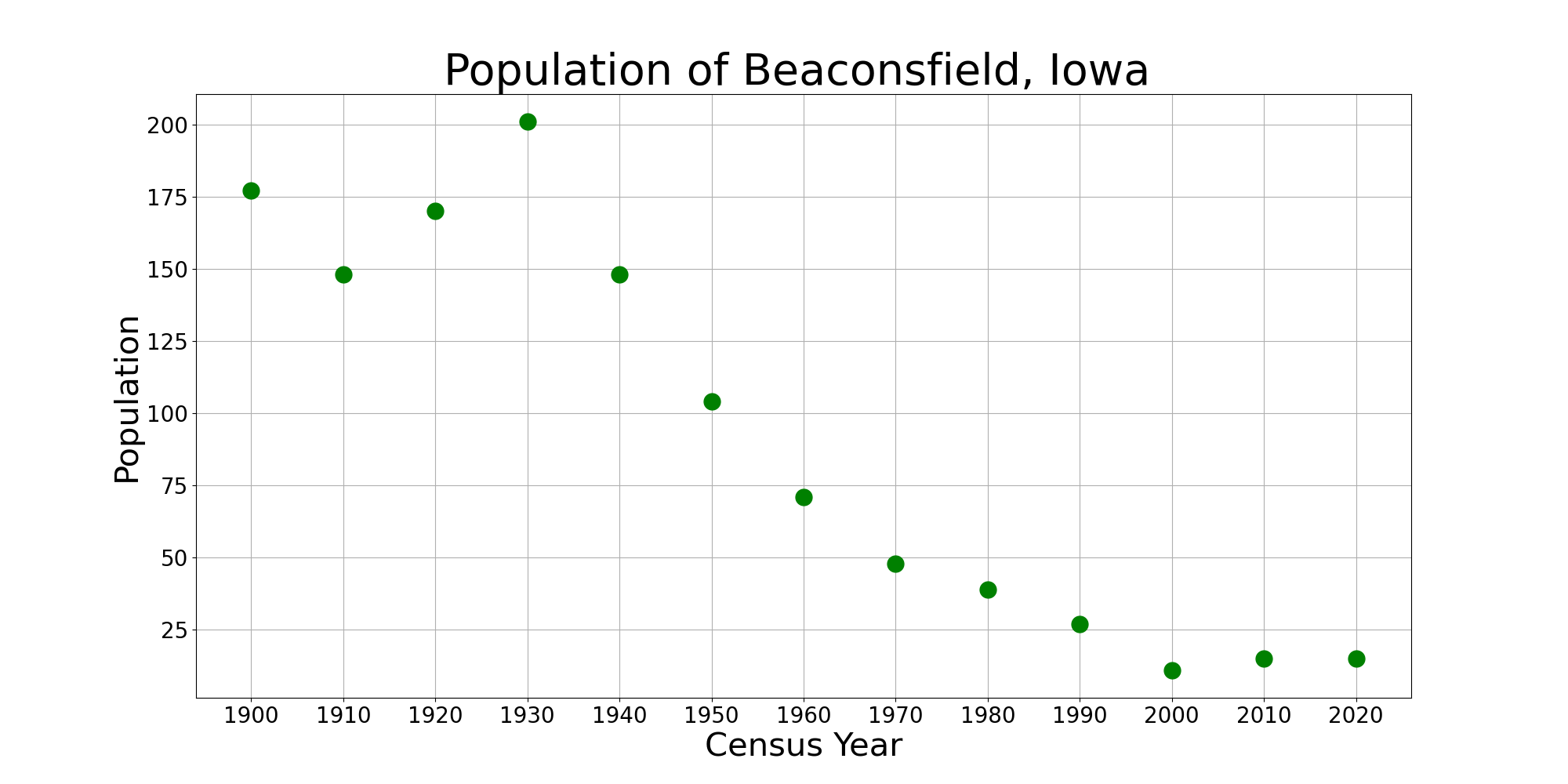
The population of Beaconsfield, Iowa from US census data

=== 2020 census ===
As of the census of 2020, there were 15 people, 12 households, and 8 families residing in the city. The population density was 20.6 inhabitants per square mile (7.9/km^{2}). There were 12 housing units at an average density of 16.5 per square mile (6.4/km^{2}). The racial makeup of the city was 86.7% White, 0.0% Black or African American, 0.0% Native American, 0.0% Asian, 6.7% Pacific Islander, 0.0% from other races and 6.7% from two or more races. Hispanic or Latino persons of any race comprised 13.3% of the population.

Of the 12 households, 66.7% of which had children under the age of 18 living with them, 25.0% were married couples living together, 16.7% were cohabitating couples, 25.0% had a female householder with no spouse or partner present and 33.3% had a male householder with no spouse or partner present. 33.3% of all households were non-families. 25.0% of all households were made up of individuals, 8.3% had someone living alone who was 65 years old or older.

The median age in the city was 53.5 years. 13.3% of the residents were under the age of 20; 0.0% were between the ages of 20 and 24; 6.7% were from 25 and 44; 40.0% were from 45 and 64; and 40.0% were 65 years of age or older. The gender makeup of the city was 53.3% male and 46.7% female.

=== 2010 census ===
As of the census of 2010, there were 15 people, 8 households, and 5 families living in the city. The population density was 20.8 inhabitants per square mile (8.0/km^{2}). There were 14 housing units at an average density of 19.4 per square mile (7.5/km^{2}). The racial makup of the city was 100.0% White.

There were 8 households, of which 62.5% were married couples living together and 37.5% were non-families. 37.5% of households were one person and 25% were one person aged 65 or older. The average household size was 1.88 and the average family size was 2.40.

The median age was 55.5 years. 0.0% of residents were under the age of 18; 6.7% (1) between the ages of 18 and 24; 13.3% (2) from 25 to 44; 40% (6) were from 45 to 64; and 40% (6) were 65 or older. The gender makeup of the city was 46.7% male and 53.3% female.

=== 2000 census ===
As of the census of 2000, there were 11 people, 7 households, and 3 families living in the city. The population density was 15.2 people per square mile (5.9/km^{2}). There were 13 housing units at an average density of 18.0 per square mile (7.0/km^{2}). The racial makup of the city was 100.00% White.

There were 7 households, out of which none had children under the age of 18 living with them, 57.1% were married couples living together, and 42.9% were non-families. 42.9% of households were one person and 42.9% were one person aged 65 or older. The average household size was 1.57 and the average family size was 2.00.

Population spread: 9.1% from 45 to 64, and 90.9% 65 or older. The median age was 70 years. For every 100 females, there were 57.1 males. For every 100 females age 18 and over, there were 57.1 males.

The median household income was $10,833 and the median family income was $11,667. Males had a median income of $0 versus $0 for females. The per capita income for the city was $5,990. There were no families and 20.0% of the population living below the poverty line, including no under eighteens and 20.0% of those over 64.

== Education ==
Mount Ayr Community School District operates public schools serving the community.

== Notable person ==
- Peggy Whitson, NASA astronaut on three expeditions, from October 2009 to September 2017, held the office of The Chief Astronaut.
