= Save Mart Supermarkets =

American grocery store company

The Save Mart Companies
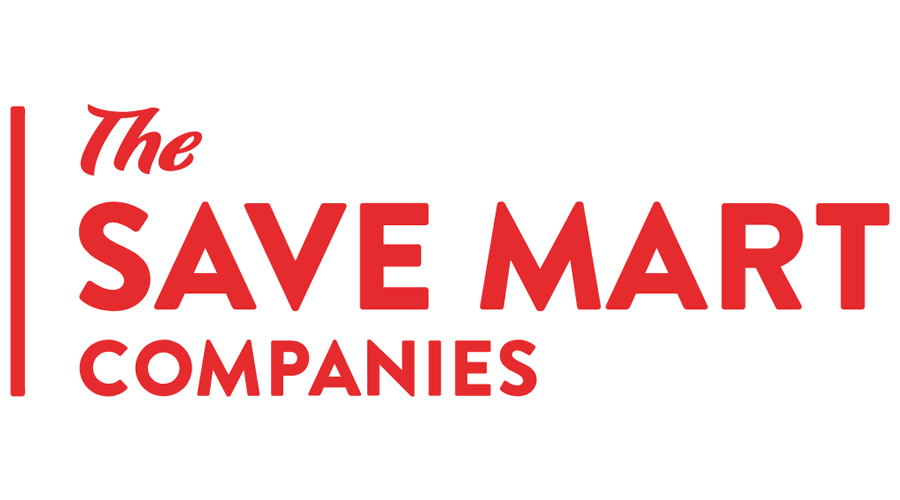
- The logos of the parent company (top) and the supermarket (bottom)
- Type: Private
- Industry: Retail
- Founded: January 17, 1952; 74 years ago in Modesto, California
- Founders: Michael Piccinini and Nicholas Tocco
- Headquarters: Modesto, California, United States
- Number of locations: 194 stores
- Area served: Northern/Central California, Northern Nevada
- Revenue: ▲US$4.6 billion (2019)
- Owner: Jim Pattison Group
- Number of employees: ▼12,000 (2023)
- Subsidiaries: Lucky, FoodMaxx
- Website: thesavemartcompanies.com savemart.com

The Save Mart Companies is a Canadian-owned American grocery store operator founded and headquartered in Modesto, California. It owns and operates stores under the Save Mart, Lucky, and FoodMaxx brands. The stores are located in northern and central California and northern Nevada. The company is owned by the Jim Pattison Group.

== Overview ==
Save Mart stores are full-service grocery stores with a broad product offering, including fresh produce, bakery goods, deli foods and ethnic foods. In Lodi and Stockton, an unrelated Save Mart chain operated and so stores were branded under the S-Mart Foods name. The unrelated chain has since folded and the stores in Lodi and Stockton are now under the Save Mart banner.

== Company history ==
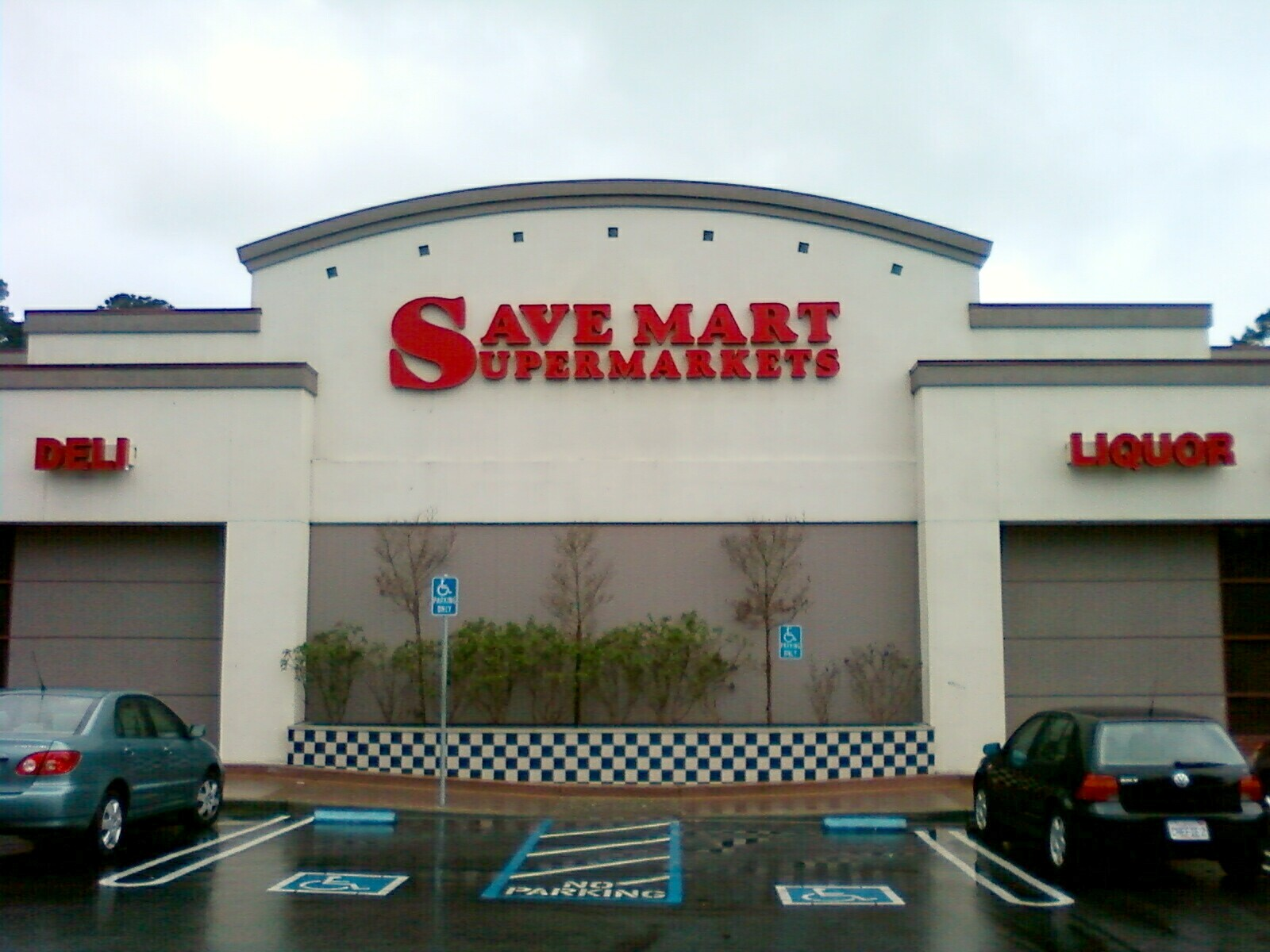
This Pacific Grove, California supermarket (now Lucky California) was one of several former Albertsons stores acquired by Save Mart in 2007.

- 1952 – First Save Mart store opens in Modesto, California.
- 1973 – Yosemite Wholesale opens in Merced, California.
- 1981 – Bob Piccinini is named president.
- 1984 – Save Mart partners with two other retailers to launch Mid-Valley Dairy, producer of Sunnyside Farms products. SMART Refrigerated Transport opens in Turlock, California.
- 1985 – Bob Piccinini purchases Save Mart Supermarkets and becomes CEO.
- 1986 – Opens its first two FoodMaxx stores in Bakersfield, California in partnership with the Fleming Company.
- 1988 – Partners with two other retailers to open Sunnyside Farms Dairy product plant in Turlock.
- 1989 – Acquires 27 Fry's supermarkets in Stockton, California, Lodi, California and in the San Francisco Bay Area.
- 1991 – Helps found and becomes a voting partner in Super Store Industries (SSI).
- 1997 – Acquires ten Lucky stores in California.
- 2006 – Acquires Albertsons stores in the Sacramento, California area, San Francisco Bay Area, Central Valley and northern Nevada and converts them to Lucky and Save Mart stores in 2007. The acquisition marks the company's first foray outside of its home state of California.
- 2012 – Rebrands Monterey Bay Save Mart locations into Lucky stores.
- 2022 – The company is acquired by private equity firm Kingswood Capital Management.
- 2024 – The Save Mart Companies is sold to the Jim Pattison Group of Canada.

== Banners and brands ==
Save Mart Supermarkets includes a number of store banners and private label product brands.

=== Lucky ===
Lucky is a chain of full-service grocery stores with a broad product offering, including fresh produce, bakery goods, deli foods, and ethnic foods. The chain operates in and around the San Francisco Bay Area under its own banner and its newer banner concept, Lucky California. Lucky is a revival of the original chain (with pictures of its stores from the 1940s) after Save Mart acquired the northern California Albertsons stores from Cerberus Capital Management in 2006, which included the rights to use the Lucky name.

=== FoodMaxx ===
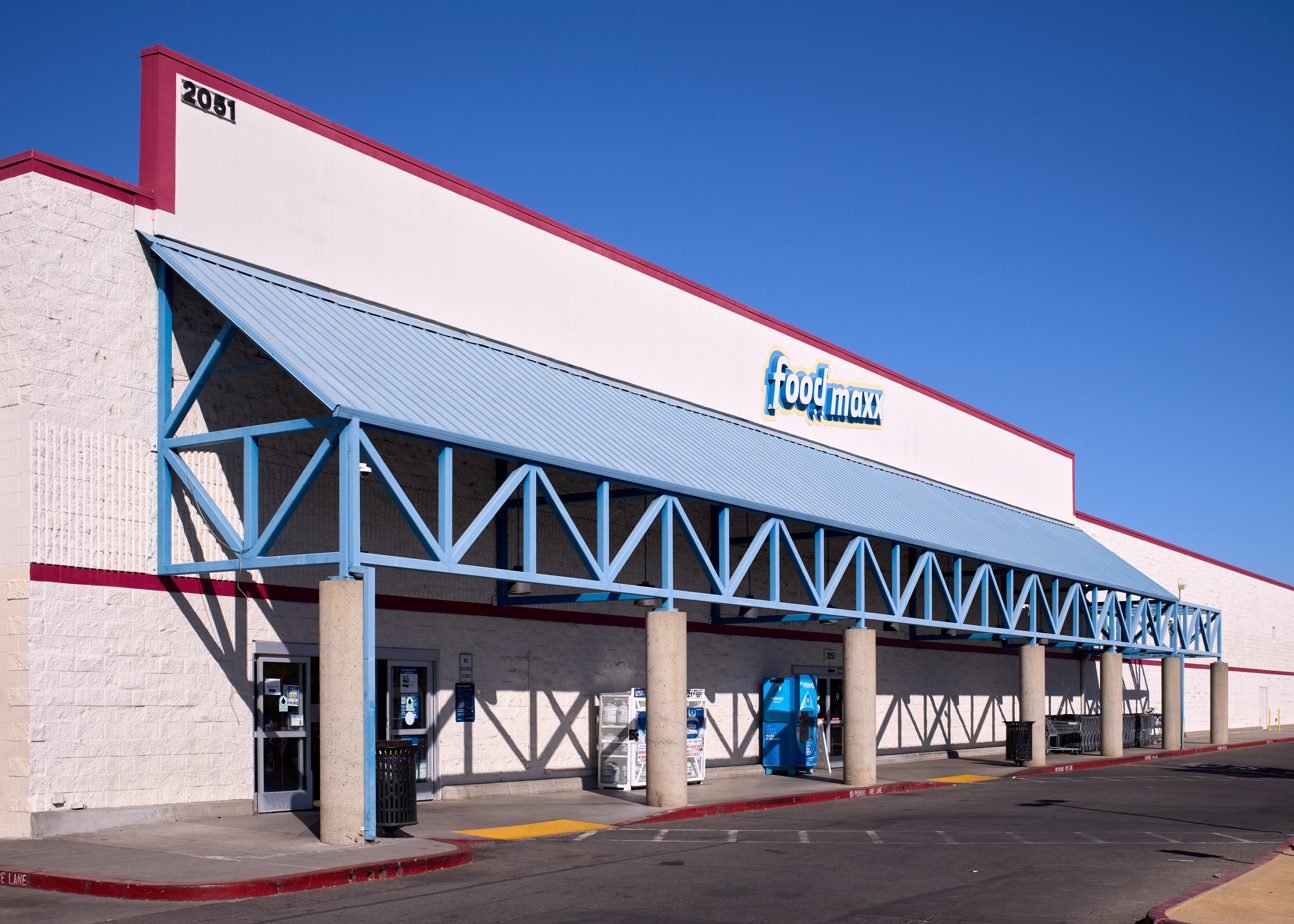
FoodMaxx store in Chico, California

FoodMaxx is Save Mart's warehouse-style grocery chain. It began in 1986, when Save Mart's then-CEO Bob Piccinini saw the potential of the no-frills grocery store concept which offered the same products at a fraction of the price. Piccinini opened two new Food 4 Less stores in the Fresno area.

After the success of the two new Food 4 Less stores, the first FoodMaxx in Fresno opened in 1989. By 2000, 15 stores had opened. As of 2021, There are currently 51 store locations in California and 2 in Nevada.

=== Maxx Value Foods ===
A grocery store in Modesto that offers products at warehouse-store prices without a store club membership fee. It is part of the FoodMaxx banner.

=== Store brands ===
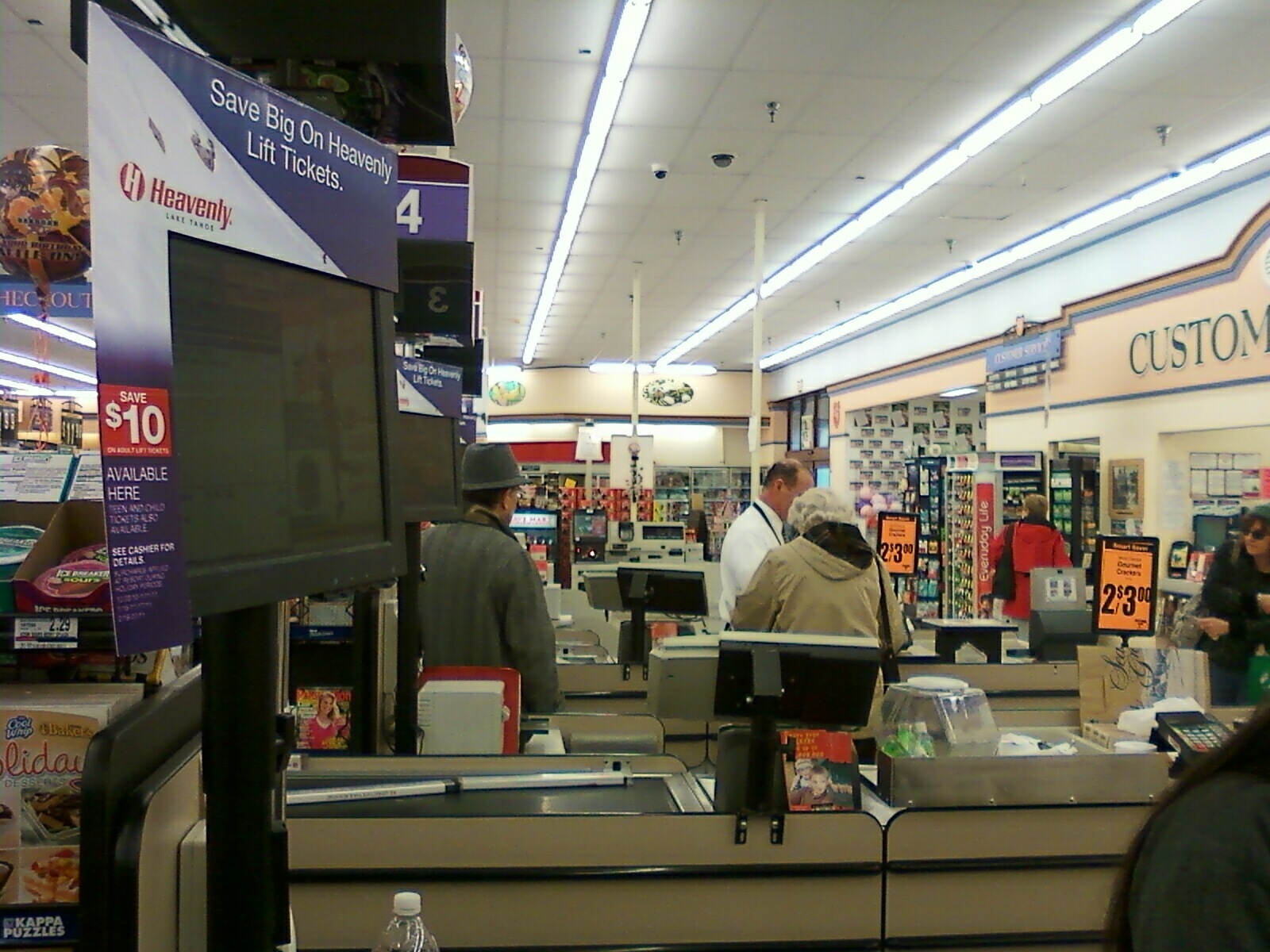
Checkout lanes inside a Save Mart (formerly an Albertsons, now a Lucky California) supermarket in Pacific Grove, California

- Sunny Select – grocery products
- Market Essentials – grocery products
- Simply Done – paper products (toilet paper, napkins, foil, plates, etc.)
- Valu Time – packaged foods and general merchandise
- Sunnyside Farms – dairy and frozen foods
- Bayview Farms – dairy and frozen foods
- Pacific Coast Selections – fresh and packaged foods
- Pacific Coast Café – coffee
- Full Circle – organic packaged foods
- Master Cut – meats
- Maxx Value – meats
- Master Catch – fish and seafood
- Top Care – over-the-counter medications
- Paws Premium – pet food
- Bohemian Hearth – bread
- Lucky California – specialty deli

== Distribution infrastructure ==
Super Store Industries (Lathrop) also produces and packages bottled beverages, cultured dairy products, and frozen dairy products for several brands, including Sunnyside Farms yogurt, Stater Brothers ice cream, and Minute Maid orange juice. SSI owns and operates Sunnyside Farms (Fairfield) and Sunnyside Farms Dairy (Turlock).

- Yosemite Wholesale (Merced) is a dry and packaged good warehouse servicing all of the company's stores.
- Save Mart Supermarkets Distribution Center (Roseville) services all of the company's stores.
- SMART Refrigerated Transport (Lathrop) is a trucking firm that transports dry groceries, frozen foods, ice, and novelties to all of Save Mart Supermarkets’ stores. The company also works as an outside contractor hauling products for other retailers.

== Store closures ==
Since 2010, the company has closed stores in Atwater, Bakersfield, Clovis, Delano, Elk Grove, Folsom, Fresno, Kerman, Larkspur, Madera, Merced, Milpitas, Modesto, Sparks, Selma, Sanger, San Pablo, Tracy and Yuba City, due to competition, higher prices and other reasons.

== Lawsuits ==
In a 2013 settlement with 35 California district attorneys, the company agreed to pay $2.55 million in civil penalties, costs and expenses for violating state law on storage, handling and disposal of hazardous materials, including bleaches, batteries, electronic devices, ignitable liquids, aerosol products and cleaning products.

In 2015 the company agreed to pay $277,319 in back pay and damages to distribution center workers in Vacaville (now closed) and Roseville. A U.S. Department of Labor investigation found the company failed to include bonuses in the employee rate of pay when computing overtime.

== Unions ==
Employees at the company's stores are represented by labor unions. These include: United Food and Commercial Workers, Teamsters, Service Employees International Union and Machinist Automotive Trades District.
