= Eagle Food Centers =

Regional American grocery store chain

- Company type: Grocer, subsidiary of Lucky Stores
- Industry: Retail
- Founded: 1893, Davenport, Iowa, United States
- Defunct: 2003
- Headquarters: Milan, Illinois, United States
- Key people: Tenenbom family (founders); Richard & Maynard Waxenberg; Howard Cohn;, Ben and Morris Geifman; Frank, Bernard & Ira Weindruch
- Products: Bakery, dairy, deli, frozen foods, general grocery, meat, pharmacy, produce, seafood, snacks, liquor
- Parent: Lucky

Eagle Food Centers was a chain of supermarkets that operated in Iowa, Wisconsin, Indiana, and Illinois for several years. The company was based in Milan, Illinois. The company operated stores under many names, including BOGO'S, Eagle Country Market, Eagle Discount Centers, Eagle Discount Supermarkets, Eagle Food Centers, May's Drug and MEMCO. Eagle also operated stores in Houston known as Eagle Supermarkets until March 1985. The chain held a 6% market share and had 1,100 employees before leaving the area.

== History ==
=== Beginning ===
In 1893, Tenenbom family opened the forerunner of Eagle's chain in Davenport. In 1921, Geifman's and Eagle Kash and Karry opened small neighborhood markets in the Quad-Cities, which specialized in fruits and vegetables. These two operations grew during the 1930s as both family operations added new stores. Eagle's was owned by brothers-in-law Frank Weindruch and Isadore Pesses. Max Geifman of Rock Island, and his sons, Ben and Morris, owned the Illinois Geifman stores. Their uncle George and his sons, Morris and Sam owned the Iowa Geifman stores. By 1935 self-service had become important in the grocery business, with Eagle and other stores responding by allowing self-service at lower prices.

=== 1950s–1960s ===
In 1952, Abe Tenenbom died, and his nephew, Richard Waxenberg took over Tenenboms, and the Illinois Geifman's merged their five stores with the eight stores of Davenport's Tenenbom-Waxenberg family. Together they became known as United Supermarkets. In 1954, United merged with 10 stores of Eagle Kash and Karry, forming the largest area chain, called Eagle-United Supermarkets. In 1957, construction was completed of the new 155,000 square feet (14,400 m^{2}) Milan warehouse. The former Eagle warehouse on Fifth Avenue in Moline was sold to Fresh-Pak Candy. In 1961, Eagle was purchased by Consolidated Foods Corp. of Chicago. Consolidated operated 68 Piggly Wiggly stores at that time. The Eagle and Piggly Wiggly operations were then combined and operated from Eagle's corporate office and warehouse in Milan, Illinois. In 1965, Coin Bakery (of Rock Island) was purchased and became a part of Eagle, under the name Harvest Day Bakery.

=== Sale to Lucky ===
In 1968, California-based Lucky Stores bought Eagle Food Centers from Consolidated Foods Corporation. Eagle Food Centers and Piggly Wiggly stores were renamed Eagle Discount Supermarkets, following Lucky's successful discount pricing program. Lucky established Lucky Midwestern Division headquarters in Milan, Illinois.

=== 1980s ===
In 1981, Eagle operated 136 stores and had sales of $1.2 billion (~$3.49 billion in 2024). Eagle expanded into the Midwest by opening a new distribution center in Westville, Indiana. In 1984, a strike by the United Food and Commercial Workers against Eagle Foods Stores created a bitter labor atmosphere. In 1985, after four years of operation, the Westville distribution center closed. In November 1987, Lucky Stores sold majority ownership of Eagle Food Stores to New York-based Odyssey Partners. Odyssey provided a monetary transfusion which allowed Eagle to expand old stores and add new ones. In December 1987, Eagle filed a building permit for a $1.2 million (~$2.83 million in 2024) expansion of its Avenue of the Cities store in Moline, ballooning the store by 13,000 square feet (1,200 m^{2}). In 1988, New stores opened in Galesburg and the Chicago suburb of Downers Grove. In August 1988, Eagle announced construction of a $2.5 million (~$5.7 million in 2024), 42,600-square-foot (3,960 m^{2}) grocery store in East Moline to replace an aging, 27,700-square-foot (2,570 m^{2}) store at 1313 42nd Ave.

In November 1988, Eagle applied for a building permit to allow a $1.2 million, 23,800-square-foot (2,210 m^{2}) expansion of the Milan warehouse, and also announced a $1 million expansion of the Geneseo store, expanding the building from 19,000 to 30,000 square feet (2,800 m^{2}). In August 1989, Eagle became a publicly owned corporation.

=== 1990s ===
In June 1990, Eagle Food Centers elected its first board of directors at the company's first annual stockholders' meeting at the Milan Community Center. In May 1992, Pasquale "Pat" Petitti, chairman of the board and chief executive officer of Eagle Food Centers, Inc., retired after 35 years with the company. In December 1999, Eagle sold five of its Chicago-area stores, leaving 90 stores in Illinois, Iowa and Indiana. Eagle stock price dipped to $2.03, down from a 52-week high of $4.25, and the company reported a net loss of $1.5 million.

== Bankruptcy ==
Eventually, the company found that it was unable to compete with other chains, such as Jewel-Osco, Dominick's, Hy-Vee, Walmart and Kroger. The first sign of this was the sale of the Harvest Day bakery in Rock Island, Illinois, to Metz Baking Company in 1998. The company went into Chapter 11 bankruptcy in March 2000.

In 2003, Eagle Food Stores ceased operations and sold its assets. Some of the stores were acquired by other chains, such as Hy-Vee, Kroger, Jewel, and Butera. The Downtown Eagle Corporation was founded to take over two stores - one in Clinton, Iowa and the other in Dubuque, Iowa. They purchased the rights to the Eagle Country Market name and signage and operate the two stores under the Eagle Country Market name. One location in Coralville, IA, was purchased by GEICO and converted to a call center. One location in Cedar Rapids was bought by Rockwell Collins. Another two sites in Iowa City were bought by Lenoch & Cilek Ace Hardware and Auto Zone. The Buffalo Grove, IL, location was converted into a bowling and entertainment center known as "esKape" - and following a sale to the Brunswick Corporation, it was renovated into the country's third "Brunswick's" upscale bowling center. One of the Eagle stores in Galesburg, Illinois, was later a B&G grocery store created by two former Eagle workers. Now the building is a Dunham's Sports. The other location on East Main Street was razed, and Nees Harley Davidson dealership was built in its place. The Eagle Country Market in Moline, Illinois became a Hy-Vee that has since closed and the one in Rock Island, Illinois was rebranded to Rock Island Country Market, which has also since closed. The Elk Grove Village, IL location became a Food 4 Less that has since closed. The Bolingbrook, IL location became a Best Buy store. There are many Eagle Buildings remaining. Most are occupied by stores; some include Kroger and Hilander (which is Schnucks).
