= Kwik Trip =

Midwestern convenience store and gas station chain

Kwik Trip, Inc.

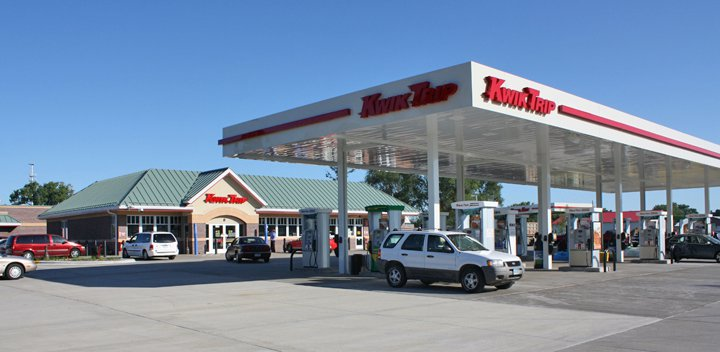
- A typical Kwik Trip store
- Trade name: Kwik Trip (in Wisconsin, Minnesota, and Michigan); Kwik Star (in Iowa, Illinois, South Dakota, North Dakota, and Nebraska)
- Type: Private
- Industry: Retail
- Founded: 1965 (61 years ago) in Eau Claire, Wisconsin
- Founder: John Hansen, Don Zietlow
- Headquarters: La Crosse, Wisconsin
- Number of locations: 878 (Jul. 2024)
- Area served: Illinois; Iowa; Michigan; Minnesota; Nebraska (planned); North Dakota; South Dakota; Wisconsin
- Key people: Scott Zietlow (CEO); Tom Reinhart (COO); Jeff Wrobel (CFO)
- Products: Coffee; Hoagies; Prepared foods; Gasoline; Beverages; Snacks; Dairy products; Salads
- Services: Convenience store; Gas station; Fast food; Car wash
- Owner: Zietlow Family
- Number of employees: 36,457 (2024)
- Website: www.kwiktrip.com

Kwik Trip is a chain of convenience stores founded in 1965 that has locations throughout Wisconsin, Minnesota, and the Upper Peninsula of Michigan under the name Kwik Trip, and in Illinois, Iowa, South Dakota, and North Dakota under the name Kwik Star. The company also operates stores under the name Tobacco Outlet Plus, Kwik Spirits, and Stop-N-Go. The company is privately owned by the Zietlow family and is headquartered in La Crosse, Wisconsin.

Unlike many other convenience store chains, Kwik Trip is a food service leader; the company is vertically integrated across most of its product lines. Kwik Trip also has an internal bakery operation that provides bread, doughnuts, and muffin products to its stores, along with a store-brand snack line called "Urge!". The company maintains branding partnerships with several Upper Midwest professional sports teams, including Minnesota's Twins, Vikings, and Wild and Wisconsin's Green Bay Packers, Milwaukee Brewers, and Milwaukee Bucks.

All locations have small grocery sections selling basic fruits, bread, canned food, frozen food, sliced cheeses, and ice cream, along with traditional convenience store food such as bottled drinks and hot dogs. Notably, the chain has sold bananas, baking potatoes, and yellow onions for 39 cents per pound as a loss leader, along with fresh beef, hot dogs, bratwurst, and chicken. All stores also have heated and ready-to-eat food, and will cook food to order off of a small menu. Many stores have EV chargers.

== History ==
=== Early Kwik Trip ===
"Kwik Trip" was founded as a small grocery store by John and Donna Hansen on June 16, 1965. This store was in Eau Claire, Wisconsin, at 1402 South Hastings Way and was considered a "new type of store" for the town. Gateway Foods executive D.B. "Reiny" Reinhart was brought in as an investor from the beginning, and another Gateway Foods executive Don Zietlow would join later as another investor. The model was similar to convenience stores found in the southern and western U.S. at the time. The stores were open every day, including holidays, and did not sell fuel at first.

Kwik Trip added new stores in the Eau Claire area in the following years and added gasoline in 1970. The first La Crosse location opened in 1971, and in 1973, a distribution center was built and the headquarters moved to La Crosse. In the late 1970s and 1980s, Kwik Trip saw an influx in company growth; it expanded its corporate offices three times and the distribution center twice, and in 1986 it hit the 100-store mark.

In 1993, Kwik Trip opened its first location in Iowa under the name Kwik Star to avoid confusion with QuikTrip, which had stores in Iowa. Its first retail car wash, which soon became a staple for the brand, opened in 1997. In 1999, Kwik Trip merged its petroleum, grocery, fresh delivery, and fleet maintenance departments to form its own transportation subsidiary, Convenience Transportation, LLC.

=== Since 2000 ===
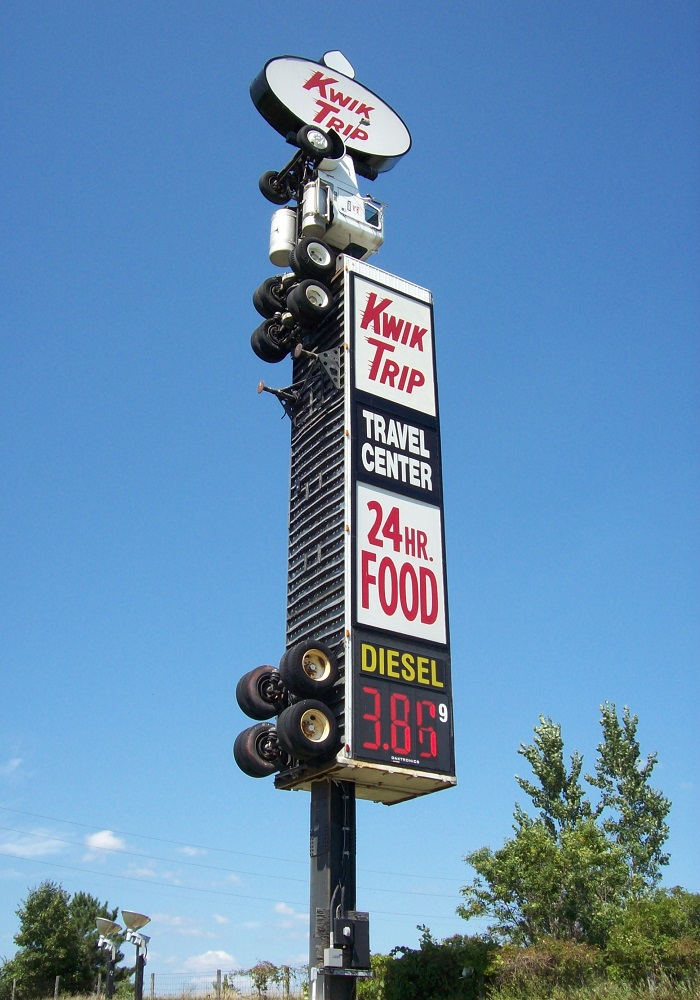
Kwik Trip sign at Mauston, Wisconsin

The Zietlow family bought out Hansen's 50% share of Kwik Trip, Inc., in 2000, making them the sole owner. In the following years the company adopted a new growth strategy of 20 stores a year. Glazers, a donut inspired by Krispy Kreme, were introduced in 2003 and were an immediate hit. Also in 2003, Kwik Trip introduced the hot spot and roller grill. The hot spot holds a variety of standard American offerings, including cheeseburgers and chicken sandwiches, kept warm under a heat lamp. The company looked to differentiate itself by focusing on cleanliness everywhere, on the theory that a clean store attracts more customers and makes them trust the food more.

By 2016, Kwik Trip had over 500 stores, all privately owned. In 2017, it acquired the chain PDQ and brought its fried chicken recipe to all stores. In 2020, it acquired Stop–N–Go. On December 8, 2020, the first Kwik Star opened in Illinois, a former Stop-N-Go store in Rochelle.

Starting in 2022, the company started to expand beyond to several surrounding states. Its first location in the Upper Peninsula of Michigan was in Ironwood, opened in 2022. Next, using the Kwik Star brand, locations were opened in Brandon, South Dakota in 2023 and in Fargo, North Dakota in 2025. In May 2026, Kwik Trip announced that it would pursue expansion into Nebraska under the Kwik Star brand name.

On January 1, 2023, Kwik Trip CEO Don Zietlow retired to take care of his wife. His son, former Mayo Clinic trauma surgeon Scott Zietlow, succeeded him as president and CEO.

Until May 2024, it carried bagged milk and orange juice in pouches under the Nature's Touch brand via its in-house dairy.

Kwik Trip has also begun to offer home delivery of hot food in select markets through a partnership with EatStreet.

== Locations ==
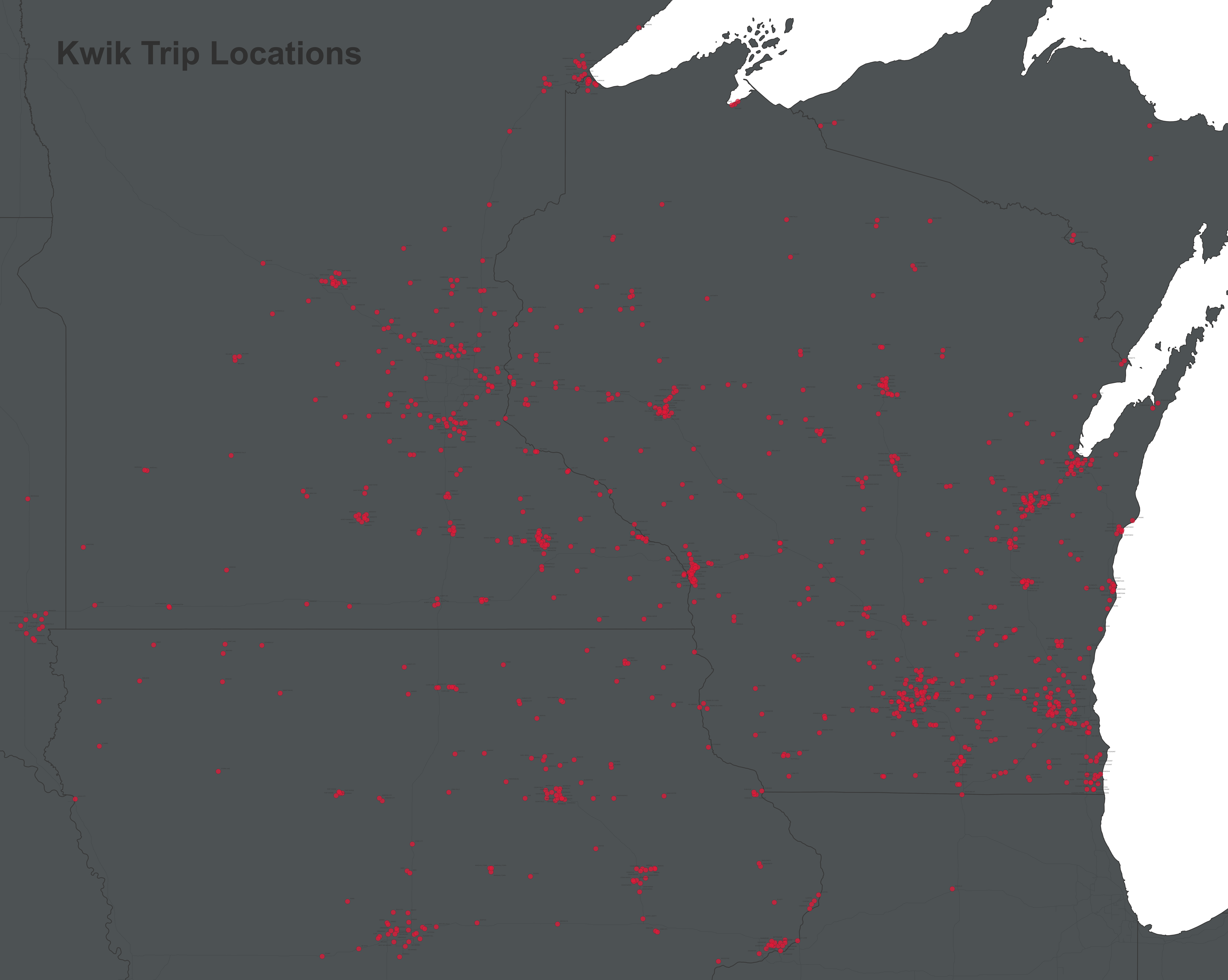
Kwik Trip locations

As of April 2026, Kwik Trip Inc. operates 924 stores across seven states. Kwik Trip and Kwik Star are full-service convenience stores that sell a basic grocery selection, ready-to-eat food, and gasoline. Kwik Star is the name used for Kwik Trip stores in Iowa and Illinois because the similar-sounding brand QuikTrip operates in those states. The Kwik Star name is also used for stores in South Dakota and North Dakota. Stop-N-Go is a brand of smaller stores acquired in 2020 that doesn't provide all the same amenities.

Stores off major highway exits operate as full-service truck stops, with dual-pump fuel islands. They have overnight parking, showers, and are open 24/7. Automatic car washes are also available at many stores, with some restrictions on availability and hours due to local noise and environmental ordinances.

The Kwik Spirits brand started in December 2022 and sold only alcoholic beverages and tobacco products. These stores may be stand-alone or within another Kwik Trip to comply with local regulations on these products. Tobacco Outlet Plus is a brand of smaller stores that specializes in tobacco products in an age-restricted store. It was acquired in 2015 and since then, only a few stores have been converted into full service c-stores.

Kwik Trip also operates a restaurant known as Hearty Platter in Bonduel, Wisconsin. It sells the same food available in all stores, but in a sit-down restaurant fashion. Since 2015, Denny's has operated restaurants in four Kwik Trip stores that used to be Hearty Platter locations.

La Crosse, Wisconsin is home to Kwik Trip's 140-acre headquarters and distribution center. This campus was established in 1973 and has expanded several times since. The company bought an office building nearby in Onalaska in 2023. A second distribution center was opened in DeForest, Wisconsin, in November 2025. The company is considering additional distribution centers in the Minneapolis–Saint Paul, Minnesota or Des Moines, Iowa area as it looks to expand further westward.

== Vertical integration ==
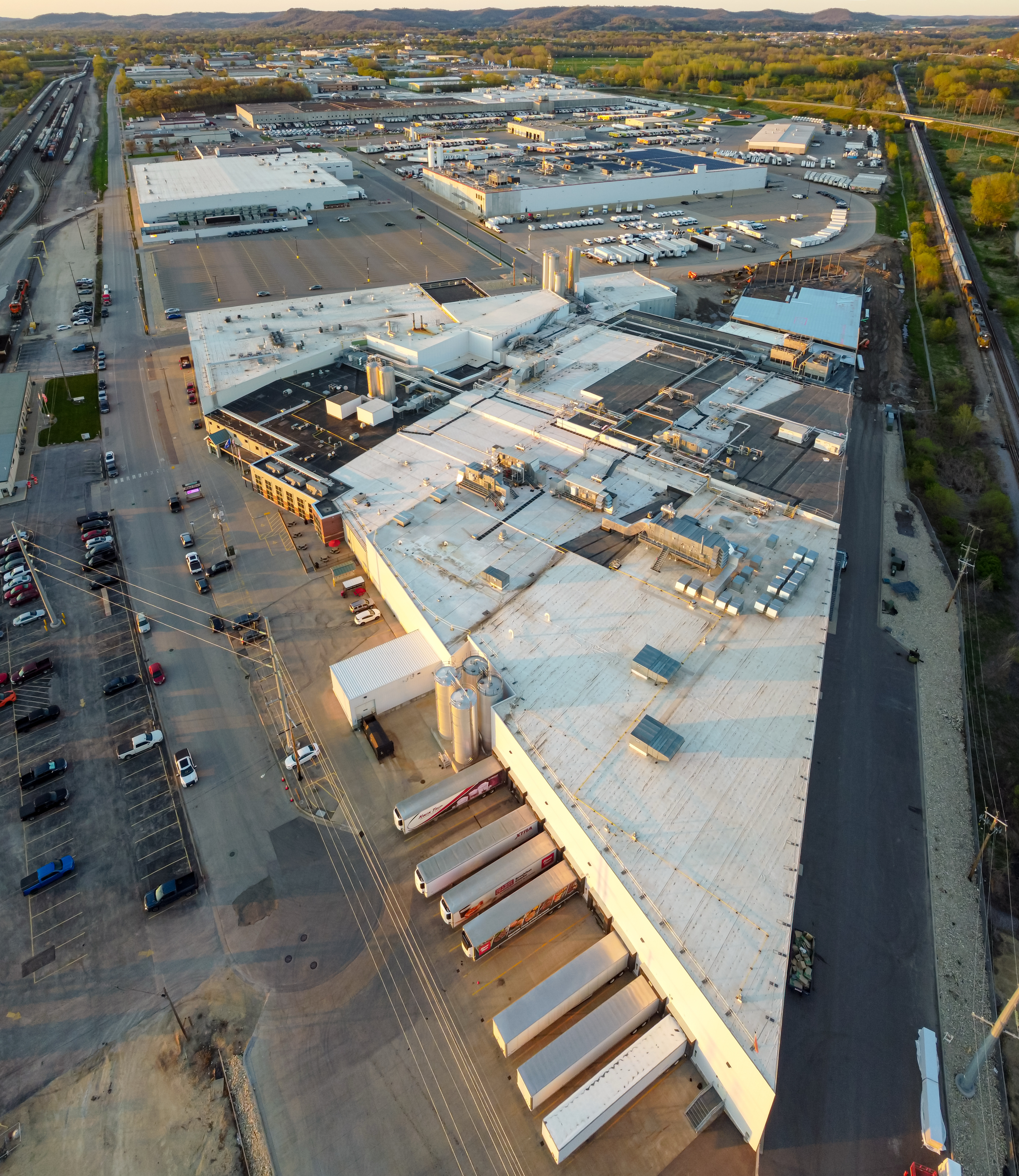
The Kwik Trip headquarters in La Crosse

Kwik Trip is vertically integrated across most of its product lines, with 80% of its sales being Kwik Trip brand products. The company's La Crosse headquarters has its production and distribution facilities that allow for products to be made and shipped to stores "overnight". The company also operates a secondary distribution center in DeForest, Wisconsin, which serves stores in the southeast Wisconsin area. Convenience Transportation LLC is a subsidiary that handles the logistics of distribution and maintains its fleet of trucks.

Its various private label brands include:

- Karuba: in-store coffee
- Kitchen Cravings: pre-packaged meals, hot food, and raw meats
- Kwikery Bake Shop: baked goods, including Glazers donuts and many varieties of bread
- Nature's Touch: water, juice, eggs, and dairy products
- Urge: snacks

== Role in Upper Midwestern culture ==
Kwik Trip is considered a "cultural icon" with a "cult-like following" in the Upper Midwest. Some Wisconsinites have taken wedding photos there or bought Kwik Trip-themed underwear. Wisconsin comedian Charlie Berens has helped promote Kwik Trip, saying part of its appeal comes from the sense of community it can bring to remote places.

== Company values ==
Kwik Trip has strong values regarding its treatment of its employees. The company gives 40% of its profit to its coworkers, which leads to a yearly bonus of about 10%. Kwik Trip's retail holdings are jointly owned by employees under Convenience Store Investments Inc.

=== Workplace honors ===
In 2011, The Milwaukee Journal Sentinel named Kwik Trip the number one large workplace (over 500 employees) for workers in Southeastern Wisconsin. Kwik Trip beat out Mortgage Guaranty Insurance Corporation (MGIC) for the first spot.

In 2018, Convenience Store Decisions honored Kwik Trip as the 2018 Convenience Store Chain of the Year.
