= PDQ Food Stores =

Defunct American convenience store chain

- Industry: Retail
- Founded: 1948; 78 years ago in Middleton, Wisconsin
- Founder: Sam Jacobsen
- Defunct: October 9, 2017; 8 years ago
- Fate: Acquired by Kwik Trip in 2017

PDQ Food Stores was a chain of convenience stores located in the Wisconsin areas of Milwaukee and Madison, and one California store in Tahoma.

The chain began as Tri Dairy Store in 1948 in Middleton, Wisconsin, opened by Sam Jacobsen. Originally the store carried only dairy products, but Jacobsen added other grocery products as time went on, and business improved. The second store didn't come along until 1962; the name PDQ, an acronym for "pretty darn quick" or "pretty damn quick", was a popular catch phrase in the post-World War II era, and the name was suggested by Jacobsen's wife Mary. The original store soon adopted the name as well.

As of January 2016, PDQ Food Stores numbered 34 locations. Most sold gasoline, as is common with modern convenience stores. On May 1, 2009, PDQ Food Stores was sold to the employees and was 100% employee owned.

On July 19, 2017, Kwik Trip Stores signed an agreement to acquire the assets of PDQ Food Stores. The acquisition was completed on October 9, 2017, and Kwik Trip remodeled and re-imaged the existing PDQ locations over the following weeks.

There is a PDQ store in Boulder, Colorado, which is unaffiliated with Kwik Trip or the prior PDQ Stores brand. (The cited link doesn't verify this. From personal experience the PDQ store in Boulder is affiliated with the prior PDQ stores brand (founder's son went to school in Boulder and personally oversees this location.))
