= Iowa Events Center =

Public events complex

Coordinates: 41.591944°N 93.621667°W

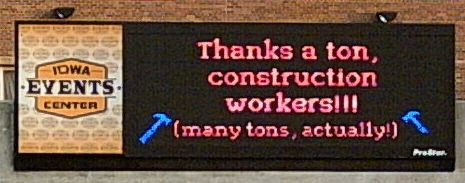
The Iowa Events Center's marquee thanked the construction workers for their efforts after Wells Fargo Arena opened.

The Iowa Events Center is a public events complex located in downtown Des Moines, Iowa, United States.

== History ==
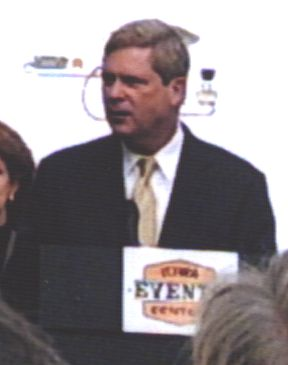
Gov. Tom Vilsack speaks at the Wells Fargo Arena dedication ceremony on July 12, 2005.

The Iowa Events Center originally consisted of the existing Vets Auditorium, the existing Polk County Convention Complex, the new Hy-Vee Hall, and the new Casey's Center. The new buildings were designed by Populous (formerly HOK Sport Venue Event), who were also the architects of the renovated Principal Park in Des Moines, the United Center in Chicago, and many other arenas and stadiums in the United States. The project cost $217 million, making this the largest public project in Iowa history. Funding for the project came from Polk County and its cities, private donations, and the Vision Iowa Fund that Gov. Tom Vilsack signed into law in 2000. Gambling profits from the Prairie Meadows casino in nearby Altoona are expected to pay off the debt.

Construction began in early 2002 after Polk County reached a project-labor agreement with local labor unions that guaranteed favorable wages and working conditions in exchange for no work stoppages. Polk County was soon sued by right to work supporters who claimed that the use of a project-labor agreement on a public project violated Iowa's right to work laws. The lawsuit halted construction for several months, but on November 14, 2002, the Iowa Supreme Court ruled in Polk County's favor.

On April 22, 2004, Polk County agreed to transfer management of the Iowa Events Center to Global Spectrum, a Comcast subsidiary, of Philadelphia. Global Spectrum soon announced that the new Iowa Stars hockey team would be the center's primary tenant. In September 2004, Global Spectrum announced that ticket purchases will be done through Patron Solutions, another Comcast subsidiary, instead of Ticketmaster.

== Venues ==
=== Current ===
==== Casey's Center ====
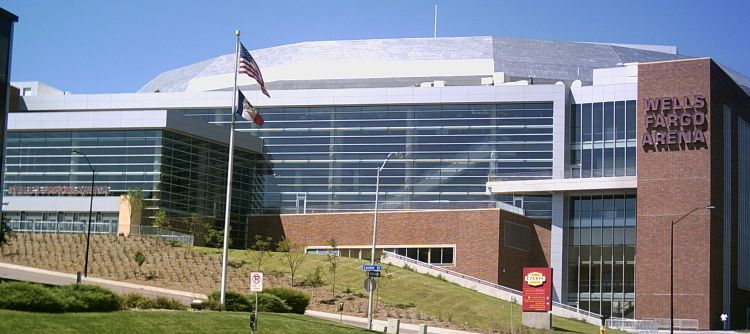
Casey's Center

Named for title sponsor Casey's, Casey's Center (formerly named Wells Fargo Arena) has been the Des Moines area's primary venue for sporting events and concerts since it opened on July 12, 2005. The state high school wrestling and basketball tournaments have been held there since 2006. In fall 2007, it became home to the Iowa Energy (later named Iowa Wolves) of the NBA D-League/G League. The following spring, the reactivated Iowa Barnstormers arena football began playing at the Casey's Center. Casey's Center seats 15,181 for hockey games, 16,110 for basketball games, and as many as 16,980 for concerts.

==== EMC Expo Center ====
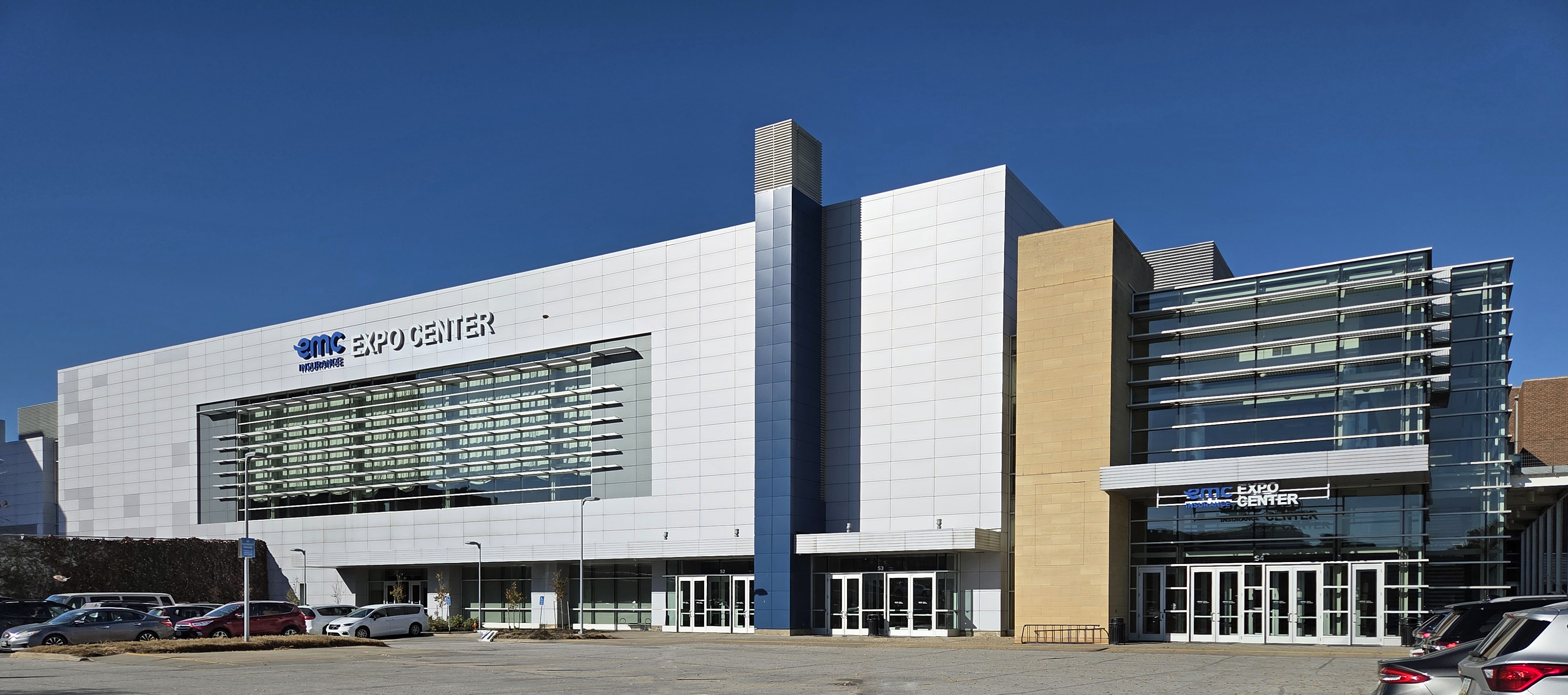
EMC Expo Center

EMC Expo Center (formerly named Hy-Vee Hall, which the Hy-Vee supermarket chain (based in West Des Moines) owned the naming rights to), is the Iowa Events Center's new exhibition hall. It features 100,000 square feet (9,000 m^{2}) of space for trade shows, conventions, and other major events. It also features eight meeting rooms with a total of 15,000 square feet (1,400 m^{2}) of meeting space. The south end of Hy-Vee Hall houses the Iowa Hall of Pride, which honors the achievements of Iowa high school athletes and performers.

Although it was still incomplete, Hy-Vee Hall hosted its first event, the Autumn Festival, from October 21 through October 23, 2004. It was formally dedicated on December 15, 2004, while the Iowa Hall of Pride opened to the public on February 23, 2005.

==== Community Choice Credit Union Convention Center ====
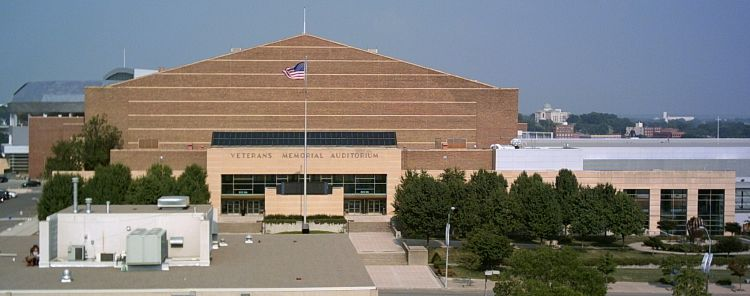
Community Choice Credit Union Convention Center

Originally an arena known as Veterans Memorial Auditorium that served as home to Drake University basketball and Iowa Barnstormers arena football, Community Choice Credit Union Convention Center was renovated and reopened as a convention hall in January 2012.

=== Former ===
==== Polk County Convention Complex ====
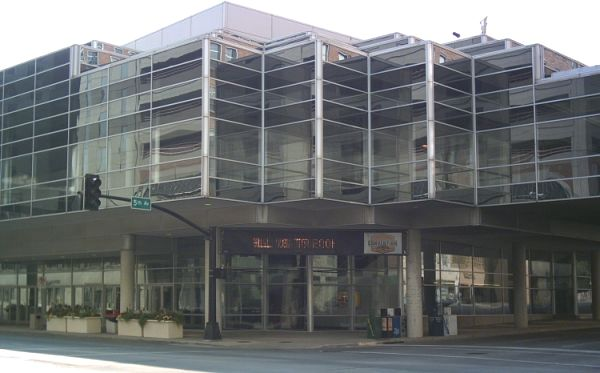
Polk County Convention Complex

Nicknamed "The Plex" the Polk County Convention Complex opened in 1985. It features 60,000 square feet (5,600 m^{2}) of exhibition space on two levels and 27 meeting rooms. Polk County originally planned to close the Convention Complex when Hy-Vee Hall opened, but they decided to transfer management of the building to Global Spectrum in August 2004. While the Convention Complex is located south of the other buildings, Global Spectrum marketed it as part of the Iowa Events Center. The facility has since been converted into a YMCA.
