= Jewel-Osco =

American supermarket chain

- Formerly: Jewel (1899–1902); Jewel Tea Company (1902–1967); Jewel Companies, Inc. (1967–1991)
- Type: Subsidiary
- Industry: Retail
- Founded: 1899 (127 years ago) in Chicago, Illinois, U.S.
- Founder: Frank Vernon Skiff
- Headquarters: Itasca, Illinois, U.S.
- Number of locations: 189 (2025)
- Area served: Illinois, Iowa, and Indiana
- Key people: Tom Lofland (president)
- Products: Bakery, dairy, deli, frozen foods, grocery, meat, pharmacy, produce, seafood, snacks and flowers
- Services: supermarkets/food-drug stores
- Parent: American Stores (1984–1999); Albertsons (1999–present)
- Website: jewelosco.com

Jewel-Osco (usually referred to as Jewel) is a regional supermarket chain in the Chicago metropolitan area, headquartered in Itasca, a western suburb. In 2025, the company had 189 stores across northern, central, and western Illinois; eastern Iowa; and portions of northwest Indiana. Jewel-Osco has been a wholly owned subsidiary of Boise-based Albertsons since 1999. The company began as a door-to-door coffee delivery service before it expanded into delivering non-perishable groceries and later into grocery stores, and supermarkets. Prior to its 1984 acquisition by American Stores, Jewel evolved into a large multi-state holding company that operated several supermarket chains and other non-food retail chain stores located from coast to coast and had operated under several different brand names.

== History ==
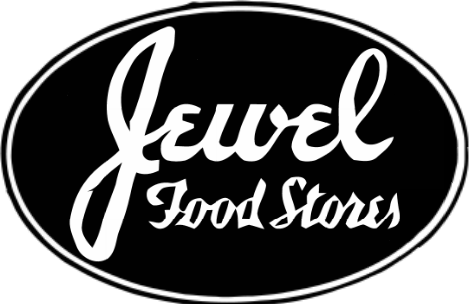
Jewel Food Stores logo until 1980

Jewel Osco former logo

=== Beginnings with home deliveries ===
In 1899, Frank Vernon Skiff founded Jewel in Chicago as a door-to-door coffee delivery service. In 1902, Skiff partnered with his brother-in-law Frank P. Ross, renaming the venture the Jewel Tea Company. By 1903, they had six routes, then 12 routes in 1904 with expansion into Michigan City, Kankakee, and Kewanee. There were 850 routes by 1915. In the early 1900s, it ran a "coffee train" of 40 cars carrying coffee beans exported from South America.

During WWI, the company faced soaring costs for materials and production. Compounding this, the US government commandeered a key Jewel production facility. As a result, by 1919 the company was experiencing severe financial setbacks. Within a few years, it returned to profitability through the leadership of new company officials: retired Commanders John M. Hancock and Maurice H. Karker, who had both gained extensive logistics experience as US Navy supply officers during the war.

In 1929, the company built a new office, warehouse, and coffee roasting facility in suburban Barrington, Illinois, creating hundreds of local jobs despite the Great Depression. The Barrington location served as the headquarters and main warehouse facility for both the home delivery and food store divisions until the completion of the new warehouse and office complex at Melrose Park in 1953.

In 1949, deliveries were provided on 1876 routes in 43 states to customers mostly in small towns. Customers in cities could visit 154 company-owned grocery stores.

Later, the service expanded to include 350 grocery and 10,000 general merchandise items by 1981 when Jewel sold its "Jewel Home Shopping Service" division to its employees and divest itself from its roots. At the time of the divestiture, the division provided service to customers in mostly small towns located along 1000 routes in 42 states. The division became a 700-member owned cooperative called "J.T.'s General Store" in which route sales persons were independent agents.

In October 1994, a group of the company's managers acquired the assets of "J.T.'s General Store" and "created J.T. Dealers Sales and Service". By 1995, "J.T. Dealer Sales and Service" was providing service to 60,000 customers along 250 routes in 35 states.

=== Grocery stores ===
The company's expansion continued throughout the mid-20th century. In 1932, Jewel acquired the Chicago unit of the Canadian firm Loblaw Groceterias, Inc., then a chain of 77 self-service stores, as well as four Chicago grocery stores operated by the Middle West Stores Company, and began operating them under the name Jewel Food Stores. In 1934, Jewel Food Stores merged with Jewel Tea Company. In 1937, Jewel Tea Company purchased an eight-story building in Chicago's Central Manufacturing District, which served as Jewel Food Stores' headquarters until 1954.

The name of the parent company remained "Jewel Tea Company" until 1967 when the stockholders voted to change the name to Jewel Companies, Inc. to better reflect the expansion of the company into different markets. In 1967, the company went public and its stock was traded on the Midwest Stock Exchange.

=== Eisner acquisition and expansion south ===
In 1957, Jewel acquired the Champaign-based Eisner Food Stores, located in downstate Illinois and later in west central Indiana (Lafayette, West Lafayette, and Bloomington). This acquisition was significant since it was the first time Jewel maintained the new acquisition as a separate division within the Jewel organization with the acquired stores keeping their original names, setting the pattern for future acquisitions.

After Jewel's hostile takeover by American Stores in 1984, American Stores decided to save money by merging Eisner directly into Jewel, converting all stores to the Jewel name and slowly started to sell off the former Eisner properties. One of the first properties to let go was the former Eisner warehouse facility in Champaign in 1986. With the Champaign warehouse facility gone, many former Eisner locations became less profitable since they had to be serviced from the more distant Jewel warehouse at Melrose Park, justifying the elimination of those locations. The west central Indiana stores, three in Lafayette and two in Bloomington, were sold off in 1990. Jewel also closed central Illinois locations that were formerly Eisner in Decatur (in 1995), Champaign-Urbana (in 1998), and Springfield (2006).

=== Non-food retail expansion ===
In 1961, Jewel acquired two growing non-food related retail chains, Chicago-based Osco Drug stores, and Brighton, Massachusetts-based Turn Style discount department stores, to complement their food store division when building one-stop shopping destinations, such as the new Family Centers and Jewel-Osco (Eisner-Osco, Star-Osco, Buttrey-Osco) food-drug combinations. The acquisition of both Osco and Turn Style allowed Jewel to expand into non-food related retailing that would complement their existing food retailing business and also to expand the geographic range of its main food distribution business since the non-food companies had a different geographical footprint.

Jewel expanded into the home improvement retail market by acquiring Republic Lumber in 1972.

=== 1960s–1970s expansion ===
During the 1960s, Jewel expanded by acquiring several chains.

Jewel expanded their food store holdings by acquiring Cambridge, Massachusetts-based Star Market in 1964 and the Great Falls, Montana-based Buttrey Food Stores in 1966 to add to their existing Jewel and Eisner food store chains.

The acquisition of Star Market also gave Jewel control of Brigham's Ice Cream, which had been a part of Star since 1961. Jewel later sold off Brigham's in 1982.

In 1965, Jewel expanded into the convenience store business by opening Kwik Shoppe, a chain that was quickly renamed White Hen Pantry within a few months.

Before 1970 Jewel stores were typically located on arterial city streets. Between 1970 and 1990, Jewel moved or expanded most of its stores to be freestanding buildings with ample parking. Throughout the 1960s and 1970s, Jewel built and operated many Jewel-Osco side-by-side stores, but most construction after 1983 consolidated Jewel and Osco stores together as one large store under one roof. Today, the two stores present to the customer as one unit. For instance, a customer can check out any items at Jewel or Osco registers, find Jewel and Osco merchandise commingled throughout the store, and can call one telephone number to reach their Jewel-Osco. Each operating unit retains its own public identity as a "food store" or a "drug store".

The first Jewel-Osco food-drug combination stores were built in 1962. The first Jewel-Osco Family Center was opened in Chicago's Appleton Plaza Shopping center in January 1962.

Jewel opened five stores in Michigan in the 1970s, but closed all five in 1996.

In 1971, Jewel expanded their brand into Wisconsin by acquiring eight failing stores from Kroger and rebranded the stores Jewel. After a decade of operations, Jewel closed all their stores in Wisconsin in 1980. Those locations were sold to Sentry Foods. Jewel did not return to Wisconsin until 1995.

Until 2010, Jewel and Osco stores under the same roof have had separate operations, managers, ordering and receiving procedures, budgets and employees. A 2010 cost-saving measure brought both Jewel and Osco oversight under one store director for each site.

In 1978, Jewel Companies, Inc. attempted to acquire Skaggs Companies, Inc. through an exchange in stock in which Jewel would have been the surviving company and still based in Melrose Park instead of Salt Lake City. A few months later, Skaggs turned down the merger offer. At that time, Skaggs had 229 stores.

After six years, Jewel suffered many losses due to failed marketing concepts and general mismanagement while Skaggs became larger and strong enough to perform a hostile take over of Jewel under its new name: American Stores.

=== American Stores ===
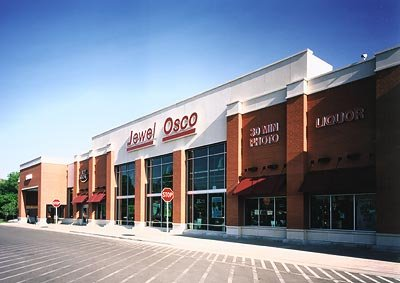
A current Jewel-Osco combo store in Chicago, Illinois, in May 2007 (Store #3349)

American Stores made an offer to acquire the Jewel Companies in 1984. The Jewel Companies, Inc. chairman Weston Christopherson was opposed to a merger and Sam Skaggs subsequently engineered a hostile takeover. On June 1, 1984, American Stores tendered an offer worth $1.1 billion for 67% of Jewel's outstanding shares at $70 per share.

For two weeks, Jewel's management refused to comment on the offer, maintaining its silence even at a stormy shareholder's meeting before which Jewel shareholder groups controlling 20% of the company's stock were in favor of negotiating with American Stores. On June 14, Sam Skaggs and Jewel president Richard Cline reached an agreement after an all-night bargaining session. American Stores raised its bid for Jewel's preferred stock, increasing the total bid to $1.15 billion in cash and securities. In return, Jewel dropped plans for a defensive acquisition of Household International Inc. (parent company of California supermarket chain Vons) and accepted American Stores' offer. American Stores soon sold Buttrey Food Stores (in 1990), Star Market (in 1994), and White Hen Pantry (in 1985), to pay off debt and for other reasons.

==== 1990s expansion under American Stores ====
In 1989, American Stores expanded to Florida using the Jewel-Osco name, but operating as a separate division distinct from the Midwestern Jewel-Osco operations. The Jewel name returned to Florida five years after the company closed all of its Jewel-T discount food stores in 1984. Florida was considered a good market for Jewel because of the high number of Chicagoans who had relocated to that state. After three years of operations, American Stores closed those Jewel-Osco stores and sold them to Albertsons in 1992.

To consolidate the names of some of its subsidiaries under one title with nationwide recognition, American Stores renamed some of its Skaggs-Alpha Beta stores to Jewel-Osco in mid-September 1991. American replaced the Skaggs-Alpha Beta name with that of Jewel-Osco on all 76 stores in Texas, Oklahoma, New Mexico, and Arkansas, expanding the chain toward the southwestern states. Within six months, American Stores sold all of the Jewel-Osco locations in the states of Texas, Oklahoma, Arkansas and Florida to Albertsons but kept the locations in the state of New Mexico for a few more years.

In 1998, American Stores rebranded the Jewel-Osco stores in New Mexico to Lucky/Sav-on, a grocery store/drug store brand which American Stores had used in neighboring Arizona. After the acquisition of American Stores by Albertsons just a few months later, the New Mexico stores were rebranded again to Albertsons Sav-on in 1999.

Under American Stores, Jewel returned to Wisconsin by opening a Jewel-Osco store in a new shopping center in Kenosha, Wisconsin in 1995. Jewel returned to Milwaukee in 1998 by purchasing a Pick 'n Save store and four Cub Foods stores and converting them into Jewel Osco stores.

=== Albertsons and SuperValu ===
Albertsons acquired American Stores' holdings, including Jewel and Jewel-Osco stores, in 1999.

Seven years later, parent company Albertsons and its stores would be taken over by two separate groups. On May 30, 2006, shareholders approved the break-up of Albertsons. All Jewel-Osco and Jewel Food Stores outside of Springfield, Illinois were sold to SuperValu. Two Springfield stores were acquired by an investment group led by Cerberus Capital Management, which were then sold to Niemann Foods. All free-standing Osco drugstores were acquired by CVS Pharmacy. The Osco name is still used for pharmacies within Albertsons, Jewel, Shaw's and Star Market.

SuperValu announced on January 5, 2007, that it would offer for sale its Jewel-Osco stores in the Milwaukee area. Pick 'n Save agreed to take 5 of the 15 stores. Two other stores were purchased by Lena's Food Market. SuperValu announced to its workers that the remaining stores, if unsold, would close at the end of March.

In 2008, the headquarters for the Illinois-based Jewel-Osco division was moved from Melrose Park to Itasca.

=== Jewel Express ===
In 1997, Albertsons added gas pumps and a small convenience store in front of a store in Eagle, Idaho. Since the experiment was successful, Albertsons decided to expand this concept to all stores that would be able to support it and was allowed by local government. The new concept was called Albertsons Express.

After Albertsons acquired American Stores in 1999, Albertsons wanted to expand the Albertsons Express concept to the former American Stores chains. The first Jewel Express was opened in front of a Jewel-Osco in South Elgin in October 2000.

In attempt to increase revenue in 2009, Supervalu enhanced the Express concept by enlarging the convenience store, added more marketing tie ins with the main store and added a car wash. This change did not help Supervalu's bottom line so in 2011 Supervalu announced that it was exiting the fuel business and that it would sell or close all fuel stations that it received when it purchased Albertsons which includes the 29 Jewel Express stations that it received. The same announcement said that 27 of the Jewel Express locations would be sold to Alimentation Couche-Tard, the parent of Circle K, and all remaining unsold locations would be closed. Some of these new Circle K locations were paired with the Shell fuel brand.

Not all Jewel Express locations closed or converted to Circle K. Two Expresses, one in East Moline, Illinois and the other in Moline, Illinois continue with the Jewel Express concept.

=== Urban Fresh ===
In 2008, SuperValu converted one of its closed Sunflower Market stores on Clybourn Avenue to an Urban Fresh by Jewel, a smaller store than the usual Jewel, with more upscale and organic products. This store closed on October 31, 2009, and no other stores were opened under this banner.

=== LEED certified ===
In October 2008, Jewel-Osco opened its first LEED certified store at Kinzie and Des Plaines in Chicago. This new store was built with recycled materials and recycled 98% of its construction debris. It featured a rooftop garden, used water-saving devices, had non-ozone-depleting refrigerants in cooling equipment, used a refrigerant detection system, and had energy efficient lighting.

=== Today ===
Jewel-Osco locations in purple, ACME in red, Shaw's in orange, and Albertsons in blue (1995–2007)

Jewel-Osco employs more than 45,000 associates. Its customer base gave it a 45% share of the grocery market in Chicago, trailed by the Safeway Inc.-owned Dominick's chain (ranking second at 15 percent) before its closure. Consumers from 80% of all households in the Chicago metropolitan area visit a Jewel-Osco store at least once a month.

On January 10, 2013, SuperValu announced the sale of Jewel food stores to Cerberus Capital Management in a $3.3 billion deal. The deal closed on March 21, 2013.

=== Acquisition of Strack & Van Til ===
On May 15, 2017, Jewel-Osco made a bid to purchase all 19 Strack & Van Til grocery stores for $100 million. The Jewel-Osco bid was ultimately unsuccessful and the stores were sold in the bankruptcy auction to the Strack and Van Til families and the Indiana Grocery Group.

== Past ventures ==
Over the years, Jewel has tried other concepts. It is credited with selling the first generic brand product line in 1977. The packaging had no name or pictures—just a list of contents, UPC, and required nutritional information on a white package with a pseudo-army olive-green stripe. The generic line was given the brand "Econo Buy" in the early 1990s.

=== Jewel Grand Bazaar ===
In 1973, Jewel Companies opened an experimental Jewel Grand Bazaar, on the southwest side of Chicago; a store that encompassed an entire city block at the northwest corner of 54th Street and Pulaski Road. This store featured bulk packaging, free samples on weekends, and 24-hour service. See photos: photos This experimental store was in service from 1973 until the 1980s, when it was reformatted as a standard Jewel-Osco combo store. A second Grand Bazaar was opened in 1974 at 87 W. 87th St in Chicago and in 1977, a "Jewel Grand Bazaar" was opened at 6505 W. Diversey in the Brickyard Mall. A fourth location was opened in Franklin Park in 1975.

During the 1990s, the Diversey Avenue Grand Bazaar was reformatted to a regular Jewel grocery store, but continued to carry some of the traditional "Grand Bazaar" features such as bulk foods. With the reconstruction of the Brickyard Mall in 2003, the Grand Bazaar store was demolished and replaced with a smaller Jewel grocery store. Rockford, Illinois also had a Jewel Grand Bazaar that opened in 1976 and was converted to a non-union Magna store in 1983. That store closed in 1997. There was also one on Grand Ave. and Kostner Ave. on Chicago's West side. The last "Grand Bazaar" format store was opened in 1975 at Grand ave. and Mannheim road in Franklin Park, Illinois. This building is currently being operated as a Jewel-Osco. Neither the Chicago Tribune nor the Chicago Sun-Times record when these stores were actually converted or closed.

=== Turn Style ===
In 1961, Jewel Companies (then Jewel Tea) acquired a chain of discount stores in the Chicago area called Turn Style. This chain was moderately successful throughout the 1960s. Some locations were combined with Jewel's supermarket brands to form Family Centers. The first Turn Style Family Center was opened in Racine in March 1962. In 1978, 19 of 22 locations were sold to May Department Stores and converted to the Venture format. Other stores were converted into large Osco Drug Stores.

=== Jewel T ===
In the late 1970s and early 1980s, Jewel Companies operated a no-frills grocery chain called Jewel T (phonetically pronounced "Jewel Tea", as a nod to the former name of the company). The typical store tends to be rather small, 8,000 square feet instead of the typical 30,000 for a full-service supermarket, with a selection rather limited to canned and dry foods and non-perishable with everything sold at a steep discount.

To avoid cannibalizing sales from their existing markets in the Midwest and North East Atlantic States, the first Jewel T location was opened in New Port Richey, Florida, in 1977, quickly followed by 2 other stores in the St. Petersburg area during the same year. Jewel T expanded into Pennsylvania in 1978 and many suburban Philadelphia kids in this gas crisis era remember mom driving the Vega or Pinto out to Jewel T, and bringing back powdered milk, frozen pretzels, and bulk frozen cherry pielettes. They expanded to Atlanta in 1979. Jewel T had approximately 30 stores in two states at the beginning of 1979 and 44 stores in four states by the following June.

By the end of 1979, Jewel T had 87 stores located in the states of Florida, Georgia, Texas, Pennsylvania, Delaware, New Jersey, Tennessee, and Alabama. In the first month of 1980, Jewel T opened eight stores in highly competitive Southern California. In 1981, Jewel T opened stores in Atlanta and its 150th store in Louisiana.

At its height in 1981, Jewel T operated 150 stores in 10 states located mainly in the Mid-Atlantic, South East, the Gulf Coast, the Deep South and Southern California. At the same time it encountered problems competing against the full service supermarkets which fought back by dropping prices, in some cases at or below costs, on the same limited items that Jewel T and other discount food stores specialized in stocking. Within a few years, the company began to sell unprofitable locations. By the beginning of 1984, approximately 131 locations remained.

In March 1984, the company closed all 21 Jewel T stores in Southern California. Seven of the leases and most of the inventory was sold to the 99 Cents Only Stores.

A few months later, 105 stores remained when the chain was finally sold off in two separate transactions in June 1984, 28 stores in Texas were sold to a group of managers while the other 77 stores in Florida, Georgia, Pennsylvania, and New Jersey were sold to Save-A-Lot.

=== Republic Lumber ===
Jewel Companies expanded into the hardware and home improvement business by acquiring Republic Lumber in 1972. In 1979, Jewel, under the Osco division, sold four of its five Republic Lumber locations to R & L Lumber, parent company of Handy Andy Home Improvement Center, and closed the fifth. They were located on the west side of Chicago at 4052 W. Grand Ave (a former Jewel opened in 1957 to celebrate the chain's 25th anniversary), Oak Lawn, Arlington Heights and Chicago Heights. A fifth location in Norridge was closed early in 1979 when the lease was not renewed, which later became a Joseph Lumber location.

== President's Choice house brand ==
While as a subsidiary division of American Stores, Jewel-Osco began offering the Canadian staple President's Choice branded products in 1992. President's Choice is a house brand created and distributed by Loblaw Companies Limited of Toronto, Ontario. Loblaw makes extra money by offering their President's Choice to other retailers who do not compete in their home marketing areas. Under American Stores' marketing agreement with Loblaw, American Stores were the exclusive distributor of the President's Choice brand within each American Stores, marketing area. The marketing agreement between Jewel and Loblaw ceased when Albertsons acquired American Stores. In 2011, Supervalu replaced the house brand at Jewel with their own Culinary Circle and Wild Harvest private label brands.

== Organizational philosophy ==
A 1972 book written by Jewel senior leaders, The Jewel Concepts, stressed good citizenship within the community, "watching the horizon", and sponsorship of young people.

In an Illinois Retail Merchants Association online article, retired Jewel-Osco chairman Don Perkins reflects, "Jewel has a tradition of people orientation." One of these traditions came in the form of the "first assistant" philosophy of management. Each higher-level manager was to see himself or herself as serving the employees he or she managed. On the store level, this would mean that the manager would be the "first assistant" to the employees by making personal contact and taking personal interest, solving problems, suggesting solutions, and using flexibility in order to best serve the employees' concerns. Then the floor employees' duty was to be in service as the "first assistant" to the customers.

Jewel also was progressive in creating partnerships with vendors, at a time when the practice was rare.

== Stores ==
- Albertsons LLC owns these Jewel-Osco stores:
  - Jewel-Osco and Jewel stores (168 stores), located in Chicago metro area, including northwestern Indiana.
  - Jewel-Osco and Jewel stores (10 stores), located in Central and Western Illinois and Clinton, Iowa.

=== Former stores ===
- These former Jewel-Osco or Jewel stores were acquired by Niemann Foods and were rebranded as County Market
  - Jewel-Osco (2 stores) located in Springfield, Illinois (originally acquired by Cerberus).
- All freestanding Osco drugstores (90 stores in Indiana, Illinois, Missouri, Kansas and Wisconsin) were sold to CVS and rebranded as CVS/pharmacy.
- The two locations in southern Wisconsin, located just north of the border in Kenosha and Racine, have both closed.

== See also ==
- Buttrey Food Stores
- Eisner Food Stores
- Osco Drug
- Star Market
- Turn Style
- White Hen Pantry
