= Preservation Chicago =

U.S. non-profit organization

- Formation: October 23, 2001
- Headquarters: Chicago, Illinois, US
- Website: preservationchicago.org

Preservation Chicago is a historic preservation advocacy group in Chicago, Illinois, which formally commenced operations on October 23, 2001. The organization was formed by a group of Chicagoans who had assembled the previous year to save a group of buildings which included Coe Mansion, which had once housed Ranalli's pizzeria and The Red Carpet, a French restaurant that had been frequented by Jack Benny and Elizabeth Taylor. Other preservation campaigns that were instrumental in the founding of Preservation Chicago included St. Boniface Church, the Scherer Building, and the New York Life Insurance Building.

== Advocacy ==
=== 2000s ===
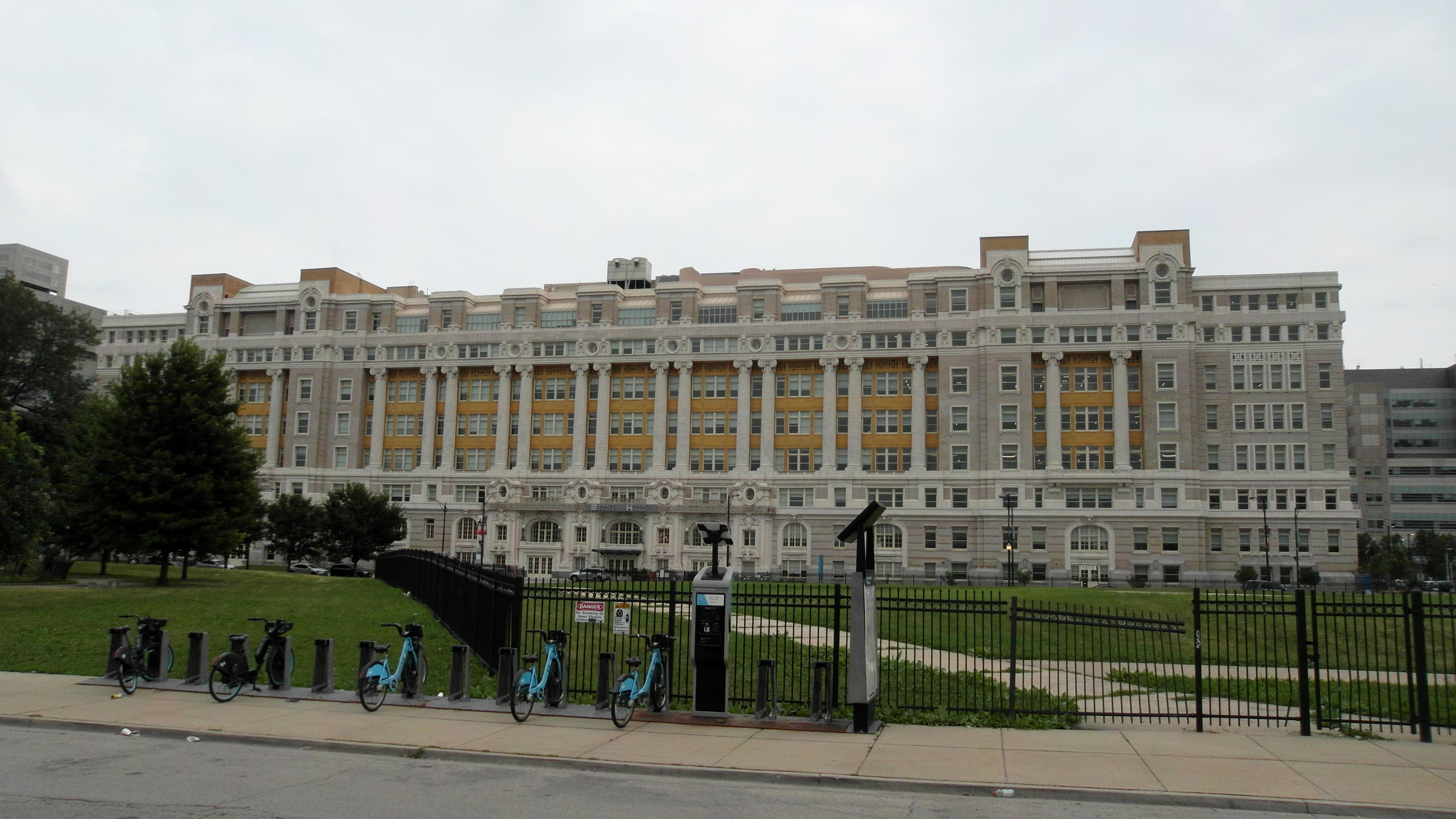
The Old Cook County Hospital Building in 2022

One of Preservation Chicago's first campaigns was the fight against the demolition of the old Chicago Mercantile Exchange Building. Ultimately demolished in 2003, its demolition has been ranked one of the city's most senseless demolitions, and the public outcry that followed led the city to adopt the 90 day demolition delay for certain historic and architecturally significant buildings that do not have landmark protection. The site of the old Chicago Mercantile Exchange Building has remained vacant.

In October 2002, Preservation Chicago released its first "Chicago 7" list of the city's seven most endangered historic places, which included the old Chicago Mercantile Exchange building, the Cook County Hospital Building, the Metropolitan Community Church, the New York Life Insurance Building, St. Boniface Church, and the Lower River North Historic District.

Preservation Chicago led the fight to save the Cook County Hospital Building after the county announced its intent to close the hospital and demolish it at a cost of $30 million. The building has since been restored and reopened in 2020 as a mixed use development featuring a Hyatt Hotel along with a food hall and commercial and office space.

Preservation Chicago advocated for the preservation of the last remaining Magikist neon sign, and was weeks away from naming it as one of the seven most endangered historic places in the city when the sign was abruptly torn down in late 2003.

In November 2003, the organization released their second "Chicago 7" list, which included the Cook County Hospital Building, Prentice Women's Hospital, the Isabella Building, the South Side Masonic Temple, the West Loop Mercantile District, the East Village neighborhood, and religious structures throughout the city. One religious building that Preservation Chicago has long fought to save is St. Gelasius Church in Woodlawn. In 2003, the archdiocese was preparing to demolish the church, but a nun successfully stalled the demolition when she refused to allow contractors into an adjacent building to shut off power to the church.

In January 2005, the organization's third "Chicago 7" list was released, which included Lincoln Park's Sheffield Historic District, Chicago-School Factories and Warehouses, the Illinois Charitable Eye and Ear Infirmary, the Goodman Theatre, the Hotel Dana, Jacob Riis Public School, and 444 N. LaSalle Drive.

Preservation Chicago's fourth annual Chicago 7 list included the Interior Furniture Building, the Pilsen neighborhood, 59th and Halsted and other endangered historic intersections, Promontory Point, the New York Life Insurance Building, Wrigley Field Rooftops, and the Hayes-Healy Center.

Preservation Chicago successfully advocated for Roberts Temple Church of God in Christ, where Emmett Till's funeral was held, to be granted landmark status. The church was granted landmark status in 2007.

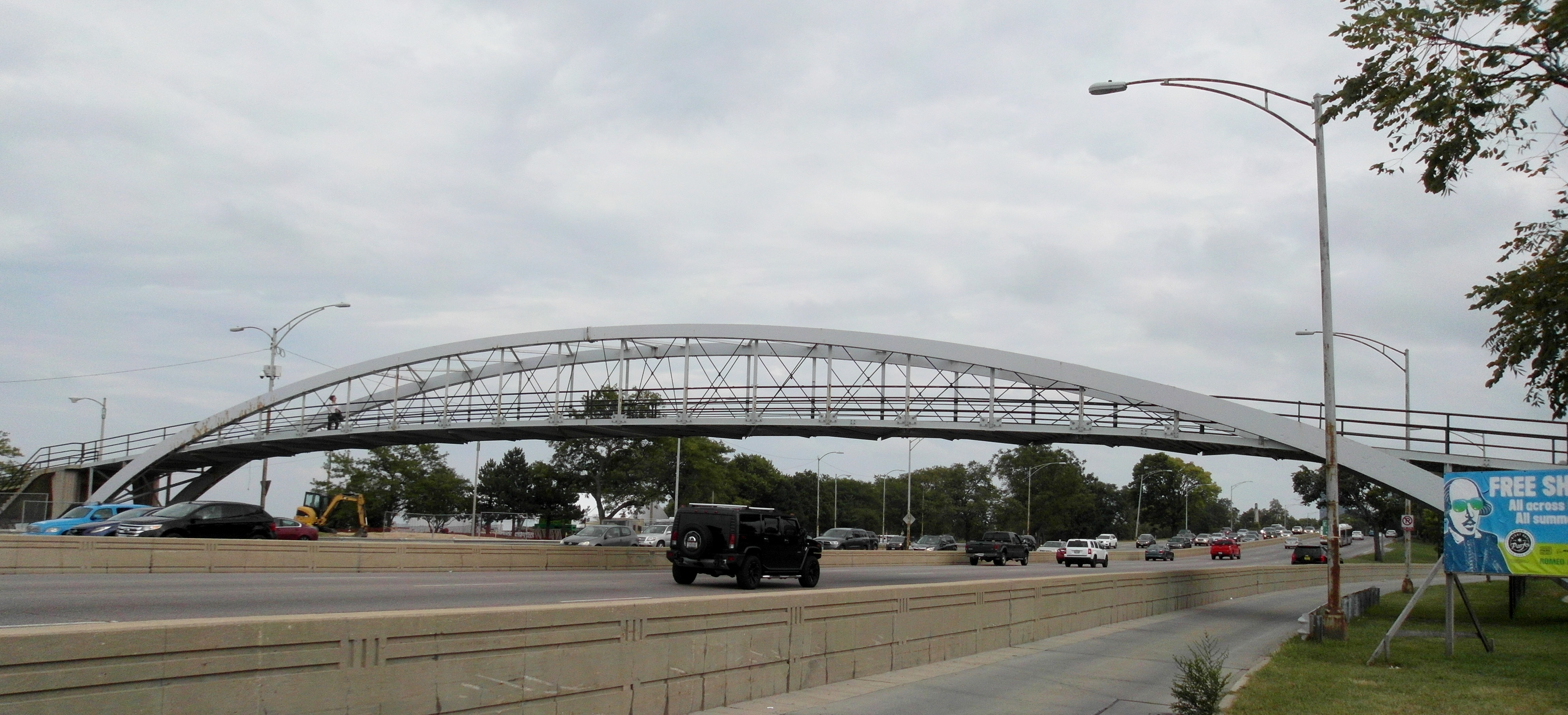
North Avenue Pedestrian Bridge

2007's Chicago 7 list included Pilgrim Baptist Church, the North Avenue Pedestrian Bridge, the Rosenwald Apartments, the Archer Avenue District, the Milwaukee Avenue Commercial District, the Julia C. Lathrop Homes, and the Farwell Building. Pilgrim Baptist Church, which was designed by Adler & Sullivan and was originally a synagogue, suffered a fire the previous year, which only left the outer walls standing. Two other Louis Sullivan designed buildings, the Wirt Dexter Building and the George Harvey House, were also lost to fire in 2006. Preservation Chicago has advocated for the restoration of Pilgrim Baptist Church, including after wind caused the collapse of one of the remaining walls in 2020.

2008's Chicago 7 included the Booker Building, the Chicago Daily News Building, Old Norwood Park, the city's landmarks ordinance, the American Book Company Building, the Devon Avenue District, and Grant Park. The landmarks ordinance was included due to the city's decision to allow the demolition of the landmarked Farwell Building (with the facade of the demolished building removed and reassembled on the new structure), as well as other landmarked buildings that the city allowed to be demolished or radically altered. Grant Park was threatened by a plan to build the Chicago Children's Museum. The museum was ultimately located on Navy Pier.

The following year's Chicago 7 included the Chicago Motor Club, Meigs Field Terminal, old-fashioned wood windows, buildings of the Michael Reese Hospital campus, St Boniface Church, and the Richard Nickel House.

=== 2010s ===
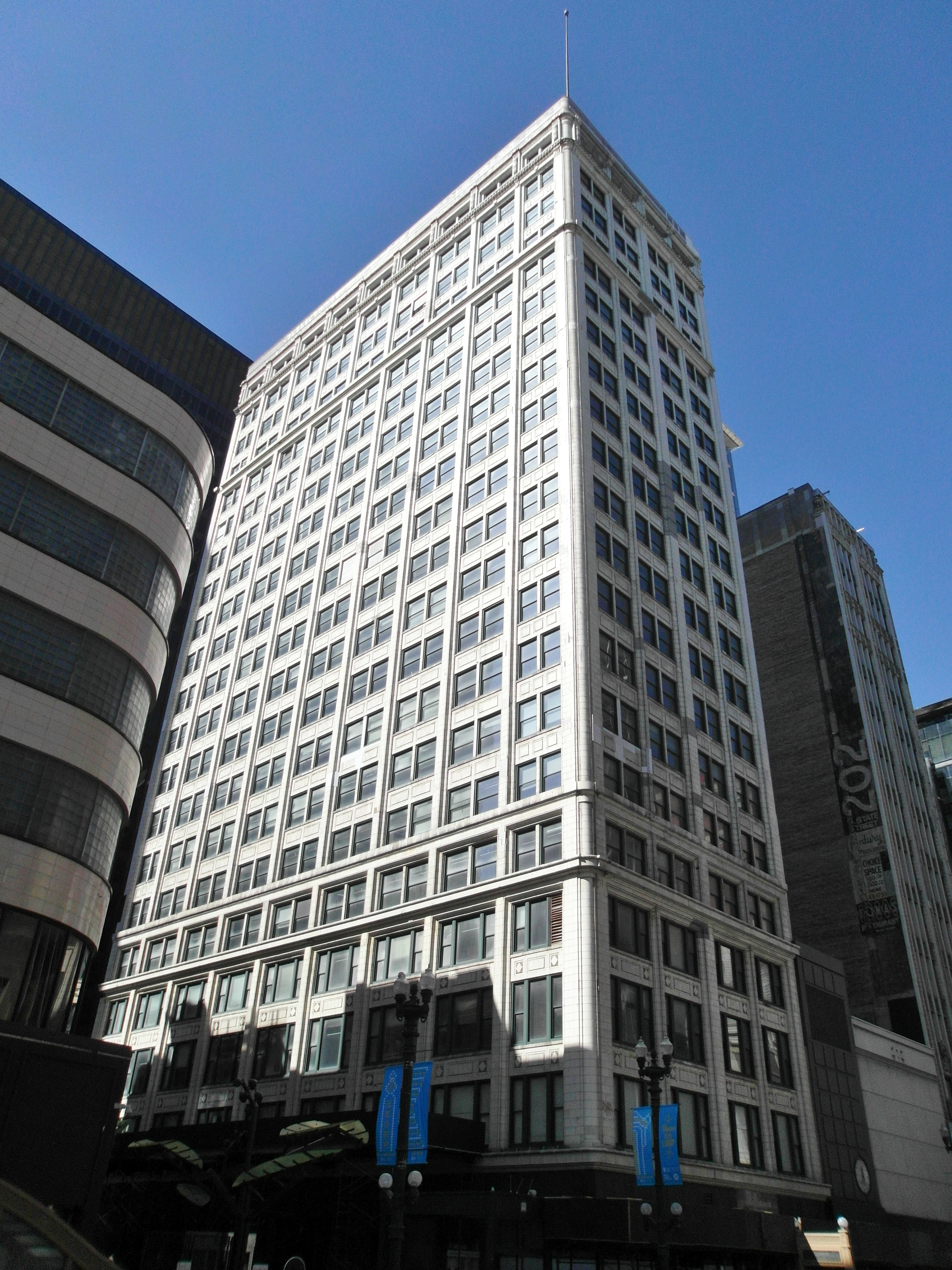
The Consumers Building

2010's Chicago 7 Most Endangered featured a look back at seven years of Chicago, featuring seven tragedies, seven tribulations, and seven triumphs.

2011's Chicago 7 included the Century & Consumers Buildings, Shepherd's Temple Baptist Church (originally Anshe Kanesses Israel synagogue), Chicago Theological Seminary, St. Laurence Church, Pullman Historic District, Children's Memorial Hospital, and Prentice Hospital.

2012's Chicago 7 included Chicago movie theaters, Unity Hall, Woodlawn Avenue, St. Anthony's Hospital, Cuneo Hospital, Gethsemane Church, and Prentice Hospital.

The following year's Chicago 7 included the Allstate Building, the Century & Consumers Buildings, St. James Church, State Bank of Clearing, Lathrop Homes, Medic Building, and the Guyon Hotel.

The 2014 Chicago 7 included the Central Manufacturing District, St. Adalbert Catholic Church, the Jeffery Theater, Francis Scott Key Public School, Madison/Wabash Station House, the Guyon Hotel, and the Crawford and Fisk power houses.

The 2015 Chicago 7 included A. Finkl & Sons Steel, the Pioneer Arcade & New Apollo Theater buildings, the Illinois Institute of Technology's Main Building, the Clarendon Park Community Center, the city's neon signs, the South Side Masonic Temple, and the Agudas Achim Synagogue.

The 2016 Chicago 7 included the Washington Park National Bank Building, CMH Pavilions, Old Chinatown, the city's historic Sears stores, McCormick Place's Lakeside Center, St. Adalbert Catholic Church, "L" Stations, and the Thompson Center. Preservation Chicago continued to advocate for the remaining historic Sears stores in the city, and for them to be considered for landmark status, after the last remaining Sears store closed in the city in 2018.

The 2017 Chicago 7 Most Endangered included the Chicago Union Station Power House, Altgeld Gardens, Blocks 11, 12 and 13, Chicago's 20th Century Public Sculptures, the Cornell Store & Flats, Chicago Water Cribs, Madison-Pulaski District, and Jackson Park & South Shore Cultural Center.

The 2018 Chicago 7 Most Endangered included Jackson Park, Midway Plaisance, & South Shore Cultural Center, the James R. Thompson Center, William Rainey Harper High School, Washington Park Substation / Gaitan Building, brick paved streets and alleys, the Woodruff Arcade Building, the Guyon Hotel, and Chicago Union Station.

The 2019 Chicago 7 Most Endangered included Jackson Park, South Shore Cultural Center & Midway Plaisance, the Laramie State Bank Building, the Seven Continents Building / O'Hare Rotunda Building, Loretto Academy, Crawford Power Station, Second Church of Christ, Scientist, the Justice D. Harry Hammer Mansion / Lutrelle 'Lu' & Jorja Palmer Mansion, the James R. Thompson Center, and Roman Catholic churches of Chicago.

=== 2020s ===
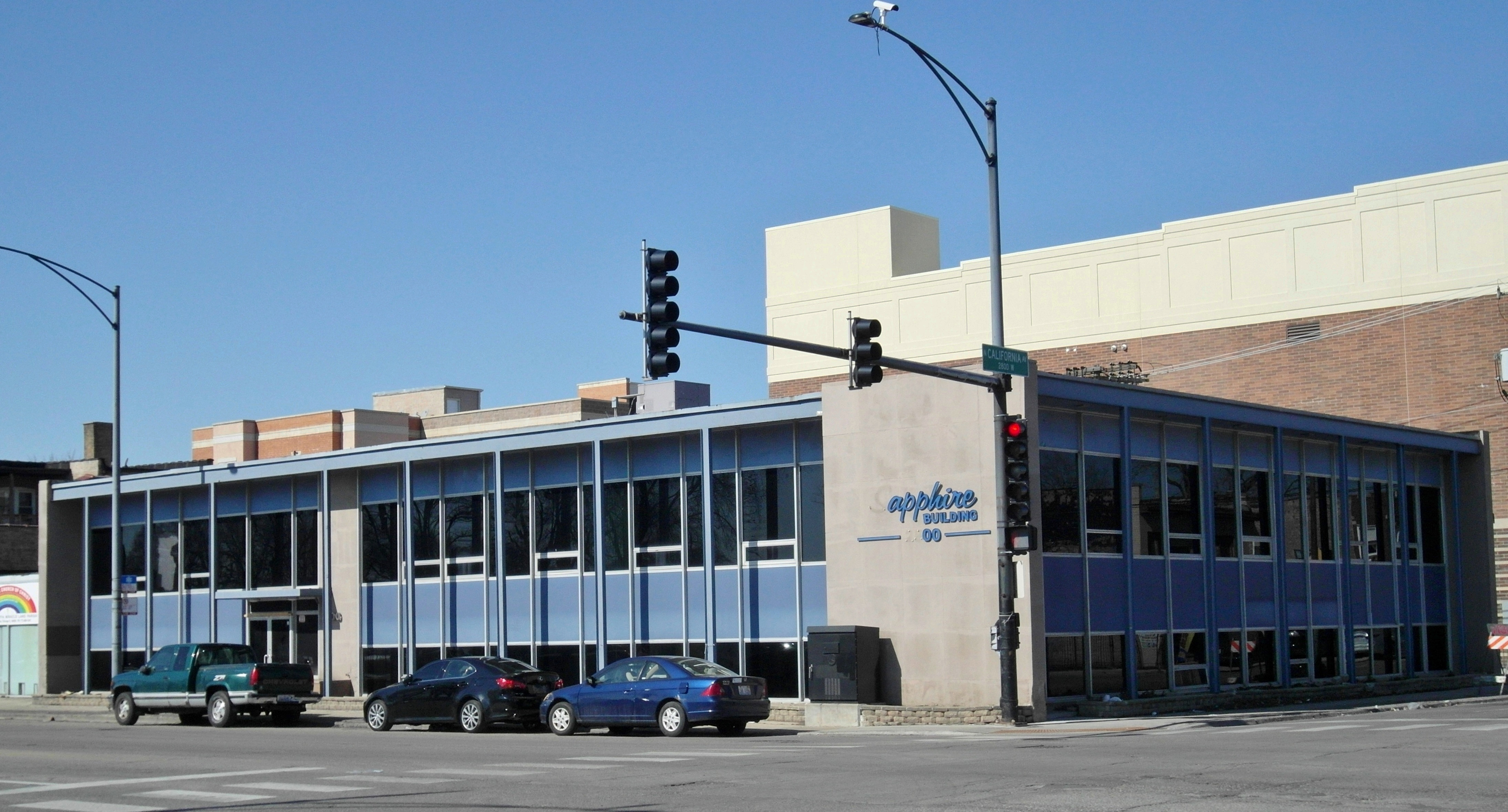
The mid-century modern Sapphire Building, demolished in 2021

The 2020 Chicago 7 Most Endangered included Jackson Park, South Shore Cultural Center & Midway Plaisance, the James R. Thompson Center, the Chicago Town & Tennis Club building, the Chicago Union Station Power House, the Washington Park National Bank Building, Central Manufacturing District – Pershing Road, and the Roseland Michigan Avenue Commercial District.

The 2021 Chicago 7 Most Endangered included the Chicago Lakefront, the last Chicago Phyllis Wheatley Home, the Cornell Store & Flats, the South Chicago Masonic Temple, West Loop industrial lofts, the Central Manufacturing District–Original East Historic District, and Roman Catholic churches.

The 2022 Chicago 7 Most Endangered included the Century & Consumers Buildings, public housing sites, the St. Martin de Tours Church, the Peterson Avenue Midcentury Modern District, Promontory Point, Central Park Theater, North DuSable Lake Shore Drive, and the Moody Triangle. The Century & Consumers Buildings returned to the Chicago 7 after a $52 million federal earmark to demolish the buildings was revealed. Threats to the Peterson Avenue Midcentury Modern District include the demolition of the Sapphire Building and other demolitions of significant mid-century modern buildings, alterations to buildings that destroy the historic integrity, abandonments, and the fact that the district does not enjoy landmark protection and none of its buildings are included in the Chicago Historic Resources Survey.

After the 2022 fire at Antioch Baptist Church, Preservation Chicago has proposed that Chicago pass an ordinance prohibiting the use of propane torches on wooden roofs, similar to an ordinance already in place in New York City. The use of propane torches on wooden roofs has been the cause of many other fires in historic buildings, including the aforementioned Pilgrim Baptist Church fire.
