= Larkin Company Building =

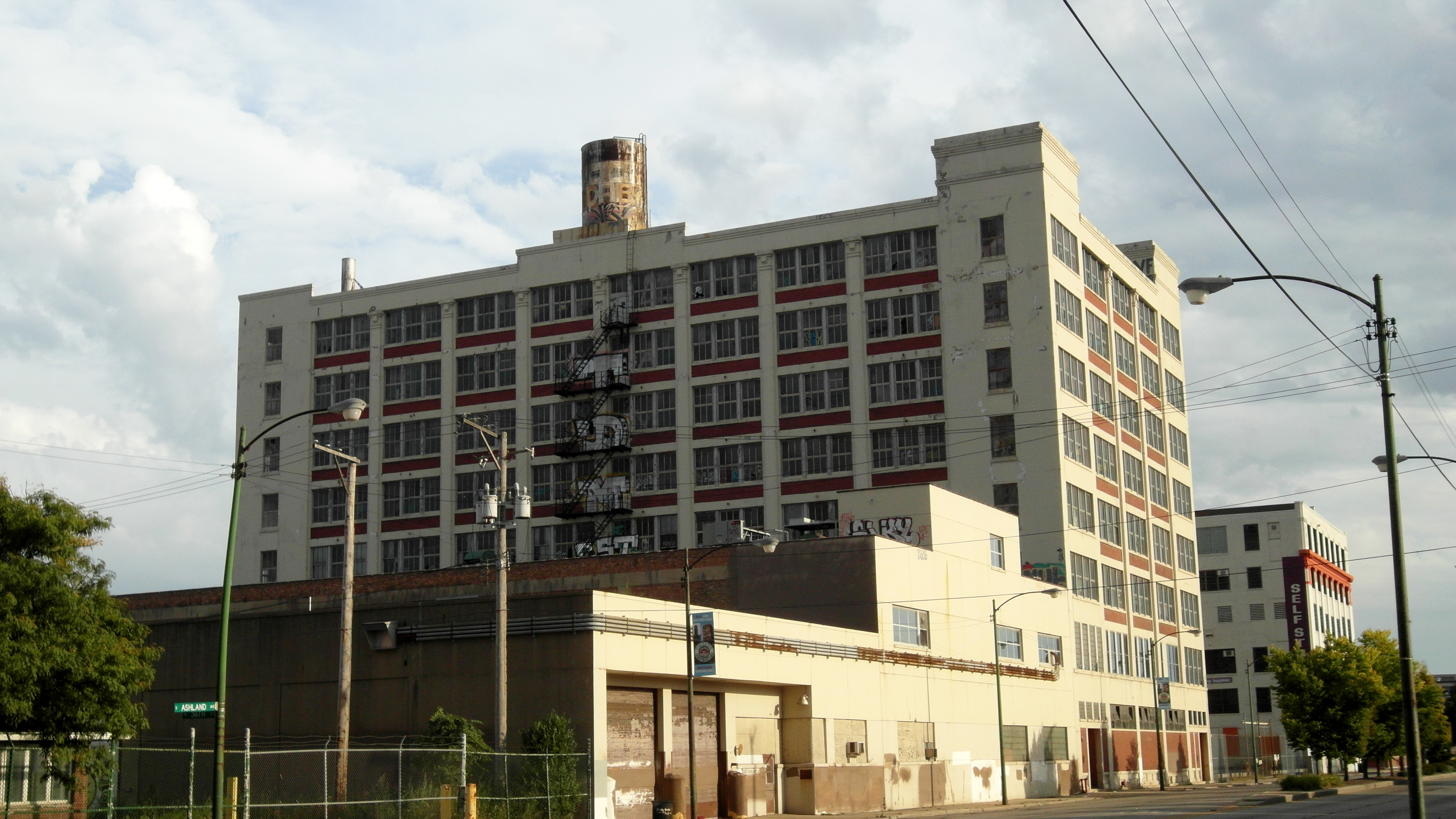
- Interactive map of the Larkin Company Building area

General information
- Architectural style: Classical Revival
- Location: 3617 S. Ashland Avenue, Chicago, Illinois
- Coordinates: 41°49′40.6″N 87°39′53.5″W
- Completed: 1912
- Demolished: December 2020

Technical details
- Floor count: 8

Design and construction
- Architect: F. E. Lockwood

The Larkin Company Building was an eight-story loft building at 3617 S. Ashland Avenue in Chicago's Central Manufacturing District. It was a contributing property to the Central Manufacturing District–Original East Historic District. The building was constructed in 1912 and was demolished in December 2020.

== History ==
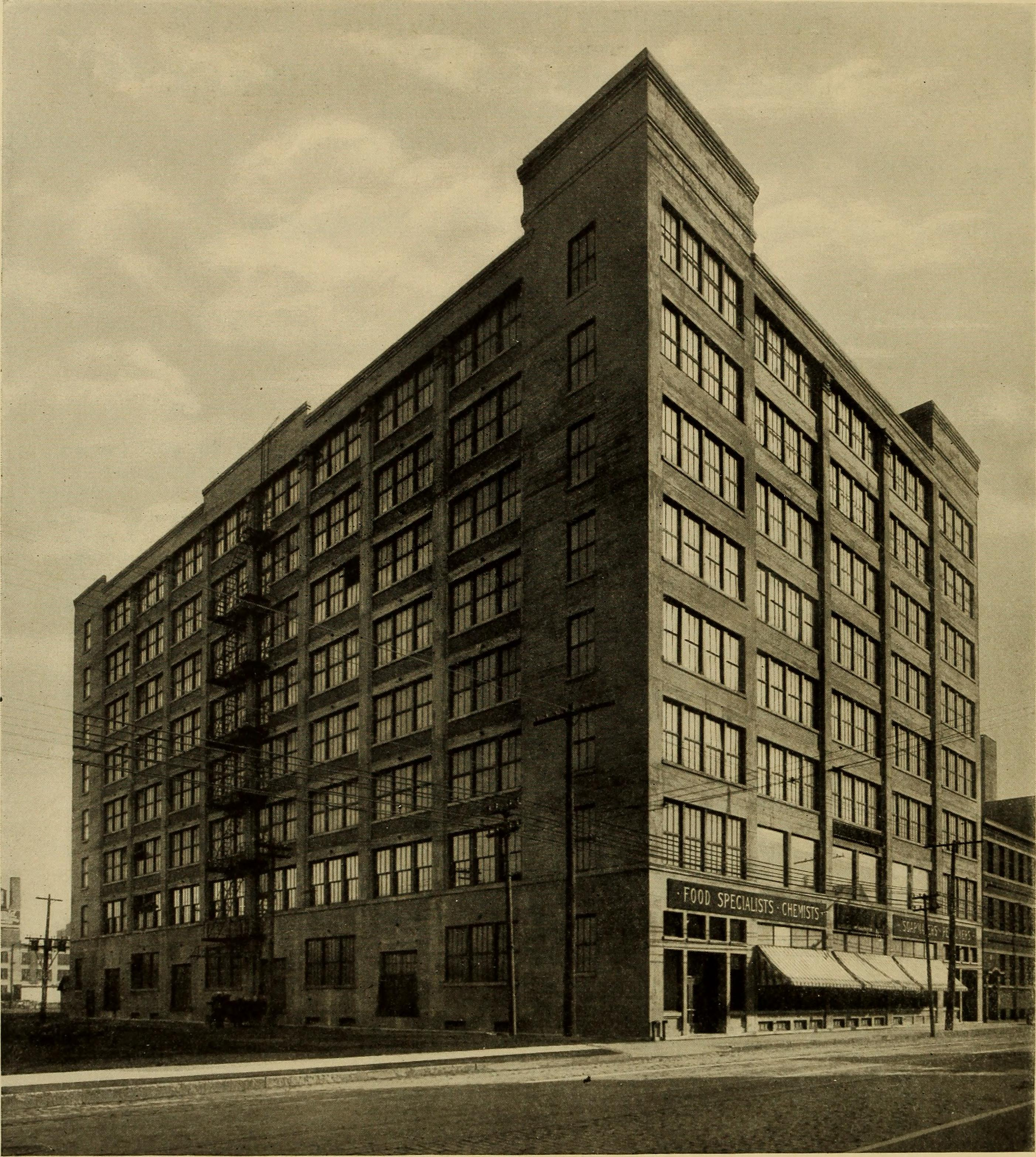
The Larkin Company Building in 1915

The Larkin Company purchased the property in late 1911 for $45,257 and built the building in 1912 at a cost of approximately $500,000. It was designed by F. E. Lockwood and originally housed the Larkin Company's Chicago operations. It also housed the offices and warehouse of the Vassar Swiss Underwear Company from 1913 until 1914, when it moved to its newly built plant at 2545 West Diversey. In the 1920s, the building housed the Midwestern operations of the Hydro-United Tire Company and the Bristol Company, a manufacturer of recording equipment.

By the early 1930s, Jewel Food Stores had offices in the building. The Jewel Tea company purchased the building in 1937 for $432,000. The building served the headquarters of the Jewel Food Stores division, as well as its warehouse. A two-story addition was built in 1948, designed by Carr & Wright. In 1954, much of the company's Chicago and Barrington operations were combined at their new site in Melrose Park, but the building continued to serve Jewel as a distribution warehouse for many years. In 1954, Jewel planned to build a heliport on the roof of the building. The building later housed Wm. Wrigley Jr. Company's Wrico Packaging division. A permit to demolish the building was issued on December 11, 2020.
