= Larkin Building =

Larkin Building may refer to:

- Larkin Company Building, an eight-story building in Chicago, built in 1912 and demolished in 2020
- Larkin Administration Building, a building designed by Frank Lloyd Wright in Buffalo, New York, demolished in 1950
- Larkin Terminal Warehouse, a building in Buffalo, New York, built in 1912
- Larkin–Belber Building, a historic building in the Logan Square neighborhood of Philadelphia
- Larkin Building (New York City), a skyscraper in New York City that was proposed in 1926 but was never built

== See also ==
- Larkin
