= Eisner Food Stores =

Supermarkets chain of Illinois and Indiana, United States

Eisner Food Stores, Inc.
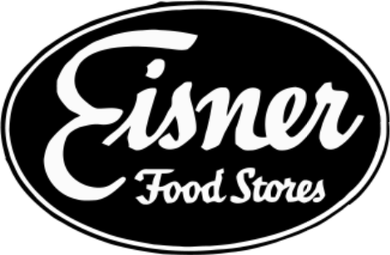
- Type: Subsidiary of The Jewel Companies, Inc.
- Industry: Retail
- Founded: 1901; 125 years ago
- Defunct: 1985; 41 years ago
- Fate: Rebranded as Jewel
- Headquarters: Champaign, Illinois, U.S.
- Area served: Central Illinois and central Indiana
- Products: supermarkets/food-drug stores
- Parent: Jewel (1957–1984); American Stores (1984–1985)
- Subsidiaries: Big E Warehouse Foods

Eisner Food Stores was a chain of supermarkets in Illinois and Indiana. It was acquired by The Jewel Companies, Inc. in 1957. The Eisner stores were rebranded as Jewel in 1985.

== History ==
Albert Eisner Sr. (1851–1926), a Hungarian immigrant, incorporated Eisner Grocery Company in June 1906 in Champaign, Illinois. In 1919, he entered into a franchise agreement with Piggly Wiggly, the first self-serve grocery store, and opened a few Piggly Wiggly locations in Champaign and the surrounding areas. Those stores would later rebrand to Eisner stores when the franchise agreement was ended in 1951 by his son, Albert Eisner Jr. (1885–1980). Eisner Jr. took over after his father's death in 1926, and by the 1950s, Eisner Grocery Company had more than 40 supermarkets in downstate Illinois and Western Indiana.

=== Acquisition by Jewel ===
In 1957, The Jewel Companies, Inc. acquired Eisner Food Stores with its 41 stores in Illinois and Indiana. Eisner continued to be managed from Champaign, Illinois. Within a few years, the Eisner stores began closely resembling Jewel in appearance and marketing strategies.

=== Eisner-Osco Family Centers ===
The first store combination involving an Eisner Food Store and a second involving an Osco Drug store occurred when the first Eisner-Osco Family Center was opened in September 1970 in West Lafayette, Indiana. The two stores were placed side-by-side underneath a single roof and separate by a partial wall while sharing a common entry/exit foyer but having separate check-out areas. This type of store would be later known as a side-by-side partitioned store. Later that year, another Eisner-Osco Family Center was opened in Bloomington, Indiana.

In March 1971, a family center was opened in Decatur, Illinois.

In November 1972, Eisner opened the first two Eisner Food-Osco Drug Family Shopping Centers in Indianapolis. Three more would follow within three years to give Indianapolis a total of five.

==== Combo stores ====
In 1980, Jewel started the construction of what become known as Eisner-Osco Combo stores in which the new stores did not have a partition to physically divide the two stores and that items from both stores might be intermixed on a common sales floor and purchased through a common cash register area. The computers that are attached to the electronic cash registers are used to sort the purchases for the different stores. An Eisner-Osco Combo store was opened in Mattoon in January 1981. In July 1982, an Eisner-Osco combo store was opened in Bloomington, Indiana.

=== Turn-Style/Eisner Family Centers ===
In Indianapolis, Jewel opened three Turn-Style/Eisner Family Centers in late 1970 that combined a Turn Style discount department store with an Eisner Food store under one roof. This concept did not last very long and the three Turn Style stores within each Indianapolis family centers were converted into Osco Drug stores by November 1977.

=== Big E Warehouse Foods ===
In 1976, Eisner created a warehouse store chain called Big E Warehouse Foods which sold food and other items at deep discounts. Most of the warehouse stores were created by converting former Eisner supermarkets. This money-losing experiment did not last very long. In Indianapolis, Eisner sold five out of eight Big E stores to rival Preston-Safeway while closing the remain three stores in 1983.

In at least in one case in which an under-performing Jewel Food store was adjacent to a Turn-Style discount department store, a Big E Warehouse replaced a Jewel store in Racine, Wisconsin, during the same time period.

=== Demise of the Eisner brand ===
In 1984, Eisner's parent, the Jewel Companies was unable to defend itself from a very expensive hostile takeover by American Stores. After the takeover, American Stores decided to save money by merging Eisner directly into Jewel, converting all stores to the Jewel name in 1985, and slowly started to sell off the former Eisner properties. One of the first properties to let go was the former Eisner warehouse facility in Champaign in 1986. With the Champaign warehouse facility gone, many former Eisner locations became less profitable since they had to be serviced from the more distant Jewel warehouse at Melrose Park in northern Illinois, which later justified the elimination of those stores in central Indiana and central Illinois.

In central Indiana stores, the two Jewel Food stores in Bloomington were sold off in January 1990 while the three Jewel stores in Lafayette were closed in May 1994.

Jewel also closed central Illinois locations that were formerly Eisner stores in Mattoon (in 1991), Decatur (in 1995), Champaign-Urbana (in 1998), and Springfield (2006).

== Central Indiana ==
The Eisner Grocery Company had a business presence in Lafayette, Indiana, since May 1925 when the first store was opened in that city as a Piggly Wiggly. By November 1951 when the Eisner Grocery Company were rebranding their Piggly Wiggly stores as Eisner Food Stores, the company had two stores in Lafayette. A new Eisner-Osco Family Center was opened in West Lafayette in September 1970 to join the existing three Eisner stores in the greater Lafayette area.

The company expanded to Bloomington, Indiana, by the opening of an Eisner-Osco Family Center there in November 1970. An Eisner-Osco combo store was opened in Bloomington in July 1982 making it the second Eisner store in Southern Indiana.

The Eisner brand was introduced to the state capital of Indianapolis through the opening of three Turn-Style/Eisner Family Centers in the Fall of 1970. The Eisner brand was expanded into other parts of Indianapolis through the opening of two Eisner-Osco Family Shopping Centers in November 1972, plus a third Eisner-Osco in August 1973, a fourth Eisner-Osco in August 1974, and a fifth Eisner-Osco in April 1975. By the end of 1976, all three Eisner Food stores that were adjacent to the Turn-Style stores in Indianapolis were converted into Big E Warehouse Foods stores and by the end of following year, all three of the Turn-Style stores in Indianapolis were themselves converted into Osco drugstores. By August 1977, the remaining five Eisner Food stores in Indianapolis that were adjacent to Osco drugstores were also converted into Big E Warehouse Foods stores. In 1983, five out of the eight Big E stores in Indianapolis were later sold to rival Preston-Safeway and the remain three stores were closed. 1983 marks the end of Eisner's participation in the Indianapolis-area retail grocery business while still remaining in business in the Indiana cities of Lafayette and Bloomington.

The Eisner brand disappeared from Indiana when the three remaining Eisner stores in Lafayette and the two stores in Bloomington were rebranded to Jewel in May 1985.

== Eisner Park ==
In 1944, the Eisner family donated 4-acres of land to the city of Champaign for use as a park. The park was later renamed Eisner Park in their honor.

== See also ==
- Jewel Food Stores
- Osco Drug
- Turn Style
