= Washington Park National Bank Building =

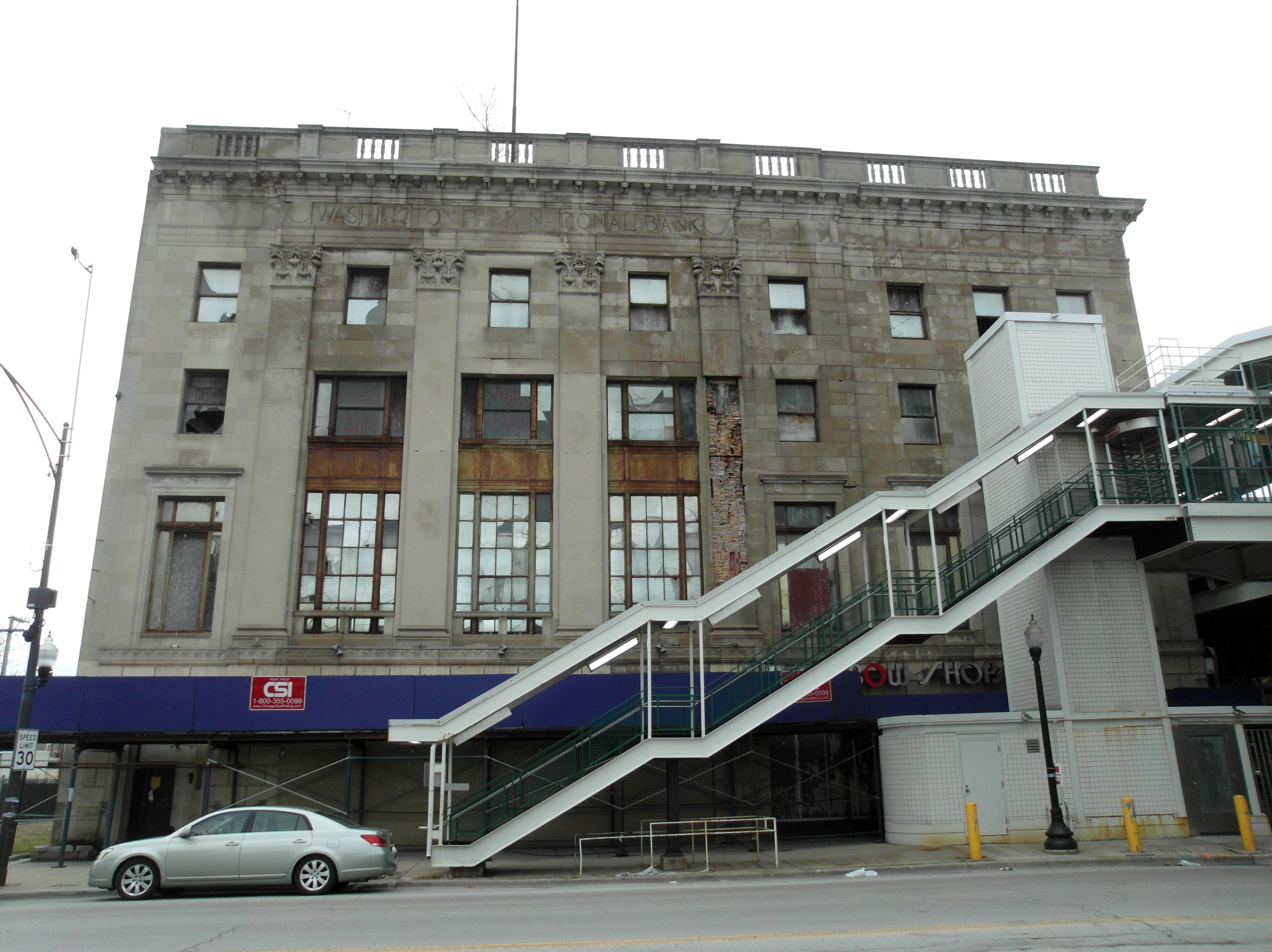

General information
- Architectural style: Neoclassical
- Location: 6300 S. Cottage Grove, Chicago, Illinois
- Coordinates: 41°46′48.7″N 87°36′22.1″W
- Completed: 1924

Technical details
- Floor count: 4

Design and construction
- Architect: Albert A. Schwartz

The Washington Park National Bank Building is a Neoclassical building at 6300 S. Cottage Grove in Chicago's Woodlawn neighborhood. It was designed by Albert A. Schwartz and was completed in 1924. Initial plans, unveiled in 1922, called for a nine story building, designed by Albert A. Schwartz, with work to begin in August 1922. However, these plans were changed, and its present design was later revealed in 1923.

== History ==
In addition to housing the Washington Park National Bank, it had 60 office suites on the third and fourth floors, four shops on the first floor facing 63rd Street, and a Walgreens in the corner store. Walgreens remained in the building for many years. The Washington Park National Bank closed on June 8, 1931. It was later owned by Rev. Leon Finney Jr. and served as the headquarters of The Woodlawn Organization, founded by Saul Alinsky. The Cook County Land Bank Authority took ownership in January 2018.

The building is currently vacant and is threatened with demolition. In March 2019, the Cook County Land Bank Authority announced its intention to sell the building to a joint venture of DL3 Realty and Greenlighting Realty USA, which plans to demolish it. The building was included in Preservation Chicago's list of Chicago's 7 most endangered buildings in 2016 and 2020, and was added to Landmarks Illinois's list of the state's "most endangered historic places" in 2019. In cooperation with Preservation Chicago, architectural firm CallisonRTKL prepared an adaptive reuse plan which allows for the restoration of the existing building, along with a new two-story addition atop the building.
