= New York Life Insurance Building (Chicago) =

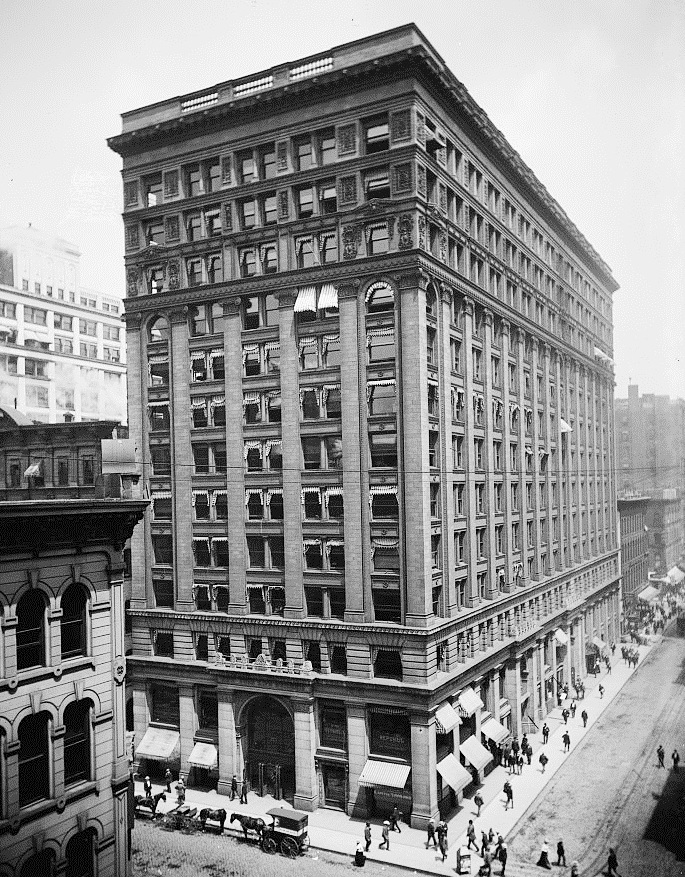
- (1900)
- Interactive map of the New York Life Insurance Building area

General information
- Status: Completed
- Location: Chicago, Illinois
- Coordinates: 41°52′53.2″N 87°37′56.2″W
- Completed: 1894

Technical details
- Floor count: 14

Design and construction
- Architect: William Le Baron Jenney

Chicago Landmark
- Designated: July 26, 2006

The New York Life Insurance Building is a 14-story building at 39 South LaSalle Street in the Loop neighborhood in Chicago, Illinois. Designed by William Le Baron Jenney, it was completed as a 12-story structure in 1894 at a cost of $800,000, equivalent to $29,769,231 in 2025. In 1898, Jenney designed a 92 ft (28 m) addition to the east of the original structure. This expanded the Monroe Street facade to 233 ft (71 m). The addition contained 13 floors and an additional floor was added to the first structure. The expansion also added an entrance on Monroe Street and enlarged the lobby. In 1903, a fourteenth floor was added bring the building to its current height.

The building is faced with brick and terra cotta trim in the classical style. Prior to the additions, a cornice and parapet encircled the top, however these were removed to accommodate the expansion. The lobby retains its Georgia gray marble cladding and mosaic tile floor. Light fixtures are deco and appear to be from the 1920s.

The building received preliminary landmark status in 2002, but in 2006, Preservation Chicago considered the building one of Chicago's most threatened. In June of that year a company submitted an application to the Chicago Plan Commission including plans to renovate the structure and build 29 South LaSalle, an adjacent 51 story office building. Later that month, the building was declared an official Chicago landmark, amended in 2009.

In August 2014, KHP Capital Partners announced it purchased the structure and would convert it to a 293-room Kimpton hotel that will include a rooftop restaurant, meeting rooms, and retail space. The hotel, officially named The Kimpton Gray Hotel, opened in 2016.

== Gallery ==
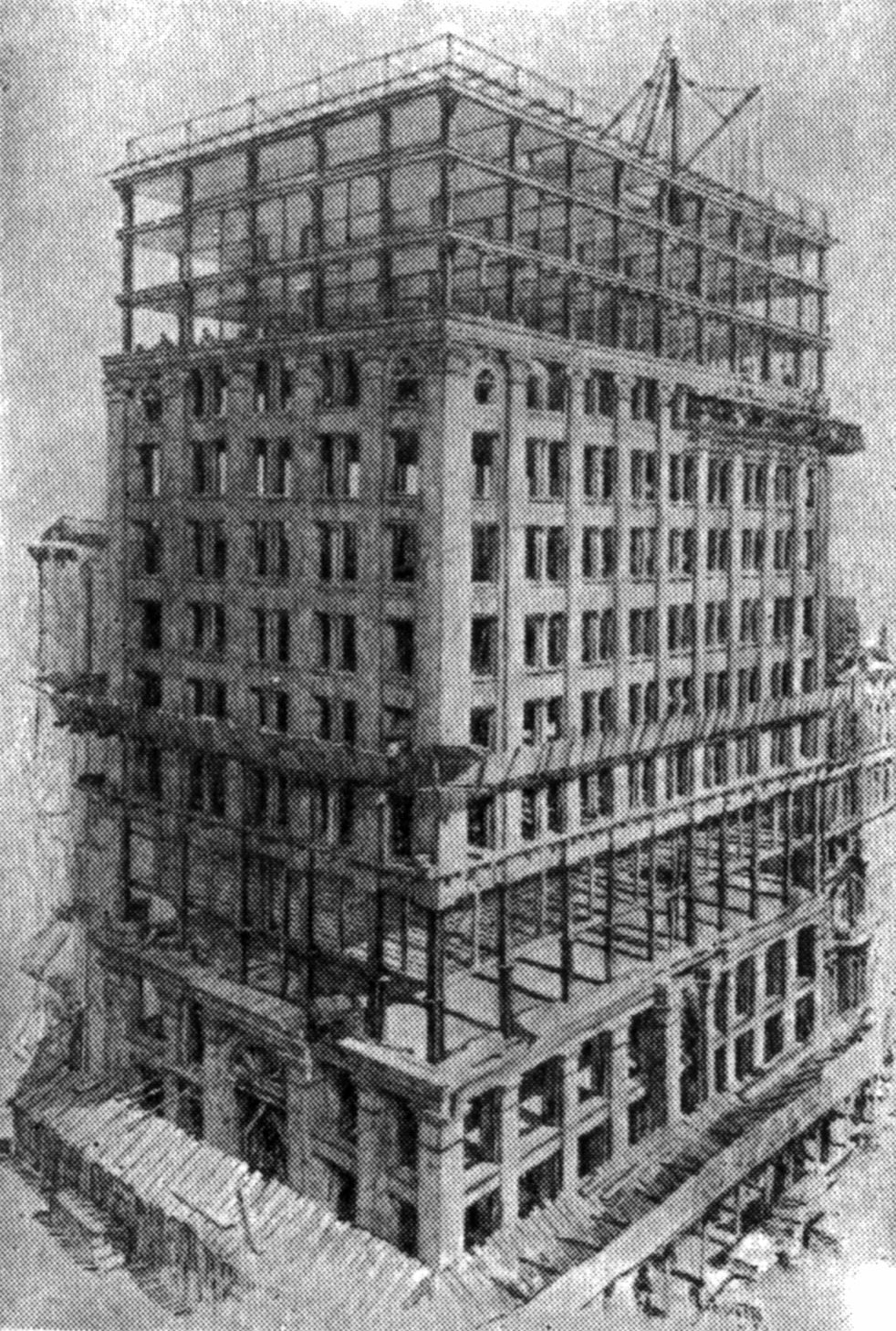
Under construction

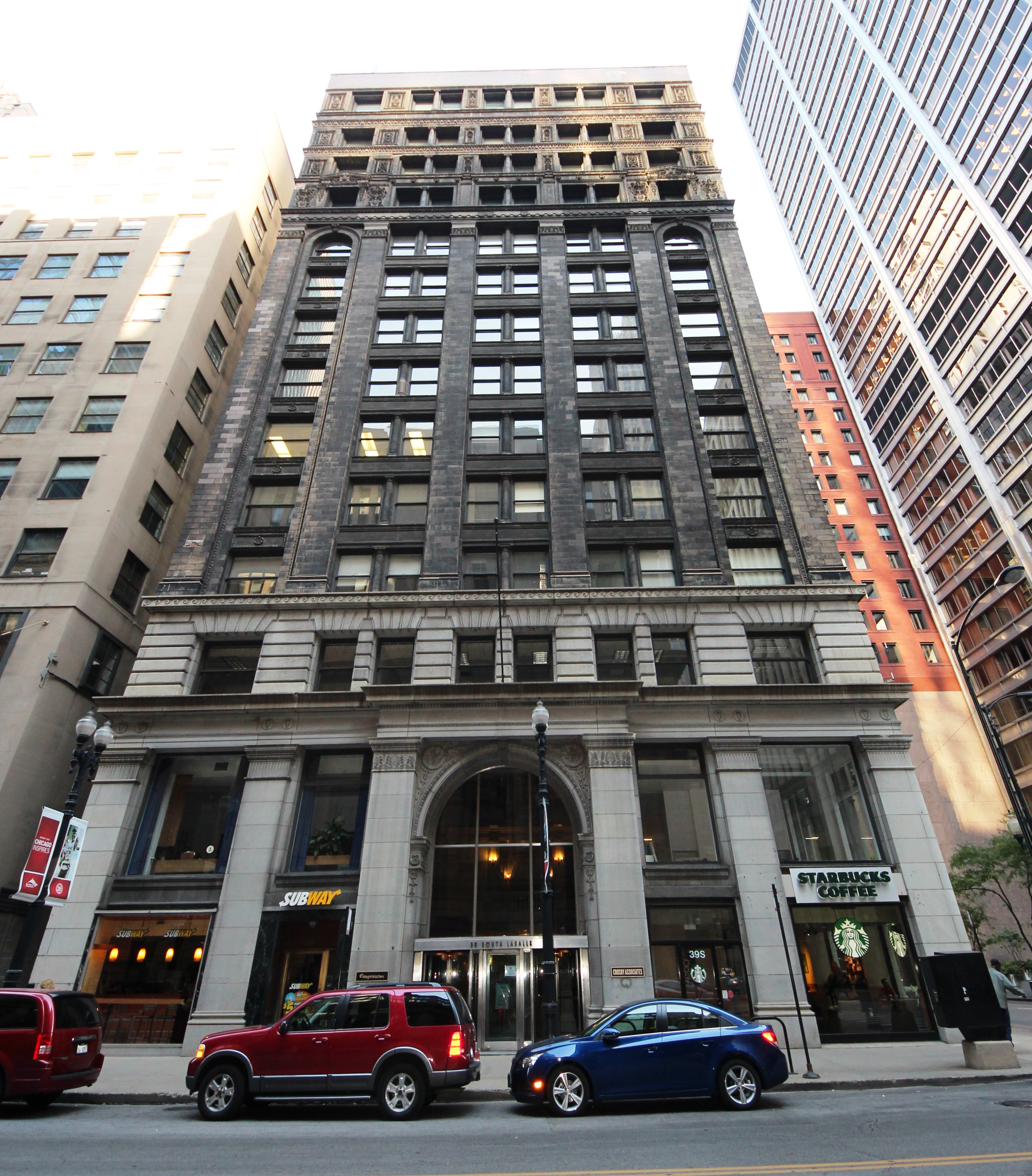
Street view from the west (2012)

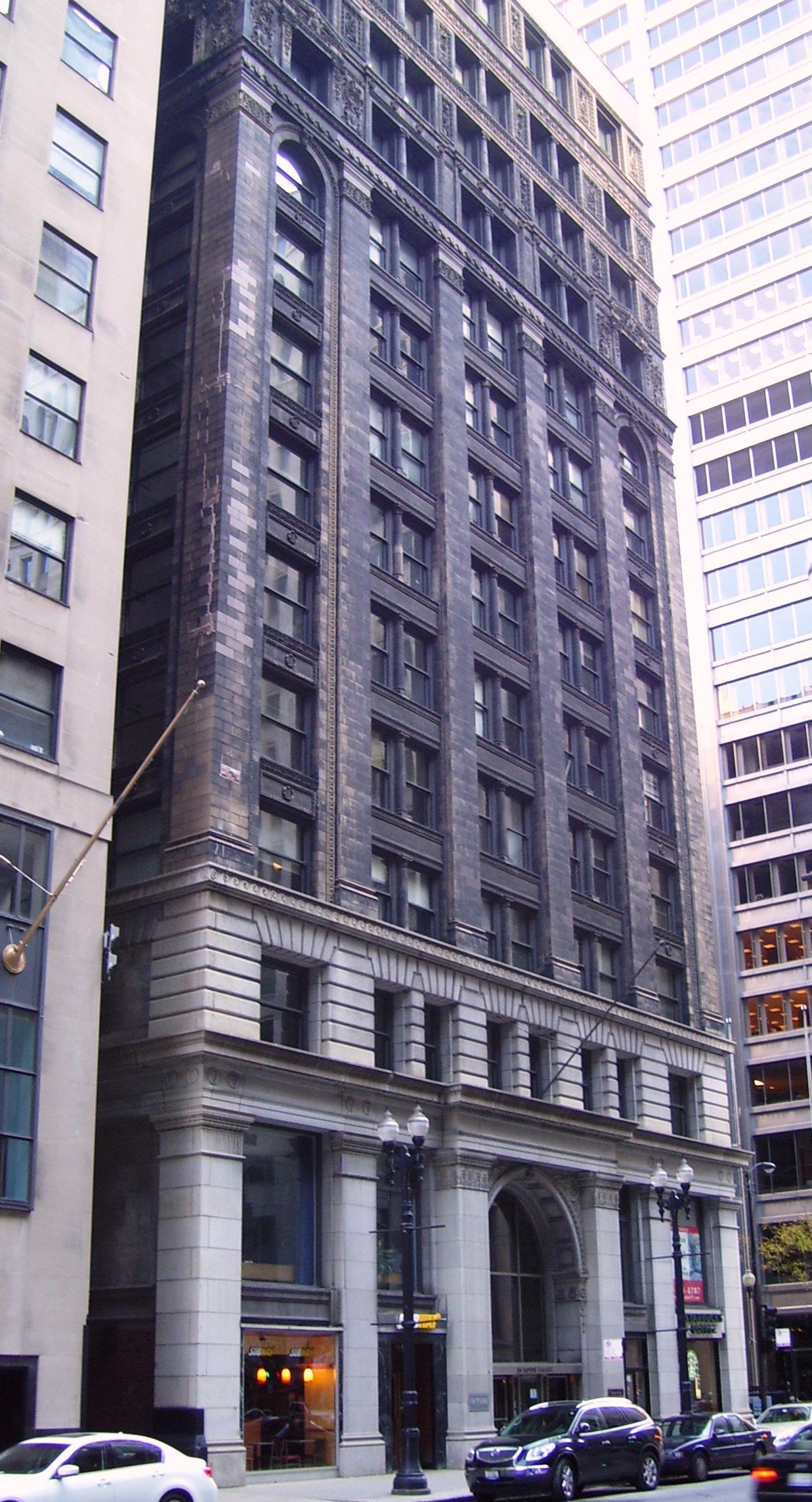
Street view from the northwest (2011)

== See also ==
- List of Chicago Landmarks
- List of early skyscrapers
