= Lincoln Park Passerelle =

- U.S. Historic district – Contributing property
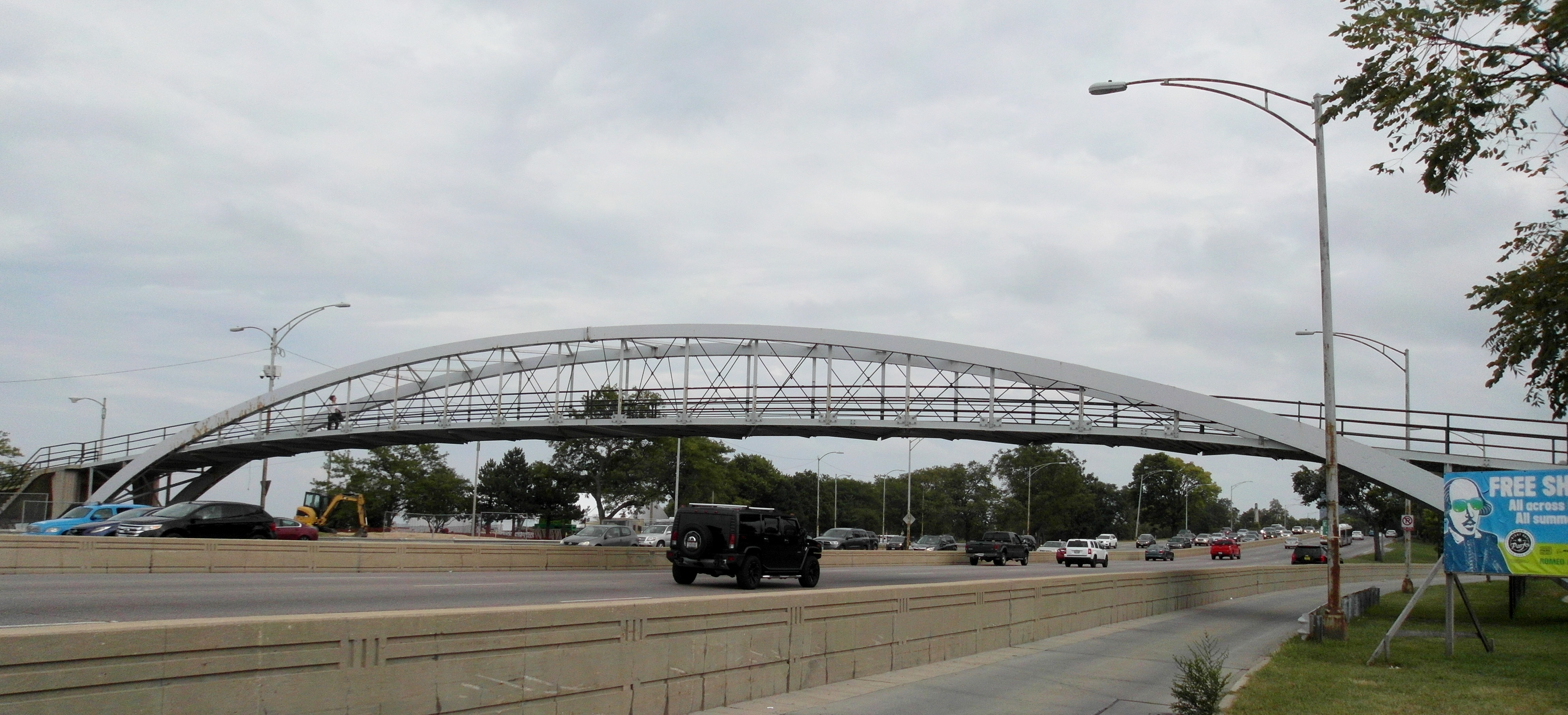
- Location: Chicago, Illinois
- Coordinates: 41°54′55.3″N 87°37′39.1″W
- Built: 1940
- Architect: Ralph H. Burke
- Architectural style: Modern
- Part of: Lincoln Park

The Lincoln Park Passerelle is a through arch pedestrian bridge in Chicago. It spans Lake Shore Drive, and allows pedestrians to cross between Lincoln Park and the North Avenue Beach. The bridge was designed by Ralph H. Burke and was completed in 1940. It is a contributing property to the Lincoln Park Historic District. It was featured in the Museum of Modern Art's exhibit "Built in USA: 1932-44", and the museum designated it one of the country's 47 best structures. Preservation Chicago listed the bridge as one of Chicago's seven most endangered landmarks in 2007, as it is threatened with demolition.
