= Jeffery Theater =

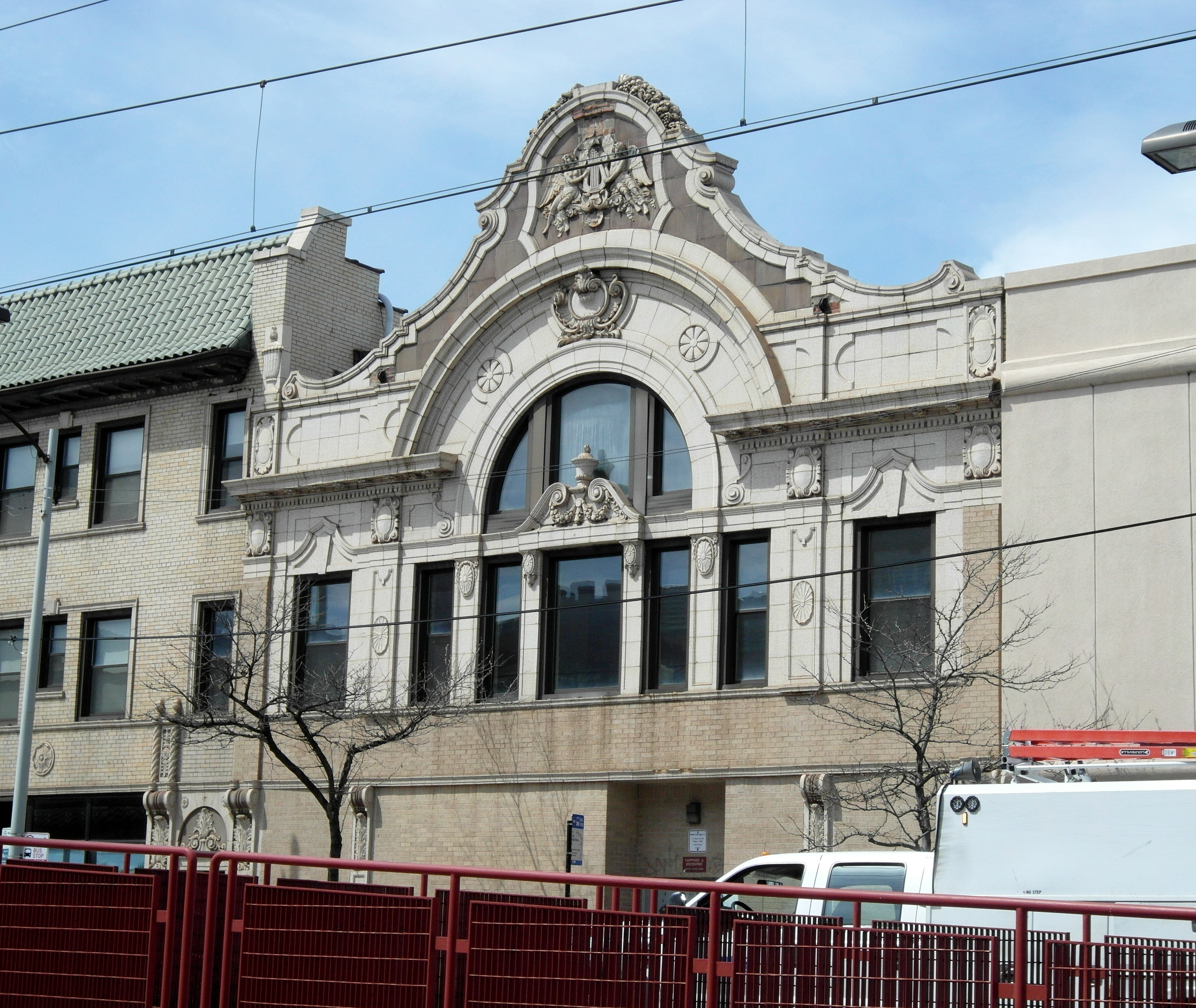

General information
- Architectural style: Neoclassical
- Location: 1952 E. 71st St., Chicago, Illinois
- Coordinates: 41°45′58.8″N 87°34′36.3″W
- Completed: 1924
- Opened: 1925

Design and construction
- Architect(s): William P. Doerr

The Jeffery Theater is a vacant theater building at 1952 E. 71st Street, in Chicago's South Shore neighborhood.

== History ==
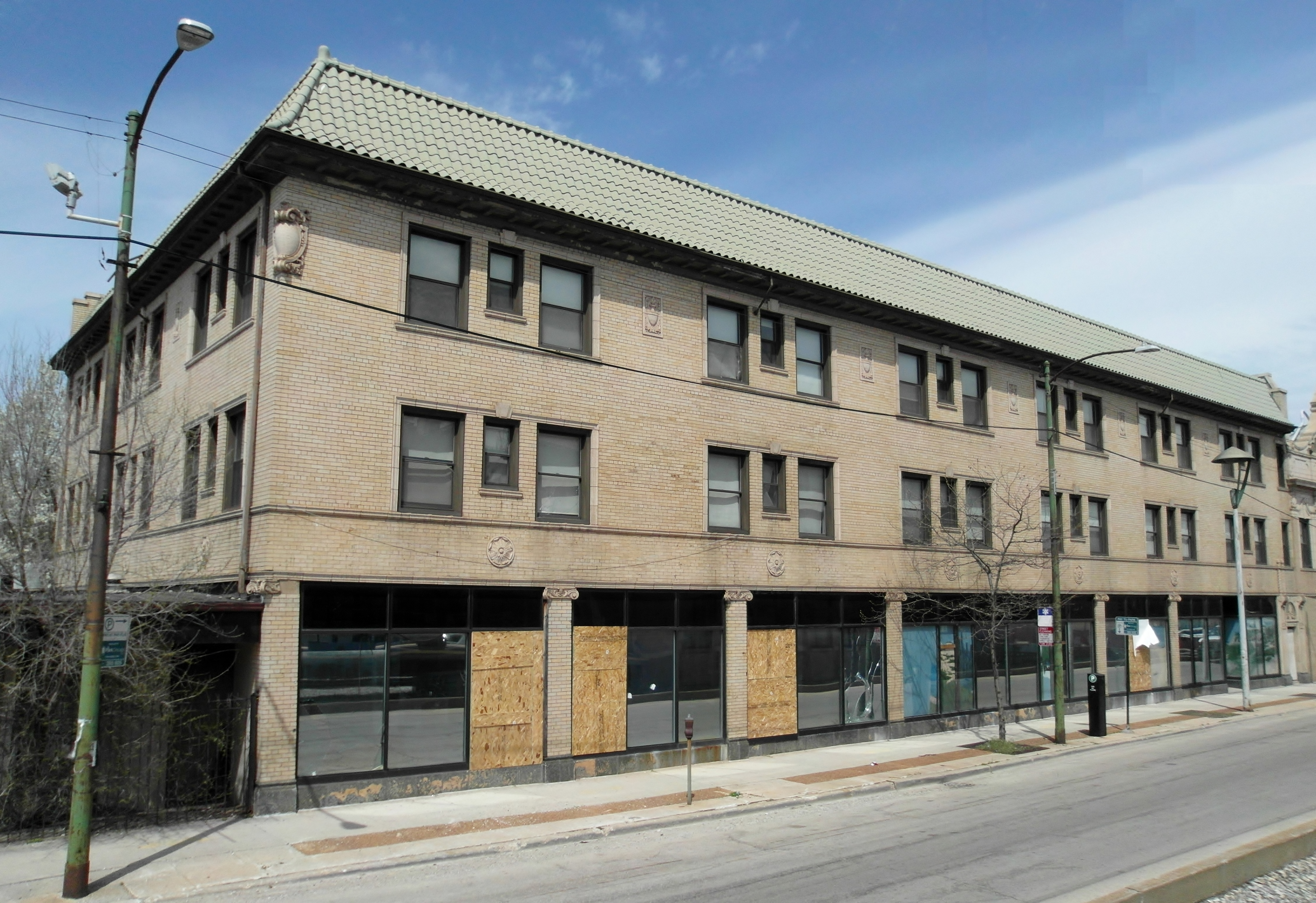
The Spencer Arms Hotel

Designed by William P. Doerr, it was built in 1924 and opened in 1925 as a vaudeville and movie theater. The building also housed the Spencer Arms Hotel, a fifty-room hotel to the west of the theater, while the Jackson Park National Bank was located at the corner of 71st and Jeffery. The first floor of the Spencer Arms Hotel contained commercial space.

The Jeffery Theater had a single screen and seating for 1,795 people and was originally part of the Cooney Brothers circuit. It was operated by the Warner Bros. Circuit Management Corp. in the 1930s and 1940s. The theater closed in 1977. In the late 1990s, ShoreBank purchased the building, and remodeled the building's interior into office space, though a portion of the theater's lobby remains intact. ShoreBank was closed as a failed institution in 2010.

In 2014, Preservation Chicago listed the Jeffery Theater as one of Chicago's 7 most endangered buildings, as there were plans to demolish the building and build a McDonald's at the site. In 2017, developers announced plans to demolish the building to build an entertainment complex, and on February 11, 2020, a demolition permit was requested. The permit was placed on a 90-day hold, because the building is orange rated in the Chicago Historic Resources Survey, signifying that it "possesses potentially significant architectural or historical features".
