= Central Manufacturing District–Pershing Road Development Historic District =

- U.S. National Register of Historic Places
- U.S. Historic district
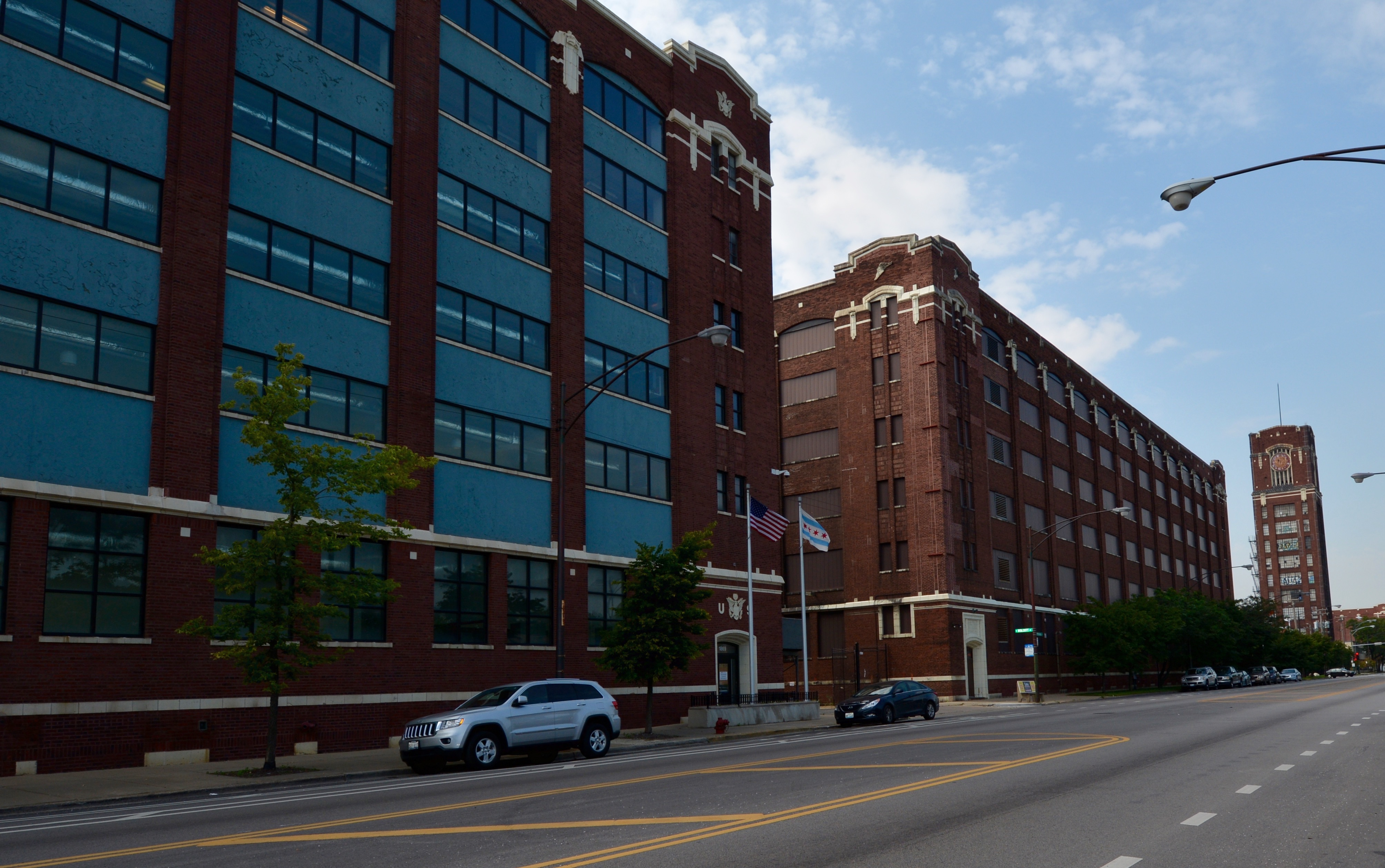

- Location within Chicago metropolitan area Location within Illinois Location within the United States
- Location: South side of W. Pershing Road from 1831 to 2245 & 1950, Chicago, Illinois
- Coordinates: 41°49′20″N 87°40′30″W
- Area: 77 acres (31 ha)
- NRHP reference No.: 15000522
- Added to NRHP: August 18, 2015

The Central Manufacturing District–Pershing Road Development Historic District is an industrial historic district on Pershing Road in the New City community area of Chicago, Illinois. An expansion of the original Central Manufacturing District, the district includes seventeen industrial buildings constructed between 1917 and 1948. The Central Manufacturing District, which was created in 1902, was one of the first planned industrial parks in the United States. By 1915, the district had grown to fill its original boundaries, and its developers bought a plot of land on Pershing Road for continued growth. To support businesses in the Pershing Road district, the developers built a freight rail depot, a water tower, and a power plant. The White City Cold Storage Company became the first business in the development the following year, and over the ensuing decades an extensive list of cold storage, manufacturing, and shipping companies used facilities in the district.

The district was added to the National Register of Historic Places on August 18, 2015.
