= Venture Stores =

Defunct chain of retail stores

Venture Stores, Inc.
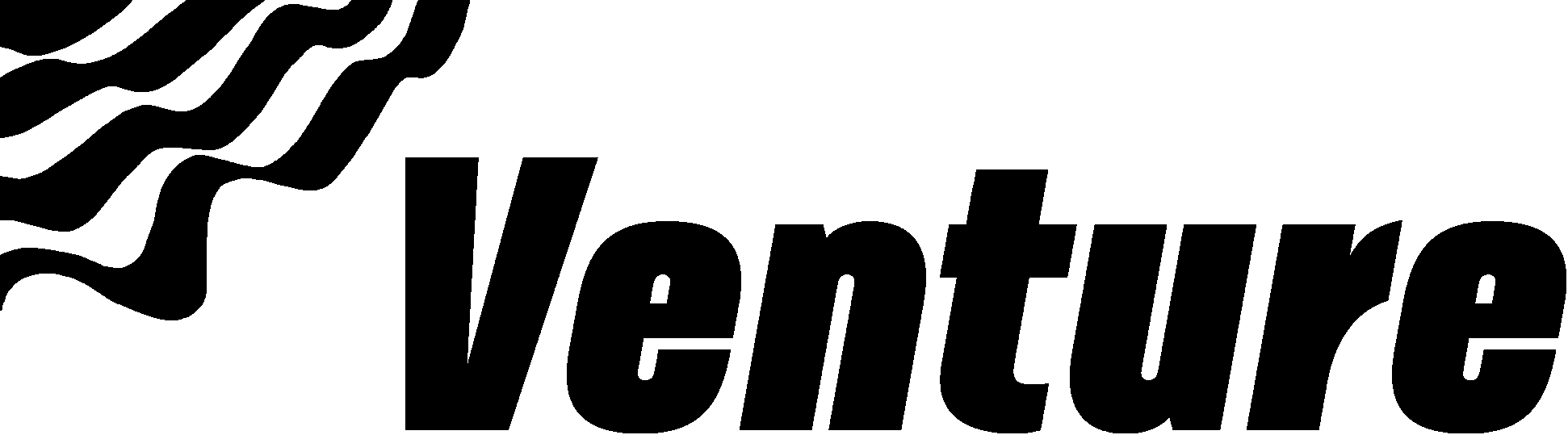
- Final logo, used from 1995 to 1998
- Type: Defunct
- Traded as: NYSE: VEN
- Industry: Retail (Department & Discount)
- Founded: 1968; 58 years ago St. Louis, Missouri
- Defunct: July 15, 1998; 28 years ago
- Fate: Bankruptcy, Liquidation
- Headquarters: O'Fallon, Missouri
- Key people: Robert Wildrick, Julian Seeherman
- Products: Clothing, footwear, bedding, furniture, jewelry, beauty products, electronics, and housewares.
- Number of employees: 10,000
- Website: www.venturestores.com (archived at Deadmalls.com)

Venture Stores, Inc., was a chain of retail stores aimed at the discount department-store market. John Geisse, formerly of Target Stores, and May Department Stores' executive vice president, Dave Babcock, founded the chain in 1968. Venture Stores expanded to operate over 70 stores with major market share in St. Louis, Chicago, and Kansas City, and expanded across various areas in the United States over a period of nearly 30 years, becoming the largest discount chain in Chicago. In January 1998, Venture Stores entered a Chapter 11 bankruptcy and closed within six months.

== History ==
The chain was founded in 1968 when Target founder John F. Geisse went to work for May Department Stores. Under an antitrust settlement reached with the Department of Justice, May was unable to acquire any more retail chains at the time, and the department-store company needed a way to compete against the emerging discount-store chains. When May's Dave Babcock learned that Geisse had resigned from Target Stores, he spoke with Geisse about starting a new discount retailer, resulting in the founding of Venture.

The first Venture store opened in Overland, Missouri, on January 29, 1970. In 1976, Geisse retired and left Venture Stores, which had by that time expanded to 20 units.

In 1978, Venture Stores purchased 12 Turn Style locations in Illinois and Iowa, with the stores reopening as Venture stores in August of that year. In 1990, Venture separated from May and became a private corporation.

First logo, used from 1970 to 1991

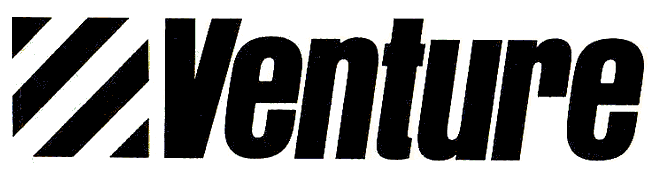
Second logo, used from 1991 to 1995. Similar to the first one, but italicized.

Venture's advertising slogan during the 1980s was "Save at Venture, Save With Style". or "SWS". In the 1990s, Venture employed two other slogans; the first, tied to a companywide remodeling initiative aimed at making the stores more like Kohl's, was "See What's New For You!". At the time Venture closed, its slogan was "See What A Little Money Can Buy".

=== Bankruptcy ===
Sign for the Venture store in Davenport, Iowa, in January 1998

By the 1990s, the chain found that it was unable to compete against other retail chains, such as Kmart, Target, and Walmart. Venture tried to return to its founding principles as an upscale discounter and remodeled most of its 90+ stores. In 1993, Venture would enter the Texas market, opening ten stores in the Houston and Dallas-Fort Worth areas. In November 1996, the last Venture store would open in St. Peters, Missouri. In December 1996, Venture would try and test-market a chain of lower priced stores called Venture Dollar, with nine locations in Illinois, Missouri, and Texas.

Venture sold the Texas stores to Kmart in 1997 and closed its distribution center in Corsicana, Texas. The company entered Chapter 11 bankruptcy on January 20, 1998, and tried to operate with a smaller number of stores. The effort was not successful, and the company announced its closing on April 27, 1998. Liquidation of store inventory continued through July 1998. Most of the former Venture buildings were absorbed into other chains, primarily Kmart (for their new Big Kmart stores at the time), Others were absorbed by Kohl's, Shopko, and Burlington Coat Factory.
