= Central Manufacturing District =

Coordinates: 41°49′15″N 87°39′30″W

- Planned development
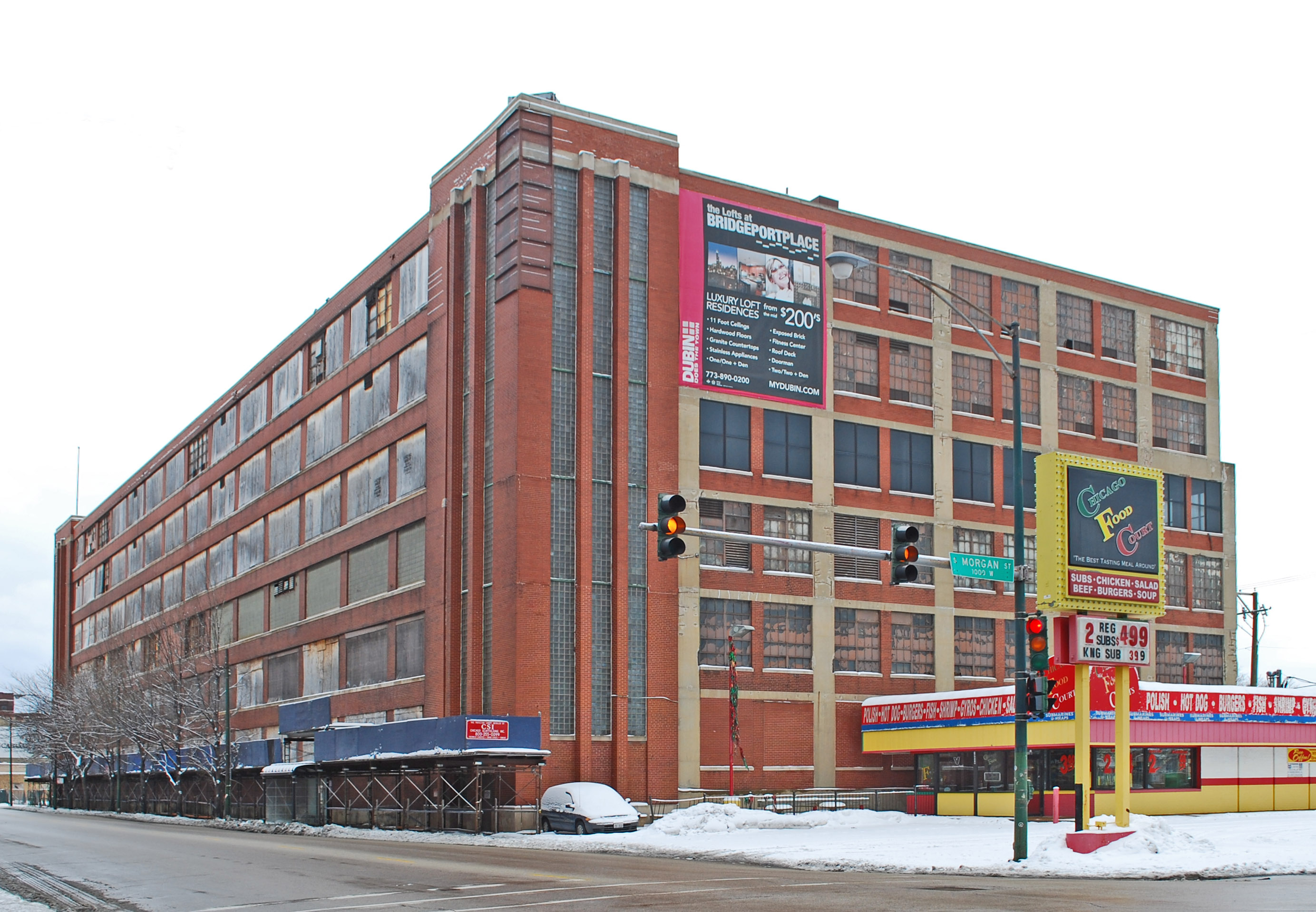
- The Spiegel Administration Building, a Chicago Landmark, located in the Central Manufacturing District at the intersection of West 35th Street and South Morgan Street.
- Interactive map of Central Manufacturing District
- Country: United States
- State: Illinois
- County: Cook
- City: Chicago
- Community Area: list: Bridgeport; McKinley Park

Area
  - Total: 4.78 sq mi (12.38 km^{2})
- Time zone: UTC-6 (CST)
  - Summer (DST): UTC-5 (CDT)
- ZIP Codes: 60609

The Central Manufacturing District of Chicago is a 265-acre (1.07 km^{2}) area of the city in which private decision makers planned the structure of the district and its internal regulation, including the provision of vital services ordinarily considered to be outside the scope of private enterprise. It has been described as the United States' first planned industrial district.

In 2016, a portion of the Central Manufacturing District, the Central Manufacturing District-Original East Historic District, was added to the National Register of Historic Places by the National Park Service.

== History ==
=== Beginnings ===
In 1892, Frederick Henry Prince, a financier and railroad magnate, acquired south Chicago's Central Junction Railway, which connected the Union Stockyards with Chicago's major trunk lines to other cities. Seeing that the stockyards would not provide enough business for his railway, Prince began purchasing adjacent land. The CMD began in 1905 by developing a square mile adjacent to the Union Stockyards. The development ultimately led to $20 million (1905 $USD) worth of streets, sewers, rail facilities, docks, and other improvements. The district had its own architectural department and its own engineers to supervise the construction that it provided for its customers. The C.M.D. is considered the first modern industrial park, though it is predated by similar, but less encompassing developments such as Industry City in Brooklyn and Trafford Park in Manchester. Prince served as one of the CMD's two trustees from its founding.

Prince then built the Stockyards-Kenwood elevated railway to assist commuters in getting to the C.M.D.

=== Expansion ===
In 1911, the Wrigley Company built a 175,000 square foot factory at the corner of West 35th Street and South Ashland Avenue. During its peak, The district's tenants included Ford Motor Company, Rexall, the Pullman Company, and Westinghouse Electric Corporation.

The private railroad police that patrolled the Chicago Junction Railway had an approximately 100 percent conviction rate; private security also patrolled the grounds on motorcycle. Fire safety was assured by spreading apart the buildings, by wire-glass windows and metal frames, and by the CMD's 250,000-gallon sprinkler tower. According to Central Manufacturing District Magazine, lots were standardized "to accommodate the most economical building units, to eliminate waste ground, and to give an ideal arrangement of improvements and facilities with easy accessibility." Concrete tunnels were dug between plants and the CMD's freight station so that electric tractors could haul goods back and forth. Only one out of the CMD's hundreds of companies failed during the Great Depression. The CMD reduced rental and interest payments, extended credit, and forgave temporary mispayments during the 1930s. Prominent businesspeople of the district joined the CMD Club, which held various social activities. The CMD bragged of good housing "built for workers at cost" that could be found near the CMD's plants.

=== Decline ===
In 1957, the Stockyards-Kenwood elevated railway shut down after twenty years of deferred maintenance, limiting commuter options into the C.M.D. The Centex Industrial Park, in suburban Elk Grove Village, Illinois, inspired by the C.M.D. eventually became the preferred industrial form with its high, single story warehouses taking tenants from the C.M.D. The Central Manufacturing has sold off many of its original properties, and no longer manages its remaining Chicago holdings, as it did before 1964. The CMD Company, however, still has the 350-acre (1.4 km^{2}) Itasca industrial park, the 675-acre (2.73 km^{2}) St. Charles Business Park, and an industrial park in Phoenix. Moreover, Centex and other companies have imitated CMD's concept of private development and central services. In Los Angeles, a large industrial tract was also promoted by the Central Manufacturing District of Chicago.

After changing hands several times, the Wrigley Factory at West 35th Street and South Ashland Avenue was demolished. In 2014, Preservation Chicago included the Central Manufacturing District on its list of most endangered buildings.

== Geography ==
The CMD was located in the south of Chicago. Prior to development, the territory was prairieland. By 1923, 48 percent of Chicago's population lived within four miles (6.4 km) of the CMD. The CMD provided centralized services in transportation, construction, finance, and diverse other services. Bubbly Creek, the south fork of the South Branch of the Chicago River, is located in the Central Manufacturing District and provided easy access to water transportation for industrial use. Chicago itself lay at the geographical nexus of the nation's productive activity, at the center of its markets and the hub of its railways. According to the Encyclopedia of Chicago, it was "Bounded roughly by 35th Street to the north, Morgan Street to the east, Pershing Road to the south, and Ashland Avenue to the west"

== Original East Historic District ==
The Central Manufacturing District–Original East Historic District (Original East Historic District) is a historic district listed on the National Register of Historic Places located in the Bridgeport and McKinley Park community areas. The Original East Historic District has sixty-six contributing properties and seven noncontributing properties. It does not include the entire area of the Central Manufacturing District with its contributing properties limited to the ranges of 3500-3700 blocks of South Morgan Street. South Racine Avenue, and South Iron Street: 3500-3900 blocks of South Ashland Avenue: 1000-1600 blocks of West 35th and West 37th Streets: and 1200-1600 West 38th Street. The proposed Central Manufacturing District–Pershing Road Development Historic District, while it shares a name with the Central Manufacturing District, is outside of the traditional Central Manufacturing District's boundaries with the former's easternmost point being 1839 W. Pershing Rd.

== Future plans and proposals ==
The future plans and proposals for the Central Manufacturing District are divided among plans that would seek to revitalize the commercial and industrial base of the area and adaptive reuse plans that would transition the area to a more residential character.

In 2017, there was community discussion of changing the area from one of commercial and industrial use by converting some of the buildings into multi-family and senior housing.

During Chicago's bid for Amazon HQ2, Alderman George Cardenas pitched the Central Manufacturing District as one of the sites that should be included in the city's package to Amazon. Ultimately, the Central Manufacturing District was not chosen by the State of Illinois which submitted City of Chicago sites in Bronzeville, the Fulton-Randolph Market District, the Illinois Medical District, the Old Chicago Main Post Office, the James R. Thompson Center, and various other sites in the Chicago Loop, as well as two suburban sites in Oak Brook and Schaumburg respectively.

In 2017, the McKinley Park Development Council was awarded a Local Technical Assistance Grant from the Chicago Metropolitan Agency for Planning to amongst other things, create a plan for the Central Manufacturing District. The plan is scheduled to be completed December 2019.

In 2020, Preservation Chicago included the Central Manufacturing District in their list of Chicago's 7 most endangered buildings.
