= White Hen Pantry =

Defunct US convenience store chain

- Industry: Retail
- Founded: 1965; 61 years ago
- Defunct: 2013; 13 years ago
- Fate: Acquired by 7-Eleven
- Headquarters: Lombard, Illinois, US
- Area served: United States
- Products: Convenience stores

White Hen Pantry (known as White Hen in the Midwest) was a Lombard, Illinois-based chain of approximately 261 predominantly franchisee-owned convenience stores located in and around Detroit, Boston / southern New Hampshire, southern Wisconsin, northwest Indiana and Chicagoland areas of the United States. Most of the stores were open 24 hours and offered an array of standard convenience store fare such as coffees, cappuccinos, frozen and dry goods and toiletries. Many also had full delis serving boxed sandwiches and salads, name-brand meats and cheeses and fresh fruits and vegetables. White Hen's array of services included catering options and sales of external holiday gift cards. Most stores also had ATMs and sold lottery tickets; White Hen was the largest ticket vendor of the Illinois Lottery before being acquired by 7-Eleven.

Most of the White Hen Pantry locations were rebranded as 7-Eleven stores by the end of 2010.

== History ==
=== 2000s ===
In 2001 it was sold to Clark Retail Enterprises, Inc., which immediately sold all 55 White Hen Pantry stores in Massachusetts and New Hampshire to New England Pantry, Inc. This deal made New England Pantry a sub-franchisor of the White Hen Pantry brand, and its exclusive franchisor in the New England area.

In summer 2005, White Hen's push toward deli-fresh offerings was strong in Chicago, where it offered free samples of its private label Pantry Select chips at an August Chicago Cubs baseball game. Its new deli-fresh focus reportedly failed to meet the needs of some of the many demographics to which the store catered, hurting the quick growth for which it had originally planned.

In line with its focus on deli-fresh goods, White Hen opened what it billed as a "store of the future" in Chicago's Wicker Park neighborhood on April 17, 2006. In addition to offering White Hen's standard fare, this particular venue offered "an expanded line-up of natural and organic foods, fresh Pantry Select green salads ... and a toasted-to-order Hot & Fresh sandwich program with a state-of-the-art touch screen ordering system."

=== 2010s ===
The White Hen logo continued for a time to be used for some prepared foods such as sandwiches, under the "Pantry Select" brand. Deli counters and products were removed and replaced with standard 7-Eleven offerings. In October 2013, a White Hen Pantry store located in Boston, Massachusetts, closed, preparing for a conversion to 7-Eleven.
