= Jewel Tea Company, Inc. building =

- Jewel Tea Company, Inc.
- Formerly listed on the U.S. National Register of Historic Places
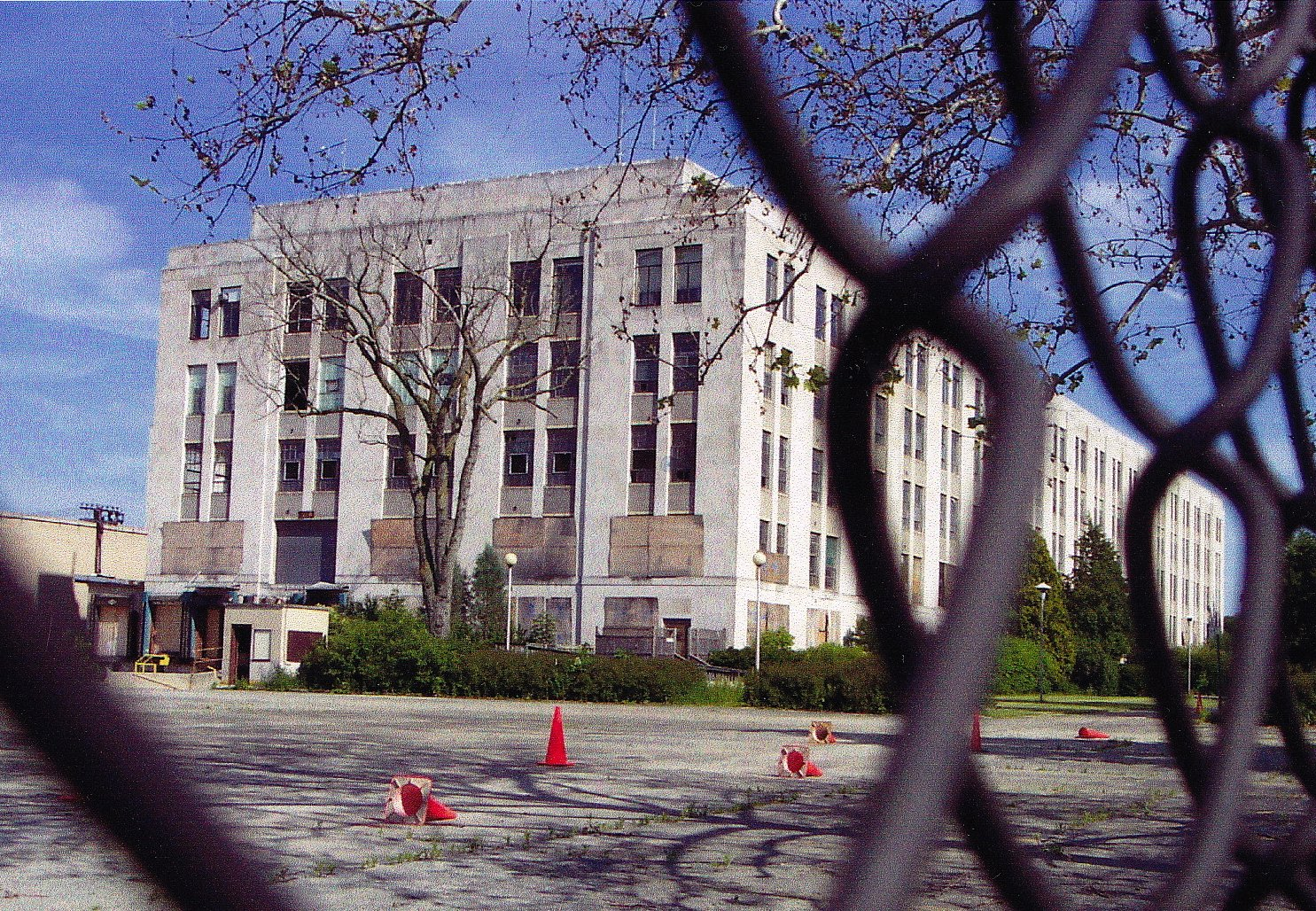

- Location within Chicago metropolitan area Location within Illinois Location within the United States
- Location: 511 Lake Zurich Rd., Barrington, Illinois
- Coordinates: 42°09′40″N 88°07′40″W
- Area: 55 acres (22 ha)
- Built: 1929-30
- Architect: Holabird and Root
- Architectural style: Art Deco, Moderne
- Demolished: 2004
- NRHP reference No.: 03001462

Significant dates
- Added to NRHP: February 3, 2004
- Removed from NRHP: January 2, 2020

The Jewel Tea Company, Inc. building was a historic building at 511 Lake Zurich Road in Barrington, Illinois. The building was built in 1929-30 as a new headquarters for the Jewel Tea Company, which operated the Jewel supermarket chain. The building was used as the company's main offices as well as a manufacturing plant for several of Jewel's products, including coffee and tea. At the time, it was unusual for companies to relocate from the city to the suburbs, and Jewel's relocation to Barrington had a considerable economic impact on the village. Architecture firm Holabird & Root designed the building using a combination of the Art Deco and Moderne styles.

The company was bought by American Stores, inc in 1984 and was later added to the National Register of Historic Places on February 3, 2004. It was demolished later in the same year. and was removed from the National Register in 2020.
