= Turn Style =

Former American chain of discount department stores

Turn Style Department Stores Inc.
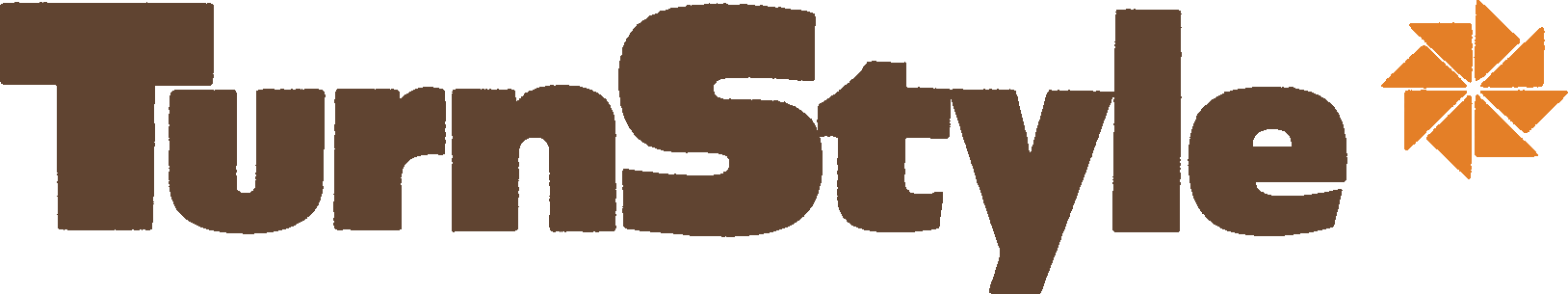
- Type: discount department store
- Industry: Retail
- Founded: 1957; 69 years ago in Lynn, Massachusetts
- Founder: Harold Sparks
- Defunct: 1978; 48 years ago
- Fate: stores sold individually to other chains
- Headquarters: Brighton, Massachusetts, United States
- Area served: Boston and US Midwest
- Products: Clothing, footwear, bedding, furniture, jewelry, beauty products, electronics and housewares.
- Parent: Jewel
- Website: None

Turn Style was an American chain of discount department stores and was a division of Chicago-based Jewel, the parent company of the Jewel Food Stores supermarket chain. Some Midwestern Turn Styles had an Osco Pharmacy, at the time very uncommon for a discount store in the 1960s and 1970s. At its peak, the chain comprised more than fifty stores throughout Chicago, as well as in downstate Illinois, Decatur, Illinois, Moline, Illinois; Davenport, Iowa; Omaha, Nebraska; Boston, Massachusetts; Merrillville, Indiana; Michigan, and Racine, Wisconsin.

== History ==
TurnStyle was a Brighton, Massachusetts-based discount department store chain that was founded by Harold Sparks who had opened his first store in Lynn, Massachusetts, in 1957. This was the first discount department store that had opened in the state of Massachusetts and the second in New England following the opening of Topps which had just opened 7 months earlier in neighboring Connecticut. Other locations were quickly opened in Massachusetts in Brighton (1958), Lawrence (1960), and Medford (1961).

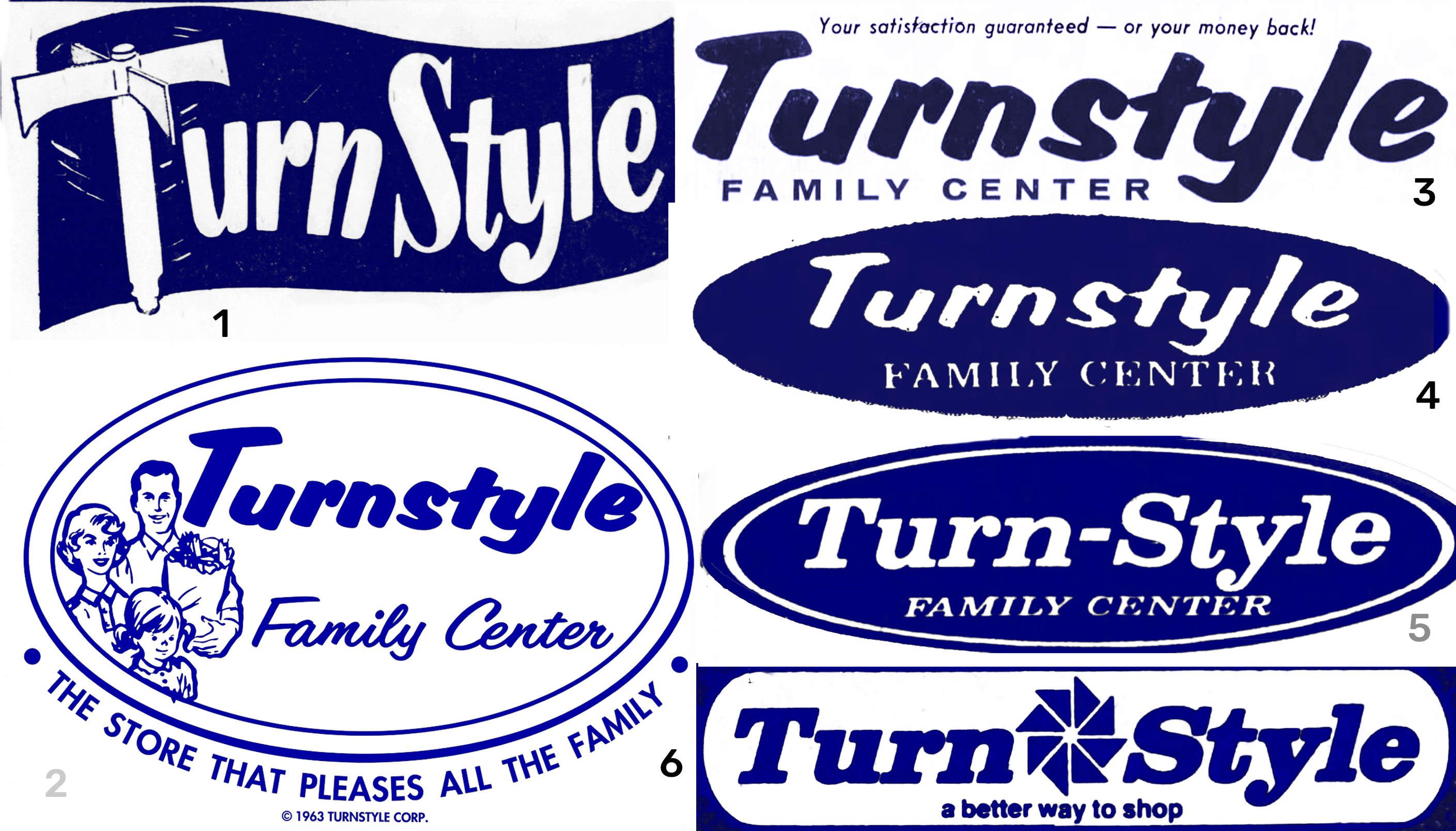
Corporate Logos 1957-1978: 1) TurnStyle (1957-1961); 2-4) Turnstyle Family Center (1961-1964); 5) Turn-Style Family Center (1965-1971); 6) Turn-Style / Turn Style (1972-1978)

Jewel acquired the TurnStyle brand in 1961 and began rapidly expanding the chain. Sales for the 1961 year were listed as $14 million (~$115 million in 2025) U.S. dollars with four stores, with headquarters in Brighton, Massachusetts. The first Turnstyle Family Center was opened in Racine in March 1962 (with Jewel Tea filing for service mark as a single word and one capital letter).

At its peak, the chain operated throughout the Midwest, as well as in the Boston, Massachusetts, area. Within three years of having opened a store in Racine, Wisconsin, profits as measured on a ROI basis were the highest within Jewel Companies. Rapid expansion, the corporate decision to incorporate a catalog type store within its four walls, and an unrealistic divisive venture into the "hypermarket" business, all caused profits to suffer.

The economy also caused Jewel to rethink its growth strategy and the decision was made to sell Turn-Style (hyphenated in its trademark from 1964 until selling the division) in order to concentrate its growth within its core businesses, which were food stores and drugstores. In 1978, 19 out of 22 of the existing stores were sold to May Department Stores and converted to the Venture format. Other stores were converted to large Osco Drug Stores, and some were closed entirely.
