= Spiegel Office Building =

- U.S. National Register of Historic Places
- U.S. Historic district – Contributing property
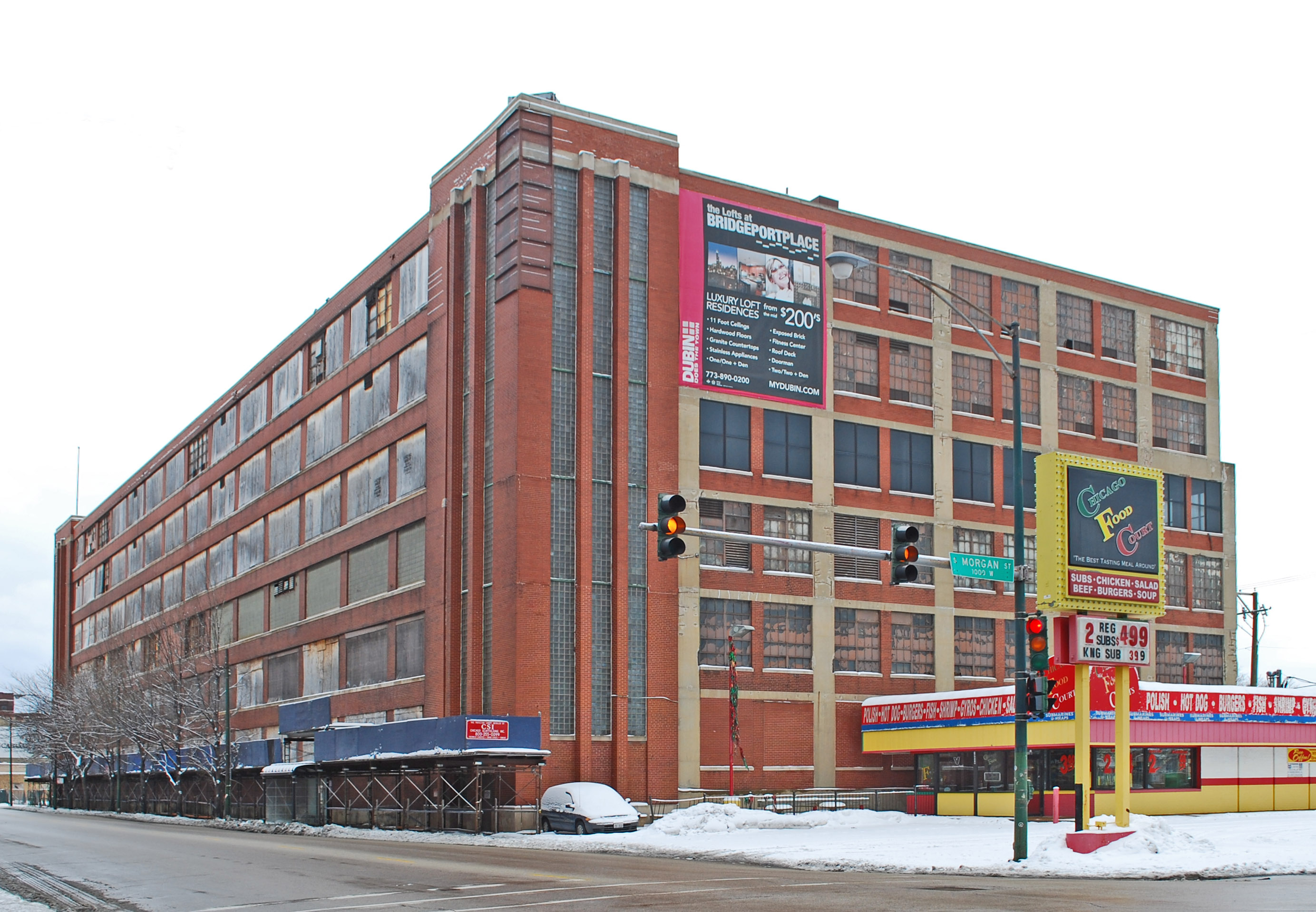

- Location within Chicago metropolitan area Location within Illinois Location within the United States
- Location: 1038 W. 35th St., Chicago, Illinois
- Coordinates: 41°49′50″N 87°39′09″W
- Area: less than one acre
- Built: 1936-37
- Architects: Battey & Kipp; A. Epstein & Sons
- Architectural style: Art Moderne
- Part of: Central Manufacturing District–Original East Historic District (ID16000004)
- NRHP reference No.: 09000025
- Added to NRHP: February 18, 2009

The Spiegel Office Building is a historic office building at 1038 W. 35th Street in the Bridgeport neighborhood of Chicago, Illinois, United States. It was built in 1936–37 as an office building for Spiegel Inc., a mail order company established in Chicago in 1865. The company built its new offices in the midst of a change in its goals and marketing, as it shifted from promoting its easy credit to offering higher-quality products to wealthier customers. The new office building allowed the company to consolidate several of its offices to improve efficiency and thus customer service. Engineers Battey & Kipp designed the Art Moderne style building, which had an industrial loft plan with open floors. In the 1940s, engineer Abraham Epstein placed an addition on the building, allowing the company to keep all of its offices in the building.

The building was added to the National Register of Historic Places on February 18, 2009.
