= Central Manufacturing District–Original East Historic District =

Historic district in Illinois, United States

- U.S. National Register of Historic Places
- U.S. Historic district
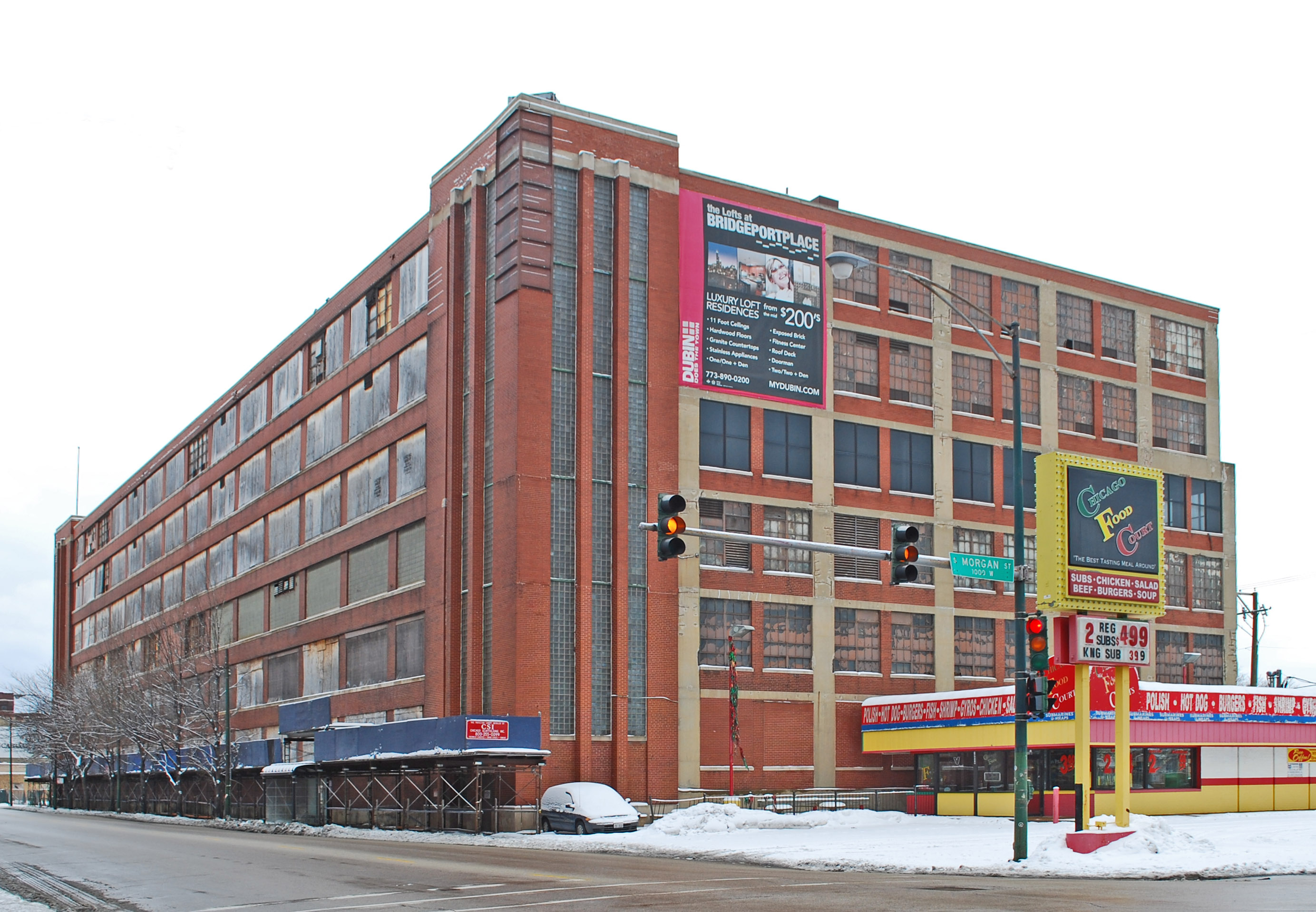
- The Spiegel Administration Building, a Chicago Landmark, located in the district at W. 35th St. and S. Morgan St.

- Location within Chicago metropolitan area Location within Illinois Location within the United States
- NRHP reference No.: 16000004
- Added to NRHP: 2016

The Central Manufacturing District–Original East Historic District (Original East Historic District) is a historic district listed on the National Register of Historic Places located in the Bridgeport and McKinley Park community areas. The Original East Historic District has sixty-six contributing properties and seven noncontributing properties. It does not include the entire area of the Central Manufacturing District with its contributing properties limited to the ranges of 3500-3700 blocks of South Morgan Street. South Racine Avenue, and South Iron Street: 3500-3900 blocks of South Ashland Avenue: 1000-1600 blocks of West 35th and West 37th Streets: and 1200-1600 West 38th Street.

== See also ==
- National Register of Historic Places listings in South Side Chicago
