= Little Village Environmental Justice Organization =

Non-profit organization in Chicago, Illinois concerned with environmental justice

- Formation: 1994
- Type: Non-profit
- Legal status: 501(c)(3)
- Executive Director: Kim Wasserman-Nieto
- Website: http://lvejo.org/

The Little Village Environmental Justice Organization (LVEJO) is a non-profit organization based in Chicago, Illinois. Originally founded in 1994, LVEJO's mission is to achieve environmental justice in the Little Village area of Chicago. LVEJO's work is centered around working with the community and aims to address the root of environmental issues.

== Establishment ==
LVEJO was originally founded in 1994. During that summer, Gary Elementary School was refurbishing the windows as well as re-tarring the roof. While this work was going on, students were having asthma attacks, fainting, and were exposed to lead poisoning. Parents and community members organized and were able to have the work moved to the night. The success at Gary Elementary led them to create the Little Village Environmental Justice Project, known today as LVEJO.

== Accomplishments ==
=== Fisk and Crawford Power Plants Shutdown ===
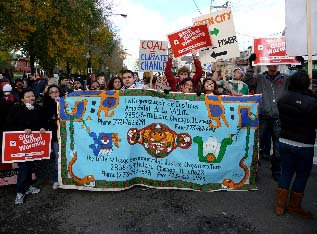
LVEJO protesting the Fisk and Crawford Power Plants

LVEJO was part of a coalition of environmental groups who advocated for the closure of two power plants. Their goal was to gather enough signatures to get a referendum on the 2003 ballot. The referendum asked for an ordinance that required Fisk and Crawford to reduce pollution by 90% by 2006 or permanently shut down. The groups accused the two power plants of increasing asthma rates and other health problems. A 2002 Harvard School of Public Health study looked at the impact that pollution from the Fisk and Crawford coal plants had on health. The study linked pollution from the plants to 41 premature deaths, 550 emergency room visits, 2,800 asthma attacks and 36,000 minor restricted activity days. The National Research Council found that pollution from the power plants cost the surrounding areas $127 million in hidden health costs. On February 28, 2012, it was announced that both power plants would be shut down.

=== Public Transit ===
Little Village has a high demand and little access to public transit. In 1997, the 31st Street bus route was canceled for low ridership leaving Little Village residents with only two bus lines. LVEJO's efforts resulted in the Chicago Transit Authority (CTA) extending the 35th Street bus route to include 31st Street between Kedzie and Cicero in summer 2012. It was announced by CTA president Dorval Carter Jr. that the Lincoln Avenue and 31st Street bus routes would come back on a trial basis in 2016. However, supporters of the routes believe that the trial bus schedule was designed to ensure that it fails to meet the ridership requirements.

=== Reclaiming Green Space ===
==== La Villita Park ====
In 2010, Little Village was ranked as second to last in Chicago neighborhoods in terms of access to open space. After years of community desires for more open space, the first park built in Little Village in over 75 years officially opened in December 2014. On a plot of land that was previously the Celotox asphalt factory, the 22 acre park is the city's largest brownfield conversion to date. It also doubled the amount of open space in Little Village. The park contains two soccer fields, two basketball courts, two baseball fields, a skate park and a playground.

==== Semillas de Justicia ====
In 2012, LVEJO began creating a community garden on a plot of remediated brownfield. The garden was named Semillas de Justicia (Seeds of Justice). A goal of the garden was to give community members a place to grow organic food that they can no longer afford and to bring the Little Village community together. As of October 2017, there are approximately thirty residential gardeners that work on the garden. LVEJO hosts a variety of events on the garden such as an annual Harvest Fest, weekly community dinners, art classes, and educational workshops.

== Active Campaigns ==
=== 31st Street Collateral Channel ===
With the success of La Villita Park, LVEJO has focused on the pollution coming from the 31st Street Collateral Channel. The water in the channel is contaminated with heavy metals and sewage that create toxic bubbles that release methane. Researchers at the University of Illinois at Chicago have found high levels of heavy metals and polycyclic aromatic hydrocarbons in the water. Although there have been proposals to redevelop the area, LVEJO believes that the environmental hazards must be dealt with first.

== See also ==
- Neighbors for Environmental Justice
