= Kimberly Wasserman =

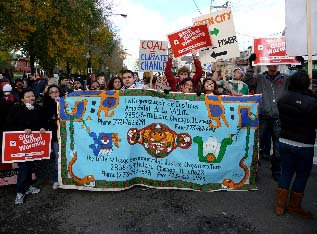
Wasserman led LVEJO's campaign for the shutdown of the Crawford and Fisk coal-fired plants.

Kimberly Wasserman (Kimberly Wasserman Nieto) is an American environmentalist and grassroots leader As director of the Little Village Environmental Justice Organization (LVEJO), she is a recipient of the 2013 Goldman Environmental Prize for leading the successful lobbying campaign for the passage of the Chicago Clean Power Ordinance that resulted in the closing of the Crawford and Fisk coal-fired power plants.

Wasserman was raised in Little Village, Illinois. She entered the world of environmental activism in 1998 after her three-month-old son suffered an asthma attack despite having no family history of asthma. After researching the connection between asthma and air pollution, she turned her attention to the coal-fired plants in her neighborhood and became involved with LVEJO. LVEJO is an organization that advocates for environmental justice in Little Village and throughout Chicago.

Wasserman started as a community organizer for LVEJO for seven years and has been an executive director since 2005. In 2002, LVEJO first mobilized politically against the emissions coming from the two plants. They organized the collection of signatures to get a referendum on the 2003 City Hall ballot requiring the two plants to either drastically reduce pollution or shut down. While they weren't able to get the immediate support from their aldermen, after a ten-year battle to sway their opinion, they were ultimately successful. On February 28, 2012, it was announced that the Fisk and Crawford plants would be permanently shut down.
