= Samuel Insull =

English-American business magnate (1859–1938)

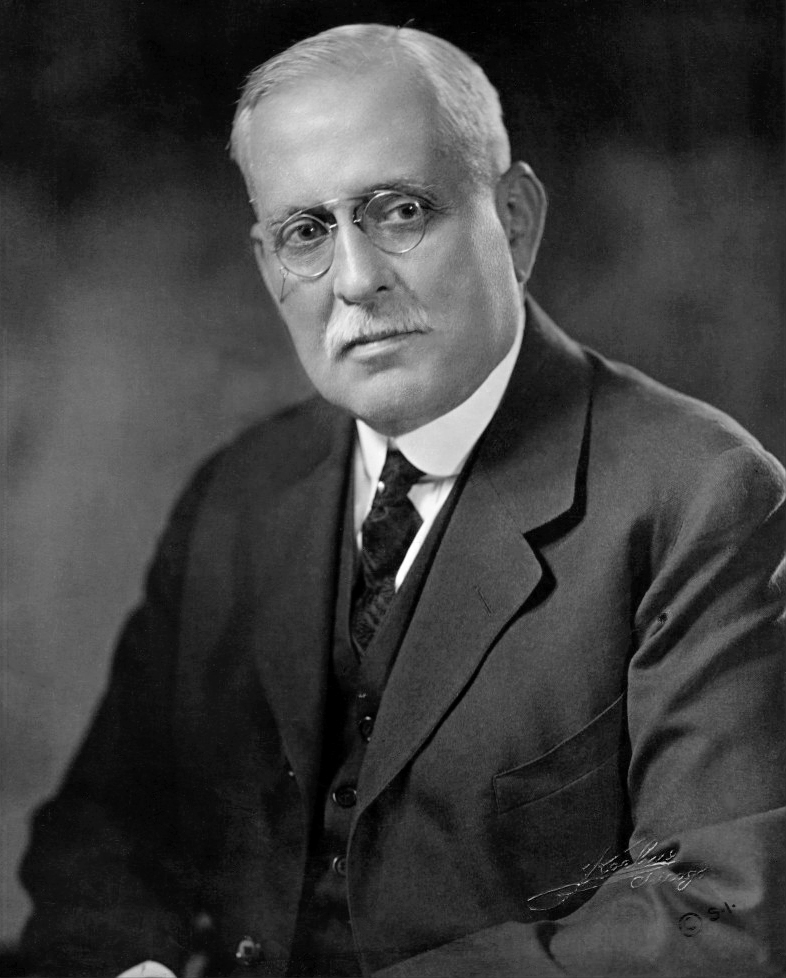
- Insull in 1920
- Born: November 11, 1859; London, England, United Kingdom
- Died: July 16, 1938 (aged 78); Paris, France
- Resting place: Putney Vale Cemetery, London
- Occupation: Business executive
- Known for: Chicago utilities empire
- Spouse: Gladys Wallis (m. 1899)

Samuel Insull (November 11, 1859 – July 16, 1938) was a British-American business magnate. He was an innovator and investor based in Chicago who helped create an integrated electrical infrastructure in the United States. Insull created holding companies that purchased utilities and railroads. Insull was responsible for the building of the Chicago Civic Opera House in 1929.

Due to the Great Depression, Insull's vast Midwest holding company empire collapsed, and he was accused of profiting personally by selling worthless stock to unsuspecting investors who trusted him because of his position and reputation. Following a seven-week trial, he and 16 co-defendants were acquitted of all charges after two hours of jury deliberation.

== Early life ==
Insull was born on November 11, 1859, in London, the son of Insull Insull, a tradesman and lay preacher who was active in the temperance movement, and Emma Short. He was one of five siblings who survived to adulthood. His younger brother, Martin, became a major executive at Sam's companies. Insull's career began as an apprentice clerk for various local businesses at age 14. He went on to become a stenographer at Vanity Fair. Through a newspaper ad, the 19-year-old became the private secretary and bookkeeper to Colonel George Gouraud, the London representative of Thomas Edison's telephone companies. When he learned of a job with Edison in the United States, Insull indicated he would be glad to have it, provided it was as Thomas Edison's personal secretary.

In 1881, at the age of 21, Insull immigrated to the US, complete with side whiskers to make him appear older than his years. In the decade that followed, Insull took on increasing responsibilities in Edison's business endeavors, building electrical power stations throughout the US. With several other Edison Pioneers, he participated in Henry Villard's January 1889 founding of Edison General Electric, which later became the publicly held company known as General Electric. In 1892, Insull was offered the post of second-vice-president at General Electric, but was unhappy at not being named its president. When the presidency went to another, Insull moved to Chicago as head of the Chicago Edison Company. Another consideration is that he was caught between opposing factions when J. P. Morgan combined the Thomson-Houston Electric Company and Edison General Electric to form the new company in April 1892. Those loyal to Edison accused Insull of selling out, and in fact he did welcome the infusion of capital, from the Vanderbilts, from J. P. Morgan, and others, as necessary for the company's future development. Edison forgave him, but others did not, and it seemed a good idea to move on to a new company in a new place.

== Life in Chicago ==
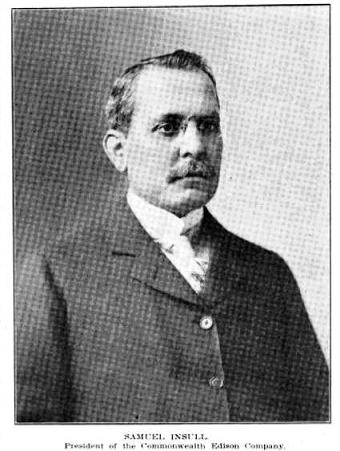
Samuel Insull, president of Commonwealth Edison, in 1910

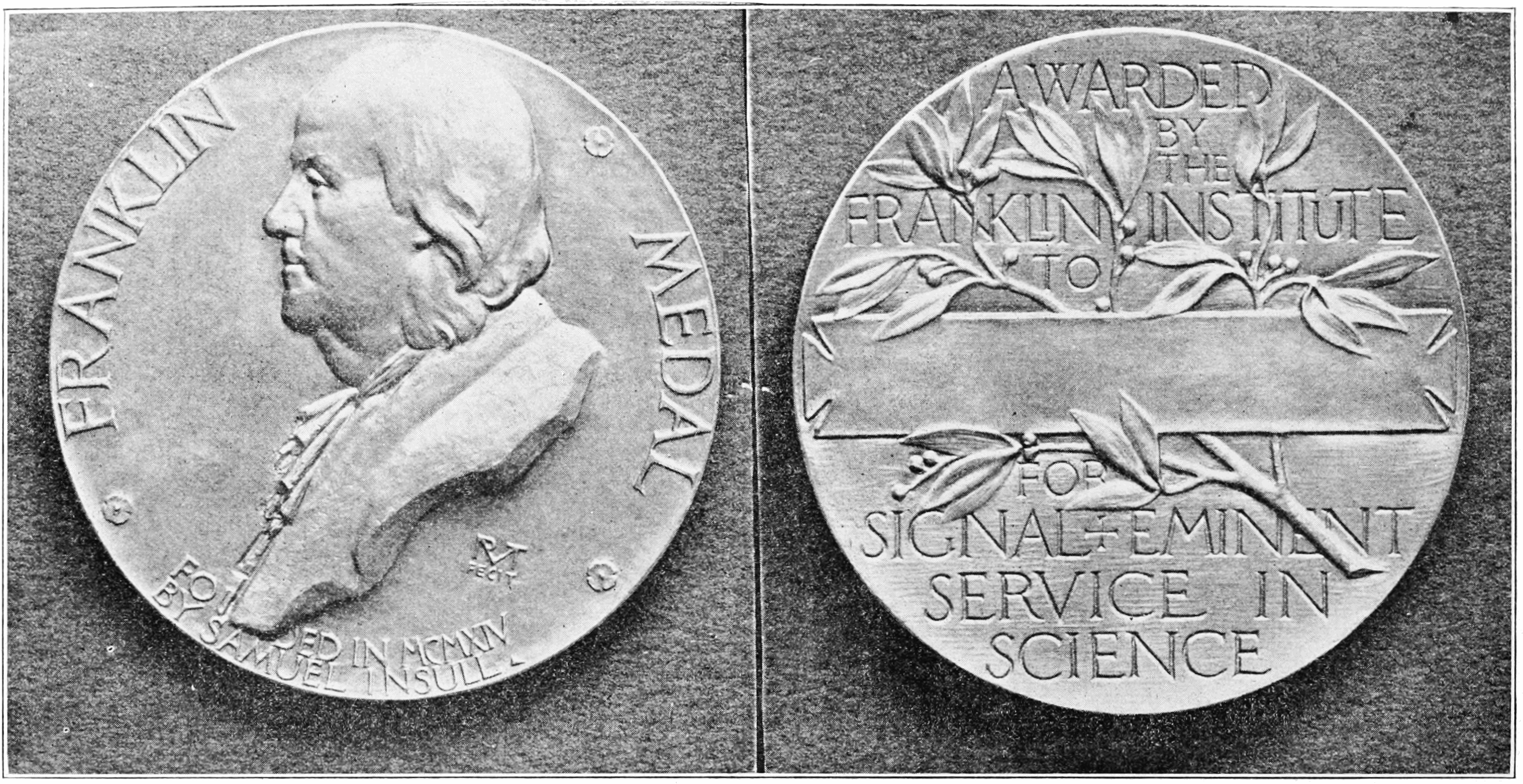
The Franklin Medal, "founded in 1914 by Samuel Insull ... awarded by the Franklin Institute for signal and eminent service in science"

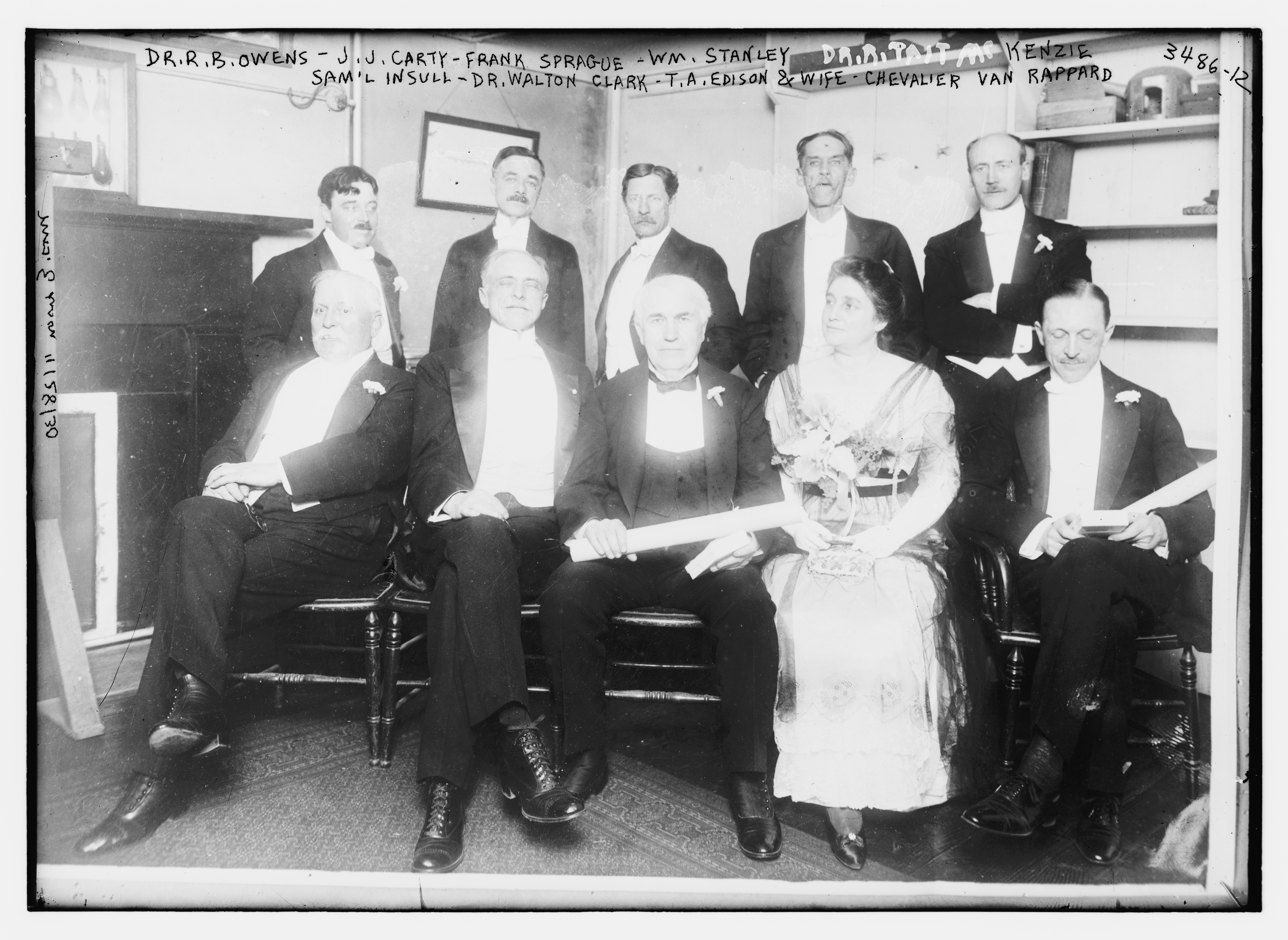
Insull (front row left) at the presentation of the first Franklin Medal to Thomas Edison (front row center) in 1915

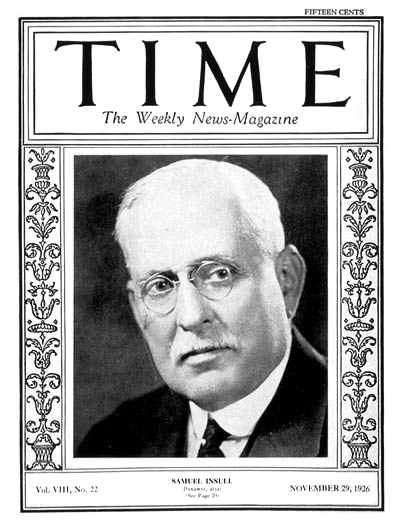
Insull on the cover of Time,
November 1926

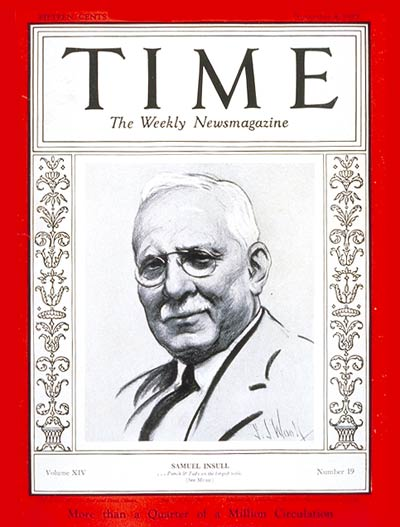
Insull on the cover of Time,
November 1929

The Western Edison Light Co. was founded in Chicago in 1882, three years after Edison developed a practical light bulb. In 1887, Western Edison became the Chicago Edison Co. Insull left General Electric and moved to Chicago in 1892, where he became president of Chicago Edison that year. Chicago Edison was losing money until Insull discovered a way to make it profitable during a Christmas visit to Brighton, England in 1894. To his surprise, he saw that the shops were closed, but every light in them was burning, something that never happened in the US. Finding the head of the town's electric company, he asked him how this could happen and was told the secret to it was not a flat rate bill, but use of a demand metered billing system, measuring not only total power consumption, but a set of rates for low-demand and high-demand electric use times. By 1897, Insull had worked out his formulas enough to offer Chicago electric customers two-tiered electric rates. With the new system, many homeowners found their bills lowered by 32% within a year.

In 1896, Insull became a US citizen. In 1897, he incorporated another electric utility, the Commonwealth Electric Light & Power Co. In 1907, Insull's two companies formally merged to create the Commonwealth Edison Co. During a Chicago meeting on October 8, 1918, he introduced Professor Thomas Garrigue Masaryk as the president of the future Czechoslovak Republic, de facto. As more people became connected to the electric grid, Insull's company, which had an exclusive franchise from the city, grew steadily. By 1920, when it used more than two million tons of coal annually, the company's 6,000 employees served about 500,000 customers. Annual revenues reached nearly $40 million. During the 1920s, its largest generating stations included the Fisk Generating Station and Crawford Station, both on the Sanitary and Ship Canal.

Insull began purchasing portions of the utility infrastructure of the city. When it became clear that Westinghouse's support of alternating current would win over Edison's direct current, Insull switched his support to AC in the war of the currents. His Chicago area holdings later included Federal Signal Corporation, Commonwealth Edison, Peoples Gas, and the Northern Indiana Public Service Company, and held shares of many more utilities. Insull also owned significant portions of many railroads, mainly electric interurban lines, including the Chicago North Shore and Milwaukee Railroad, Chicago Rapid Transit Company, Chicago Aurora and Elgin Railroad, Gary Railways, and Chicago South Shore and South Bend Railroad. He helped modernize these railroads and others.

As a result of owning these diverse companies, Insull is credited with being one of the early proponents for regulation of industry. He saw that federal and state regulation would recognize electric utilities as natural monopolies, allowing them to grow with little competition and to sell electricity to broader segments of the market. At the same time, a regulated monopoly could keep costs down by eliminating duplication of infrastructure by competing companies, while prices could be kept to reasonable rates by regulators. He used economies of scale to overcome market barriers by cheaply producing electricity with large steam turbines, such as the installations in the 1929 State Line Generating Plant in Hammond, Indiana. This made it easier to put electricity into homes. As part of his drive to efficiency, Insull practiced vertical integration. Coal was extracted from mines his companies developed, transported by the Chicago & Illinois Midland Railway to Havana, Illinois to be transferred to barges, both of which his companies controlled, and taken up the Illinois Waterway to Commonwealth Edison power stations. In the late 1920s, he attempted to build a dam on the Cumberland River just above scenic Cumberland Falls, posing a threat to the cataract's flow, but was thwarted by conservation interests and the Kentucky legislature.

Samuel Insull also had interests in broadcasting. Through his long association with Chicago's Civic Opera, he thought the new medium of radio broadcasting would be a way to bring opera performances into people's homes. On hearing of the work of Westinghouse to establish a radio station in Chicago, he contacted the company. Together the two companies arranged for a radio station to be built in Chicago which would be operated jointly by Commonwealth Edison and Westinghouse. KYW's first home was the roof of the Edison Company building at 72 West Adams Street in Chicago, and it went on the air November 11, 1921. It was Chicago's first radio station.

Though the partnership came to an end in 1926, with Westinghouse buying out Edison's interest in KYW, Insull's interest in broadcasting did not stop there. He formed the Great Lakes Broadcasting Company in 1927 and purchased Chicago radio stations WENR and WBCN; the two stations were merged on June 1, 1927, with Insull paying a million dollars for WENR alone. Insull moved the stations first into the Strauss Building, then into Insull's Civic Opera House, where WENR became an affiliate of the NBC Blue Network. Insull's Great Lakes Broadcasting Company also included a mechanical television station, W9XR, which began in 1929 after the company installed the first 50,000 watt radio transmitter in Chicago for its two radio stations. The Wall Street Crash of 1929 and ensuing Great Depression, caused the collapse of Insull's public utility holding company empire. When Insull's fortune started to fade, he sold both WENR and WBCN along with W9XR, to the National Broadcasting Company in March 1931. Two years after its purchase of the radio stations and the mechanical television station, NBC shut W9XR just as it had done with W9XAP, which came with its purchase of WMAQ (AM).

== Personal life ==
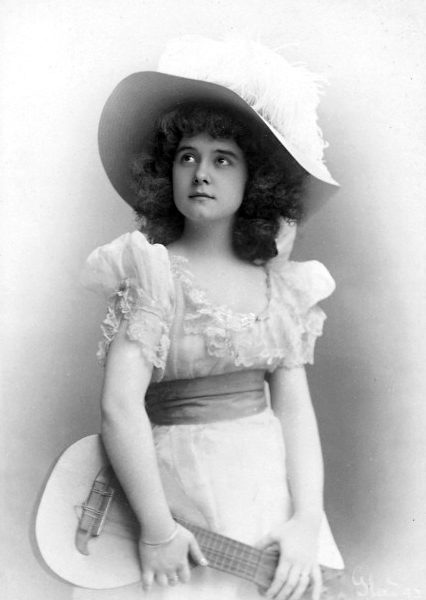
Gladys Wallis, aged 18, in Munsey's Magazine, October 1893

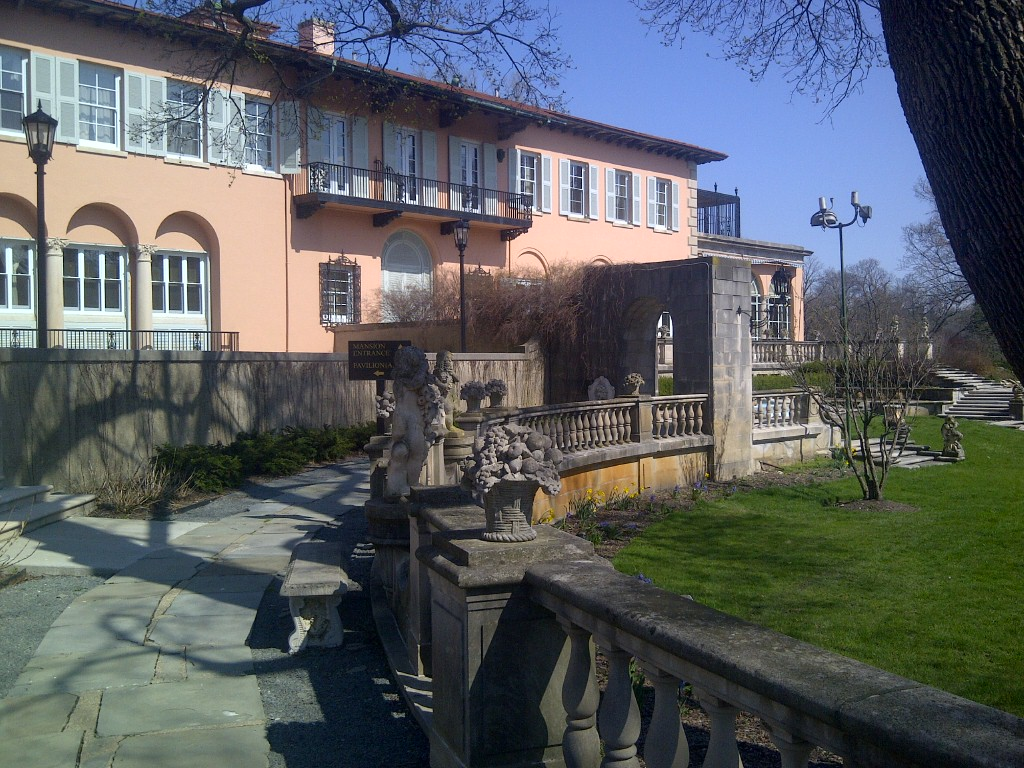
Insull's home in Vernon Hills, Illinois, built 1914–16 (2013)

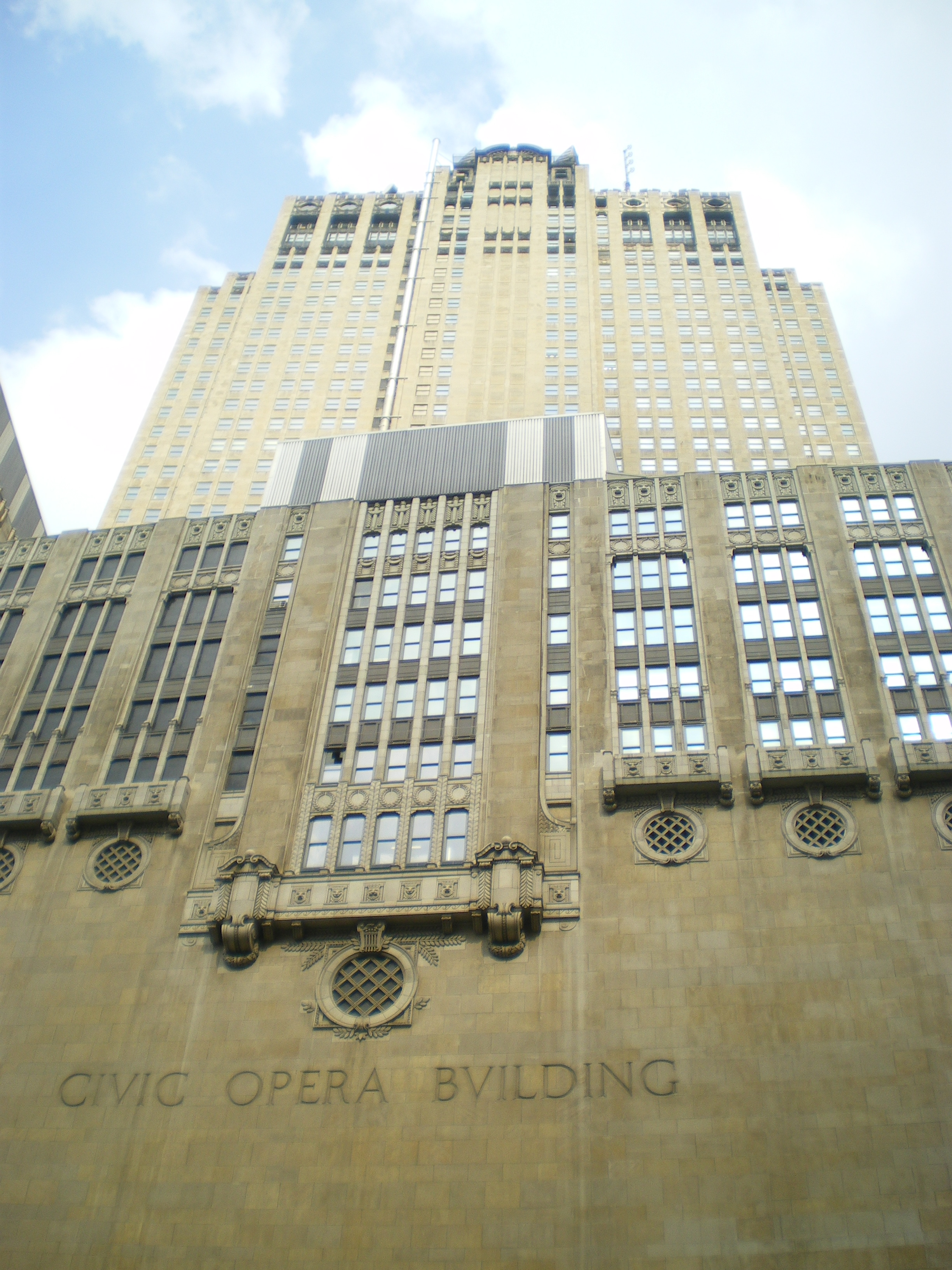
A 2007 photo of Chicago's Civic Opera Building, a 45-story skyscraper built by Insull, completed in 1929

On May 22, 1899, Samuel Insull married an "exquisitely beautiful and clever" Broadway ingénue actress whose stage name was (Alis) Gladys Wallis (1875–September 23, 1953). Her real name was Margaret Anna Bird. Gladys Wallis was popular with New York audiences and appeared in W. H. Crane's company first in the play For Money in 1892 and in his subsequent productions. Gladys played the role of Maggie Rolan in Brother John (1893); a New York Times reviewer listed her as one of the most popular players, one who "deserved quite all the applause [she] received." Prior to her marriage to Insull, Gladys also appeared on the New York stage in On Probation and Worth a Million. At the height of her fame she was interviewed (rather unsuccessfully) by Frank Norris.

At the time of their marriage, Insull was 41 and Gladys was 24. She had been on the stage from childhood. The Insulls lived outside Libertyville, Illinois, in a Mediterranean styled mansion with extensive grounds that later became the Cuneo Museum, in Vernon Hills. They also had an apartment at 1100 North Lake Shore Drive in the city and a furnished suite at the Civic Opera House. The Insulls had one son, Samuel Jr.

Both husband and wife were patrons of the arts. Because of this Insull was instrumental in the building of Chicago's Civic Opera House, which opened November 4, 1929, with Aida. The opera and its cast were chosen by Insull. Samuel Insull was also known for his charitable works in other areas, donating large sums of money to local hospitals, then calling on others with similar resources to do the same. He donated freely to African-American charities in Chicago, asking the wealthy to follow his example. At the time the US entered WWI, Insull was named head of the Illinois Defense Council by President Woodrow Wilson; his efforts sold over a million dollars of War Bonds.

== Great Depression ==
Insull controlled an empire of $500 million with only $27 million in equity. (Due to the highly leveraged structure of Insull's holdings, he is sometimes wrongly credited with the invention of the holding company.) His holding company collapsed during the Great Depression, wiping out the life savings of 600,000 shareholders. The collapse along with the ongoing National Electric Light Association's Federal Trade Commission Investigation of the electric industry led to the enactment of the Public Utility Holding Company Act of 1935. Insull fled the country, initially to France. When the United States asked French authorities that he be extradited, Insull moved to Greece, where there was not yet an extradition treaty with the US. He was later arrested and extradited to the United States by Turkey in 1934 to face federal prosecution on mail fraud and antitrust charges. He was defended by Chicago lawyer Floyd Thompson and found not guilty on all counts.

== Death ==
In July 1938, the Insulls visited Paris to see the Bastille Day festivities. Insull suffered from a heart ailment, and his wife Gladys had asked him not to take the Métro because it was bad for his heart. Nevertheless, Insull had made frequent declarations that he was "now a poor man" and on July 16, 1938, he descended a long flight of stairs at the Place de la Concorde station. He died of a heart attack just as he stepped toward the ticket taker. He had 30 francs in his pocket at the time and was identified by a hotel laundry bill in his pocket. Insull was receiving an annual pension totaling $21,000 from three of his former companies when he died. Insull was buried near his parents on July 23, 1938, in Putney Vale Cemetery, London, the city of his birth. His estate was found to be worth about $1,000 and his debts totaled $14,000,000, according to his will.

== Legacy ==
Insull's legacies included electricity grid systems and the regulated monopoly, a uniquely American institution that included utility companies. This came from a combination of his business persona and his political one. On the one hand, he abhorred the waste of competing power producers, whose inefficiency would often double the cost of production. On the other hand, he believed in the citizen's right to fair treatment. So while he bought up rival companies and created a monopoly, he kept his prices low and campaigned vigorously for regulation.

== In media ==
Often regarded as a fictionalized biography of William Randolph Hearst, Orson Welles's film Citizen Kane is, in part, inspired by the life of Samuel Insull. Welles wrote, "It was a real man who built an opera house for the soprano of his choice, and much in the movie was borrowed from that story." Welles gave Maurice Seiderman a photograph of Insull, with mustache, to use as a model for the makeup design of the old Charles Foster Kane.

Welles denied that the character of Susan Alexander was based on Gladys Wallis, but co-writer Herman J. Mankiewicz did incorporate a related experience into the script. In June 1925, after a 26-year absence, Gladys Wallis Insull returned to the stage in a charity revival of The School for Scandal that ran two weeks in Chicago. When the performance was repeated on Broadway in October 1925, Herman J. Mankiewicz – then the third-string theatre critic for The New York Times – was assigned to review the production. After her opening-night performance in the role of Lady Teazle, drama critic Mankiewicz returned to the press room "full of fury and too many drinks", wrote biographer Richard Meryman:

He was outraged by the spectacle of a 56-year-old millionairess playing a gleeful 18-year-old, the whole production bought for her like a trinket by a man Herman knew to be an unscrupulous manipulator. Herman began to write: "Miss Gladys Wallis, an aging, hopelessly incompetent amateur, opened last night in ..." Then Herman passed out, slumped over the top of his typewriter.

Mankiewicz resurrected the experience in writing the screenplay for Citizen Kane, incorporating it into the narrative of drama critic Jedediah Leland. After Kane's second wife makes her catastrophic opera debut, Leland returns to the press room and passes out over the top of his typewriter after writing the first sentence of his review, "Miss Susan Alexander, a pretty but hopelessly incompetent amateur ... ." Tom Holland plays Insull in the 2017 historical drama film The Current War.

== See also ==
- List of people on the cover of Time (1920s), 29 November 1926
