= Neighbors for Environmental Justice =

- Formation: 2007
- Headquarters: Chicago, Illinois

The Neighbors for Environmental Justice (N4EJ) is an environmental justice group located on Chicago's Southwest Side. N4EJ was founded in 2017, in response to happenings of a local asphalt plant, MAT Asphalt. As an environmental organization, N4EJ focuses its efforts on environmental justice, advocacy, public outreach, and education. Additionally, N4EJ collects environmental data and meets with local officials to discuss the prevention of future developments such as MAT Asphalt.

== History ==
N4EJ was founded in 2007 by a group of community members, including Robert Beedle and Anthony Moser. The organization formed as a response to the development of a hot-mix asphalt plant, MAT Asphalt, located in Chicago's McKinley Park neighborhood. MAT Asphalt neighbors a school, park, and residential units in McKinley Park. Despite community protest, MAT Asphalt has continued their operations. These operations, according to N4EJ, could potentially have harmful effects on lung health, asthma, or worse, as a result of exposure to the dust and fumes the asphalt plant creates. N4EJ is organized by local community members who are concerned about air quality and air pollution. Developments in Chicago, like Mat Asphalt, have undergone controversy regarding air quality violations in the past. In 2020, several complaints were filed against MAT Asphalt due to their failure in controlling airborne particles, foul odors, amongst other complaints. With environmental concerns such as pollution in mind, N4EJ has partnered with other local and community-based environmental organizations including the Chicago Environmental Justice Network (CEJN), which also partners with organizations such as the Southwest Environmental Alliance (SEA), People for Community Recovery (PCR), and the Little Village Environmental Justice Organization (LVEJO).

== Affiliate groups ==
=== Chicago Environmental Justice Network ===
The Chicago Environmental Justice Network (CEJN) is a community-based environmental justice coalition based on Chicago's South and West Sides. CEJN has a proposed mission of remediating environmental concerns, such as pollution, in Chicago residential areas. CJEN is affiliated with other local environmental justice organizations which are concerned with a variety of environmental, social, and economic issues. CJEN and its affiliates include the People for Community Recovery (PCR), the Little Village Environmental Justice Organization (LVEJO), the Southwest Environmental Task Force (SETF), Blacks in Green, and The Neighborhood for Environmental Justice (N4EJ).

=== Southwest Environmental Alliance ===
The Southwest Environmental Alliance (SEA) is a taskforce of environmental advocacy groups located near Chicago's Southwest Side and neighboring industrial corridors.The alliance was founded in 2017. The areas covered by the alliance include Bridgeport, Canaryville, Brighton Park, and McKinley Park neighborhoods. The environmental justice coalition was formed in response to community concerns regarding the industrial pollution in proximity to the Southwest Side. The SEA's stated mission is to improve community health by mitigating the environmental concerns of the surrounding communities in the coalition. SEA focuses its efforts on events that help the environment. An example would be the “Weed the Walk” event in which volunteers walk around learning about plants, animals, and how to take out weeds safely without damaging them. On top of that, SEA also set up dates to meet with electoral officials to discuss developers like Sims Metal Management, who cause harm to the environment.

=== People For Community Recovery ===
Founded in 1979 by Hazel Johnson, People For Community Recovery (PCR) is an environmental justice group located near Altgeld Gardens. PCR was developed as a result of Johnson's concerns regarding the correlation between cancer and toxic waste sites, climate change, equitable economic development, and the overall environmental health of the neighboring communities which border industrial sites. At the community level, PCR has developed or partnered with local programs, such as After School Matters, and Minority Worker training, which is intended for training locals for professions in the food and horticulture professions as well as the construction industry that deals with the management of hazardous waste.

=== Little Village Environmental Justice Organization ===
Little Village Environmental Justice Organization (LVEJO) is a community-based non-profit organization based in the Little Village neighborhood of Chicago. LVEJO was founded in 1994 following the concern of local parents who felt renovations at Joseph E. Gary Elementary might expose students to environmental hazards including pollution from air particulates, which could contribute to asthma and lead poisoning. LVEJO's proposed mission is to promote environmental justice and community empowerment through sustainable community development, community organizing, and advocacy.

LVEJO's work primarily focuses on addressing environmental issues such as air pollution, water quality, and waste management, as well as promoting policies and practices that support social, economic, and environmental justice. Notably, LVEJO played a key role in the successful advocacy for the closure of two coal-fired power plants in the Little Village neighborhood.

The organization offers various programs and services to fulfill its mission, including youth leadership development, community organizing training, and environmental education initiatives. LVEJO also partners with other organizations and community groups to create green infrastructure projects that improve air and water quality in the Little Village neighborhood and beyond.
