= 2018 Little Village fire =

Fire in Chicago, Illinois

Coordinates: 41°51′4″N 87°42′2″W

- Date: August 26, 2018
- Time: 03:00 CDT
- Duration: 60-70 minutes
- Location: Little Village, Chicago, Illinois, U.S.
- Type: Structure fire
- Outcome: Multiple violations found in the apartment complex; Apartment owner appears in court
- Deaths: 10

On August 26, 2018, a fire began early that morning in Chicago's Mexican-American Little Village neighborhood. The fire killed ten children, including six children under the age of 12.

The fire is the deadliest residential fire in Chicago since 1958. In the aftermath of the fire, multiple violations were found in the apartment where the fire occurred with apartment owner, Merced Gutierrez, appearing in court for the 40 violations found at the site of the fire.

== Background ==
On February 22, 2017, a fire occurred in a vacant first-floor apartment at the end of the building, leaving no injuries. In March 2018, Illinois's Department of Children and Family Services investigated a hotline call that claimed that the apartment was hazardous and smelled of marijuana.

== Fire ==
The fire started at around 3 a.m. CDT on August 26, 2018, at an apartment building at 2200 block of South Sacramento Avenue. 45 minutes later, a witness called 911 at 3:45 a.m. to report the fire, which was causing flames to erupt from the second-floor rear unit. Children from the ages of 3 months to 16 years were at a sleepover in the apartment at the time of the fire had occurred.

The investigation by the Chicago Fire Department indicated that the fire was the result of a destroyed item from the fire in the apartment later that morning. Arson and foul play were not considered factors. No adults were present in the apartment during the fire.

The exact cause of the fire was unknown at the time the investigation began. Eight children died at the scene of the fire, and two others were transported in critical condition to John H. Stroger Jr. Hospital of Cook County, where they died in the following days.

== Victims ==
- Amayah Almaraz, 3 months old
- Alanni Ayala, 3
- Gialanni Ayala, 5
- Ariel Garcia, 5
- Giovanni Ayala, 10
- Xavier Contreras, 11
- Nathan Contreras, 13
- Adrian Hernandez, 14
- Cesar Contreras, 14
- Victor Mendoza, 16

== Investigation ==
The initial investigation by the Chicago Fire Department’s Office of Fire Investigations into the February 22, 2017 fire found the second-floor rear unit to be without smoke detectors. After the August, 26 2018 fire, they found a smoke detector without batteries in the unit and changed their statement.

== Aftermath ==
Many criticized the Illinois Department of Children and Family Services as they were previously alerted for the building's hazardous state. In a statement, the department said it tried to prevent neglect when investigating struggling families. In months before the fire, there were 21 complaints against a mother of one of the victims, with one complaint being verified in 2015. The mother was cited for endangerment after one of her daughters committed a crime with an infant relative.

A memorial service for six of the children was held on September 1 at Our Lady of Tepeyac Church.

The Chicago Fire Department handed out smoke detectors to the neighborhood while raising awareness of using the devices to prevent deadly fires.

Mayor Rahm Emanuel in a statement regarding the fire said: "Our thoughts go out to not only the families of those who perished but to members of the department who pushed as hard as possible to reverse the deadly fate of the eight who are now gone".

=== Violations ===
The owner of the apartment, 80 year old Merced Gutierrez, was criticized and blamed for the fire for causing many violations at the apartment. As a result of the violations, Gutierrez appeared in court on August 30 and was ordered to no longer rent anyone the apartment. The city will conduct another inspection on December 4 with another hearing on the code violations is set two days later.

== See also ==
- Our Lady of the Angels School fire
