= Moreno's Liquors =

Spirits retailer in Chicago, Illinois, USA

- Type: Private
- Industry: Retail (alcoholic beverages)
- Founded: May 21, 1977
- Founders: Michael Moreno Sr. Rose Moreno
- Headquarters: Chicago, Illinois, U.S.
- Key people: Michael Moreno Sr. Mike Moreno Jr.
- Products: Tequila, mezcal, craft beer
- Subsidiaries: Osito's Tap
- Website: morenosliquors.com

Moreno's Liquors is a family-owned liquor store located in the Little Village neighborhood of Chicago, Illinois. The business was founded in 1977 by Michael Moreno Sr. and Rose Moreno. The store is known for carrying a large selection of agave-based spirits, including tequila and mezcal.

== History ==
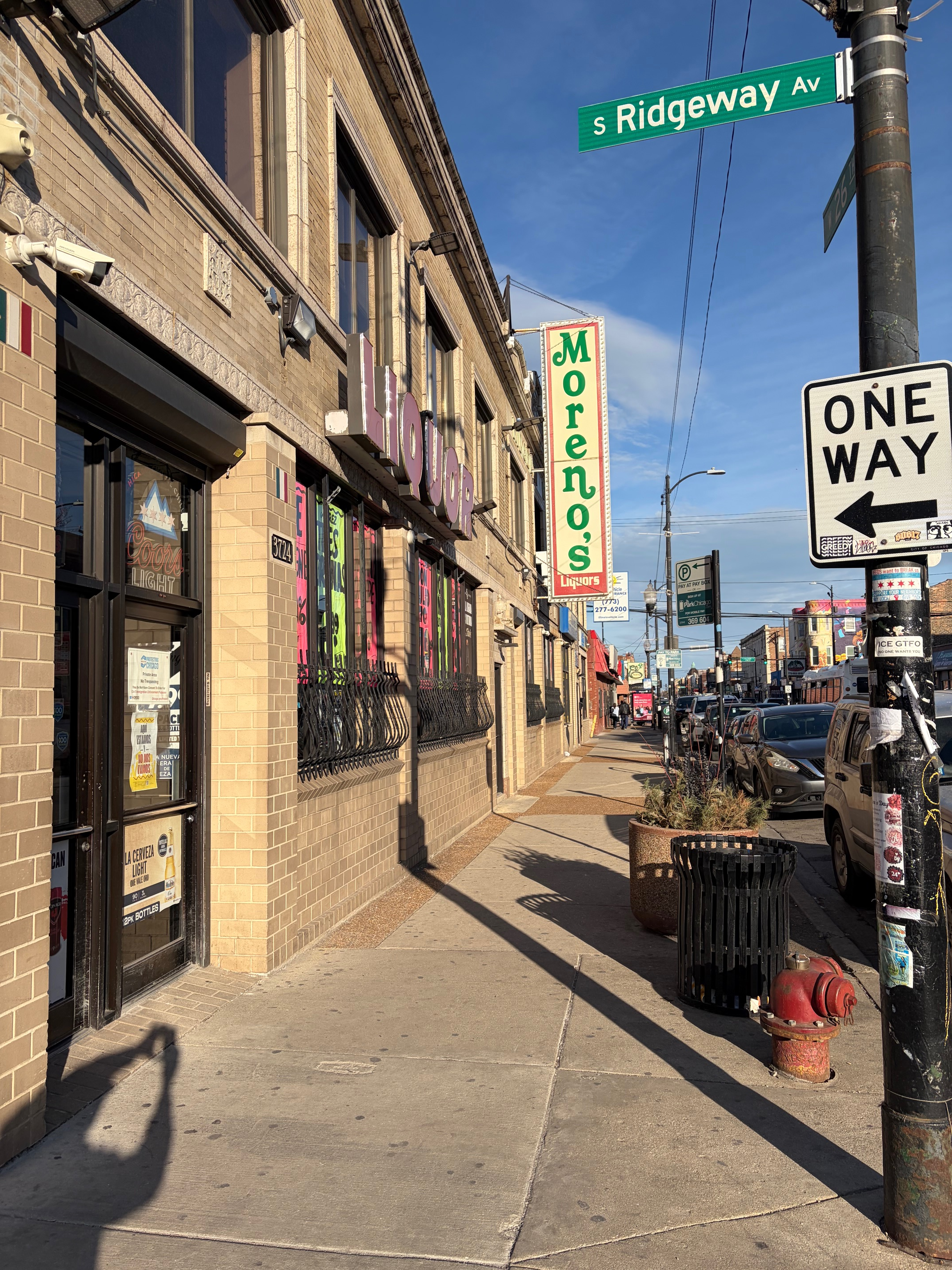
Moreno's Liquors

Moreno's Liquors was founded on May 21, 1977, by Michael Moreno Sr. and Rose Moreno in Little Village. The original store was located at the corner of 26th Street and Harding. In its early years, the business primarily sold beer and spirits imported for Mexican and Latin American markets.

In 1987, the store relocated to a larger 14,000-square-foot location at 3724 West 26th Street. Around this time, Moreno Sr. advocated for the introduction of several premium Mexican tequila brands to the United States market. Industry publications have described this period as part of a broader shift toward higher-end agave spirits in the U.S.

During the early 2010s, the business adjusted its focus in response to competition from large retail chains, placing greater emphasis on specialty and small-batch spirits. By 2013, the store had expanded its selection of niche and imported products.

Mike Moreno Jr. joined the company as vice president in 2014. Under his tenure, the store expanded its craft beer offerings and increased the number of agave-based spirits in its inventory.

=== Osito's Tap ===
In 2019, the Moreno family opened Osito's Tap, a bar connected to the retail store. The bar occupies a nearby historic greystone building that previously operated as a Bohemian tavern. The project received partial funding from the Chicago Neighborhood Opportunity Fund and followed the removal of a local liquor license moratorium in Little Village.

While the store historically served customers primarily from Little Village and nearby neighborhoods such as Pilsen, its customer base has expanded to include visitors from other parts of the Chicago metropolitan area.

== Products and services ==
=== Agave spirits ===
The store carries a variety of Mexican regional spirits, including sotol, bacanora, raicilla, and comiteco. It also operates a single-barrel selection program in which the owners select tequila barrels from distilleries in Mexico for exclusive bottlings.

=== Educational events ===
Moreno's Liquors hosts tasting events and seminars related to agave-based spirits and produces online educational content about these products. Mike Moreno Jr. has also been consulted by several publications for spirits-related guides.

== Community involvement and advocacy ==
Local media and business organizations have described Moreno's Liquors as a long-standing retailer in the Little Village commercial corridor. Michael Moreno Sr. co-founded the Little Village Chamber of Commerce and later served as its second president.

Mike Moreno Jr. has served as a commissioner of the chamber and as chairman of Chicago Special Service Area #25. He has also been involved with nonprofit organizations including Esperanza, Junior Achievement, and Global Brigades.

Local reporting has also highlighted the store's informal role as a neighborhood gathering point during the downturn, describing owner Michael Moreno Sr. quietly assisting customers facing financial hardship.

=== Policy advocacy ===
Members of the Moreno family have publicly commented on policy issues affecting small businesses in Chicago. In 2017, they opposed the Cook County sweetened beverage tax, arguing that it negatively affected small retailers. They also advocated for lifting local liquor moratoria in Little Village, which allowed for the opening of new hospitality businesses such as Osito's Tap.

In 2025 and 2026, Michael Moreno Sr. and Mike Moreno Jr. spoke publicly about the economic impact of federal immigration enforcement on businesses along the 26th Street commercial corridor. Following reports of a decline in sales associated with a late-2025 enforcement operation, Mike Moreno Jr. provided testimony and media commentary about the effects of immigration policy on local retail activity.
