= Our Lady of Tepeyac High School =

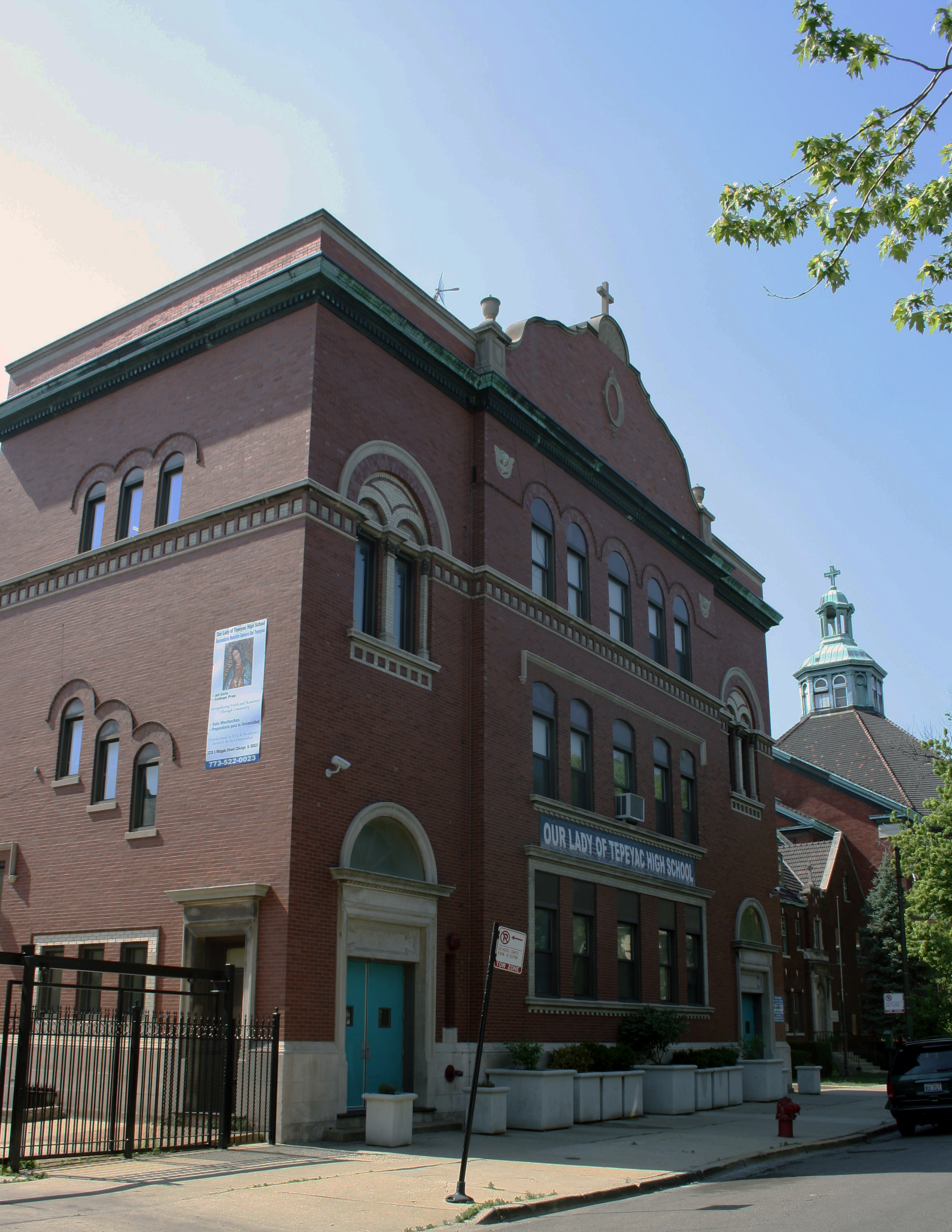

Location
- 2228 South Whipple Street; Chicago, Illinois 60623; U.S. 41.8516°N 87.702°W

Information
- Type: Private
- Motto: Strengthening Faith and Academics; Through Community
- Religious affiliation: Roman Catholic Archdiocese of Chicago
- Patron saint: Our Lady of Guadalupe
- Established: 1927
- CEEB code: 141-132
- NCES School ID: 00344427
- Principal: Kathleen Ingram
- Grades: 9–12
- Gender: Female
- Enrollment: 143 (2012)
- Student to teacher ratio: 16:1
- Campus type: Urban
- Colors: Royal Blue and White
- Athletics conference: Chicago Prep Conference
- Mascot: Tiger
- Team name: Tigers
- Accreditation: Illinois State Board of Education, North Central Association of Colleges and Schools
- School fees: $90
- Tuition: $4,900

Our Lady of Tepeyac High School, previously known as St. Casimir High School, is a private, American all-girls school. The school is located in the Little Village neighborhood of Chicago, Illinois and operates within the Roman Catholic Archdiocese of Chicago. The Roman Catholic school is accredited by the Illinois State Board of Education and the North Central Association of Colleges and Schools.

== Background ==
In 1890, Roman Catholic bishop, Patrick Feehan, established a new parish church in the South Lawndale area of Chicago. Primarily settled by Polish Catholics, the church was named in honor of St. Casimir, the patron saint of Poland. The following year, St. Ludmilla Parish was established adjacent to Saint Casimir, in order to serve an influx of Czech Catholics moving into the area. In 1927, St. Casimir Parish established St. Casimir High School, located at Cermak Road and Whipple Street. The school offered a variety of college preparatory classes exclusively for young women.

At the school's centennial in 1990, St. Casimir Parish restructured and merged with St. Ludmilla Parish. While St. Casimir Parish retained oversight of the high school located at Cermak and Whipple, the name of the school was changed to Our Lady of Tepeyac High School, in recognition of the growing Hispanic culture, which had long absorbed the Polish community. The name of the new school was made in honor of the appearance of Our Lady of Guadalupe on the slopes of the Hill of Tepeyac in Mexico City. Our Lady of Guadalupe is one of the most popular religious and cultural icons in Mexico.

== Demographics ==
Our Lady of Tepeyac High School provides educational opportunities exclusively for female students in the Chicago area. As of 2012, there are 143 students attending the school, with 80.4 percent Latina, 16.1 percent African American, 2.8 percent multiracial, and .7 percent Caucasian. Eighty-six percent of the students families fall below the poverty line.

Our Lady of Tepeyac High School is an integral part of the Little Village community. Once home to Eastern European immigrants, Little Village is now considered one of the largest Mexican American communities in the country. The two public high schools in the neighborhood average a 45 percent graduation rate. For the past three years, 100 percent of our graduates have enrolled in college.

== Accreditation ==
Our Lady of Tepeyac High School is accredited by the Illinois State Board of Education and by the North Central Association of Colleges and Schools.

== Curriculum ==
Honors classes are offered in English, Algebra, Biology, Geometry, History, Chemistry, and Algebra II. Physics and PreCalculus encompass the honors-level science and math courses for seniors. In 2007, the school began offering an AP English Literature course for honors-level seniors, and in the fall of 2011, they began offering an AP Spanish Literature course to juniors and seniors.

== Tuition ==
The total cost of educating a student is $8,300 per year. Every student will automatically receive a grant to cover the difference. Tuition for the school year is $4,900 per student. Our Lady of Tepeyac has a fundraiser every year. Their fundraising rate is $200 per student. Students raise this money by selling raffle tickets. Each student is given a certain number of tickets to sell and is also given a time limit. Their registration fee is $200 per student (non-refundable). Our Lady of Tepeyac orders books every year for the incoming students and can be sold to approximately $250 in total. Scholarship awards of $1,500 granted to the top ten scorers on the entrance exam. Awardees will be notified by mail after acceptance. Only students who test in January are eligible for an Academic Scholarship. Family Discounts: $300 discount for the high school student's total tuition if the family has at least one child at Our Lady of Tepeyac grade school.

== Sports ==
Our Lady of Tepeyac offers volleyball, basketball, soccer, and softball.

== Clubs ==
Our Lady of Tepeyac offers different clubs, including cooking, art, film critique, computer building, history, creative writing, environmental, board game, and dance.
