= Bridgeport News =

American non-partisan, independent newspaper

- Type: Weekly newspaper
- Format: Broadsheet
- Publisher: Joseph Feldman
- Editor: Janice Racinowski
- Founded: 1939
- Headquarters: Chicago, Illinois, United States
- Circulation: 25,300

The Bridgeport News is an American weekly community, non-partisan independent newspaper that serves the Chicago neighborhoods of Bridgeport, Canaryville, Armour Square, Chinatown, McKinley Park and Dearborn Park. The paper functions largely as a community news/announcements publication with numerous classified and display advertisements. The newspaper is distributed free door to door in their circulation boundaries of 22nd on the North/49th Street on the South/The Dan Ryan Expressway on the East/Western Ave. on the West every Wednesday. Prior to 2020, the full publication was available online at their website www.bridgeportnews.org.

The newspaper was founded in 1939. It has been serving the community for over 75 years with a weekly certified circulation of 25,300 copies delivered free to homes and businesses.
