= Little Village Lawndale High School Campus =

Coordinates: 41°50′6.6″N 87°44′9.0″W

Location
- 3120 S Kostner Ave; Chicago, Illinois 60623; United States

Information
- School type: Public Secondary
- Established: 2005
- School district: City of Chicago School District
- Principal: Maria Gamboa (Multicultural Arts); Omar Chilous (Social Justice); Brian Joseph Rogers (World Language); Erin walker (Infinity)
- Grades: 9-12
- Enrollment: 270 (Muticultural Arts); 326 (Social Justice); 341 (World Language); 419 (Infinity)
- Campus type: Urban
- Colors: Green; Red; Purple; Blue
- Athletics conference: Chicago Public League
- Nickname: Phoenix
- Website: Little Village Lawndale High School Campus

Little Village Lawndale High School Campus is a public high school located in the South Lawndale neighborhood of Chicago, Illinois. The campus contains four autonomous small schools with some shared facilities. LVLHS has a unique campus design that reflects its original inception from a hunger strike in 2001. In 2001, 14 parents and grandparents staged a 19-day hunger strike to urge politicians to fulfill promises to build a high school in the child and adolescent dense Little Village neighborhood.

== Schools ==
Each of the four schools within the campus has its own particular focus: the Multicultural Academy of Scholarship High School; the Infinity Math, Science and Technology High School aims to prepare students for jobs requiring strong math, science and technological skills; the World Language High School promotes bilingualism, biculturalism, and learning through the world's languages; and the Social Justice High School's curriculum emphasizes the struggle for social justice.

== History ==
Over Mother's Day weekend in 2001, 14 parents and grandparents organized a hunger strike to demand the construction of a high school that had been promised to the community but remained unfunded. While Paul Vallas, the CEO of Chicago Public Schools, initially refused to meet with the hunger strikers, by the end of the first week, he visited their tent to negotiate terms. The hunger strike lasted 19 days and increased public pressure on the school district to fund the project. In August 2001, the newly appointed CEO of Chicago Public Schools Arne Duncan reallocated funds to begin construction on the school. Community members continued to advocate for participation in designing the new school, and door-to-door parent surveys contributed to the curricular focus of each school on the campus.

In April 2025, an NBC 5 investigation uncovered how a former dean of the school is one of seven educators who have been fired or resigned since 2017 from Little Village Lawndale High School amid allegations of serious misconduct.

== Athletics ==
Students at Little Village Lawndale High School may participate on ten different sports teams, as well as a cheerleading squad. The sports teams are made up of students from all four schools. Track, basketball, cross country, soccer, swimming and diving, volleyball, wrestling, and softball are available to both boys and girls. There are also boys' teams in football and baseball.
