= Fisk Generating Station =

Decommissioned electric power generating plant

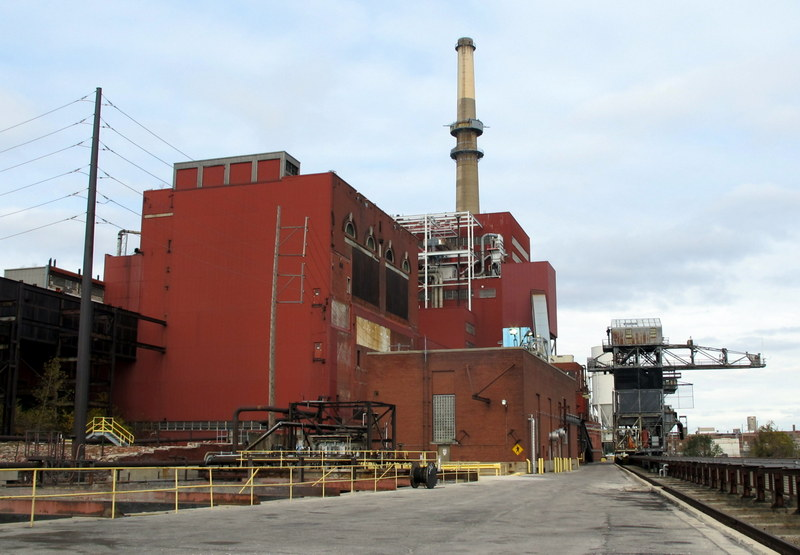
- Country: United States
- Location: Pilsen neighborhood of Chicago
- Coordinates: 41°51′01″N 87°39′12″W
- Status: Decommissioned
- Commission date: 1968 (current units)
- Decommission date: 2012
- Owner: Midwest Generation

Thermal power station
- Primary fuel: Subbituminous coal, kerosene
- Turbine technology: Steam (coal), Combustion turbine (kerosene)
- Cooling source: Chicago River

Power generation
- Nameplate capacity: 590 MW

The Fisk Generating Station, also known as Fisk Street Generating Station or Fisk Station, is an inactive medium-size, coal-fired electric generating station located at 1111 West Cermak Road in the Pilsen neighborhood of Chicago, Illinois. It was sited near the south branch of the Chicago River to provide access to water for steam and barge traffic for coal, and closed down in 2012.

== History ==
=== Origin ===
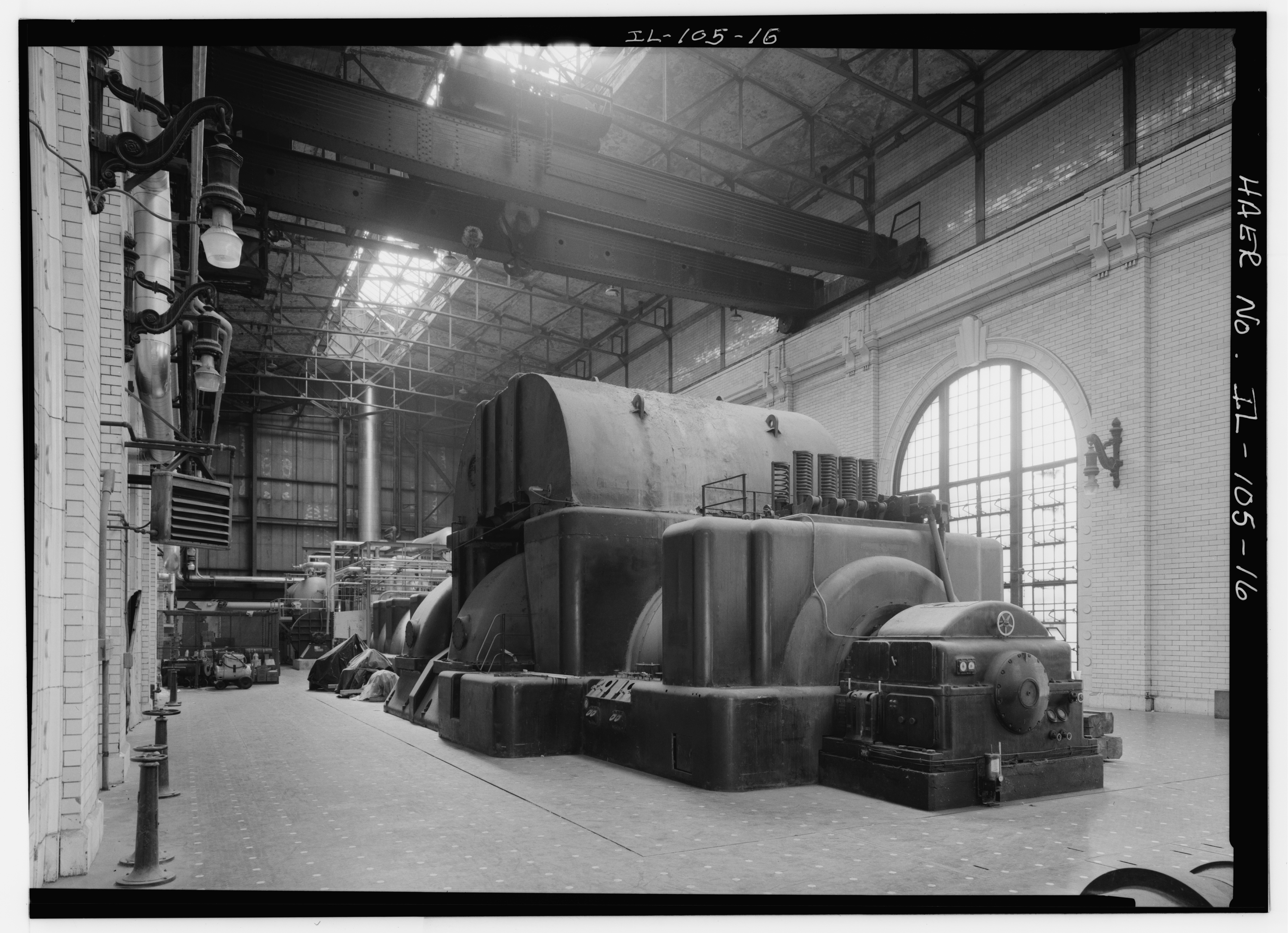
Interior of the 1903 Powerhouse showing Unit 18

Fisk Street Station went into service October 2, 1903. It was built by the predecessor to Commonwealth Edison, Chicago Edison Company, whose Chairman was Samuel Insull and Chief Engineer was Frederick Sargent. The older Harrison Street Station, built on the west bank of the Chicago River with reciprocating engines and condensing units capable of 16,200 kilowatts, was overloaded less than six years after the station went into service in 1894. Fisk's original Unit 1 was an 11,000 horsepower - 5000 kilowatt (or 5 million watt abbreviated 5 MW) steam turbo-generator built by the General Electric Company, whose Chairman Charles A. Coffin initially balked at the size requested by Insull. It was far larger than any other steam turbine built up to that date, the next biggest being a 1,500 kilowatt Westinghouse unit installed by the Hartford Electric Light Company around 1900. General Electric had manufactured some 600 kilowatt turbine units by that time. Insull and Coffin reached a compromise; GE would assume the manufacturing risk and Chicago Edison would pay for the installation. Insull told Coffin: "I will make no claim against you..all you have to do is take the apparatus out and throw it in the junk pile."

=== Engineering design and significance ===
Fisk Station's mechanical success was immediately apparent, as the new unit produced twice as much power as any steam engine ever built. The turbines achieved 80% energy efficiency, twice Chicago Edison's previous reciprocating unit technology at Harrison Street. They also spun ten times faster than the reciprocating units, were one-tenth the weight, and required less maintenance. The turbine proved to be an engineering wonder since its blades were the first man-made devices to move faster than the speed of sound. It made electricity more available, more reliable and cheaper. The original 5 MW turbine (1903) was returned to the Schenectady, New York headquarters of General Electric, "where it stands today as a monument to engineering genius." This 5 MW Curtis turbine generator unit was designated a national engineering landmark by the American Society of Mechanical Engineers in 1975. Fisk Station (the "Street" was dropped after Chicago changed the street name of Fisk to Carpenter in 1937) continued to be a leader in electricity generation. In 1914 another pioneering engineering feat was implemented: horizontally shafted turbines replaced the vertical units. The horizontal orientation allowed the station foundations to support larger, faster spinning turbines. Electrical World, a trade magazine, waxed eloquently in 1908 on the plant's long standing significance: "No article can do justice to the care and thought bestowed on it, or to the completeness and beauty of the whole. It is a great cathedral, devoted to the religion of power, and a feeling of worship is inspired by the gigantic machines, the towering walls, the long-drawn aisles"

=== Midwest Generation purchase ===
In 1999, Midwest Generation, a subsidiary of Edison Mission Energy, paid $4.8 billion to acquire seven fossil-fuel generating plants and five peaker plants from Commonwealth Edison's corporate parent. With this purchase, Midwest Generation took over operation of the Fisk station as well as Crawford, Waukegan, Powerton (Pekin), Joliet (two) and Will County (Romeoville) stations.

=== Strike ===
The International Brotherhood of Electrical Workers (IBEW) had represented workers at Commonwealth Edison generating plants since World War II, after a company-dominated representative group, called the Utility Employees Union, was deemed illegitimate by the NLRB in 1942. In June 2001, IBEW Local Union 15, with approximately 1,150 members working at seven fossil fuel generating stations throughout Illinois, went on strike against Midwest Generation when contract negotiations broke down. After two months, Local 15 members voted on August 31 to return to their jobs. The union made an unconditional offer to return to work while still negotiating an agreement.
"Some of the guys were hurting financially, that's why we voted to go back to work," said Tom O'Reilly, Ass't Business Manager for Local 15. "We have no intention of agreeing with the company's current proposal." Midwest rejected that offer and locked out all of its workers who honored the picket line at the time IBEW Local 15 made the offer to return. Faced with a lockout, the union accepted Midwest Generation's contract offer and the locked-out employees returned to work nearly seven weeks later under the terms of a new agreement which was less favorable to employees.

Immediately after the company instituted the lockout, IBEW Local 15 filed an unfair labor practice charge with Region 13 claiming that the lockout was unlawful. The case was submitted to the NLRB's Division of Advice and in March 2002, the Regional Director for Region 13 issued a complaint against Midwest Generation. The complaint alleged that the lockout unlawfully targeted employees based on their union activity because the company permitted employees to continue to work during the lockout if they had not struck, or if they had ceased to participate in the strike prior to the union's unconditional offer to return.

The case was transferred to the NLRB in May 2002 and in September 2004, by a 2–1 panel vote, the George Bush-appointed Board found that Midwest Generation had not violated the NLRA. In October 2005, the US Court of Appeals for the Seventh Circuit reversed the Board's decision and remanded the case back to the Board with instructions to find that the lockout violated Section 8(a)(1) and (3) of the Act because it unlawfully targeted employees based on their union activity. With respect to the remedy, the Seventh Circuit directed the Board to consider whether the lockout coerced the employees into accepting the contract offer, thereby voiding the agreement. In 2006, the Supreme Court declined to hear Midwest Generation's appeal.

In March 2008, the Board accepted the Seventh Circuit's remand and ordered that the employees who were locked out be made whole for the period of the lockout. In addition, the Board remanded the case to an administrative law judge to consider voiding the contract. In the meantime, Midwest Generation and IBEW Local 15 had successfully negotiated a successor collective bargaining agreement that replaced the contract from the 2001 negotiations.

Chief Judge Giannasi oversaw extensive settlement talks that resulted in a global settlement of all issues related to the lockout, including the potential contract voiding issue. The parties worked cooperatively to calculate the losses that employees suffered as a direct result of the lockout. In November 2008, the parties agreed upon approximately $16 million in backpay and other damages, including 401(k) and other reimbursable losses.

=== Shutdown ===
Fisk Station ceased operations in August 2012, due to competition from natural gas-fired power and environmental regulations that were soon to take effect.

On December 17, 2012, Edison Mission Energy – parent company of Midwest Generation, and operator of numerous power plants in Illinois and other states – filed for Chapter 11 bankruptcy protection. The company said it had been challenged by depressed energy prices and high fuel costs affecting its coal-fired plants, combined with pending debt maturities and the need to retrofit its coal-fired facilities to comply with environmental regulations.

Fisk Station was among the plants named in a 2002 Harvard School of Public Health study which found communities near these older coal power plants showed significant health risks such as increased mortality and asthma rates. Midwest Generation's Crawford Generating Station in the Little Village neighborhood was also named in the study. Both plants were marked for closure.

=== Accidents ===
The IBEW Local Union 15 Workers Memorial lists at least six workers who died as a result of workplace accidents at Fisk Station:

- Peter J. Gregor, 35-year-old foreman was fatally burned on February 2, 1937.
- Robert A. Hurtienne, a 55-year-old station electrician fell from a ladder on October 15, 1938.
- Floyd Coleman, a 63-year-old boiler operator was fatally burned on July 11, 1945.
- Terrance Lennon, 56 years old, and William E. Kenny, 33 years old, electricians, were both fatally burned October 19, 1954.
- Matthew J. Wynne Jr., a 23-year-old substation construction mechanic, suffered a fatal accident on January 26, 1974.

On November 21, 1976 41-year-old Chicago firefighter Walter Watroba lost his life after being pinned for seven hours by a fallen coal chute. Watroba died shortly after his leg was amputated in order to extricate him. Three hundred firefighters had responded to a fire that started at Throop Street where a coal chute conveyor emerged from an underground passage. The fire spread along the coal conveyor to a control room, switch house, boiler and turbine buildings and caused $8 million in damages.

== Units ==
In addition to the main coal-fired unit, the station had a number of kerosene-fired back-up units:

Unit	Nameplate capacity (MWe)	Commissioning	Notes
19	374	1968	Main coal-fired unit (retired)
311	38	1968	Kerosene-fired unit (back-up)
312	38	1968	Kerosene-fired unit (back-up)
321	38	1968	Kerosene-fired unit (back-up)
322	38	1968	Kerosene-fired unit (back-up)
331	38	1968	Kerosene-fired unit (back-up)
332	38	1968	Kerosene-fired unit (back-up)
341	38	1968	Kerosene-fired unit (back-up)
342	22.8	1968	Kerosene-fired unit (back-up)

== See also ==
- List of power stations in Illinois
