= Crawford Station =

Chicago coal-fired power plant (1925–2012)

Crawford Generating Station
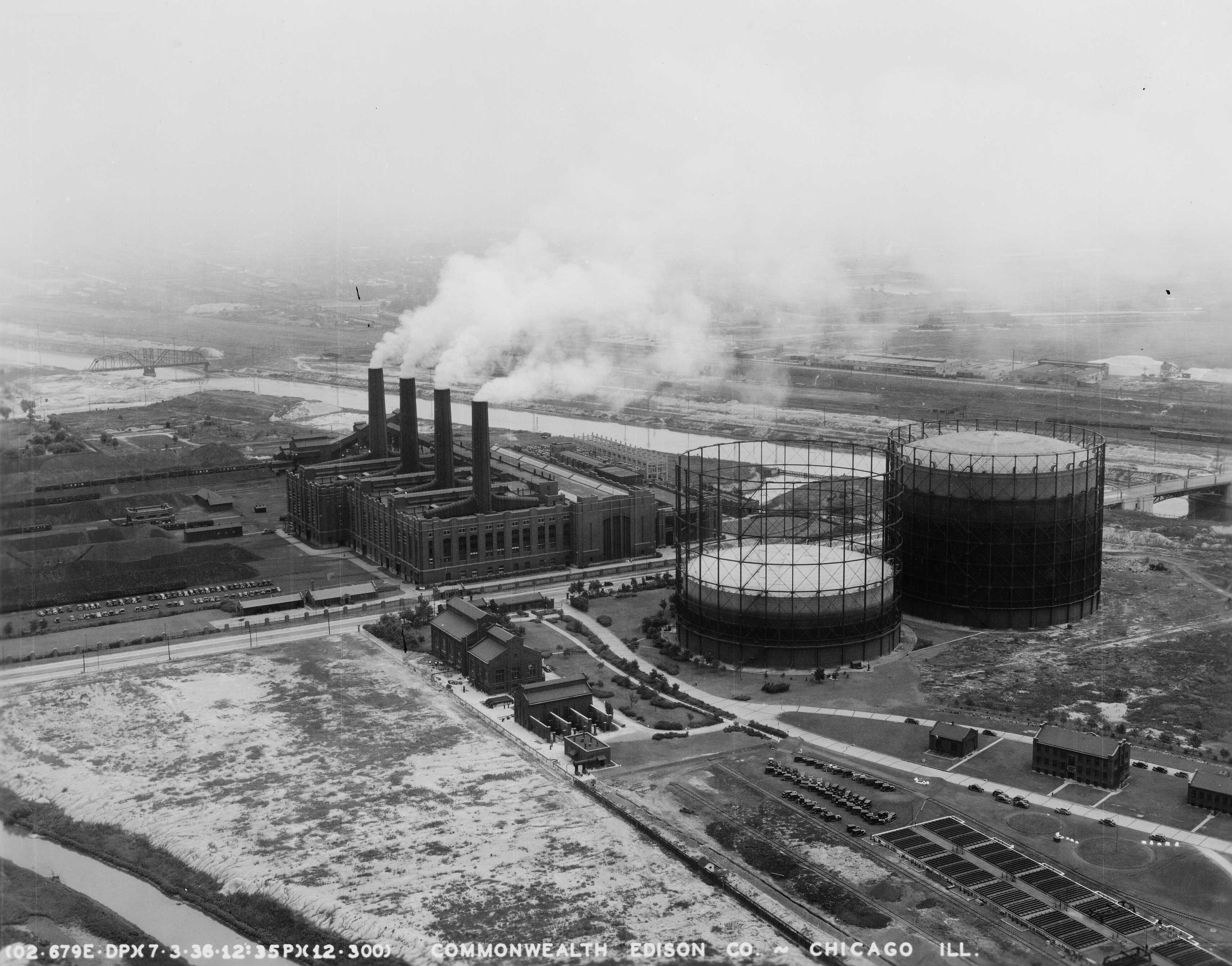
- Crawford Station (1936)
- Country: United States
- Location: South Lawndale neighborhood of Chicago
- Coordinates: 41°49′43″N 87°43′22″W
- Status: Decommissioned
- Decommission date: 2012
- Owner: Midwest Generation

Power generation
- Nameplate capacity: 805 MW

External links
- Commons: Related media on Commons

Crawford Generating Station was a coal−fired power plant built in 1924. It was located in the South Lawndale community of Chicago, Illinois.

It was closed in 2012 after a long battle with the community over pollution, like the nearby Fisk Generating Station. Both stations were owned and operated by Midwest Generation, a subsidiary of Edison International. Crawford and Fisk Stations were among the last standing coal generating facilities within a major U.S. city at their time of retirement. Demolition of the plant began in 2019.

== History ==
Crawford Station was designed by architects Graham, Anderson, Probst & White, the successor of the firm that designed Union Station, Soldier Field, The Field Museum, and The Merchandise Mart. The station sat on a 72-acre area consisting of buildings and power generating infrastructure and provided storage for over 300,000 tons of coal. The plant's architectural style has been termed "Industrial Gothic" and makes use of red-brick and stonework masonry, Modern Gothic forms, and renaissance-revival detailing.

The station began operation in 1925. At the time it was the largest of five generating stations that served the city of Chicago, producing a capacity of 750,000 kilowatts. The station was acquired by Midwest Generation when the company was founded in 1999. Midwest Generation also owned and operated the nearby Fisk Generating Station.

=== Accidents ===
The IBEW Local 15 Workers Memorial lists five workers who died as a result of workplace accidents at Crawford Station.

Ralph A. Johnson, a Turbine Operator with twelve years of service was fatally burned on Monday November 17, 1941. The forty-five-year-old Johnson suffered scalding burns to his hands, arms and face while working on top of a water box condenser. He was buried at Oak Hill Cemetery in Cook County, Illinois.

Andrea Basso, a forty-eight-year-old Conveyor Attendant was crushed to death by a coal conveyor belt on Saturday November 3, 1945. Basso started his service at Calumet Station in 1923 and transferred to Crawford in 1932. Survived by his spouse Anna Costa, daughters Iole and Gidia, son Andrea John, the forty-eight-year-old Italian immigrant was buried at St. Mary Cemetery in Cook County.

Michael J. O'Brien, a Boiler Mechanic with twenty-nine years of service was working from a sitting position on a scaffold with his legs hanging over the side on Wednesday November 29, 1950. He either fell from the sitting position or fell when he attempted to rise. O'Brien, sixty years old, died because of a fall from the elevated height. He was interred at Mount Olivet Cemetery in Cook County.

Centerville Scott, a Boiler Cleaner with thirty-one years of service, was killed because of a twelve foot fall through an opening in the grating on Monday November 30, 1953. The sixty-year-old World War I veteran, who had served in the 816th U.S. Pioneer Infantry, was buried at Lincoln Cemetery in Cook County.

Donald A. Noah, Sr. a forty-one-year-old Senior Mechanic was fatally injured at work on Monday January 30, 1995. He collapsed while working in a condenser with another employee who required hospitalization. A Cook County Medical Examiner's spokesman said an autopsy showed that Noah died of lack of oxygen. Noah's survivors included four children and his mother, Jean. He is interred at Mt. Greenwood Cemetery in Cook County.

=== Closing ===
Crawford Station was closed in 2012 because owner Midwest Generation determined that the needed environmental retrofits to meet federal air standards were financially impractical.

The International Brotherhood of Electrical Workers (IBEW) had represented workers at Commonwealth Edison generating plants since World War II, after a company-dominated representative group, called the Utility Employees Union, was deemed illegitimate by the NLRB in 1942.

=== Strike ===
In June 2001, IBEW Local Union 15, with approximately 1,150 members working at seven fossil fuel generating stations throughout Illinois, went on strike against Midwest Generation when contract negotiations broke down. After two months, Local 15 members voted on August 31 to return to their jobs. The union made an unconditional offer to return to work while still negotiating an agreement.

"Some of the guys were hurting financially, that's why we voted to go back to work," said Tom O'Reilly, Ass't Business Manager for Local 15. "We have no intention of agreeing with the company's current proposal." Midwest rejected that offer and locked out all of its workers who honored the picket line at the time IBEW Local 15 made the offer to return. Faced with a lockout, the union accepted Midwest Generation's contract offer and the locked-out employees returned to work nearly seven weeks later under the terms of a new agreement which was less favorable to employees.

Immediately after the company instituted the lockout, IBEW Local 15 filed an unfair labor practice charge with Region 13 claiming that the lockout was unlawful. The case was submitted to the NLRB's Division of Advice and in March 2002, the Regional Director for Region 13 issued a complaint against Midwest Generation. The complaint alleged that the lockout unlawfully targeted employees based on their union activity because the company permitted employees to continue to work during the lockout if they had not struck, or if they had ceased to participate in the strike prior to the union's unconditional offer to return.

The case was transferred to the NLRB in May 2002 and in September 2004, by a 2–1 panel vote, the George W. Bush-appointed Board found that Midwest Generation had not violated the NLRA. In October 2005, the US Court of Appeals for the Seventh Circuit reversed the Board's decision and remanded the case back to the Board with instructions to find that the lockout violated Section 8(a)(1) and (3) of the Act because it unlawfully targeted employees based on their union activity. With respect to the remedy, the Seventh Circuit directed the Board to consider whether the lockout coerced the employees into accepting the contract offer, thereby voiding the agreement. In 2006, the Supreme Court declined to hear Midwest Generation's appeal.

In March 2008, the Board accepted the Seventh Circuit's remand and ordered that the employees who were locked out be made whole for the period of the lockout. In addition, the Board remanded the case to an administrative law judge to consider voiding the contract. In the meantime, Midwest Generation and IBEW Local 15 had successfully negotiated a successor collective bargaining agreement that replaced the contract from the 2001 negotiations.

Chief Judge Giannasi oversaw extensive settlement talks that resulted in a global settlement of all issues related to the lockout, including the potential contract voiding issue. The parties worked cooperatively to calculate the losses that employees suffered as a direct result of the lockout. In November 2008, the parties agreed upon approximately $16 million in backpay and other damages, including 401(k) and other reimbursable losses.

=== Demolition ===
Demolition of the plant began in 2019. On December 30, 2019, a worker fell to his death, and demolition was halted. The wife of the deceased worker has filed a lawsuit against the developers of the site, Hilco Redevelopment Partners. Demolition work resumed on January 16, 2020. On April 11, 2020, the concrete smokestack was imploded, blanketing the Little Village neighborhood with toxic dust. Mayor Lori Lightfoot issued a stop work order, and a class action lawsuit was filed on behalf of residents whose health may have been harmed. On May 5, 2020, Illinois Attorney General Kwame Raoul filed suit against Hilco and its demolition contractors MCM Management Corp and Controlled Demolition Inc. for violating state pollution laws.

== Emission reductions ==
Crawford Station reduced sulfur dioxide (SO2) emissions by 30% and nitrogen oxide (NOx) emissions by 48% in 2001 through the purchase of lower sulfur coal and the installation of new technologies.

In 2005, the U.S. Department of Energy funded a mercury control project to test Activated Carbon Injection technology at Crawford Station. Crawford become one of the first coal-fired power plants in the country to install permanent mercury controls in 2008. The new technology removed mercury by 90%. Controls to reduce nitrogen oxide (NOx) emissions by 70% were installed in 2011.

== Station records ==
- 2004: Crawford Unit 7 achieves a 108-day record for the longest continuous run.
- 2005: Record for equivalent forced outage rate at 2.30%.
- 2007: Crawford Unit 8 achieves a record run of 104 consecutive days. The station also reaches one year injury-free.
- 2008: Achieves a top safety performance in the Midwest Generation station fleet after have no Days Away, Restricted Duty or Transfer (DART) injuries.
- 2009: The station sets its all-time safety record after two years without a lost work-day accident.
- 2010: Record for equivalent availability at 92.89%.
- 2012: Achieves one year injury-free.

== Gallery ==
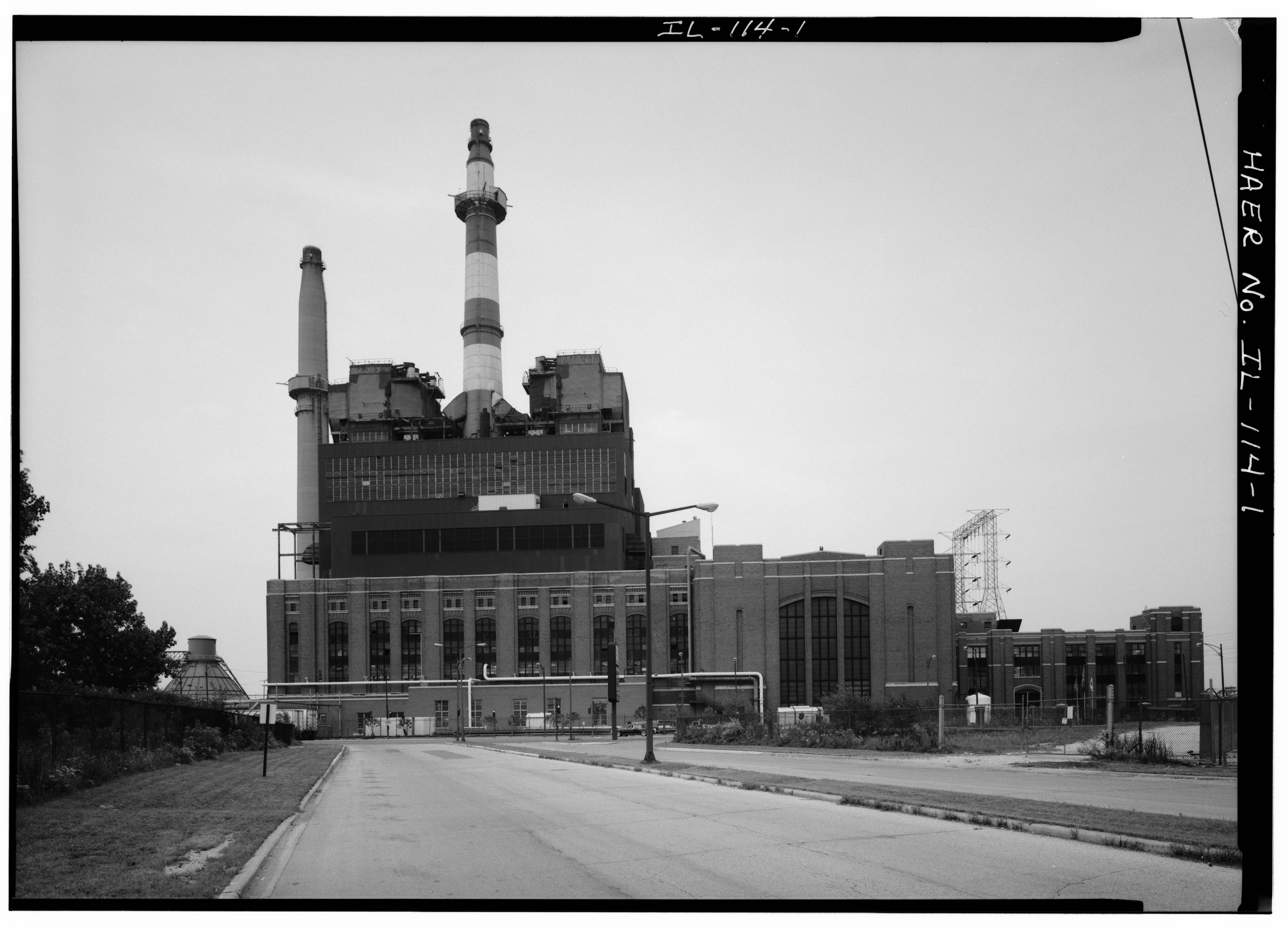
Crawford Station (1987)

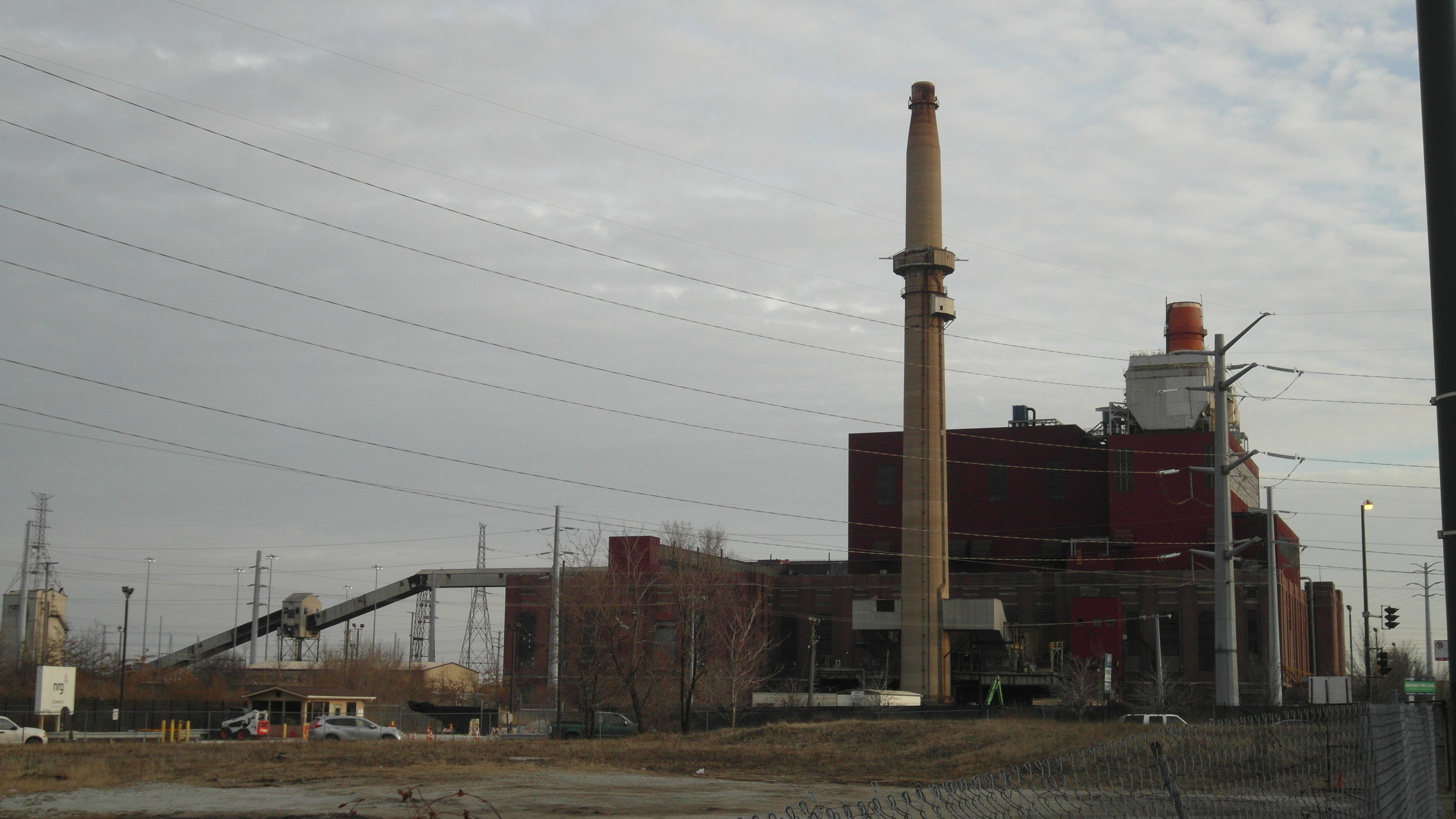
Crawford Station viewed from the north (2019)

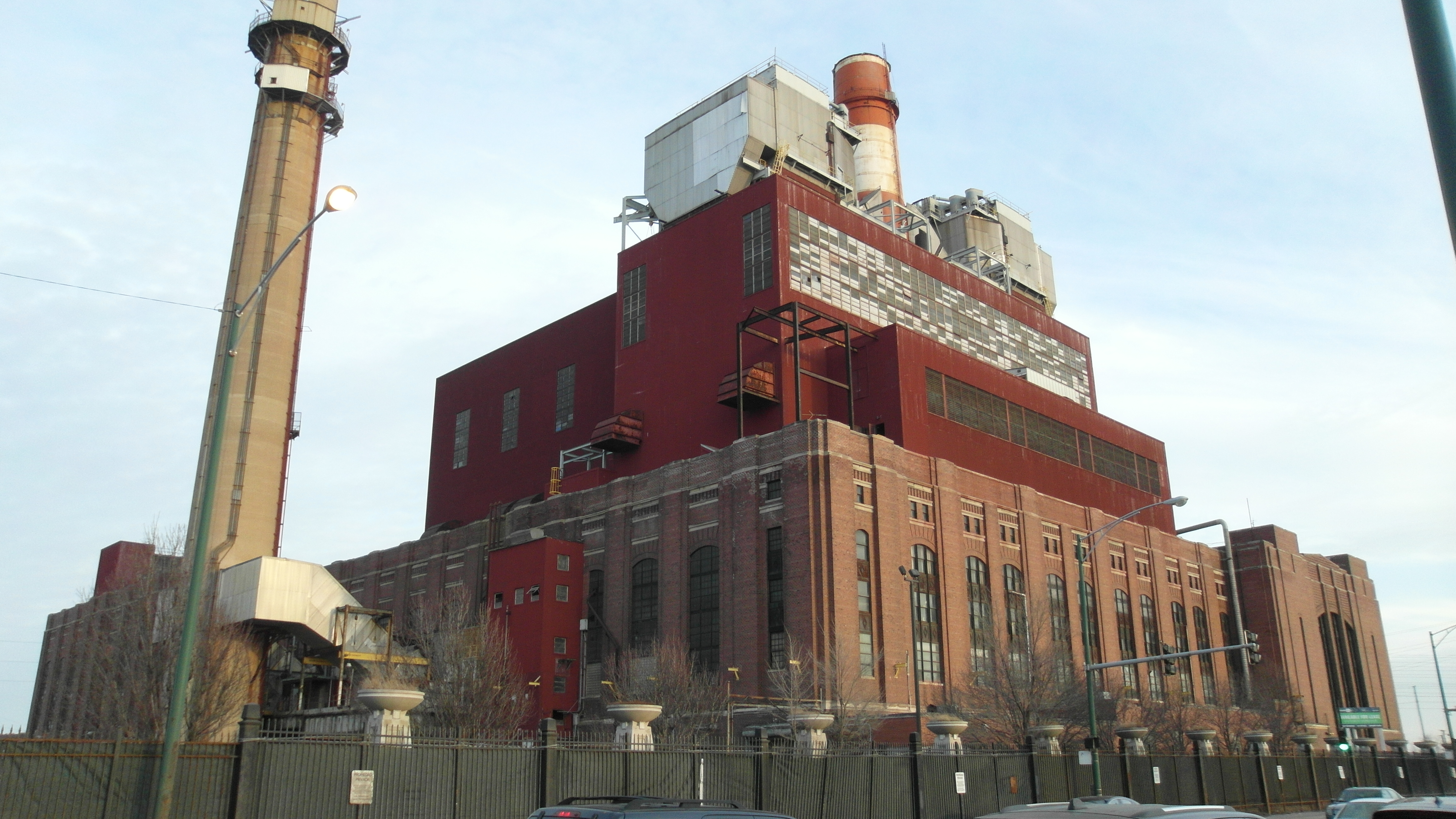
Crawford Station (2019)

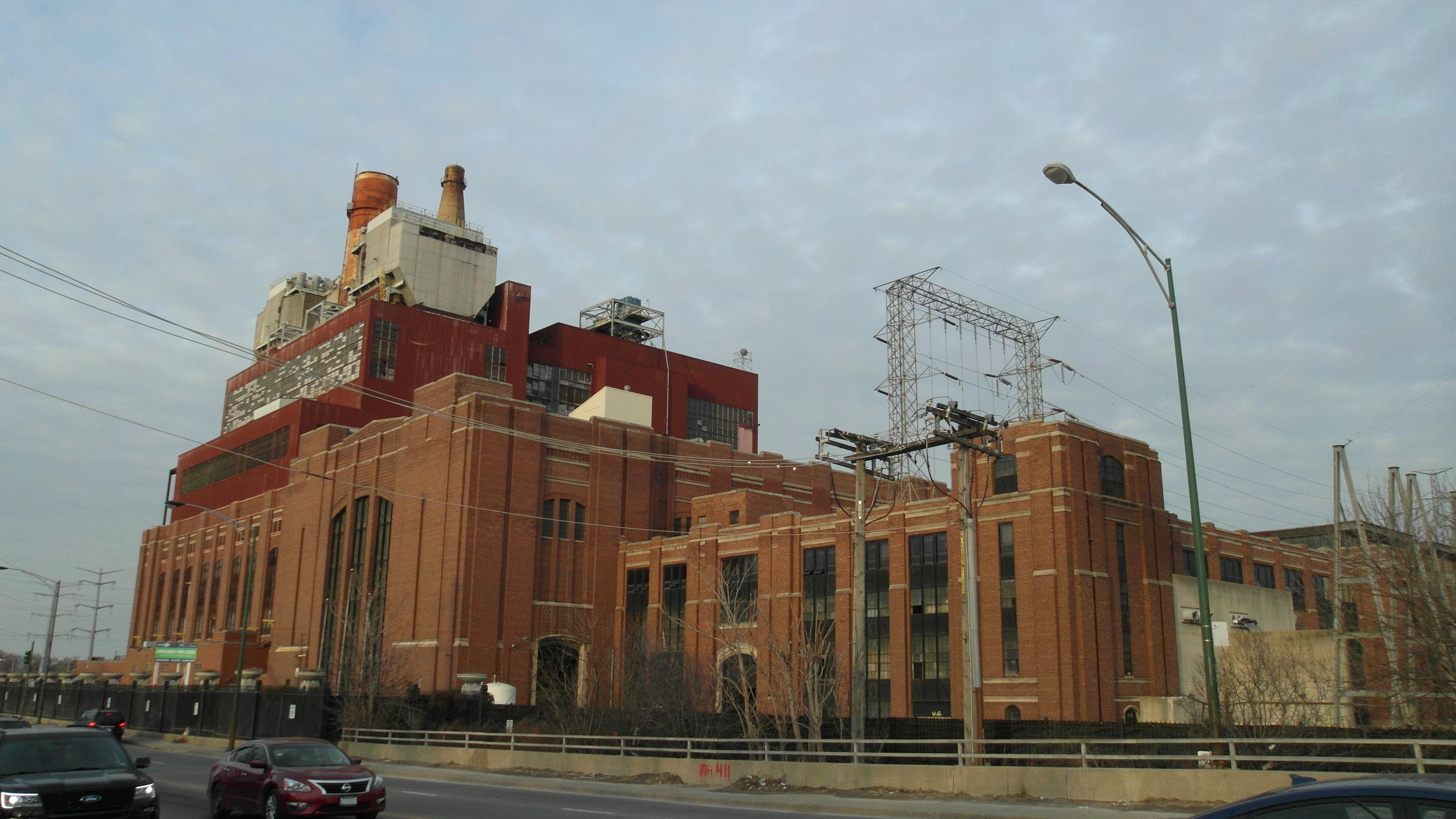
Crawford Station viewed from the southwest (2019)

== See also ==
- Coal-fired power stations in Illinois
- West Side, Chicago
