= Attempted acquisition of Albertsons by Kroger =

2022–24 failed American business merger

- Initiator: Kroger
- Target: Albertsons
- Type: Full acquisition
- Cost: $24.6 billion
- Initiated: October 14, 2022
- Canceled: December 11, 2024

In October 2022, American grocery chain Kroger agreed to purchase rival Albertsons for $24.6 billion. Both companies, comprising two of the largest supermarket chains in the United States, serve most of the country's mid-tier grocery market. Kroger planned to compete with non-union grocery chain Amazon Fresh, which includes Whole Foods Market, discount department store chains Target and Walmart, and the warehouse club retail chains Costco and Sam's Club. This merger would have created one of the largest grocery store chains in the United States, combining nearly 5,000 stores and employing approximately 700,000 people.

In February 2024, the Federal Trade Commission (FTC) filed a lawsuit to block the merger stating the deal would raise prices, lower quality, limit choices for consumers, and harm workers. In December 2024, a U.S. district judge agreed with the FTC that the merger would risk reducing competition at the expense of both consumers and workers. The federal judge halted Kroger's acquisition of Albertsons. The merger was also simultaneously halted by a Washington state judge that ruled the merger violated consumer-protection laws within the state. Both companies terminated the deal following the rulings.

== Background ==
=== Previous mergers and acquisitions ===
Albertsons merged with Safeway in 2015 in a $9.2 billion deal which included an FTC requirement to spin off 168 stores to stop the new company having a monopoly in certain markets. The commitment was the largest ever divestiture of supermarkets at the time. 146 stores were sold to Haggen, a Washington supermarket chain, for around $300 million. The deal was closed in January 2015; Haggen ended up announcing in August that it would close or sell around a fifth of its stores, and in September sued Albertsons for allegedly sabotaging its expansion, before filing for bankruptcy. Albertsons bought 33 former Haggen stores for $14.3 million at a bankruptcy auction in November, many for the nominal price of $1 since they came with liabilities as part of their sale. The failure of the spin-off of stores to Haggen has been seen as a particular concern for the proposed Albertsons–Kroger merger.

=== Lead-up to the 2022–2024 merger ===
In October 2022, Kroger agreed to buy Albertsons for $34.10 per share, valuing the deal at $24.6 billion. The acquisition aims to enhance Kroger's competitive edge by expanding its market presence and leveraging economies of scale to offer better prices and services to customers. However, the merger has faced significant scrutiny from regulators and opposition from various stakeholders.

=== Potential combined list of banners ===
Kroger banners

- Bakers
- City Market
- Dillons
- Gerbes
- Food 4 Less
- Foods Co.
- Fred Meyer
- Fry's
- Harris Teeter
- JayC
- King Soopers
- Kroger
- QFC
- Metro Market
- Pick 'n Save
- Ralphs
- Ruler Foods
- Smith's

Albertsons banners

- Acme
- Albertsons
- Albertsons Market
- Amigos
- Andronico's
- Balducci's
- Jewel-Osco
- Kings
- Market Street
- Pak 'n Save
- Pavilions
- Randalls
- Safeway
- Shaw's
- Star Market
- Tom Thumb
- United
- Vons

To be divested to C&S

- Kroger and Albertsons planned to divest 579 grocery store locations, across 18 states and Washington, D.C., to C&S, including:
  - Albertsons (99 store locations in AZ, CA, CO, ID, LA, MO, NV, NM, OR, TX, UT, WA, and WY)
  - Carrs (11 store locations in AK)
  - Eagle (1 store location in AK)
  - Haggen (12 store locations in WA)
  - Harris Teeter (9 store locations in DE, MD, VA, and DC)
  - Jewel-Osco (4 store locations in IL)
  - Lucky (2 store locations in UT)
  - Mariano's (31 store locations in IL)
  - Market Street (6 store locations in TX)
  - Pavilions (16 store locations in CA)
  - QFC (54 store locations in OR and WA)
  - Randalls (2 store locations in TX)
  - Safeway (283 store locations in AK, AZ, CA, CO, MO, NM, OR, and WA)
  - Tom Thumb (15 store locations in TX)
  - Vons (34 store locations in CA and NV)

== Challenges ==
=== Union challenges ===
In May 2023, the United Food and Commercial Workers International Union (UFCW) announced their opposition to the deal. The International Brotherhood of Teamsters also oppose the deal, saying it "threatens jobs, wages, and benefits for thousands of workers".

Several UFCW locals determined in July 2024, that Kroger's and Albertson's proposed divestiture of hundreds of stores to C&S Wholesale Grocers would reduce consumer access to medications and harm pharmacy competition nationwide. A majority of the 579 stores slated to be acquired by C&S Wholesale Grocers would include pharmacies according to John Marshall, a financial analyst with UFCW Local 3000 and UFCW Local 3245.

=== Regulatory challenges ===
==== Federal ====
On November 29, 2022, the chief executives of the two companies went before the antitrust panel of the Senate Judiciary Committee to defend the merger.

The Federal Trade Commission (FTC) raised concerns about the potential anticompetitive effects of the merger. The FTC filed a lawsuit in February 2024 to block the acquisition, arguing that it would reduce competition, lead to higher grocery prices, and negatively impact workers’ wages and benefits.

On December 10, 2024, U.S. district judge Adrienne Nelson agreed with the FTC, that the merger would risk reducing competition at the expense of both consumers and workers. Judge Nelson halted Kroger's $24.6 billion acquisition of Albertsons with a preliminary injunction. Lawyers for the companies previously have said that if the judge were to rule against the deal, the acquisition would likely be called off.

==== State ====
Attorneys general from Arizona, California, the District of Columbia, Illinois, Maryland, Nevada, New Mexico, Oregon and Wyoming joined the FTC's lawsuit to block the merger.

In January 2024, Bob Ferguson, the Washington attorney general filed a lawsuit to stop the merger. In February 2024, Colorado attorney general Phil Weiser filed a lawsuit in an attempt to stop the merger due to his belief that it would greatly reduce competition and harm Coloradans.

On December 10, 2024, King County Superior Court judge Marshall Ferguson ruled in favor of blocking the deal for the merger. Throughout the three week trial, the state argued that C&S Wholesale did not have sufficient retail experience to effectively operate the stores it would be acquiring and that it would end up selling or simply closing the locations. State regulators also warned that the plan to preserve competition through the divestiture of hundreds of Kroger and Albertsons stores would be fatally flawed. The Superior Court judge said, "The effect of this merger may be to substantially lessen competition in Washington." Kroger and Albertsons committed to make $1 billion in investments to keep prices lower. However, attorneys for the state called the investment promises "unenforceable, impossible to verify, and temporary."

=== Divestiture plans ===
To address regulatory concerns, Kroger and Albertsons proposed divesting 579 stores across various locations to C&S Wholesale Grocers. This divestiture was intended to maintain competitive balance in the grocery market and alleviate fears of a monopoly.

== Termination and aftermath ==
Kroger and Albertsons terminated their merger attempt on December 11, 2024, following its block by the two judges; both companies accused each other of not doing enough to alleviate regulatory concerns. The latter also filed a breach of contract lawsuit against the former, seeking at least $6 billion in damages, which includes a $600 million termination fee.
