= DVDXpress =

American company

DVDXpress was a media company that owned and operated a network of DVD rental kiosks in supermarket locations across North America. The company was the second largest player in the DVD kiosk sector after Redbox, and was founded in 2001 by entrepreneurs Greg Meyer and Jason Tanzer as a way to fill the need for a more efficient and cost-effective method to provide DVD rentals in existing retail establishments. DVDXpress was acquired by Coinstar, Inc. in late 2007, subsequently merged with their Redbox division in 2009, and ultimately spun out as an independent entity.

== Locations ==
DVDXpress had many of its domestic kiosks in Kroger, Bashas, Lowes, Albertsons, Haggen, Acme, The Markets, Safeway Inc., ShopRite and WinCo Foods supermarkets. DVDXpress kiosks offered DVD rentals at a price point between $1.50 and $2.00 per day.

== Technology ==
The DVDXpress kiosks were the first to utilize RFID technology to identify the DVDs that it dispensed and wireless technology to communicate to the Internet. Customers had the ability to browse availability of titles real-time via the company's website and reserve movies to be picked up at the kiosk at a later time.

== See also ==
Competitors include Redbox.
