= Homeland (supermarket) =

American supermarket chain

HAC, Inc.
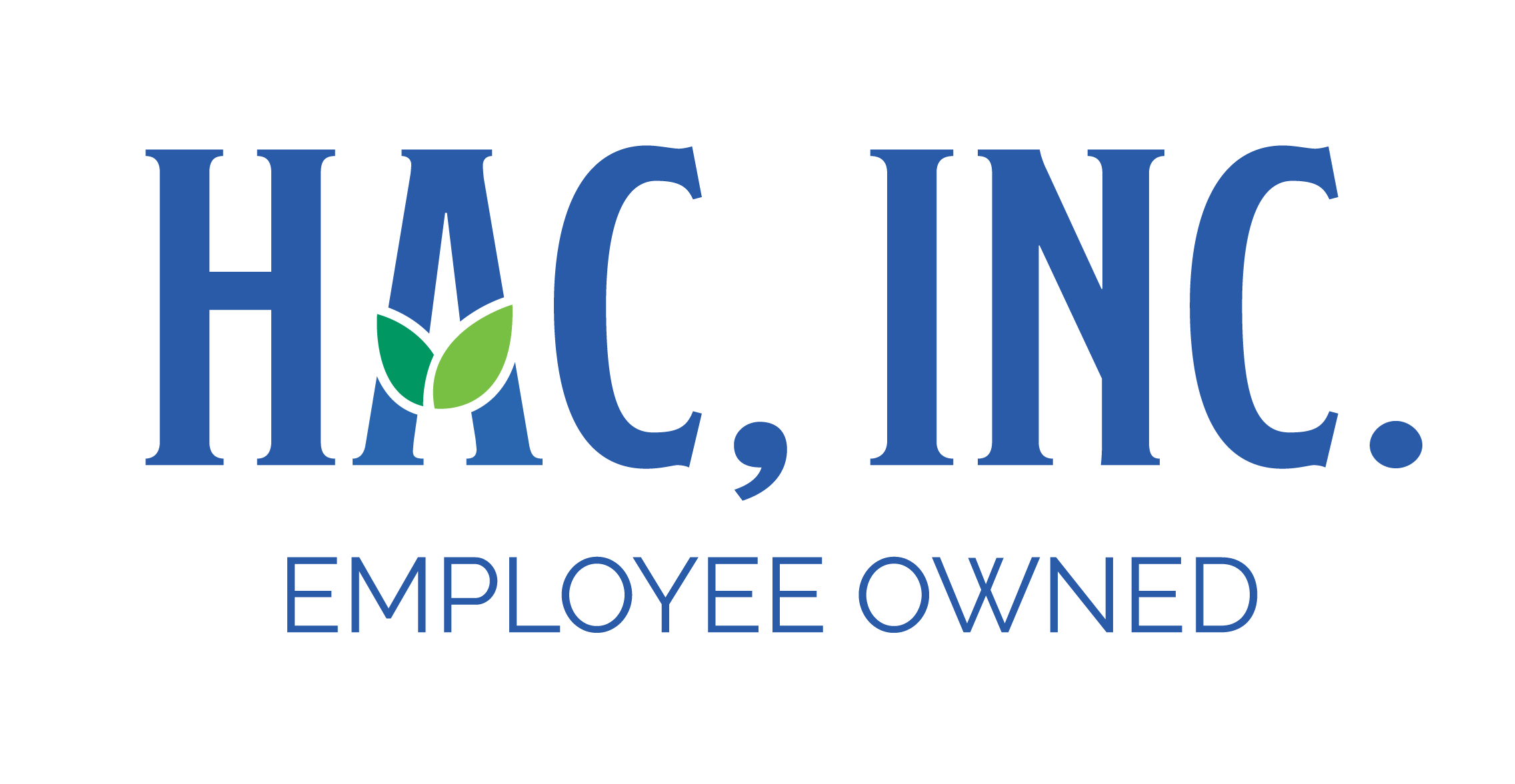
- Logo since 2025

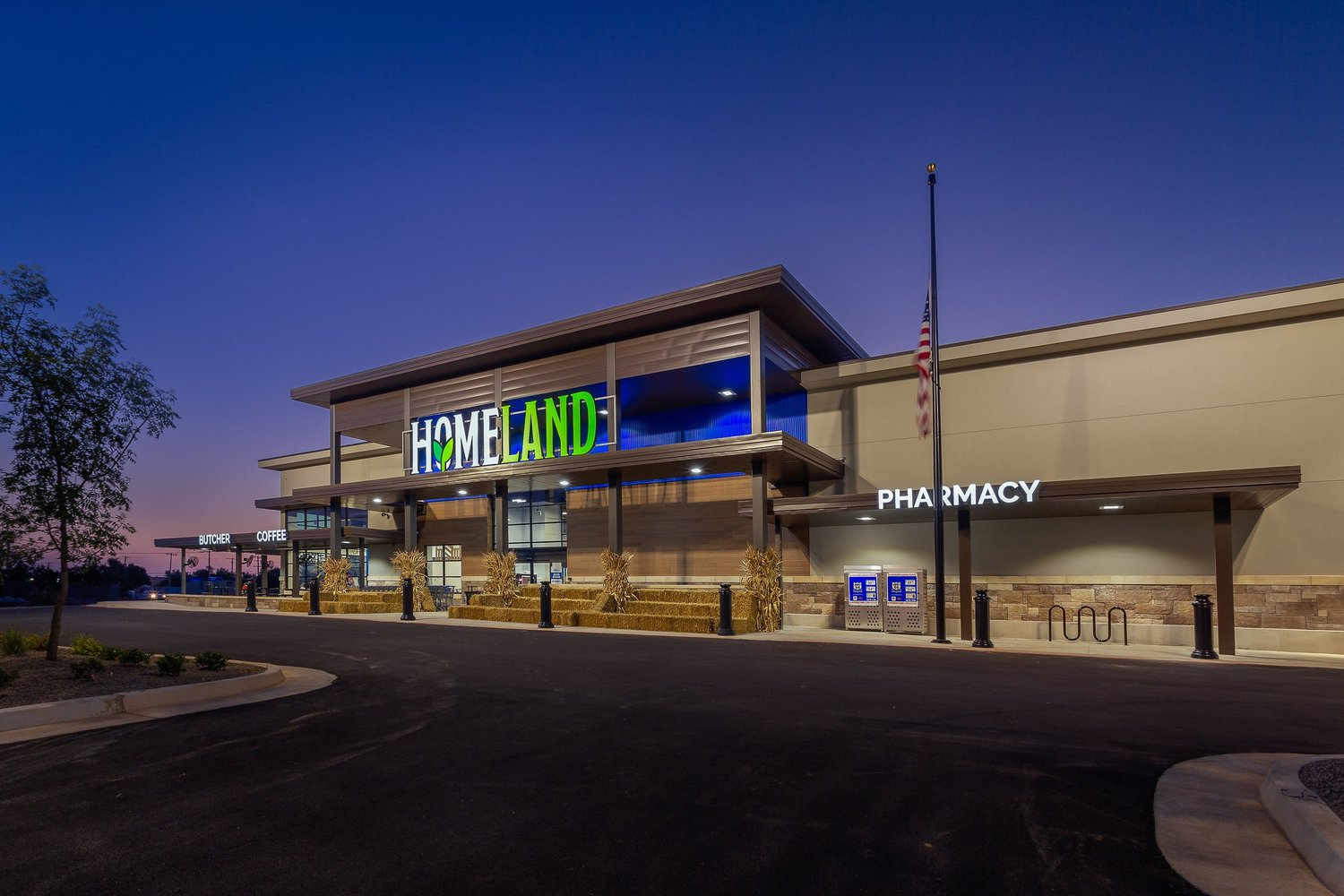
- Homeland storefront in Oklahoma City
- Trade name: Homeland
- Type: Private
- Industry: Retail
- Founded: 1916
- Founder: H.D. Snell
- Headquarters: Oklahoma City, Oklahoma, U.S.
- Number of locations: 70 (2025)
- Area served: United States
- Brands: Homeland, United, Cash Saver, Piggly Wiggly, Food World
- Owner: ESOP (100% Employee Owned)
- Number of employees: 3,000+
- Website: www.homelandstores.com

Homeland is a supermarket chain in the United States. Homeland is the main supermarket banner of Homeland Acquisition Corporation (H.A.C., Inc.), the supermarket banner's parent company, and the names are often used interchangeably. Homeland's headquarters is in Oklahoma City, Oklahoma. As of 2019, it operates 79 supermarkets in Oklahoma, Kansas, Georgia and Texas. Many of H.A.C., Inc.'s supermarkets also include pharmacies and fuel centers. In 2019, Homeland purchased the remaining Oklahoma Food Pyramid stores from Rogersville, Missouri based Pyramid Foods which owns Price Cutter and Ramey.

== History ==
=== Origins ===
The company traces its history to the first United Supermarket opened in Sayre, Oklahoma by H.D. Snell in 1916. United Supermarkets of Oklahoma became part of Homeland in 2008.

=== Homeland Stores Inc. ===
Homeland used to be the Oklahoma division of Safeway, and it was spun off from Safeway in 1987. The "Homeland" name was adopted in 1988. Homeland Stores Inc. operated as an independent chain and, at times, a publicly traded company until 2002.

=== Subsidiary of A.W.G. ===
Homeland filed for Chapter 11 bankruptcy in 2001, its second time in bankruptcy since 1996, when it filed for a pre-arranged bankruptcy in an effort to shed debt. In 2002, it was bought by and became a subsidiary of Associated Wholesale Grocers. The supermarkets still operate under the "Homeland" name.

In 2004, the company acquired three Country Mart supermarkets in Lawton, Oklahoma. In 2005, the company purchased seven stores in Wichita, Kansas from Falley's. In 2006, the company purchased the remaining fifteen stores from Falley's. In June 2007, Homeland purchased seven stores from the Albertsons grocery chain. In January 2008, Homeland purchased the 26-store United Supermarkets of Oklahoma chain. On November 14, 2008, Homeland purchased five Williams Discount Food stores, formerly Albertsons. This purchase became official December 14, 2008. In August 2011, Homeland purchased the three-store Super Save Food chain.

=== Employee-owned company ===
Homeland was sold to its employees in December 2011.

In 2015, the company converted three stores to the Cash Saver format. In this format, the retail price reflects the cost of the product and 10% is added on at the register.

In September 2013, Homeland's parent company, HAC, Inc. expanded into Georgia by buying 11 of the Belle Foods chain stores; most of those stores bearing the Piggly Wiggly name. The company acquired three additional Georgia locations the following year.

In 2015 the company acquired a location in El Reno, Oklahoma, which was previously operated by Prague Grocery. This location was eventually rebannered as a United Supermarket. The company also converted an additional six locations to the Cash Saver format.

In 2017, the company became a founding member of the Certified EO organization which aims to promote employee ownership. In December 2018, H.A.C., Inc. was honored by The Shelby Report as the South Eastern Retailer of the Year.

In 2019, the company acquired five stores from RPCS INC: three in Ponca City, one in Bartlesville, and one in Stillwater.

In 2025, the company announced the closing of four stores in Oklahoma and one in Georgia.

== Retail Banners ==
As of 2025, H.A.C., Inc. operated the following banners:

- Homeland (35 locations)
- United (15 locations)
- Cash Saver (13 locations)

== Locations ==
As of 2025:

- Altus, OK (United)
- Ardmore, OK (Homeland)
- Bartlesville, OK (Three Homeland stores and United)
- Bethany, OK (Cash Saver)
- Blackwell, OK (United)
- Cherokee, OK (United)
- Chickasha, OK (Homeland)
- Cleveland, OK (Cash Saver)
- Clinton, OK (Homeland and United)
- Cordell, OK (United)
- Del City, OK (Cash Saver)
- Duncan, OK (Homeland)
- Edmond, OK (Two Homeland stores)
- El Reno, OK (United)
- Elk City, OK (Homeland and United)
- Enid, OK (Cash Saver)
- Frederick, OK (United)
- Guthrie, OK (Cash Saver)
- Haskell, OK (Homeland)
- Henryetta, OK (Homeland)
- Hobart, OK (United)
- Hollis, OK (United)
- Lawton, OK (Cash Saver and Two Homeland stores)
- Madill, OK (Cash Saver)
- Mangum, OK (United)
- Marietta, OK (Homeland)
- Muskogee, OK (Two Homeland stores and Cash Saver)
- Mustang, OK (Homeland)
- Norman, OK (Three Homeland stores)
- Nowata, OK (Homeland)
- Okemah, OK (Homeland)
- Oklahoma City, OK (Four Homeland stores and Cash Saver)
- Perry, OK (Homeland)
- Ponca City, OK (Two Homeland stores)
- Pryor, OK (Homeland)
- Purcell, OK (Cash Saver)
- Sand Springs, OK (Two Cash Saver stores)
- Seminole, OK (Cash Saver)
- Shawnee, OK (Homeland)
- Stillwater, OK (Homeland)
- Weatherford, OK (United)
- Woodward, OK (Two United stores)
- Yukon, OK (Homeland)
- Justin, TX (Homeland)
