= My Pet Warehouse =

Pet supply retailer

- Type: Private
- Industry: Retail
- Founded: South Melbourne, Victoria, Australia 2009
- Headquarters: Melbourne, Australia
- Number of locations: 13
- Key people: Philip Bartholomew, CEO
- Products: Pet food, accessories, prescription diets, flea and worming
- Services: Pet supplies, grooming, dog training.
- Website: www.mypetwarehouse.com.au

My Pet Warehouse is an Australian retailer of pet supplies. It was founded in 2009 by Philip Bartholomew and it operates from thirteen locations. The company offers a variety of specialty pet supplies and accessories. As of 2015, it is the largest online retailer of pet supplies in Australia with $33 million annual revenue.

== History ==
As a former CEO of Petbarn, Philip Bartholomew launched the multichannel pet store in early 2009. Bartholomew founded The Pet Warehouse, which merged with Petbarn in 2003 and was later acquired by Mammoth Pet Holdings. He left the company and signed a three-year non-compete clause. As soon as the clause expired, Bartholomew started a new pet supplies company under the name My Pet Warehouse in June 2009. The company began its operations from Melbourne, Australia and soon established ten pet stores in the major Australian cities including Perth, Sydney and Brisbane.

My Pet Warehouse was sold to PetStock.

== Growth ==
In 2015, the company sold five of its Melbourne stores to consolidate the funds to open eight new stores strategically located in Sydney, Melbourne and Brisbane to expand its reach.

== See also ==
- Pet Food Express
