= Balducci's =

American specialty gourmet food retailer

- Company type: Subsidiary
- Industry: Retail
- Founded: 1916 Brooklyn, New York, U.S. 1946 Manhattan, New York, U.S.
- Founder: Louis Balducci, Maria Balducci
- Headquarters: Germantown, Maryland
- Area served: Connecticut; New York; Maryland; Virginia
- Products: Specialty Gourmet
- Owner: Albertsons
- Website: www.balduccis.com

Balducci's Food Lover's Market is a specialty gourmet food retailer in the Mid-Atlantic United States with seven grocery stores, owned by Albertsons since 2020.

== History ==
The Balducci family patriarch, Louis, an immigrant from Corato, Italy, began his family's career in the New York City food trade by selling fruits and vegetables from a pushcart in Greenpoint, Brooklyn between 1914 and 1925. The family returned to Italy in 1925, returned to the United States in 1939 and in 1946 Louis and his wife Maria opened a fruit stand at the corner of Christopher Street and Greenwich Avenue in Greenwich Village. In 1972, they moved across Sixth Avenue into a storefront at Sixth and West 9th St.

From that site on Sixth Avenue, Balducci's is considered to have been the first grocer in New York City to sell premium quality foods with a butcher, fishmonger, delicatessen and greengrocer all in the same store. It became a model for specialty markets all over the city.

When the store moved to Sixth Avenue it was owned by two of Louis and Maria's children, Andy (and his wife Nina) and Grace (and her husband, Joe Doria). (A third child, Charles, was a physician; his son, Louis B., was active in managing the store.) News accounts describe disputes between the three siblings and their father Louis. In 1985 Grace and Joe left the company to start Grace's Marketplace on the Upper East Side. Louis B. left in the late 1980s and became partner at Agata & Valentina, another specialty grocer on Upper East Side.

With their daughters uninterested in taking over the store, Andy and Nina sold in 1999 for $26.5 million to Sutton Place Gourmet, a Maryland-based company. Sales for the combined company were more than $130 million per year.

The flagship store on Sixth Avenue in Greenwich Village closed in January 2003 but a branch store, on West 66th Street, remained open.

In November 2003, the company was purchased by an investment group led by Bear Stearns Merchant Banking.

(Separate from the history of the store, but part of the family's history in food, Andy and Nina's daughter Ria's husband Kevin Murphy left Balducci's and started Baldor Specialty Foods, an East-Coast produce distributor. The name Baldor is said to be a combination of the names Balducci and Doria.)

=== Balducci's after 2005 ===
Previous Balducci's logo

The new flagship store in the New York Savings Bank Building (at Eighth Avenue and 14th Street) in Manhattan opened in December 2005. Following its opening, Local 1500 of the United Food and Commercial Workers Union began protesting outside the store against the non-unionized status of employees. In April 2009 the company closed its two New York City locations, the new flagship at Eighth Avenue and 14th Street and the West 66th Street store.

There are currently eight full-service retail stores in Connecticut, Maryland, Virginia, and New York (Scarsdale). In 2012, Balducci's returned to New York with Balducci's Gourmet on the Go Café in Hearst Tower, which serves prepared meals and soups as well as a gourmet salad and coffee bar. There are four Balducci's Express locations: three in JFK Airport in New York and one at the Leesburg Corner Premium Outlets in Virginia. There also was a Balducci's Gourmet on the Go Café located in the Bloomberg Children's Center at the Johns Hopkins Hospital, but it closed in 2024.

In April 2009 Balducci's was sold to Kings Food Markets, a portfolio company of Angelo, Gordon and Co. In 2016, Kings and Balducci's were sold to GSSG Capital. In 2020, Balducci's filed for bankruptcy, and was sold to Albertsons.
