= Kings Food Markets =

American food market chain owned by Albertsons Companies, Inc

- Type: Private
- Industry: Retail
- Founded: 1936; 90 years ago, in Summit, New Jersey
- Headquarters: Parsippany, New Jersey, United States
- Number of locations: 18 stores (2025)
- Area served: Connecticut, New Jersey, New York
- Products: Grocery
- Revenue: $400 million USD (2016)
- Owner: Marks & Spencer (1988–2006); Angelo, Gordon & Co. (2006–2016); KB Holding (GSSG Capital) (2016–2020); Albertsons (2021–present)
- Website: kingsfoodmarkets.com

Kings Food Markets is an American food market chain headquartered in Parsippany, New Jersey, with stores in northern New Jersey, New York, and Connecticut.

From 1988 to 2006, it was owned by British retailer Marks & Spencer.

In 2009, Kings acquired Balducci's. In 2016, Kings and Balducci's were sold by Angelo, Gordon & Co. and MTN Capital Partners to GSSG Capital.

The upscale market branded private label products under the Kings Own brand name.

During the COVID-19 pandemic in 2020, the market drew national attention for its policy on mask-wearing: when a customer entered the store without wearing a mask, they were given a mask and the CEO's phone number.

On August 23, 2020, Kings filed for bankruptcy and on October 14, 2020, it was announced that Albertsons submitted a winning $96M bid for the company.

On December 7, 2020, Kings closed their location in Maplewood, New Jersey, after being in Maplewood since 1942. On the same day the Maplewood location closed, Kings announced their locations in Long Hill, New Jersey, and on River Street in Hoboken New Jersey, will close. These locations closed in late December 2020.

On January 15, 2021, Kings announced that their locations in Bernardsville, New Jersey, and in Warren Township, New Jersey, will close. These locations closed on January 23, 2021.
