= Shaw's and Star Market =

American supermarket chains in New England region owned by Albertsons Companies, Inc

- Shaw's: Perfecting the art of fresh Star Market: See what makes us shine!

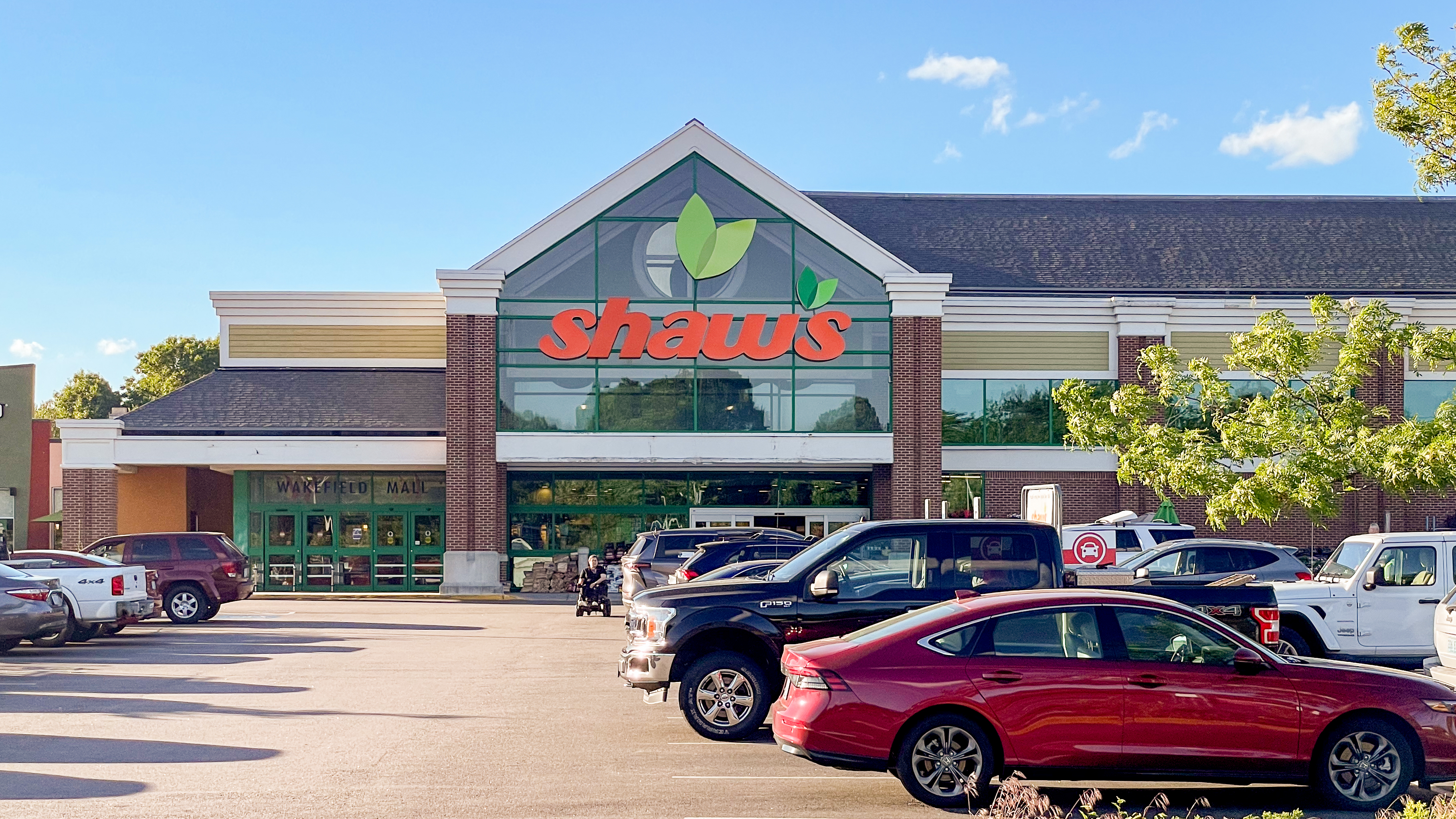
- Exterior of a Shaw's in South Kingstown, Rhode Island
- Type: Subsidiary
- Industry: Retail (Grocery)
- Founded: May 1860 (166 years ago) in Portland, Maine
- Founder: George C. Shaw
- Headquarters: West Bridgewater, Massachusetts
- Number of locations: 133 (Shaw's), 21 (Star Market) (2017)
- Products: Bakery, dairy, deli, floral, frozen foods, grocery, liquor, meat, pharmacy, produce, seafood, snacks, sushi
- Parent: J Sainsbury (1987–2004); Albertsons (2004–present)
- Website: shaws.com starmarket.com

Shaw's and Star Market are two American supermarket chains under united management based in West Bridgewater, Massachusetts, employing about 30,000 associates in 150 total stores; 129 stores are operated under the Shaw's banner in Maine, Massachusetts, New Hampshire, Rhode Island, and Vermont, while Star Market operates 21 stores in Massachusetts, most of which are in or near Boston. Until 2010, Shaw's operated stores in all six New England states, and as of 2021 Shaw's remained the only supermarket chain with stores in five of the six, after it sold its Connecticut operations. The chain's largest competitors are Hannaford, Market Basket, Price Chopper, Roche Bros., Wegmans, and Stop & Shop. Star Market is a companion store to Shaw's, which purchased the competing chain in 1999.

Shaw's and Star Market are wholly owned subsidiaries of the Boise, Idaho–based Albertsons. The combined chain has the largest base of stores that operate in New England, but is the third-largest New England–based grocer behind Quincy, Massachusetts–based Stop & Shop and Scarborough, Maine–based Hannaford; Hannaford operates stores in upstate New York, while Stop & Shop's operations extend through downstate New York and into New Jersey; only Shaw's does business solely in New England.

As of July 5, 2013, Shaw's and Star Market no longer use loyalty cards at their stores, as a way to compete with other local stores that do not have them. However, like most of Albertsons' chains, Shaw's and Star Market participate in the just for U rewards program, which does not use a physical card.

== History ==
=== Beginning ===
In 1860, George C. Shaw opened a small teashop in Portland, Maine. Meanwhile, Maynard A. Davis established a group of small downtown grocery stores in Brockton and New Bedford, Massachusetts, called the Brockton Public Market (BPM) food retailers. In 1919, Davis purchased the George C. Shaw Company and made it a subsidiary of BPM.

=== Expansion ===
As George C. Shaw and BPM continued to grow, it was decided that a central warehouse would be needed for the two companies. In 1961, a warehouse in Brockton was purchased.

By 1965, George C. Shaw had begun to expand northward, into New Hampshire. This expansion, combined with BPM's growth in southern Massachusetts, moved the companies to build a distribution center in 1972 in East Bridgewater, Massachusetts. In the 1980s, a warehouse was built in Wells, Maine, and in January 1991, Shaw's opened a distribution facility for perishable food items in Methuen, Massachusetts.

In 1978, BPM stores in Massachusetts became Shaw's Supermarkets, Inc. to maximize advertising. It was the first step towards merging the two companies.

In November 1983, J Sainsbury plc, then the UK's largest supermarket group, purchased 21% of Shaw's outstanding stock. In June 1987, Sainsbury's acquired controlling interest.

=== Acquisitions ===
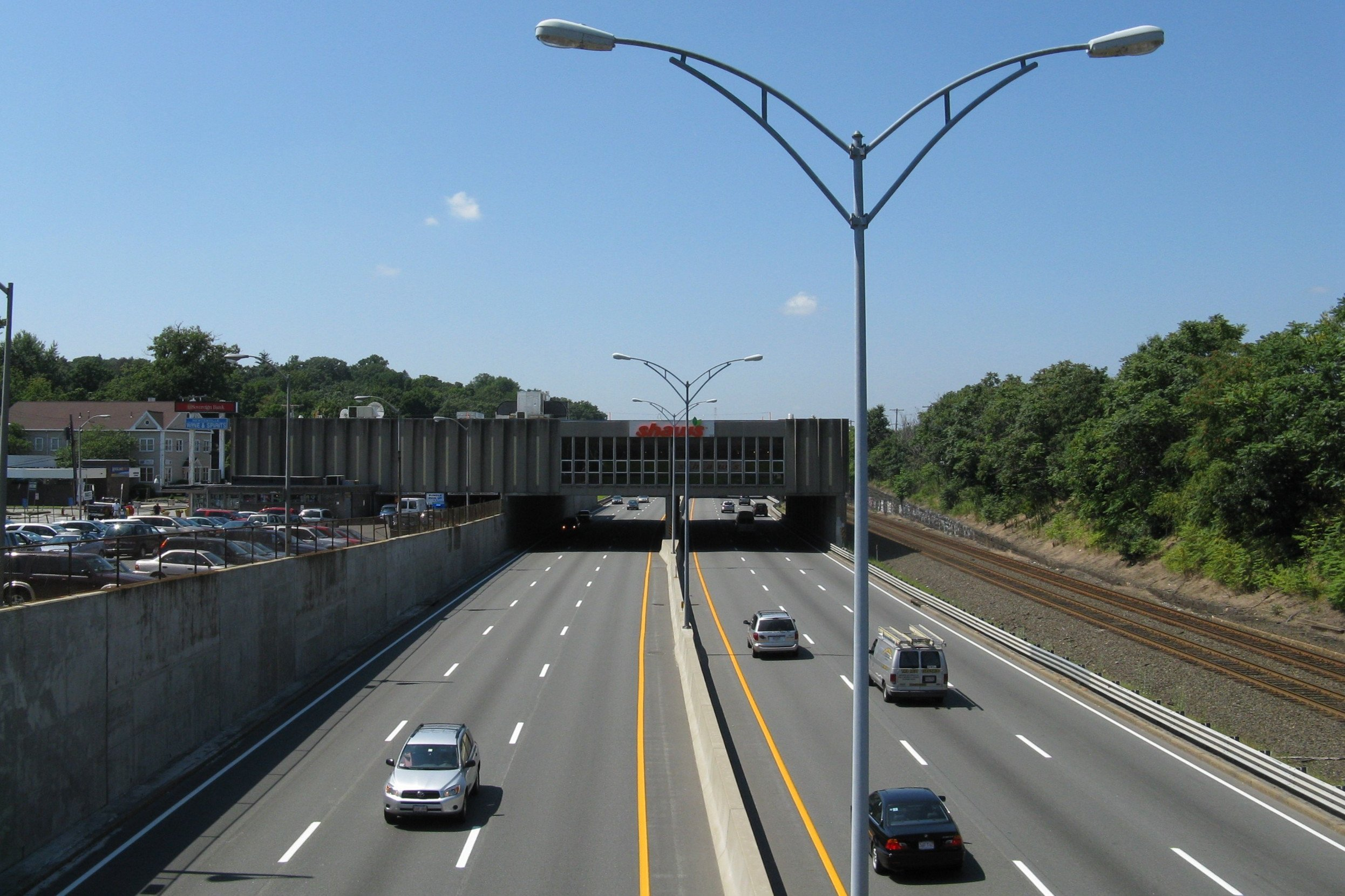
A Shaw's (now Star Market) over the Massachusetts Turnpike in Newton

J Sainsbury plc acquired stores from four New England food retailers: Iandoli's (1987), Cerretani's (1993), Star Market (1999) and Butson's (2003).

In 1995, Shaw's entered Connecticut, opening five stores. The next year, Sainsbury purchased 12 former Edwards supermarkets and two future sites from Royal Ahold.

In 1999, Shaw's made its largest acquisition by acquiring the Star Market chain. Star Market had been owned by Investcorp, which in turn purchased the chain from American Stores in 1994. American Stores had acquired Star Market through its hostile takeover of Jewel Companies, Inc. in 1984 and Jewel had acquired Star Market in 1964. The acquisition strengthened Shaw's position as the second-largest supermarket company in New England. Like Shaw's, the Star Market Company had humble beginnings, and many "firsts" in the supermarket industry. Star was the first New England supermarket to have air-conditioned stores, the touch method of ringing registers, in-store check verification, refrigerated cooked foods, self-service wrapped meats, and packaged produce.

=== Distribution center closings ===
In November 1999, J Sainsbury/Shaw's Supermarkets closed the Star Market Distribution Center in Norwood, laying off over 300 Local 25 Teamster members. In May 1999 Local 25 agreed to a six-month extension with J Sainsbury/Shaw's Supermarkets on the then-prevailing contract to bargain in "good faith". In 2001, J Sainsbury/Shaw's Supermarkets closed the Shaw's Distribution Center in East Bridgewater, laying off over 400 UFCW members. J Sainsbury/Shaw's Supermarkets indicated that the warehouse was "not centrally located in its service area, and the necessary physical expansion is impossible". C&S Wholesale Grocers does the majority of the work that was performed by the two union-based distribution centers. C&S's distribution center/headquarters were in Brattleboro, Vermont, at the time.

=== Albertsons and SuperValu ===
In 2004, J Sainsbury sold Shaw's to Albertsons for US$2.48 billion. On June 2, 2006, a partnership of SuperValu, CVS Corporation, and several investment firms, including Cerberus Capital, acquired Albertsons with the intent to divvy up the parts. SuperValu received what was generally thought of as the best-performing assets, including Shaw's and Star Market, along with regional chains including Acme Markets (Philadelphia); Jewel, and Jewel-Osco (Chicago). However, Shaw's was beset by store closings almost yearly between 2006 and 2011 during its acquisition by SuperValu. At its 2006 peak, Shaw's operated more than 200 stores in New England, however, Shaw's footprint has been reduced except in Vermont, and has pulled out of Connecticut altogether.

The first round of closings was announced in late August 2006, when Shaw's announced it would be closing six in October. These stores were in New Britain, Southington, and Bridgeport, Connecticut; and in Worcester and New Bedford, Massachusetts. In September 2007, Shaw's closed its stores in Providence and Pawtucket, Rhode Island; and Waterbury, Connecticut, because of poor sales. The closings left Shaw's with 204 stores. A total of 224 workers were laid off or transferred.

On July 25, 2009, Shaw's closed its Bristol and Shelton, Connecticut, stores. In early 2009, Shaw's had closed stores in Gorham, New Hampshire, and Bangor, Maine. The largest round of closings was in 2010; Shaw's announced in February that it would sell or close its 18 remaining Connecticut stores. Eleven of those were sold to New Jersey–based Wakefern, operator of ShopRite and PriceRite supermarkets; and 5 to Stop & Shop. One of the remaining two ultimately also became a Stop & Shop, while the other was subdivided for a Supervalu-owned Save-A-Lot. In addition to the store closures, in late March 2010, Shaw's eliminated about 4% of its full-time workforce, which amounted to nearly 650 jobs spread out over the about 120 non-union stores.

A recent round of closings was in early 2011; on January 5, Shaw's announced that three Massachusetts and two Rhode Island stores that were unprofitable would close by February 17. After the closures, Shaw's was left with 169 stores.

In November 2012, Shaw's and its then-parent company, SuperValu, announced that Shaw's would lay off 700 employees in an effort to re-group and end financial losses. It also disclosed it had been looking for a buyer.

In January 2013, Cerberus Capital Management announced a deal to acquire 877 stores in the Albertsons, Acme, Jewel-Osco, and Shaw's and Star Market chains from SuperValu for $100 million and acquisition of $3.2 billion on SuperValu debt. The deal closed on March 21, 2013.

=== Store count ===
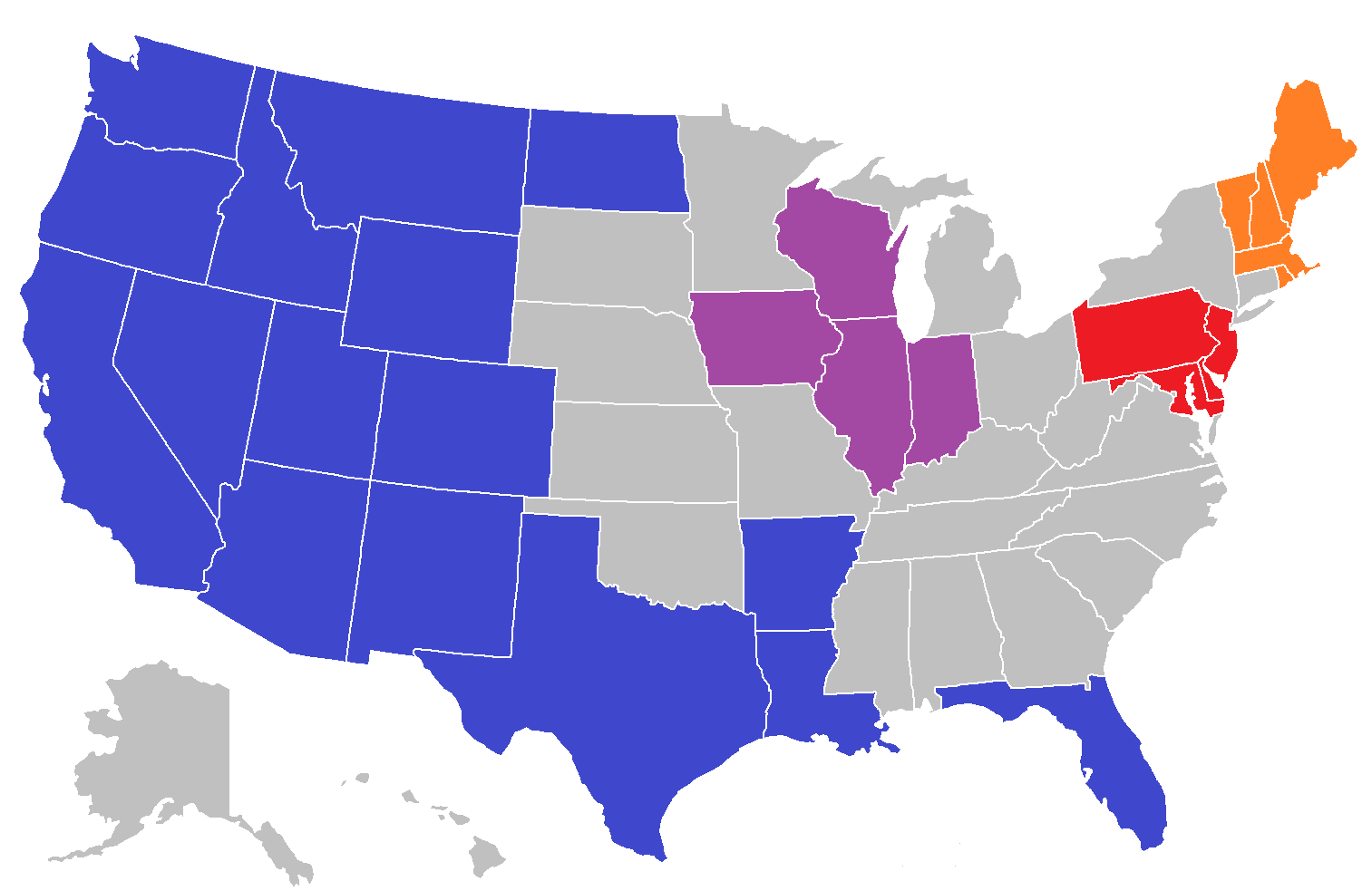
Shaw's and Star Market locations in orange. Its sister chains are in blue (Albertsons), red (Acme), and purple (Jewel-Osco).

According to their website, as of January 2018, Shaw's and Star Market operated a total of 154 locations: 79 in Massachusetts (21 as Star Market), 8 in Rhode Island, 19 in Vermont, 27 in New Hampshire, and 21 in Maine. This is compared to January 2010, and shortly before the Connecticut stores were sold, Shaws operated 194 stores: 12 in Rhode Island, 18 in Connecticut, 19 in Vermont, 22 in Maine, 34 in New Hampshire, and 89 in Massachusetts (including 12 operating as Star Market at the time).

Shaw's store footprint extends (south to north) from the village of Wakefield in South Kingstown, Rhode Island, to the Canada–US border in Derby, Vermont. Shaw's strongest presences are in Greater Boston (where its largest competitor is Stop & Shop) and throughout New Hampshire and Vermont (where its largest competitor is Hannaford).

Amidst the closings, SuperValu remodeled and updated many Shaw's stores, which has continued under Albertsons ownership. In late 2010, SuperValu introduced a newly redesigned website for Shaw's; the website design is shared with sister store Jewel-Osco. Shaw's also, during that time, increased their marketing efforts, partnering with the New England Patriots and the Boston Red Sox Radio Network as their "official supermarket", airing advertisements frequently on New England radio stations, and maintaining a Facebook page with more than 93,000 fans.

In December 2013, plans were announced for a new Star Market store in the city of Boston at the site of the Boston Garden redevelopment. The store opened on September 20, 2019. In July 2017, Shaw's announced the opening of a new store in Hudson, Massachusetts, replacing a former Hannaford. The Hudson store is the first new Shaw's store to open in nearly a decade, and marks its first expansion under Albertsons ownership.

Also under Albertsons recent ownership, several Shaw's stores in the immediate Boston area were remodeled and re-opened as Star Markets, with the idea of increasing the number of locations of that brand to a possible 30 over the next few years. As of March 2014, four stores had made the switch, which brought the total number of Star Market stores to 18. As of January 2018, there were 21 Star Market stores.

== Osco Drug ==
Before it was acquired by Shaw's, Star Market Company had been part of Jewel Companies, and while Jewel owned Star it built many combination food-drug stores branded as "Star-Osco", with common checkstands but separate management teams. While it owned Star, Jewel also built many stand-alone Osco Drug stores in New England. After Jewel was acquired by American Stores in 1984, the Star-Osco stores were re-launched as Star Markets, and placed under a single management team. In 1999, Albertsons acquired American Stores, and in 2001, Albertsons sold its 80 New England Osco Drug locations to Jean Coutu group, which added them to its Brooks Pharmacy group. When American Stores sold Star Markets in 1994 to Investcorp, the Osco connection was severed.

When Albertsons bought Sainsbury's American supermarket assets in 2004, including Star Markets, Star and Osco were reunited under one corporate umbrella. By 2005, the signs on the front of all of Albertsons-owned grocery stores with in-store pharmacies were changed, adding either "Osco" or "Sav-On" to the stores' logos, to emphasize the one-stop shopping available inside. The drug store name chosen reflected which of Albertsons' drug chains operated in the specific marketing area. Because New England had previously been an Osco market area, the Shaws and Star Market stores with pharmacies were renamed "Shaws-Osco" and "Star-Osco". As of January 2018, Osco Pharmacy has 55 locations within Shaws and Star Market stores. Albertsons has since retired the Osco branding for Shaw's and Star Market pharmacies and they are branded under the store banner name instead (Shaw's Pharmacy and Star Market Pharmacy respectively.)

== Brands ==
Shaw's and Star Market has gradually acquired brands, including:

- Osco Drug
- Equaline
- Chill
- Wild Harvest
- "O" Organic
- Open Nature
- Shoppers Value
- Home Life
- Market Fresh
- Signature Select (acquired with Safeway; formerly known as Safeway Select under Safeway ownership. Replaced Culinary Circle.)
- Signature Home (acquired with Safeway; formerly known as Safeway Home under Safeway ownership.)
- The Snack Artist

SuperValu announced in May 2011, that its national brand equivalent products (including Shaw's) would be renamed "Essential Everyday" in line with its plans to phase out own-brand products carrying the names of its banners nationwide. Some of these private label products are now produced by Richelieu Foods.
