= Haggen (supermarket) =

American grocery store chain

Haggen, Inc.
- Type: Division
- Industry: Retail (grocery)
- Founded: 1933 (93 years ago) in Bellingham, Washington, U.S.
- Fate: Acquired by Albertsons
- Headquarters: Bellingham, Washington, U.S.
- Number of locations: 15
- Products: Bakery, dairy, deli, flowers, frozen foods, grocery, liquor, lottery, pharmacy, photographic processing, produce, seafood, snacks and Western Union
- Parent: Albertsons (2016–present)
- Website: www.haggen.com

Haggen Food & Pharmacy is an American regional chain of grocery stores located in the state of Washington. It was founded in 1933 by Ben Haggen, Dorothy Haggen, and Doug Clark in Bellingham, Washington, where they opened first store on Bay Street. For the majority of its history under the ownership of Haggen, Inc., Haggen was the largest independent grocery retailer in the Pacific Northwest, with locations in Washington and Oregon. From 1982 through 2014, the company also operated the Top Food & Drug chain.

In late 2014, Haggen agreed to purchase and rebrand 146 West Coast Vons, Pavilions, Albertsons, and Safeway Inc. locations. This expanded Haggen's territory in Oregon, and to southern California, Nevada and Arizona, increasing the chain's locations from 18 stores with 16 pharmacies to 164 stores with 106 pharmacies, and the number of its employees from about 2,000 to about 10,000. On September 1, 2015, Haggen filed suit against Albertsons for false representations and anti-competitive practices, and on September 8, 2015, Haggen Food & Pharmacy filed for bankruptcy. Subsequent to the bankruptcy filing, Haggen announced that they would abandon the new stores and revert to operating as a strictly Washington state grocery chain.

On March 11, 2016, Albertsons reached an agreement to acquire the 29 remaining "core" Haggen stores for $106 million. After this agreement, only 15 stores, all of them in Washington, retained the Haggen branding, though owned by Albertsons. The former holding company was subsequently dissolved in 2019.

== History ==
=== Early years ===
Haggen logo

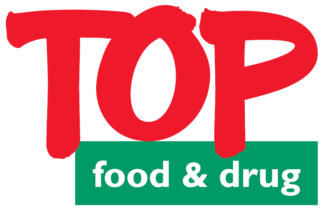
Top Food logo

Haggen, Inc. began in 1933 in the midst of the Great Depression by Benett and Dorothy Haggen, along with Dorothy's brother, Doug Clark, in downtown Bellingham, Washington. The store was first called the Economy Food Store. Business was good, and they moved to a larger location downtown at the corner of Railroad and Magnolia Streets and renamed it The White House Grocery. An in-store bakery was opened in 1941 and proved to be popular. By 1947, the store expanded again. The Haggens closed the White House and built the Town and Country Shopping center on Meridian Street between West Illinois and Maryland streets with Haggen's Thriftway, the store's third name, as the anchor tenant. This store still operates today.

Several years later, they changed the company's name to Haggen Inc. The store continued to prosper and by the 1960s, Haggen expanded beyond Bellingham. With the company incorporated on January 30, 1962, a store was opened in Everett, Washington, in 1962 and a 20,000-square-foot (1,900 m^{2}) store in Lynnwood, Washington, in 1968. Two more stores were opened in Lynnwood in 1971 from the acquired Grocery Boy chain. Expansion for the company was slow. Unlike other grocery stores who expanded through acquisition, Haggen mostly built stores from the ground up. In 1979, the flagship store in Bellingham was expanded to over 40,000 square feet (3,700 m^{2}), creating the chain's first superstore format with full-service departments which it still uses today.

In 1982, the Top Foods division was created by converting existing stores in Snohomish, Washington, and Wenatchee to the superstore format. This proved to be a huge success and the Top Brand was expanded greatly throughout the Puget Sound Region but avoided Seattle because QFC, upscale Larry's Markets, Albertsons, and Safeway saturated the metropolitan area.

=== Recent events ===
In 1989, Haggen became the first grocery store in US with an in-store Starbucks coffee store. In 1995, they expanded to Portland, Oregon, opening stores under the Haggen moniker. In 2008 a joint investigation between the DEA, IRS, FDA and Edmonds police department uncovered a drug diversion scheme at the Edmonds pharmacy location. Ultimately, Haggen paid $425,000 in fines.

After two decades of aggressive expansion and innovation the company began to transition after the death of Dorothy Haggen in October 2008 and the appointment of CEO Jim Donald, former CEO of Starbucks Coffee Company, in September 2009. In January 2010, Haggen stores announced they would cease their longstanding practice of remaining open 24 hours with limited exceptions. The low amount of traffic was said to be the decision to change the store's hours so that the company overall could be more efficient. Haggen closed its Redmond location in July 2010 after operating for less than two years. The company previously but similarly operated a built-from-scratch location in Tigard for two years (2003–2005).

Haggen, Inc. announced on February 17, 2011, that brothers and co-chairmen Don and Rick Haggen had sold a controlling shareholder interest to The Comvest Group. The announcement indicated Don, Rick and other unnamed Haggen family members would maintain a minority stake in the 78-year-old grocery empire. "Any supermarket chain our size is always in play," Rick Haggen said during a media conference call on Thursday. "With this investment by Comvest, we're able to remain as an independent supermarket chain with ... probably no change for our customers and very little change for all the people who work in the company." As a part of the new ownership it was announced that president and CEO Jim Donald would immediately step down, with The Comvest Group's C.J. "Gabe" Gabriel taking over as president and CEO. In November 2011, Haggen began to phase out the Top Foods format by remodeling and rebranding stores to a slightly altered format based on the Haggen Food and Pharmacy concept called, Haggen Northwest Fresh. After closing their Everett and Tanasbourne locations in February 2011, company officials stated that it would not affect their other Oregon locations; the company then announced the closing of the Murray Hill location in March, followed by the Wenatchee location in September.

In October 2012, Briar Development, the Haggen family's holding company for its real estate sold a portfolio consisting of 15 sites of Haggen stores to MGP X properties LLC of San Diego for $175,000,000. Gabriel stepped down as CEO in December 2012 and was replaced by a three-person executive team led by the company's former senior vice-president of merchandising, Clement Stevens. In early 2013 Haggen closed their locations in Tacoma, Lacey, Federal Way, Bellevue and Shoreline, followed later in the year by closures in Kent, Auburn, and Yakima. Despite Clement Stevens stating that the Edmonds location remained viable in December 2013 and suggesting that the closures were finished, both the Edmonds and Arlington locations closed in the summer of 2014.

=== 2015 expansion ===
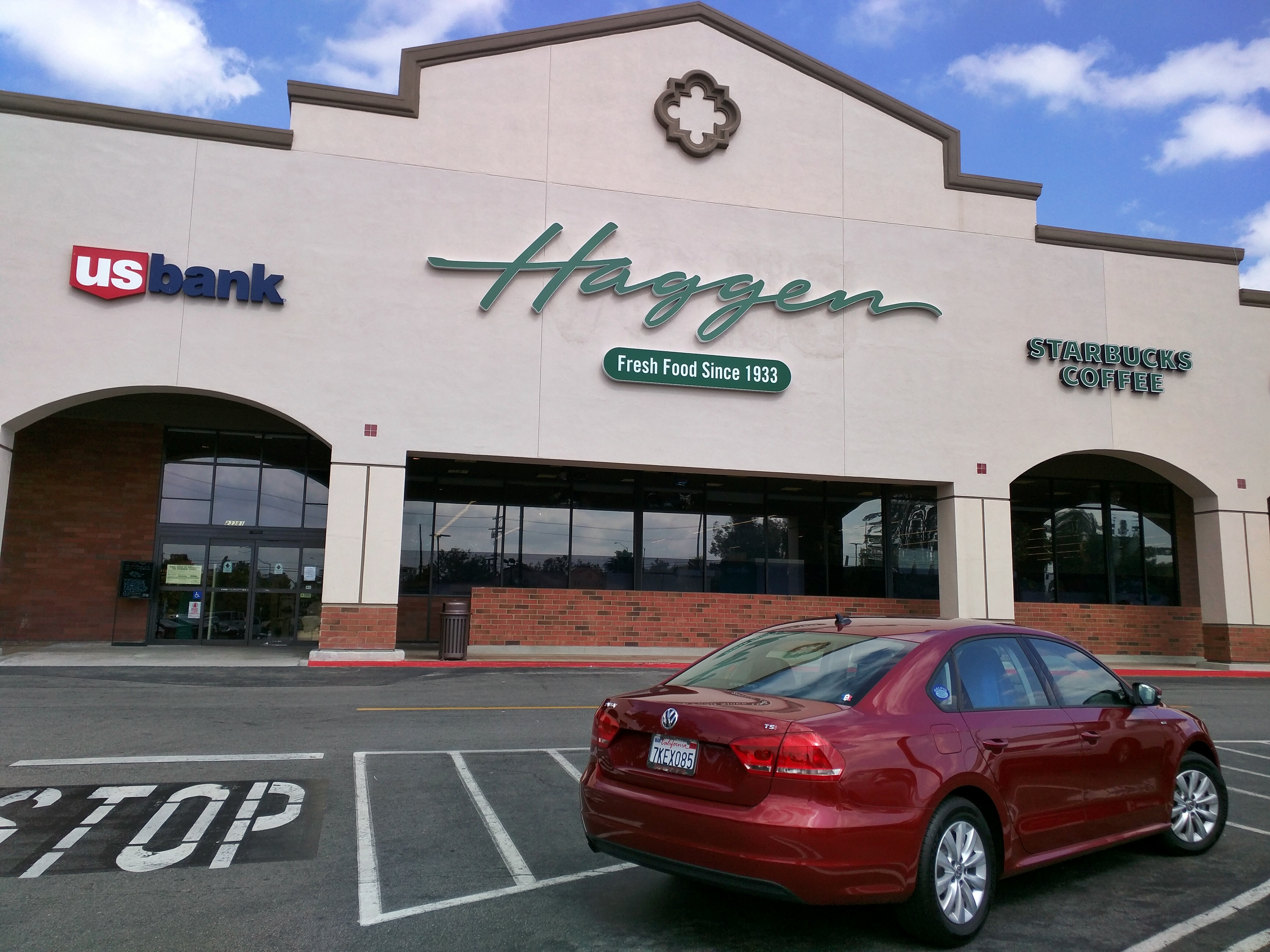
Haggen in Woodland Hills, California, shortly after transitioning from Vons in April 2015. Now subdivided into Pet Food Express and Bristol Farms.

In late 2014, Haggen agreed to purchase and rebrand 146 West Coast Safeway and Albertsons locations over the coming year as part of anti-monopoly requirements following the Albertsons-Safeway merger. This increased the chain's locations from 18 to 164, and its employees from about 2,000 to about 10,000. In Southern California, the rollout of the new Haggen supermarkets were to be phased in between March and June 2015, with the first Haggen store opening in Carlsbad, California, on March 11, 2015. The entire conversion and rebranding process proceeded north to south over the five months from February to June 2015.

On August 14, 2015, Haggen announced that it was closing 27 stores, including 16 supermarkets in California, 5 in Oregon, 5 in Arizona, and 1 in Washington.

On September 1, 2015, Haggen announced that the company had filed a lawsuit against Albertsons LLC and Albertsons Holdings LLC ("Albertsons") seeking more than $1 billion in damages. The complaint, which was filed that day in United States District Court for the District of Delaware, alleged that following Haggen's December 2014 purchase of 146 Albertsons and Safeway stores, Albertsons engaged in "coordinated and systematic efforts to eliminate competition and Haggen as a viable competitor in over 130 local grocery markets in five states," and "made false representations to both Haggen and the FTC about Albertsons' commitment to a seamless transformation of the stores into viable competitors under the Haggen banner."

=== Chapter 11 bankruptcy ===
On September 8, 2015, Haggen Food & Pharmacy filed for Chapter 11 bankruptcy protection and entered talks to sell many Haggen Food & Pharmacy stores. Haggen announced pending closures of all California stores shortly after. On September 24, 2015, Haggen Food & Pharmacy announced its plan to exit from the Pacific Southwest market with all closures complete by mid November 2015. It announced it would realign its operations around 37 core stores and one stand-alone pharmacy in the Pacific Northwest as part of the Chapter 11 process.

A bankruptcy auction for the remaining core 33 stores of the Haggen chain was set for February 5, 2016.

On January 21, 2016, Albertsons settled the Haggen's $1 billion lawsuit for $5.75 million. (Roughly 0.6 cents on the dollar). Albertsons also agreed to transfer its unsecured claim of $8.25 million to Haggen's other creditors in the bankruptcy.

=== Sale to Albertsons ===
On March 11, 2016, Haggen announced it was selling its 29 remaining stores to Albertsons for $106 million. The sale was approved on March 29, 2016. Once completed, 15 stores would still operate under the Haggen name, while the rest would become Albertsons locations, though for many of the locations, this effectively circumvented the FTC's previous mandate for certain Albertsons stores to be sold so as to avoid neighborhood monopolies. The company changed its legal name to HH Legacy, Inc. two months after the sale and was ultimately dissolved on March 25, 2019.
