= Carrs-Safeway =

American supermarket chain in Alaska owned by Albertsons Companies, Inc

Carrs–Safeway
- Type: Subsidiary
- Industry: Retail
- Founded: 1950; 76 years ago
- Headquarters: Anchorage, Alaska
- Number of locations: 24
- Products: Bakery, dairy, delicatessen, frozen foods, fuel, grocery, pharmacy, photographic processing, produce, seafood, snack food, liquor, flowers, Starbucks, and Western Union
- Parent: Safeway (1999–2015); Albertsons (2015–present)
- Subsidiaries: J.B. Gottstein
- Website: www.carrsqc.com

Carrs–Safeway (formerly Carrs Quality Centers) is a supermarket chain that is based in Anchorage, Alaska, and is a subsidiary of Albertsons. It was acquired in April 1999 by former parent Safeway from an employee ownership group, who itself had purchased the company from founder Larry Carr and his partner Barney Gottstein in 1990.

The proposed acquisition led to an antitrust lawsuit filed by the Alaska Public Interest Research Group, which was resolved by a consent decree reached between Safeway and the Alaska Attorney General's office which required the company to divest seven stores. Those stores re-opened as the grocery chain Alaska Marketplace, which closed at the end of 2000. One of those stores, the Foodland Shopping Circle in Fairbanks, one of the earliest stores in the Carrs chain, has remained largely vacant since.

As of 2010, there are 24 stores in Alaska, including: Anchorage, Fairbanks (both in multiple locations), Juneau, Kenai, Homer, Ketchikan, Kodiak, Nome, North Pole, Palmer, Seward, Soldotna, Valdez, Wasilla and Unalaska.

== History ==
=== Beginning ===
Laurence John "Larry" Carr (July 28, 1929 – May 12, 2011) moved to Anchorage, Alaska, in 1947 after graduating from high school in San Bernardino, California. After a short stint in management at the Alaska Railroad commissary, in which he hoped to make enough money to return to California and open a grocery store there, he instead became a competitor in the grocery business in Anchorage.

Carr opened his first store in a Quonset hut, located on the southern end of Gambell Street in the Eastchester (now known as Fairview) neighborhood of Anchorage, in February 1950. The location would prove to be beneficial, as Gambell Street, which became Potter Road after leaving the townsite limits and dead-ended several miles south of town at a railroad section house, soon became the northern terminus of the Seward Highway.

The name Carrs was derived from the original operating partnership of Larry Carr and his brother, Bernard Joseph Carr, Jr. They were joined by their father, Bernard Joseph "Pop" Carr, following his retirement from the Santa Fe Railroad in 1954. The senior Carr left the company in 1964 to launch a successful campaign for the Alaska House of Representatives.

Another person involved in the company during its early days was Bernard J. "Barney" Gottstein. His father, Jacob B. Gottstein, started a wholesale grocery business in Anchorage when the town was founded in 1915. Carr and Gottstein began their formal business partnership in 1960, integrating retail and wholesale grocery operations and real estate development (particularly construction of shopping centers) into one company. Carr and Gottstein were also heavily involved during the 1960s in promoting the business and political career of a recent young arrival to Alaska named Mike Gravel.

=== 1960s–1980s ===
The second Carrs location and associated construction, the Aurora Village Shopping Center, was built in 1966. The Mall at Sears, an enclosed mall with an interior motif resembling a downtown sidewalk, was built the following year. Both were built along Northern Lights Boulevard, which being a section line arterial, was mostly known for illegal drag racing and associated businesses such as drive-in restaurants, as the vast majority of Anchorage's retail landscape was located downtown at the time. The construction of these two malls, combined with the Northern Lights Center constructed by Wally Hickel in 1960, started the shift in customer traffic away from downtown and towards the outlying areas of Anchorage.

These two malls began a pattern of Carrs Grocery and strip mall construction which followed for most of the next two decades. By the mid-1970s, there were Carrs stores throughout southcentral Alaska, as well as the Foodland Shopping Circle in downtown Fairbanks. Carrs operated a warehouse market called Prairie Market in the 1970s and 1980s, with two locations close to the Old Seward Highway in Anchorage.

=== 1990s ===
Carrs stores were primarily located throughout the "Railbelt" area of Alaska. A subsidiary, Eagle Quality Centers, operated in numerous mid-sized and smaller Alaskan communities, both within and outside of the Railbelt. The company branched out into Southeast Alaska in the early 1990s, opening stores in Juneau and Ketchikan.

Carr and Gottstein sold their business in a leveraged buyout to two senior executives of Carr-Gottstein: John Cairns, the company's general manager, and Mark Williams, Carr-Gottstein's vice-president of operations. The price was 250–300 million dollars for 13 Carrs Quality Centers, 15 Oaken Keg liquor stores, 3 Eagle Quality Centers, Gottstein wholesale food business, freight operations, and Carr-Gottstein Properties, a real estate development firm. The company purchased the Fairbanks supermarket chain Super Valu (formerly Market Basket) in 1992.

=== Safeway merger ===
In 1999, Safeway, Inc. acquired Carrs. Due to strong customer loyalty to the Carrs name, the chain was renamed Carrs-Safeway, and customers could opt to use a loyalty card.

=== Aborted sale to C&S Wholesale Grocers, LLC ===
On September 8, 2023, Kroger and Albertsons announced plans to sell off the Carrs brand name, along with 14 stores, to C&S Wholesale Grocers, as a condition of Kroger and Albertsons merger. In July 2024, an updated plan to divest 18 stores was announced. This included all 11 Carrs locations, the 2 Safeway locations in Fairbanks, the Safeway locations in North Pole, Soldotna, Kenai, and Juneau, and the Eagle location in Girdwood. However, on December 10, 2024, the Kroger-Albertsons merger was blocked by the Federal Trade Commission, aborting the sale of Carrs to C&S.

== Fuel stations ==
Carrs/Safeway customers receive fuel discounts when shopping at any participating Carrs/Safeway Store, They must use a Club Card in order to receive points that eventually over time can turn into a discount unless you spent $100 or over in a transaction. A Customer earns points every dollar spent, spend $100 in one transaction and receive a discount for 10 Cents off a gallon up to 25 gallons, These discounts then can be racked up over time to save up to $1.00 off per gallon.

Carrs/Safeway Fuel Rewards has been effective since mid 2011. Safeway adjusted the program in July 2012 for discounts and dropped the "Always get 3 cents off per gallon" discount as well as made the discount gallons drop from 30 gallons to 25 gallons; limiting customers on fuel.

Since 2007, they have operated the seven-store chain "The Great Alaska Tobacco Co" as stand alone stores it is a division of Carrs.
