= United Supermarkets =

American supermarket chain owned by Albertsons Companies, Inc

United Supermarkets, LLC
- Type: Subsidiary
- Industry: Retail
- Founded: 1916 (110 years ago)
- Headquarters: 7830 Orlando Avenue Lubbock, Texas, 79423, United States
- Number of locations: 99
- Area served: North Texas, West Texas, New Mexico
- Key people: Robert C. Taylor, Jr. (CEO); Robert Snell (chairman)
- Products: Bakery, dairy, deli, frozen foods, general grocery, meat, pharmacy, produce, seafood, snacks, beer and wine
- Revenue: $1.5 (est.) billion USD
- Number of employees: 18,000+ (2020)
- Parent: Albertsons (2014–present)
- Website: www.unitedsupermarkets.com

United Supermarkets, LLC, d.b.a. The United Family is an American supermarket chain. With headquarters in Lubbock, Texas, its roots go back to 1916, when H.D. Snell opened his first United Cash Store in Sayre, Oklahoma. The chain has grown to include 99 grocery stores in 54 cities and over 10,000 workers. In 2014 it became a wholly owned subsidiary of Albertsons.

== History ==
United Supermarkets has 99 grocery stores located in Texas and New Mexico and also operates 41 convenience stores as of April 2025. While it shares the same name as United Supermarkets based in Oklahoma (owned by Homeland), it technically does business as The United Family to differentiate from the Oklahoma chain, as they are separate grocery entities.

On April 1, 2009, United opened its 50th store in Plano, Texas.

Most United Supermarkets stores operate from 6 or 7 am until 11 pm, seven days a week. As of February 1, 2016, four stores operate 24 hours a day, including the pharmacy: two stores in Lubbock, one in Wichita Falls, and one in Frisco (Of which is no longer a 24-hour location as of 2019). Two stores were open 24 hours a day temporarily after the opening of the new store. Both were located in Lubbock.

United Supermarkets is run by the Albertsons chain, and operates as a division of Albertsons.

In addition to retail operations The United Family also operates R.C. Taylor Distributing which it purchased in 2007. The company also operates United Food & Beverage Services, United Supermarkets Manufacturing, and Llano Logistics.

=== Acquisition ===
On September 9, 2013, United Supermarkets LLC was sold to Albertsons LLC. On February 4, 2014, the FTC voted 4–0 to approve the deal. The acquisition deal cost Albertsons $385 million and required Albertsons to sell its single stores in the Amarillo and Wichita Falls, Texas, markets. As part of the acquisition, several Albertsons locations in Eastern New Mexico, which were re-branded as "Albertsons Market", were added to the new United division of Albertsons-Safeway. Expansion in New Mexico continued with the purchase of several Lawrence Brothers locations, and the transfer of stores in Albuquerque, Santa Fe, Rio Rancho, and Taos, to the United division.

The United Family operates multiple distinct retail banners:

- United Supermarket - traditional grocery offerings (51 locations as of April 2025, with 1 under construction)
- Market Street - take-out foods, restaurants, gourmet, and everyday grocery items (22 locations as of April 2025)
- Market Street Express - convenience store (5 locations as of April 2025)
- Amigos United - international and American foods (4 locations as of April 2025)
- United Express - take-out foods, café, and gas station (34 locations as of April 2025, with 1 under construction)
- Albertsons Market - traditional American grocery (22 locations as of April 2025, with 1 under construction)
- Albertsons Market Express - convenience store (2 location as of April 2025, with 1 under construction)

== Naming rights ==
United Supermarkets owns the naming rights to United Supermarkets Arena at Texas Tech University. The arena is the home court for the university's men's and women's basketball teams in addition to its women's volleyball team.
