= Albertsons =

American supermarket company

Albertsons Companies, Inc.
- Formerly: Albertson's Inc. (until 2006 sale to Supervalu, Cerberus)
- Type: Public
- Traded as: NYSE: ACI (Class A); S&P 400 component
- Industry: Retail; Grocery
- Founded: July 21, 1939 (87 years ago)
- Founder: Joe Albertson
- Headquarters: Boise, Idaho, U.S.
- Number of locations: 2,271 (December 2023)
- Key people: Jim Donald; (co-chairman); Leonard Laufer; (co-chairman); B. Kevin Turner; (vice chairman); Susan D. Morris; (president & CEO)
- Products: Bakery, dairy, deli, frozen foods, general grocery, meat, pharmacy, produce, seafood, snacks, liquor
- Services: Supermarket
- Revenue: ▲US$83.2 billion (2025)
- Net income: ▼US$217 million (2025)
- Owner: Cerberus Capital Management (26%)
- Number of employees: 325,000 (May 2020)
- Subsidiaries: Acme Markets; Carrs-Safeway; Haggen; Jewel-Osco; Kings; Pavilions; Plated; Randalls; Safeway; Shaw's and Star Market; Tom Thumb; United Supermarkets; Vons
- Website: www.albertsons.com www.albertsonscompanies.com

Albertsons Companies, Inc. is an American grocery company founded and headquartered in Boise, Idaho.

With 2,253 stores as of the third quarter of fiscal year 2020 and 270,000 employees as of fiscal year 2019, the company is the second-largest supermarket chain in North America after Kroger. Albertsons ranked 53rd in the 2018 Fortune 500 list of the largest United States corporations by total revenue. Prior to its January 2015 merger with Safeway Inc. for $9.2 billion, it had 1,075 supermarkets located in 29 U.S. states under 12 different regional banners. Its predecessor company, Albertsons, Inc., was reorganized as Albertsons LLC and sold to AB Acquisition LLC, a Cerberus Capital Management–led consortium. After buying back the majority of its former stores it sold to SuperValu in 2006, AB Acquisition announced it would change its name to Albertsons Companies Inc. in 2015. The company's corporate name was Albertson's Inc. until 2002, when the apostrophe was removed.

On October 14, 2022, Albertsons announced it would be acquired by rival Kroger for $25 billion. On November 30, 2023, Kroger CEO Rodney McMullen announced that the companies had satisfied the informational requirements of the Federal Trade Commission, and the deal was expected to close in early 2024. However, in January 2024, Washington state sued to block the merger, warning that if approved it could raise prices and harm consumers. In February 2024, Colorado attorney general Phil Weiser also filed a lawsuit, saying consumers told him they feared it "would lead to stores closing, higher prices, fewer jobs, worse customer service, and less resilient supply chains." Kroger and Albertsons terminated their merger on December 11, 2024, after it was blocked by a federal and a state judge.

== History ==
=== Beginnings ===
Albertsons was founded in 1939 by Joe Albertson (1906–1993) on July 21 in Boise, Idaho. An ad in Boise's Idaho Statesman newspaper touted Albertson's first store as "Idaho's largest and finest food store." The store was filled with perks that, at the time, were brand new: free parking, a money-back guarantee, and even an ice cream shop. The original store was built onto several times, but it was demolished in 1979, and a replacement store was built on the same property. A brick monument stands on the northwest corner of 16th and State Streets in downtown Boise, commemorating the original store.

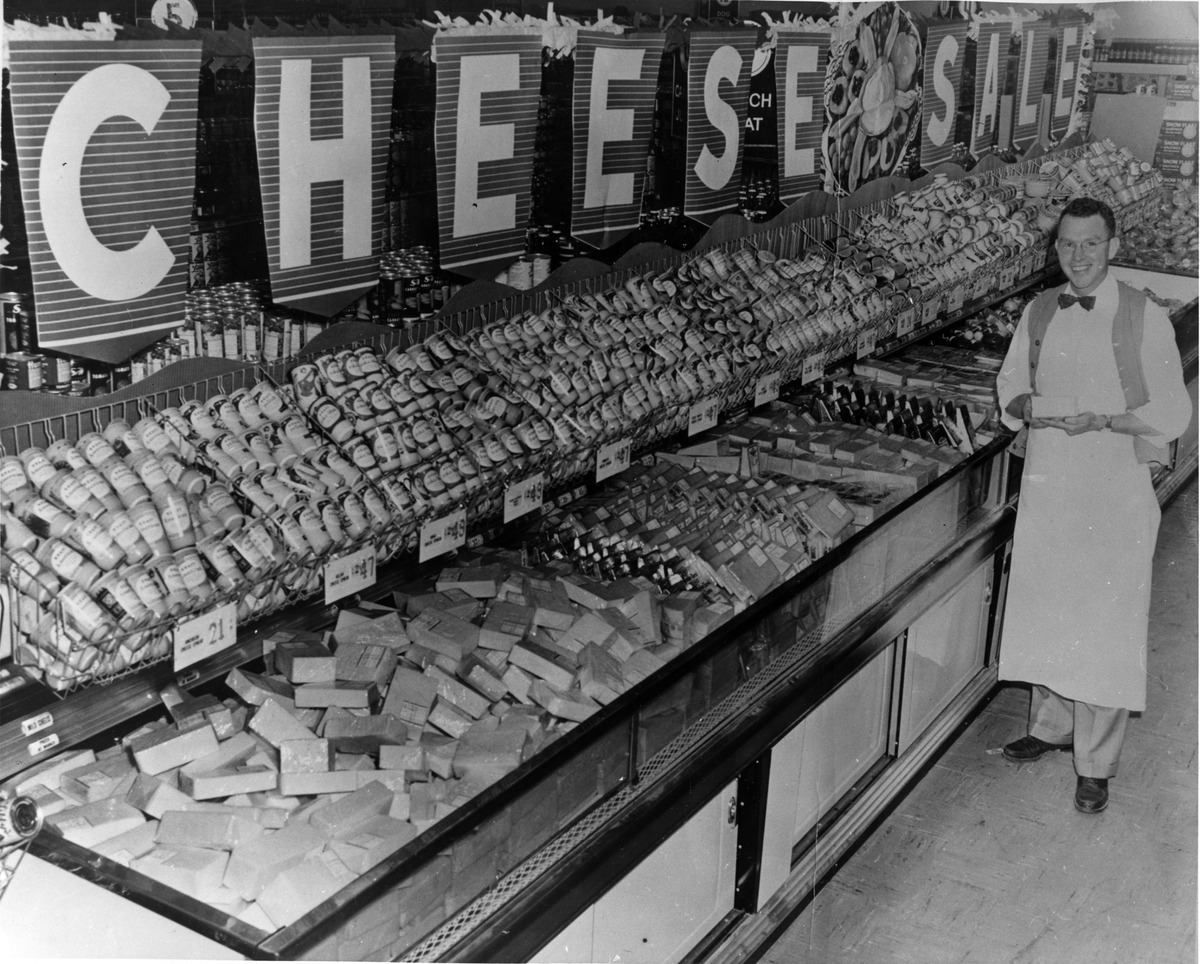
The cheese department of an Albertsons in Seattle (1955)

The grocery store was an enormous success, and Albertson reinvested his profits back into the business. New stores were opened in neighboring towns to the west: Nampa, Caldwell, and Emmett, before America's entry into World War II in late 1941. The company grew steadily in the years following World War II. When Albertson was considering putting a new store in a town, he would drive around the town and look for neighborhoods with children's clothing hanging on clotheslines, and station wagons in driveways; he knew that those kinds of neighborhoods were where he wanted to build his stores.

Albertson's, Inc. became a public company in 1959, and its growth continued, opening its hundredth store in Seattle in 1963. in 1964, Albertsons expanded to Southern California by acquiring All American Markets, a small chain based in Orange County.

In 1967, Albertsons expanded into Colorado, acquiring eight stores from Furr's Supermarkets. By the end of the 1960s, Albertsons operated over 200 stores within a nine-state region and the stores averaged about 20,000 square feet in size.

=== Partnership with Skaggs and 1970s expansion ===
In 1969, Albertsons partnered with Skaggs Drug Centers, owned by the Skaggs Companies, Inc., to create the first combination food/drug stores, first in Texas. The partnership was a tremendous success for several years. The partnership ended due to the fact that it was getting more difficult to control. Neither partner could buy the other out, and the partnership was dissolved amicably in 1977. Skaggs kept stores in Texas, Oklahoma, and Arkansas, and Albertsons kept stores in Florida, Alabama, and Louisiana, as well as some Texas stores (based in San Antonio).

Albertsons continued to expand its base in the West during this time. In 1973, Albertsons opened its first distribution center in Brea, California. In 1974, Albertsons bought the four-store Monte Mart chain in northern California. Albertsons bought Fazio's Shopping Bag in 1978 from Fisher Foods, adding 46 stores in Southern California.

=== Expansion in the 1980s ===
In 1981, Albertsons entered Nebraska and South Dakota.

In 1982, Albertsons reorganized its management into four regions: California, Northwest, Intermountain, and South. Albertsons continued to add stores in the 1980s, building or acquiring about 283 stores during the decade. Albertsons continued to expand in Texas beyond the Skaggs base in north Texas and San Antonio, re-entering the Dallas–Fort Worth market in 1984, and adding three Skaggs-Alpha Beta stores in Austin within months after entering that market in early 1989 with the acquisition of six Tom Thumb stores.

Albertsons built its first fully mechanized distribution center in Portland, Oregon, in 1988.

In 1989, Albertsons opened its 500th store, in Temecula, California.

=== Expansion in the 1990s ===
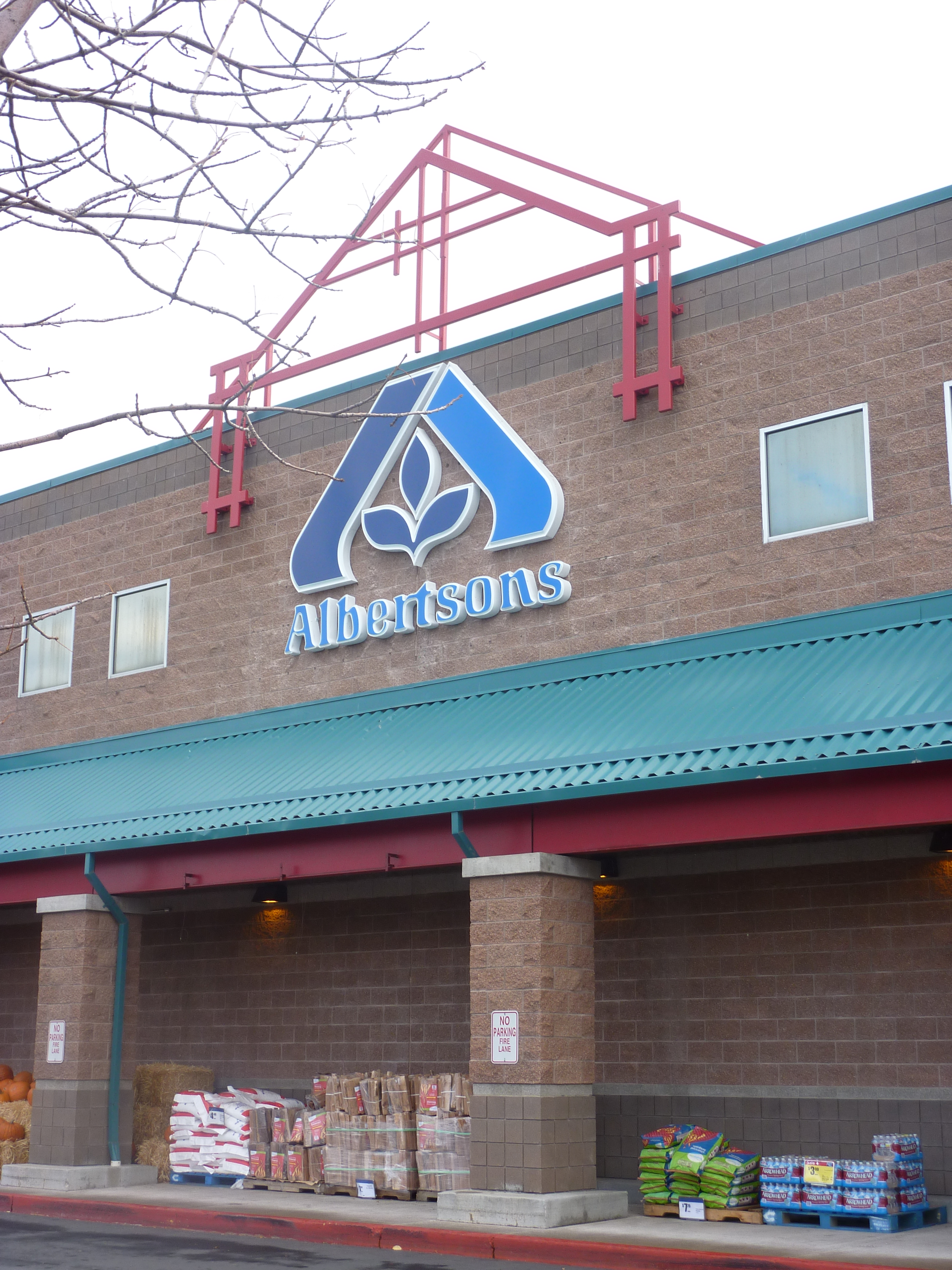
An Albertsons that converted from Buttrey Food and Drug in Missoula, Montana

Albertsons began to expand heavily in the 1990s. In 1992, Albertsons bought the stores American Stores (formerly Skaggs Drugs Cos.) had in Texas, Oklahoma, Arkansas, and Florida. Many of the stores had been opened as Skaggs Albertsons originally (later turning into "Skaggs Alpha Beta" under American Stores ownership) but by 1991 had been rebranded as Jewel-Osco. These included a few stores that American Stores opened in the late 1980s under that name in Florida. Additionally, a non-food distribution center in Ponca City, Oklahoma, was purchased from ASC.

In 1994, Albertsons would acquire four stores from San Diego County chain Big Bear Markets.

The Skaggs acquisition was a success, and the new stores were integrated into Albertsons's Southern division. In a series of acquisitions in the late 1990s, Albertsons purchased Seessel's and 14 other stores from Bruno's, Buttrey Food & Drug (divesting seven Buttrey stores and six Albertsons stores to Smith's and another two Buttrey stores to SuperValu), the Springfield, Missouri Smitty's chain, and three Super One Foods stores from Miner's Inc. in the Des Moines market, all while building new stores across all divisions. These acquisitions brought Albertsons into five new states: Georgia, Iowa, Missouri, North Dakota, and Tennessee.

==== Albertsons Express gas stations ====
Albertsons launched a new branch of their brand in 1997, Albertsons Express, which included a fuel center and a convenience store. The first of the Albertsons Express opened that year in Eagle, Idaho. This branch was constructed in front of the parking lot of Albertson's full-size grocery store at Eagle Rd and Plaza Dr. This concept was not limited to Idaho; it expanded to locations across America located on Albertsons’ existing/new stores properties. A few of the locations with Express Gas Stations include Gresham, Hillsboro, and Portland in Oregon; Houston in Texas; and Casper and Cheyenne in Wyoming.

==== American Stores acquisition ====
In 1998, Albertsons made its largest acquisition to date, American Stores Company, which included the chains ACME in Pennsylvania, New Jersey, Maryland, and Delaware; Lucky in California and Nevada; Jewel and Jewel-Osco in Illinois, Indiana, and Iowa, and two drug store chains: Osco Drug, with a presence in New England, the Midwest, Montana and Arizona; and Sav-on Drugs, with a presence in Southern California, Nevada, Western Arizona, and New Mexico. The acquisition briefly made Albertsons the largest American food and drug operator, with over 2,500 stores (including stand-alone drug stores) in 37 states, until Kroger's acquisition of Fred Meyer closed the following month. To make the acquisition, Albertsons was forced by anti-trust concerns to divest 146 stores in California, Nevada, and New Mexico to Certified Grocers, Raley's, Ralphs, Stater Bros., and Vons. In California, Nevada, and New Mexico, there were already Albertsons stores, so in order to not have two banners in the same area, 508 Lucky stores were converted to the Albertsons banner in November 1999, and the Lucky brand name was retired. The brand was reintroduced in the mid 2000s.

In January 2001, Albertsons restructured its "districts" to a divisional structure mostly based around distribution centers, with a drug store division and 18 regional division offices.

=== 2001–2004 restructuring ===
On July 18, 2001, Larry Johnston, the new chairman and CEO of Albertson's, announced it would close 165 "underperforming" stores spread across 25 states, cut jobs, and reduce its newly created operating divisions. The first change was that the Utah, Idaho, and Big Sky (Montana) division were merged back into Intermountain, while Oregon, Washington, and the Inland Empire (eastern Washington and Northern Idaho) division would be consolidated back into a single Northwestern division. Albertsons sold its freestanding Osco Drug stores in New England to Jean Coutu Group, a Canadian drug store company (those stores were re-branded as Brooks Pharmacy after the sale was completed in January 2002). In 2001, the short-lived Des Moines stores would close as well and Albertsons began to issue Albertsons Preferred Savings Cards for all of its stores.

The following year, three more divisions were closed entirely:

- San Antonio: Having been in San Antonio since the Skaggs Albertsons days, at the time Albertsons was ranked as the area's number two grocer by market share, compared to H-E-B's top position in the market. At the time of the withdrawal, the 44-store H-E-B chain held a 61 percent market share, while Albertsons held a 15 percent market share. Albertsons had held the third position at the time Kroger exited the market in mid-1993 when it closed its 15 area stores. Then, H-E-B's 37 area stores held a 43.2 percent market share, Kroger's 15 area stores a 13.7 percent share, and Albertsons's 10 stores a 13.1 percent share. The remaining stores in the San Antonio division, primarily in the Austin area, became part of the Dallas division. The last store in South Texas to close, a store in Victoria, was closed in October.
- Mid-South: In 2002, Albertsons shuttered its Mid-South division by selling its Seessel's supermarket chain in Memphis to Schnucks and stores in Mississippi to Brookshire's. The Albertsons-branded stores in the Nashville area, most of which had previously been Bruno's stores under the Foodmax banner, were sold to either Publix (marking its entry into the market) or Kroger. The Chattanooga area stores were all shuttered.
- Houston: After entering the market in the early 1990s, Albertsons closed its 43 Houston-area stores, with most reopening as Kroger or Randalls (acquired with Safeway in 2015 and subsequent return to Houston), with two of them becoming H-E-B stores. The Louisiana stores from that division joined the Florida division (though they would move to the Dallas division soon after), while the stores in the Bryan–College Station area became part of the Dallas division. The Greater Houston distribution center near Katy, built in 1996 was sold to 99 Cents Only Stores in 2003.

Additionally, the distribution center in Tulsa, Oklahoma, (home of the Great Plains division) was sold to Fleming Companies, though no stores were closed. The Great Plains division stretched all the way into Omaha, Nebraska. The sale of the distribution center included a distribution deal for Fleming to continue to supply Oklahoma and Omaha. Albertsons sold its locations in southwest Missouri to Missouri-based Ramey/Price Cutter.

After stabilizing the company's finances and consolidating divisions in 2004, Albertsons acquired Shaw's Supermarkets and Star Market from Sainsbury's for $2.5 billion. Albertsons also purchased Bristol Farms for $135 million. During the same time, Albertsons exited the markets of Omaha, where it closed or sold 21 stores, and New Orleans, Louisiana, where it closed seven, selling four to A&P, which converted them to Sav-A-Center.

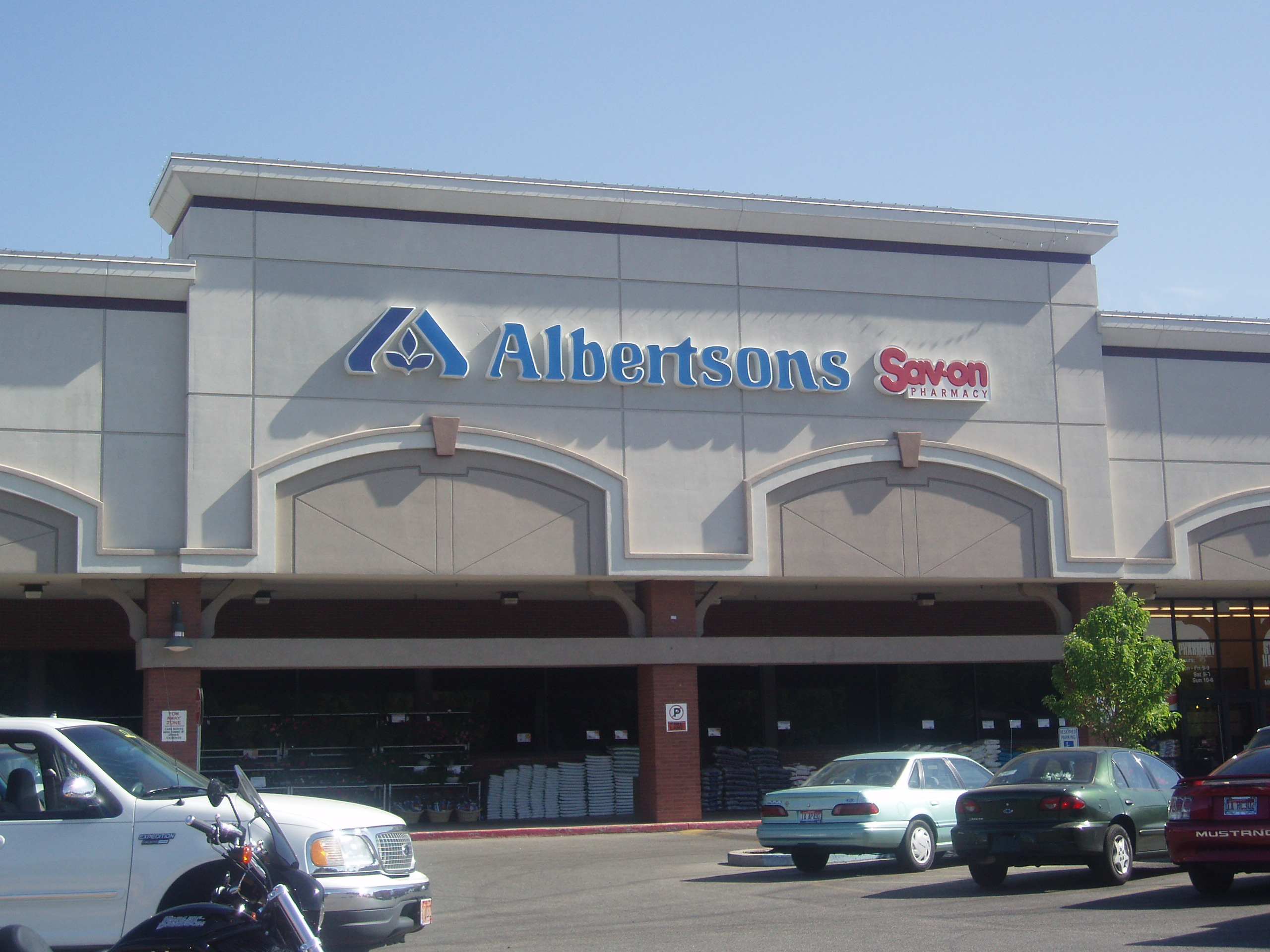
A typical Albertsons in Boise, Idaho, in June 2007 (Store #162)

=== Sale to Cerberus and SuperValu ===
The acquisition spree caused significant problems for Albertsons. Many of the acquired chains had systems that did not mesh well with Albertsons. Financing those acquisitions required Albertsons to take on significant debt. Added to those problems were significant changes in consumer buying patterns, including new competition from large discounters such as Walmart and Costco that impacted sales.

After several assessments of the company and months of rumors, it was announced on January 23, 2006, Albertsons was to be sold to a consortium of companies. SuperValu would take the bulk of the company including the brand names and what was considered to be the stronger divisions, including three Albertsons divisions: the Southern California division (Southern California; Southern Nevada; along with stores in Hanford and Tulare, in Northern California), the Northwest division (Oregon except Ontario, Washington State, and the Idaho Panhandle), and the Intermountain division (Southern Idaho; Elko, Nevada; Utah; Jackson and Rock Springs, Wyoming; Montana; Ontario, Oregon; and North Dakota) as well as the ACME, Bristol Farms, Jewel-Osco, and Shaw's Supermarkets and Star Market brands. This acquisition would also lead to SuperValu gaining access to over 100 Albertsons Express fuel centers.

CVS would acquire 702 stand-alone Osco and Sav-on Drug stores and converted them to CVS Pharmacy stores. They also closed about 100 of the 702.

What was left of Albertsons Inc. became Albertsons, LLC, purchased by a Cerberus-led group of investors, and CVS Pharmacy. The acquisition was completed on June 2, 2006, with the Cerberus-led group (who also included Kimco Realty Corporation, Schottenstein Stores Corp., Lubert-Adler Partners, and Klaff Realty). They held Albertsons LLC as "AB Acquisition LLC". Albertsons LLC included 661 stores and the distribution centers and offices from five of Albertsons divisions. These five divisions were thought to be Albertsons' five weakest divisions, and conventional wisdom in the industry was that the stores would eventually be closed or sold to other operators.

As of June 2, 2006, the company's retail stores were divided as follows:

- SuperValu had acquired 1,124 stores in the deal, including:
  - ACME (134 locations)
  - ACME Express, Jewel Express, and Albertsons Express (107 fuel centers)
  - Albertsons (564 locations in Southern California, Idaho, Montana, Nevada, North Dakota, Oregon, Utah, Washington and Wyoming) – New Albertsons Inc. (later sold to Albertsons LLC)
  - Bristol Farms (11 locations)
  - Jewel and Jewel-Osco (198 locations)
  - Lazy Acres (1 location)
  - Max Foods (4 locations) (3 converted into Lucky, 1 became Albertsons in July 2006)
  - Osco Pharmacy and Sav-on Pharmacy (906 in-store pharmacies)
  - Save-A-Lot (2 stores franchised by Shaw's)
  - Shaw's (169 locations)
  - Star Market (20 locations)
  - Distribution centers (11 centers)
- CVS acquired all (approximately 702) of the stand-alone Osco Drug and Sav-on Drugs rebranding them all as CVS Pharmacy, though they closed approximately 100 of the acquired stores. Many CVS locations were close to Sav-on stores. CVS also acquired one distribution center.
- The Cerberus-led Albertsons LLC retained:
  - Albertsons (655 locations in Arizona, Northern California, Colorado, Florida, Louisiana, New Mexico, Oklahoma, Texas, and Wyoming – Albertsons LLC)
  - County Line Liquors (1 location)
  - Grocery Warehouse (1 location)
  - Jewel-Osco (2 locations)
  - Max Foods (2 locations)
  - Super Saver Foods (23 locations, 21 closed in late 2006)

Following the sale, Albertson's, Inc., was removed from the NYSE. Albertsons LLC was technically the successor company to Albertsons according to SEC filings but it was New Albertsons Inc. that assumed most of the debt, got most of the property, and transitioned Albertsons stock into SuperValu stock.

The five Albertsons Inc. divisions that remained as Albertsons LLC were the Dallas/Fort Worth division (Texas excluding El Paso, Oklahoma, Louisiana, and Arkansas), the Rocky Mountain division (Colorado, Wyoming excluding Rock Springs and Jackson stores, Nebraska, and South Dakota), the Southwest division (Arizona, New Mexico and El Paso, Texas), the Florida division (Florida), and the Northern California division (northern California excluding Hanford and Tulare stores, and northern Nevada). Albertsons LLC then concentrated on rebuilding market share and its store base in its stronger areas and divesting stores and other property in its weaker areas.

On June 6, 2006, only one week after Albertsons LLC was created, the company announced its intent to close 100 Albertsons stores by August 2006, including all but two Super Saver stores. Those closures were spread across all five divisions. Soon after, the company announced that it would be shutting down its online delivery service on July 21, 2006. To distinguish the two companies, Albertsons LLC created a second website, AlbertsonsMarket.com.

=== A leaner company ===
In November 2006, it was announced that the Northern California division, consisting of stores located in northern California and northern Nevada, would be sold to Save Mart, with the deal closing in late February 2007. The company gradually converted all the stores to its Save Mart banner over summer 2007, except for stores in the San Francisco Bay area, which were rebranded as Lucky. The deal included two Northern California distribution centers. Most of the Albertsons locations had originally been branded as Lucky before Albertson's 1998 purchase of American Stores.

Most of the changes in the next six years would downscale the remaining divisions. In the Dallas–Fort Worth division, in 2007, the distribution center was sold and outsourced to Associated Wholesale Grocers, and Albertsons would exit both Oklahoma and Austin. The Oklahoma stores were sold to Associated Wholesale Grocers members while the Austin stores were sold to H-E-B. With the closures, only four stores south of the Dallas–Fort Worth area existed in Texas, all of which were closed or sold by December 2011. Additionally, many of the Dallas–Fort Worth metroplex stores closed during this time, even into 2011.

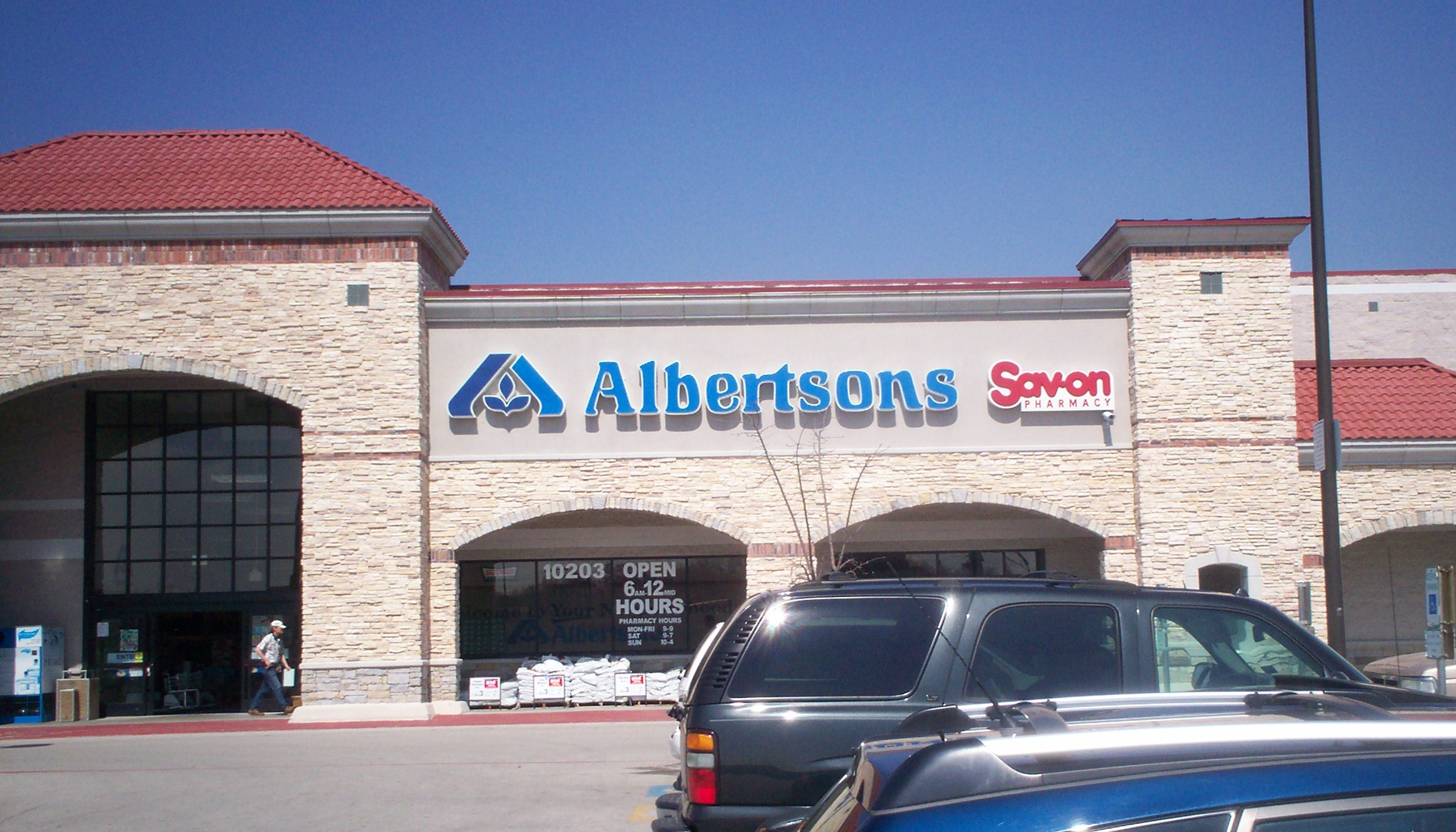
A typical Albertsons-Savon store in Dallas, Texas, in October 2005 (Store #4297). This store was later sold as part of FTC-ordered divestment, and later became Minyard Sun Fresh Market, but has since closed.

In June 2008, Albertsons LLC entered into an agreement with Lakeland, Florida-based Publix stores to sell 49 Florida Albertsons locations to the chain. This included 15 stores in Northern and Northwest Florida, 30 locations in Central Florida, and four locations in South Florida. The sale was completed in September. In April 2012, the company closed most of its stores in Florida. The Plant City distribution center was sold to Gordon Food Service though the Florida Division continued to be located there. By April 2012, only four stores remained in the entire state of Florida.

The Rocky Mountain division slowly shed stores. By April 2007, there were only 32 stores left in the state of Colorado. In December 2007, SuperValu acquired the eight remaining Wyoming locations from Albertson's LLC not already owned by the company. These stores continued to operate under the Albertsons banner. 2008 also brought the sale of Albertsons' lone South Dakota and Nebraska stores to Nash Finch. In August 2009, the distribution center and division office closed and the 26 remaining stores moved to the Southwest division.

Only the Southwest division was spared the major cuts suffered by the other divisions. On June 12, 2007, Albertsons LLC agreed to acquire all Raley's locations in New Mexico. The acquisition includes one closed and eight operating stores in Albuquerque and one store in Taos, thus doubling Albertsons store base in the Albuquerque metro.

In June 2007, Albertson's LLC decided to discontinue its Preferred Savings Card Program, choosing instead to offer discounted items to all of its customers. In September 2007, all Albertsons stores in the Dallas/Fort Worth, Texas, and Florida markets began collecting their Albertsons Preferred Savings Cards.

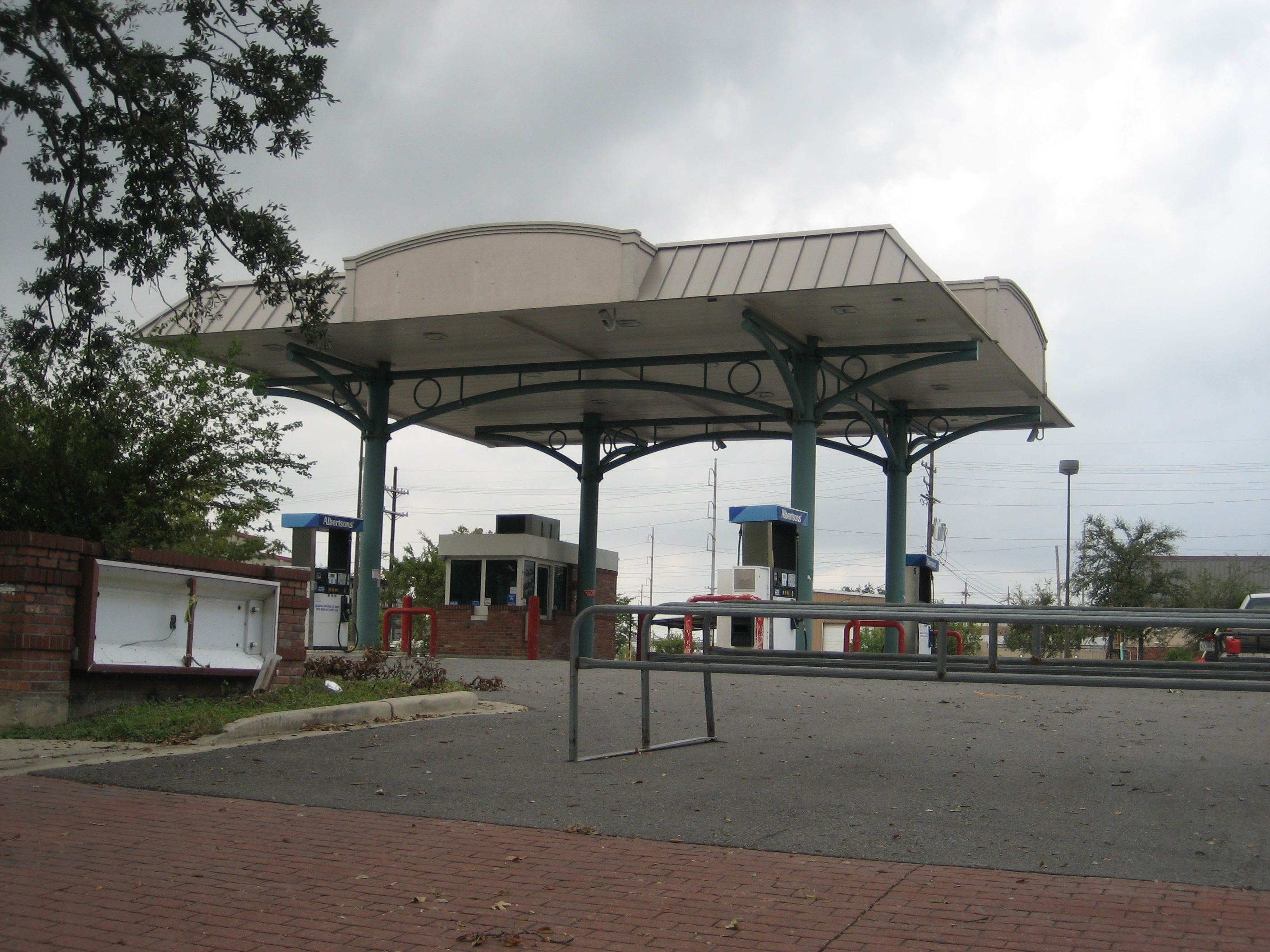
An Albertsons Express that closed due to Hurricane Katrina, located in New Orleans, Louisiana

==== End of the first generation of Albertsons Express ====
Beginning in 2008, Albertsons began exiting the fuel business, selling 72 of over one hundred Albertsons Express gas stations to Valero Energy, which converted most of them to Corner Store locations. It would not be until 2011–2013 that most of the Albertsons Express locations were divested under the Supervalu company. Even then, some locations including Hillsboro still displayed Albertsons Express banners.

=== New Albertsons acquisition ===
While Albertsons LLC had restored its stores to profitability, SuperValu's New Albertsons Inc. had done poorly. While SuperValu did remodel many stores and open a few new stores, New Albertsons had shrunk. Of the 1100+ stores SuperValu acquired in 2006, fewer than 900 remained by 2013. Under SuperValu, Bristol Farms had been sold off, 36 Utah stores were sold to Associated Food Stores (leaving just three traditional Albertsons stores in the state), the Wisconsin Jewel-Osco stores had been sold or closed, as well as the Shaw's stores in Connecticut. Additionally, like Albertsons LLC, most of the fuel stations had been shuttered or sold to other operators.

On January 10, 2013, it was announced that SuperValu was selling New Albertsons (Albertsons, ACME, Shaw's/Star Market, and Jewel-Osco) to Cerberus Capital Management. The deal was closed in March 2013. On February 23, 2013, AB Acquisition announced it would split operations of the newly combined company into eight divisions: Northwestern, Intermountain, Southern California, Southern, Jewel-Osco, ACME, Shaw's, and Southwestern, and in March 2013, the deal was officially closed. On paper, Albertsons LLC controlled the Albertsons-branded stores and New Albertsons Inc. controlled ACME, Shaw's/Star Market, and Jewel-Osco, but it was operated as one company.

On June 11, 2013, Albertsons announced its plans to merge its duplicate websites, social media accounts and mobile apps onto one of each kind, ending the use of the Albertsons Market branding (though this was never used on store exteriors) and AlbertsonsMarket.com. While its website consolidation appeared to take place as expected, its applications received bad reviews—but the biggest consequence was the mistaken deletion of their previous Facebook page and loss of over 200,000 fans. While no details were given as to the mistake made, Albertsons simply admitted that while attempting to join their Albertsons page with over 200,000 Likes and their Albertsons Market page with over 80,000 Likes, something went wrong resulting in the loss of thousands of Likes and comments.

That same month, Albertsons did away with the Preferred Savings Card in the former SuperValu stores that Albertsons LLC had dispensed with in 2007. The cards briefly continued in Southern California stores before being discontinued in July 2013.

=== United Supermarkets acquisition ===
On September 9, 2013, the company acquired Lubbock-based supermarket United Supermarkets LLC. On February 4, 2014, the FTC voted 4–0 to approve the deal. The acquisition deal cost Albertsons $385 million and required Albertsons to sell its single stores in the Amarillo, Texas, and Wichita Falls, Texas, markets. The United Supermarkets family brands include Market Street, Amigos, and United Express.

After the deal was finalized, the Albertsons Market brand was revived for Albertsons stores operated by United. The first to be branded as such opened in Alamogordo, New Mexico, in January 2015.

=== Safeway acquisition ===
On February 19, 2014, Safeway began to explore selling itself, and by February 21, 2014, it was in advanced negotiations with Cerberus Capital Management. On March 6, 2014, Cerberus (parent company of Albertsons) announced it would purchase Safeway for $9.4 billion in a deal expected to close in the 4th quarter of the year.

On July 25, 2014, Safeway stockholders approved the merger with Albertsons.

In December 2014, Albertsons announced that the Haggen Company, a Bellingham, Washington, based grocery chain, was buying 146 Safeway, Albertsons and Vons stores, as required by the antitrust review of the merger.

On January 30, 2015, Albertsons officially acquired Safeway Inc. after being cleared by the FTC, thus giving it control of the Safeway store banners, including Randalls, Tom Thumb, Carrs Safeway, Vons, and Pavilions, plus Safeway's 49% share of Casa Ley, a Mexican grocery chain. Following the merger, Albertsons announced the new company would have 14 divisions led by three regional offices.

East Region

- Acme Division: East Region, existing Acme Markets (based in Malvern, PA).
- Eastern Division: East Region, existing Eastern Division of Safeway (based in Lanham, MD). Includes stores in Maryland and Virginia.
- Jewel-Osco Division: East Region, existing Jewel-Osco (based in Itasca, IL).
- Shaw's Division: East Region, existing Shaw's/Star Market (based in West Bridgewater, MA).

North Region

- Denver Division: North Region, existing Safeway Denver division with some Albertsons stores from Intermountain. Includes stores in most of Colorado (except for the Grand Junction stores which are part of Intermountain, and the Durango stores which are part of Southwest), the eastern two-thirds of Wyoming, all of Nebraska and South Dakota, and Farmington, New Mexico.
- Intermountain Division: North Region, most of the existing Albertsons division with some Safeway stores from the Seattle Division. Includes all stores in North Dakota, most of Idaho except for the northern panhandle (which is part of the Seattle Division), most of Utah except for the far southern portion (which is part of the Southwest Division), northeastern Nevada, the western third of Wyoming, and stores in the Grand Junction, Colorado area.
- Northern California Division: North Region, existing Safeway division (based in Pleasanton, California). Includes stores in northern California and northwestern Nevada.
- Portland Division: North Region, existing Safeway Portland division with Albertsons stores from Northwestern in Oregon. Includes the entire state of Oregon except for Ontario, plus Clark County, Washington.
- Seattle Division: North Region, existing Safeway division with some Albertsons stores from Northwestern. Includes all stores in the state of Washington (except Clark County) and in the northern Idaho Panhandle.

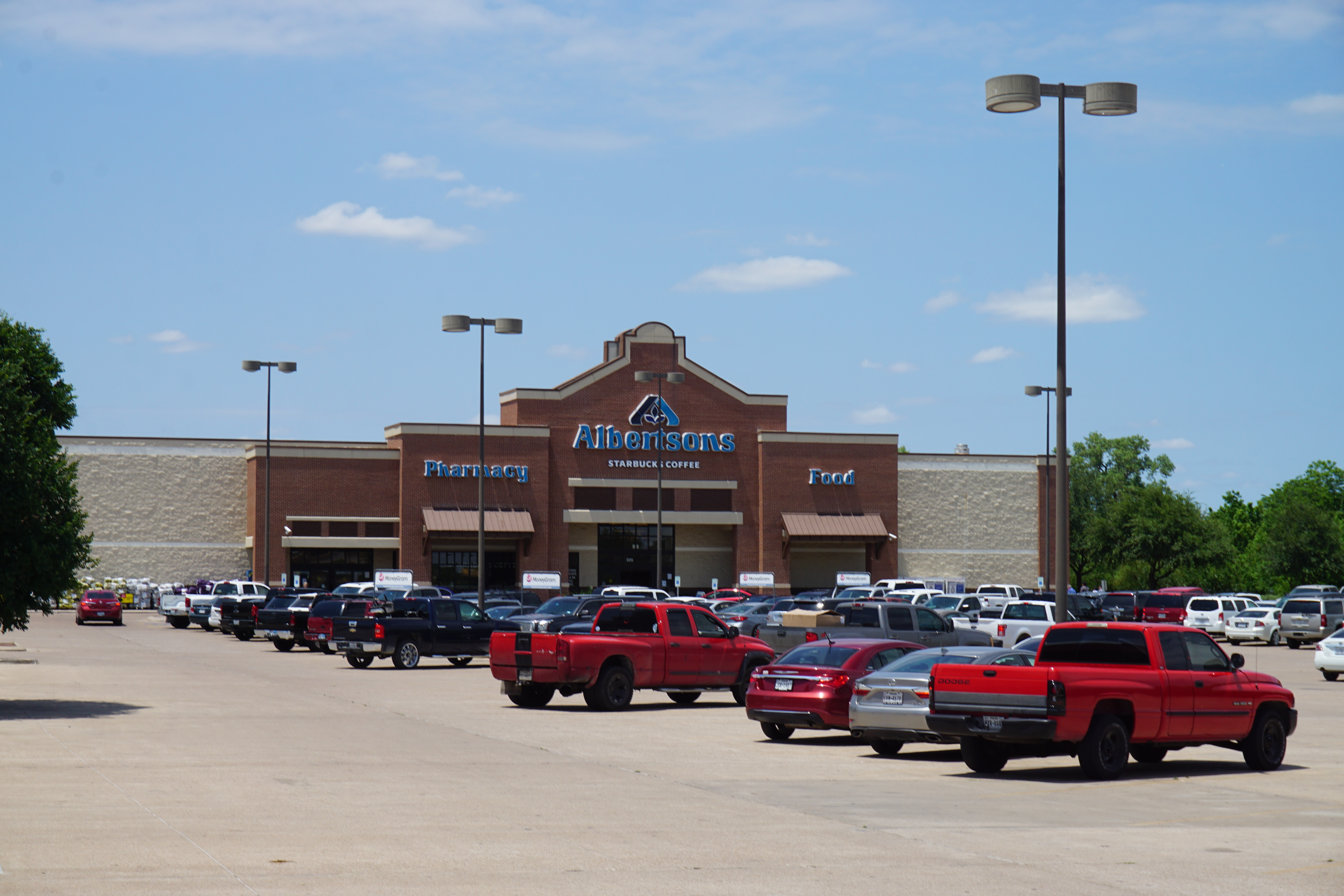
Albertsons in Weatherford, Texas in May 2017 (Store #4176)

South Region

- Houston Division: South Region, existing Randalls/Tom Thumb division of Safeway, with the inclusion of South's Florida stores and southern Louisiana stores. Tom Thumb moved to Southern Division. Includes stores in Houston and Austin-areas and all Louisiana and Florida stores.
- Southern Division: South Region, existing Albertsons South division (based in Fort Worth, Texas) combined with Tom Thumb stores. Includes stores in northeastern Texas, northern Louisiana, and all of Arkansas.
- Southern California Division: South Region, merged Vons Safeway division (excluding southern Nevada/Las Vegas stores, which became part of the new Southwest Division) with Albertsons division (based in Fullerton, California). Includes stores in southern California.
- Southwest Division: South Region, merged Southwest Safeway and Albertsons divisions (based in Phoenix). Includes all stores in Arizona, southern Nevada, and Utah, most of New Mexico (except for Farmington which is part of the Denver Division and southeastern New Mexico which is part of the United Division), and El Paso, Texas.
- United Division: South Region, existing United division (based in Lubbock). Includes stores in the Texas Panhandle and western Texas (excluding El Paso, which is part of the Southwest Division), and southeastern New Mexico.

=== Announcement and postponement of going public and A&P acquisition ===
After several months of rumors, the combined operation announced it would go public as Albertsons Companies, Inc. (the new name of AB Acquisition LLC). Albertsons attempted to IPO with the ticker ABS on October 14, 2015, planning to raise as much as $1.7 billion, selling 65.3 million shares with a range of $23-26 per share. However, the company postponed the listing due to market conditions, particularly after Wal-Mart warned of more challenged sales earlier that day. Albertsons has reportedly postponed the IPO indefinitely, as of October 2015. All during this time, Albertsons continued to expand, purchasing 70 stores owned by the bankrupt Great Atlantic & Pacific Tea Company (operating under the names of The Food Emporium, A&P, A&P Fresh, Superfresh, and Pathmark), which were quickly reopened as ACME stores after two-day store resets.

=== Post-Safeway: Acquisitions, conversions, expansions, and selloffs ===
As a result of the Albertsons-Safeway merger, Albertsons began to look to divest some stores in geographies where the merger could cause a high market share. Some of these stores including one Albertsons and three Safeway stores in Wyoming were sold off to Ridley's Family Markets.

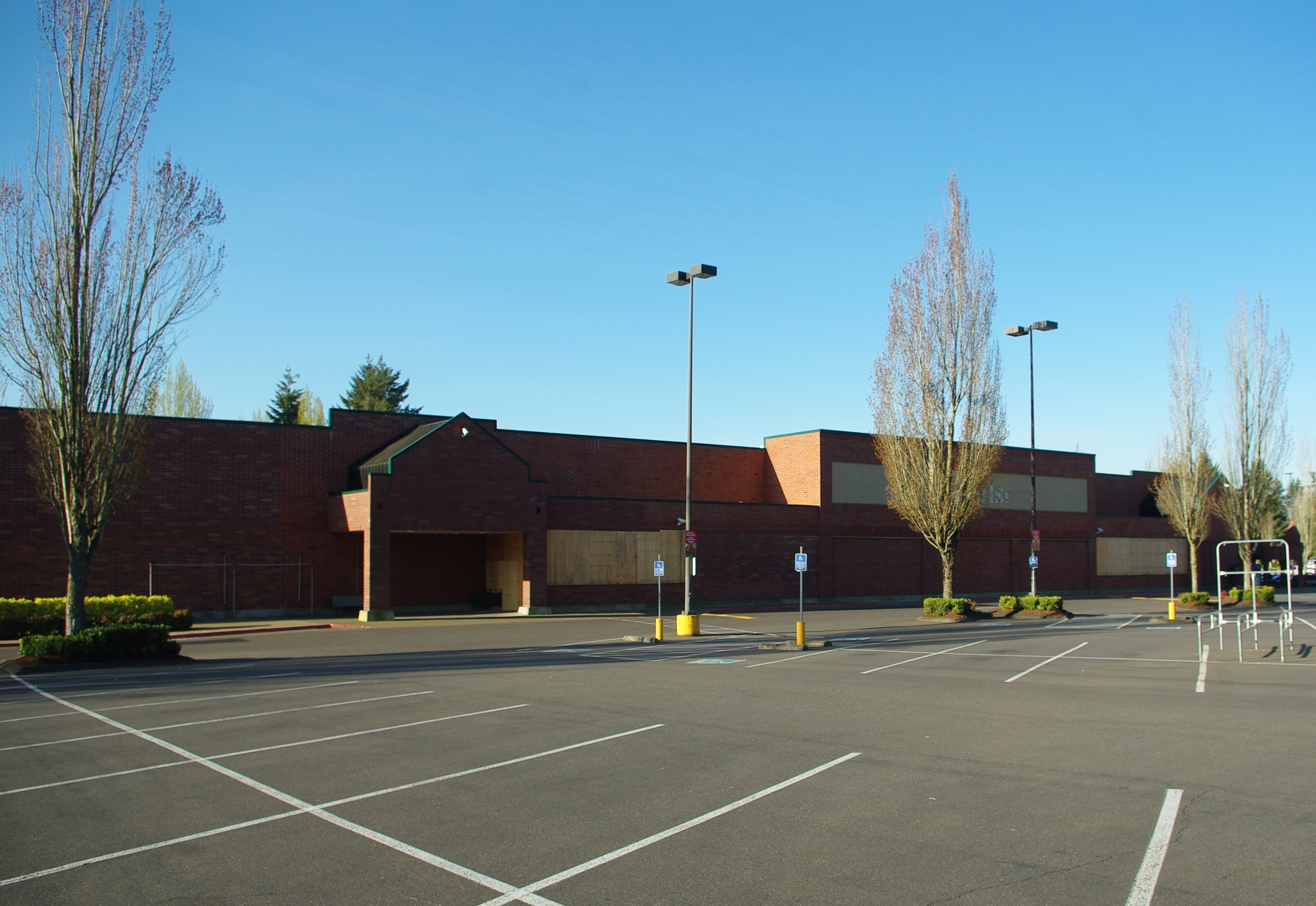
An Albertsons that turned into Haggen before shuttering in Tigard, OR

Also at the time of the Albertsons-Safeway merger, the 18-store Pacific Northwest chain Haggen purchased 146 West Coast Vons, Pavilions, Albertsons, and Safeway locations that had to be sold due to anti-trust concerns, paying $300 million, plus spending $100 million to rebrand the stores. The FTC had hoped this would create a regional competitor for Albertsons. On September 1, 2015, Haggen announced that the company had filed a lawsuit against Albertsons, seeking more than $1 billion in damages. The complaint, which was filed that day in United States District Court for the District of Delaware, alleged that following Haggen's December 2014 purchase of 146 Albertsons and Safeway stores, Albertsons engaged in "coordinated and systematic efforts to eliminate competition and Haggen as a viable competitor in over 130 local grocery markets in five states", and "made false representations to both Haggen and the FTC about Albertsons's commitment to a seamless transformation of the stores into viable competitors under the Haggen banner".

A week later Haggen filed for Chapter 11 bankruptcy and began the process of closing all but a few dozen 'core' stores in the Pacific Northwest. Albertsons would buy back 33 of the stores being sold at auction. In January 2016, Albertsons settled the lawsuit, agreeing to pay $5.75 million to Haggen, and subsequently reached an agreement to acquire the remaining 29 'core' Haggen stores located in Washington and Oregon for $106 million, the deal being approved on March 29, 2016. As part of the deal, 15 stores would still operate under the Haggen banner, with the rest converted to Albertsons locations.

During this time, the Albertsons family experienced further changes. On January 11, 2016, it was announced that the three remaining Albertsons stores in Florida, located in Largo, Altamonte Springs and Oakland Park, would be re-bannered as Safeway; this marked the first time that the Safeway brand would exist on a supermarket operation in Florida. It would also re-align the stores toward the Eastern Division. In 2016, smaller acquisitions included Homedale, Idaho-based Paul's Market and Santa Rosa, California-based G&G Supermarkets. Both brands were closed before they were converted into Albertsons and Safeway stores, respectively. Additionally, the United Supermarkets subsidiary acquired seven locations from Sweetwater, Texas-based Lawrence Brothers. These were converted into United Supermarkets or Albertsons Market stores. In late 2016, it was announced that Andronico's in the San Francisco area would be acquired as well. These stores would become "Safeway Community Markets" and still hold what made Andronico's unique, including chef-prepared items. When the first store reopened in February 2017 under the ownership of the Northern California division, it was still bannered as Andronico's due to an issue in obtaining local permits but the other stores were able to reopen as Safeway Community Markets.

On February 17, 2017, the Randalls store in south Katy, Texas, serving the Cinco Ranch area closed. On March 6, 2017, shortly after the Katy Randalls closure, it was announced that the Houston-area distribution center near Cypress, Texas, would be closed and the operations consolidated in the Roanoke, Texas, Tom Thumb distribution center in the Dallas–Fort Worth metroplex to supply the Houston- and Austin-area stores instead. Also, the Houston Division offices would be folded into the legacy Albertsons's South Division offices in Fort Worth. Additionally, the stores in the Albuquerque market were realigned toward the United Supermarkets division. On September 20, 2017, Albertsons acquired meal kit company Plated for $200 million.

During the time after the Albertsons-Safeway merger, Albertsons was experimenting with different banners, converting many stores to Safeway, including many Colorado Albertsons locations. With this rebranding also came additional closures, such as Centennial, Colorado. Some exceptions include Pueblo and Durango in Colorado, which are owned by a different division.

==== Albertsons Express expansion ====
To start off 2018, Albertsons began to reenter the fuel market, opening a brand new Albertsons Express in Boise, Idaho, at the site of a former Pizza Hut. At least one Albertsons Express from the original generation of Albertson's fuel centers located in Hillsboro, Oregon, remained open in the relaunch of Albertsons Express. As of September 2021, there are exactly seven Albertsons Express across America. They are located in Idaho with three sites; and in Louisiana, Nevada, Oregon, and Texas with one site each.

==== Additional acquisitions and closures ====
On February 20, 2018, Albertsons announced plans to acquire Rite Aid, subject to shareholder and regulatory approval. In addition to retaining the stand-alone Rite Aid pharmacies, its Osco and Sav-on pharmacies located in Albertsons's existing stores were expected to be replaced by Rite Aid pharmacies. On August 8, 2018, Rite Aid announced that the plan had failed to please shareholders and the proposed acquisition would be canceled.

That same year, Albertsons closed several stores across multiple divisions, including all three Safeway stores in Florida. These stores were sold to Publix for an undisclosed price. With the closing, Albertsons officially exited the state, which it had been in since the late 1970s when they acquired their Skaggs Albertsons stores. Additionally, the company divested its share in Casa Ley, selling it to Tenedora CL del Noroeste.

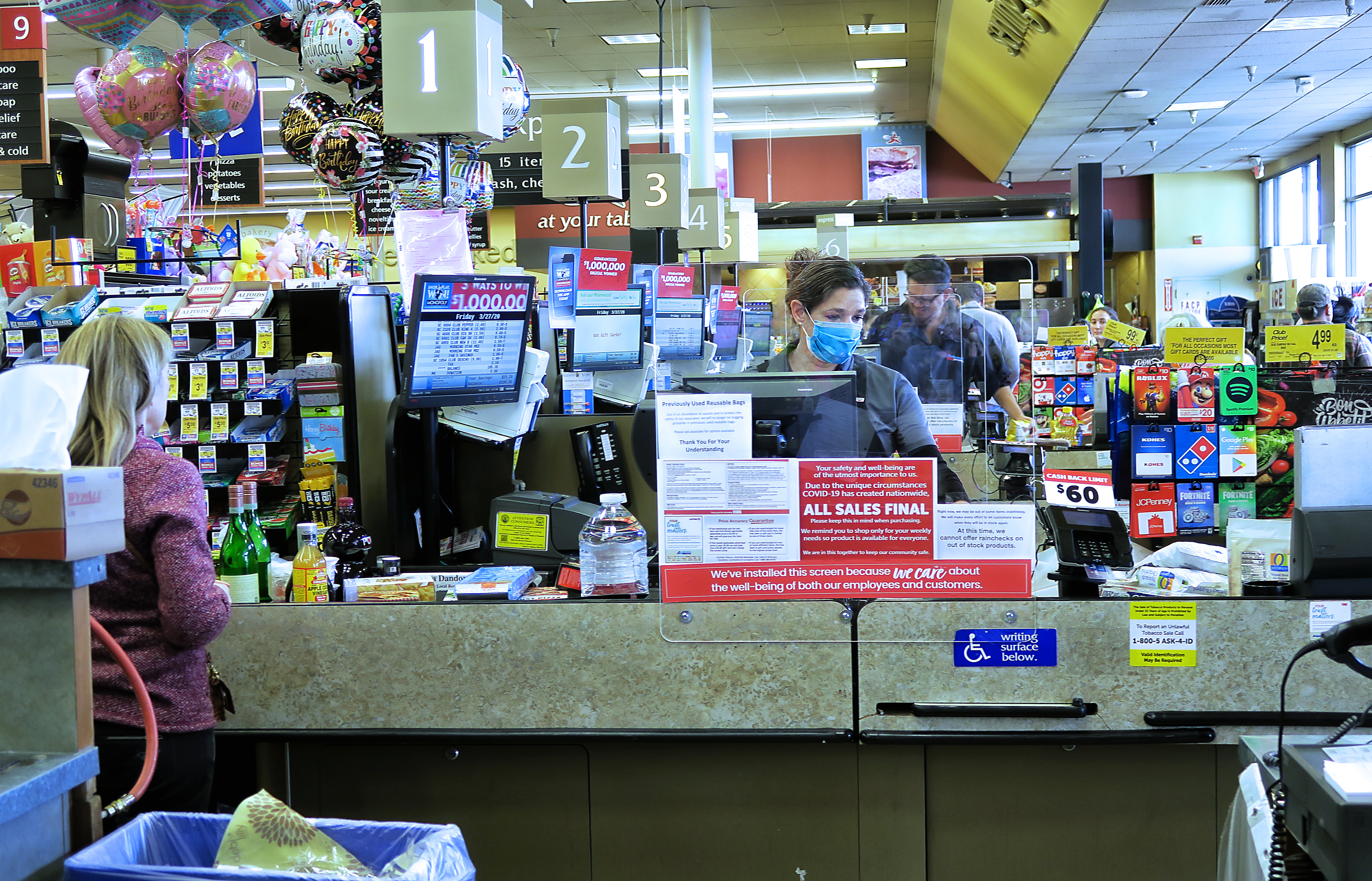
Checkouts at a Safeway during COVID-19

Also that year three new Lucky locations in Utah opened, two in West Valley City and Salt Lake City, replacing the last two Super Saver stores, and one in Tooele, replacing a former Albertsons store. The next year, a location in West Jordan, Utah, opened, replacing another Albertsons that closed in the late 2000s.

In 2019, Albertsons opened Albertsons Market Street in Meridian, Idaho, a flagship store located in a converted Shopko store and based on the Market Street brand of United Supermarkets. This became Albertsons's largest store at 110,000 square feet and featured a variety of departments exclusive to the store or found rarely in the chain, including an oyster bar, a full bar area, and in-house sausages. Additionally, around the same time, a new Andronico's Community Markets opened in Monterey, California, the first new store to be branded as such.

In 2020, Albertsons announced the closing of a distribution center in Upper Marlboro, Maryland, laying off up 520 people. Albertsons said its duties will be shifted to an existing distribution center in Lancaster, Pennsylvania, which will add up to 300 workers. Due to the COVID-19 pandemic, Albertsons's total sales experienced a growth of 27% compared to the previous year. The rise in sales and higher traffic came as a result of the COVID-19 pandemic which resulted in gross sales of $22.8 billion in the second quarter of 2020. Additionally, the company finally went public in June 2020 after years of delays. The potential IPO for the company could be valued at around $19 billion. During the time of going public, one more division change was announced when the Mid-Atlantic Division was created by combining Eastern and ACME Markets, and based out of ACME's headquarters in Malvern, Pennsylvania. In October 2020, Albertsons submitted a winning bid for the Kings Food Markets/Balducci's chain. These will be merged into the Mid-Atlantic Division.

==== Failed acquisition by Kroger ====
On October 14, 2022, Kroger announced its intent to merge with Albertsons, with Kroger acquiring all Albertsons shares and divesting some stores to secure regulatory approval. The $24.6 billion transaction was expected to close in early 2024. The announcement was met with criticism due to the potential for monopolies to form in some U.S. cities that have few other grocery chains, as well as food deserts that would form from store closures.

On November 1, 2022, Washington Attorney General Bob Ferguson filed a lawsuit in King County Superior Court against Albertsons and Kroger seeking to halt the payment of a $4 billion dividend to Albertsons shareholders. The lawsuit aims to prevent Albertsons from winding down operations and preparing store closures during regulator review of the merger. Other state attorneys general have also investigated the merger according to Reuters. In February 2024, the FTC sued to block the acquisition stating that the deal would negatively impact consumer prices and workers' wages.

In February 2024, the Federal Trade Commission and attorneys general in eight states filed a lawsuit in federal court seeking to block the acquisition on antitrust grounds. The case went to trial in August 2024 before U.S. district judge Adrienne Nelson of the U.S. District Court for the District of Oregon. In December 2024, Nelson found in favor of the FTC and issued an injunction blocking the transaction.

On December 11, 2024, Albertsons announced the termination of its merger agreement with Kroger. In response to the failed merger, Albertsons filed a lawsuit against Kroger in the Delaware Court of Chancery, alleging willful breach of contract and seeking billions of dollars in damages. The termination entitled Albertsons to an immediate $600 million termination fee and removed contractual constraints on pursuing other strategic opportunities. Following these events, Albertsons announced plans to accelerate its "Customers for Life" strategy, increase its quarterly cash dividend by 25%, and authorize a $2 billion share repurchase program.

== Chains ==
Albertsons grocery store logo

Jewel-Osco locations in purple, ACME in red, Shaw's in orange, and Albertsons in blue (1995–2007)

Albertsons operates stores under the following banners:

- Acme Markets: 162 locations (CT, DE, MD, NJ, NY and PA)
- Albertsons: 381 locations (AZ, AR, CA, CO, ID, LA, MT, NV, NM, ND, OK, OR, TX, UT, WA and WY)
- Albertsons Market: 23 locations (NM)
- Amigos: 4 locations (TX)
- Andronico's: 7 locations (CA)
- Balducci's: 8 locations (CT, MD, NY, VA)
- Carrs: 11 locations (AK)
- Haggen: 15 locations (WA)
- Jewel-Osco: 188 locations (IL, IA, and IN)
- Kings Food Markets: 19 locations (CT, NJ, NY)
- Lucky: 4 locations (UT)
- Market Street: 19 locations (NM and TX)
- Pak 'n Save: 2 locations (CA)
- Pavilions: 27 locations (Southern California)
- Randalls: 28 locations (Greater Houston and Greater Austin, TX)
- Safeway: 914 locations (AK, AZ, CA, CO, DC, DE, HI, ID, MD, MT, NE, NV, NM, OR, SD, VA, WA, WY)
- Shaw's: 127 locations (MA, ME, NH, RI and VT)
- Star Market: 21 locations (MA)
- Tom Thumb: 65 locations (Dallas–Fort Worth metroplex, TX)
- United Supermarkets: 97 locations (Texas Panhandle) plus 39 United Express locations (NM and TX)
- Vons: 194 locations (Southern California and Southern Nevada)

Former banners/chains/names:

- Buttrey Food and Drug
- Max Food and Drug/Max Foods (Connected with Econo Foods)
- Skaggs-Albertsons
- Super Saver

== Brands ==
Albertsons once owned several store brands ("private label" brands), often bearing the name of the chain sold under, e.g. "Jewel" brand products in the Jewel and Jewel-Osco locations. Other Albertsons brands over the years have included A+, Good Day, Janet Lee (named after the executive vice-president's daughter), Master's Choice, and Village Market. The drug store brands (used for health and beauty aids, over-the-counter medications, and intimate paper goods) were consolidated under the name "Equaline", rather than the previous "Sav-On Osco by Albertsons" brand. Albertsons introduced an upscale private label brand, "Essensia", in 2003, which was later renamed by SuperValu as Culinary Circle.

Store brand items in Albertsons stores included Albertsons (national brand quality food), Arctic Shores (frozen seafood), Baby Basics (diapers and infant care items), Culinary Circle ("gourmet" foods and ready-made meals), Equaline (health and beauty products), Farm Fresh (fresh produce), Flavorite (national brand quality foods, used throughout Supervalu stores), Homelife (national brand quality non-foods), Java Delight (coffee), Shoppers Value (value-priced items), Stockman & Dakota (high-quality beef), Stone Ridge (ice cream and sherbet), Super Chill (soft drinks and mixers), Whole Care Pet (pet foods and supplies), and Wild Harvest (natural and organic foods). In 2011, SuperValu announced it would eliminate Flavorite and all brands named after the chains it operates (such as Albertsons, Jewel, and Shaw's) and would replace those labels with a new label, Essential Everyday.

After its purchase of Safeway, Albertsons began replacing some of its brands with Safeway's. O Organics and Open Nature replaced Wild Harvest, Pantry Essentials replaced Shoppers Value, and Refreshe replaced Super Chill. By late 2015, the remaining store brands were replaced with "Signature" (formerly Safeway Care, Farms, Home, and Kitchens). Albertsons started selling Lucerne dairy products, Mom To Mom baby products, and Priority Pet Food as well.

Albertsons Companies line of Own Brands products launches 1,100 brand new items a year. Albertsons Companies' O Organics line is one of the nation's largest brand of USDA-certified organic products, with annual sales over $1 billion.

Some of the brands in use are:

- Signature Select - Main line of grocery products
- Debi Lilly Design - Floral and home décor products
- Lucerne Dairy Farms - Main dairy brand, used for ice cream, cheese, yogurt, and milk
- O Organics - Organic products
- Open Nature - 100% natural products
- Primo Taglio - Deli brand for meat and cheese
- Signature Cafe - Brand used for things sold at the Deli counter, soups, and refrigerated food made by the Deli and sold in the Deli Department
- Signature Care - Home and wellness products
- Signature Farms - Produce Department brand for fresh fruits and vegetables
- Signature Reserve - Premium alternative to products in the Signature Select line
- Value Corner - A cheaper alternative to products in the Signature Select/Lucerne line
- Waterfront Bistro - Frozen seafood products

== Operations ==
On average, stores in the Albertsons Companies range between 50,000 square feet (4,600 m^{2}) and 70,000 square feet (6,500 m^{2}) and almost universally feature a bakery, deli, meat counter, produce department, and seafood counter; many of the stores also feature in-store banks and pharmacies. Larger and newer stores may also offer enhanced amenities, including Starbucks coffee counters, prepared foods, in-store pizza, salad bars, and juice bars.

=== Sustainability and animal welfare ===
In 2016, Albertsons announced that it would transition to sourcing only cage-free eggs by 2025.

In 2023, Albertsons announced that it would ensure that their Own Brands packaging is 100% recyclable by 2025, and reach zero food waste to landfill by 2030 .
