= Pet Food Express =

American pet food store chain

Coordinates: 37.73929°N 122.19208°W

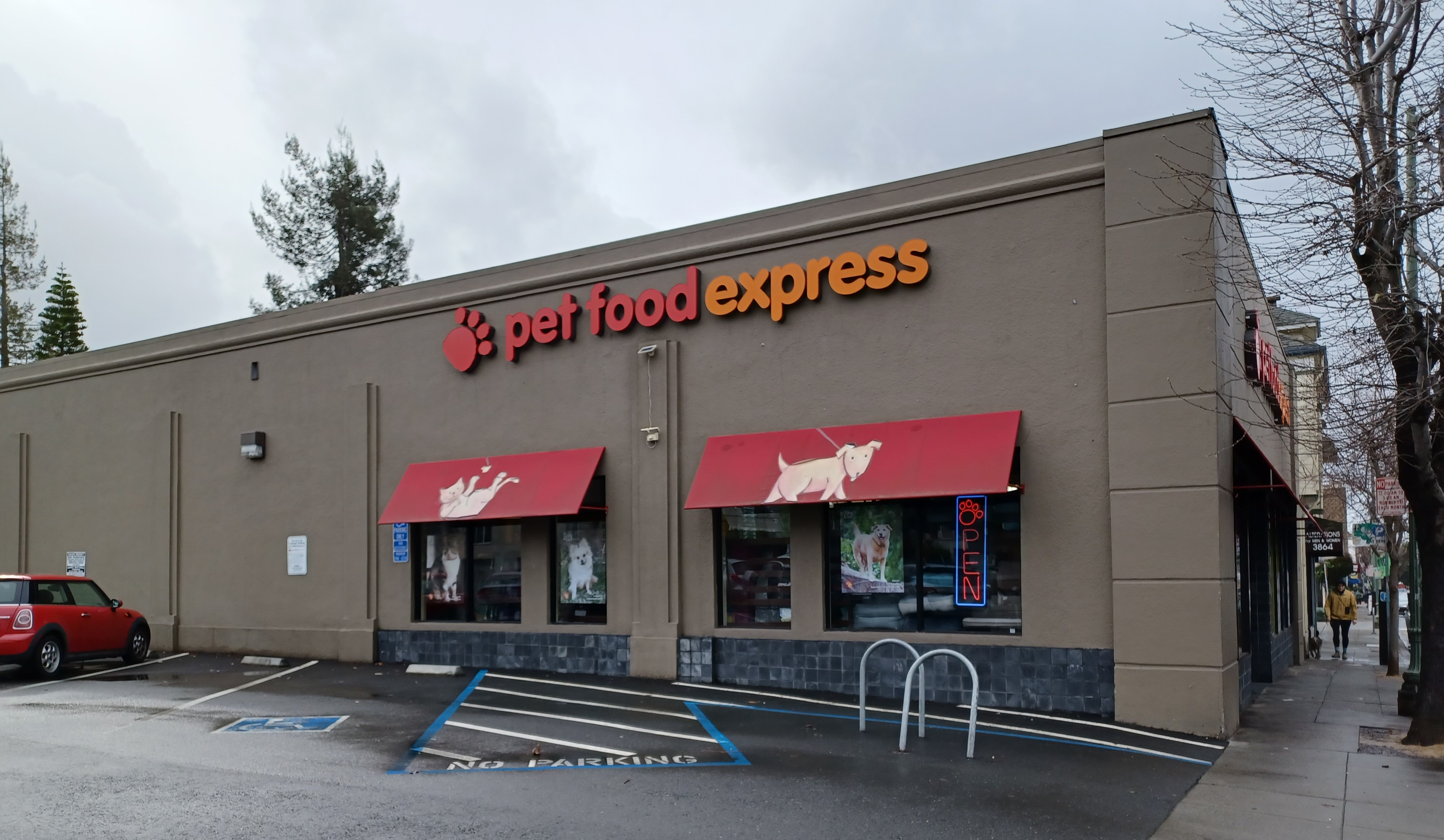
- A Pet Food Express store in Oakland
- Type: Private company
- Industry: Retail
- Genre: Pet store
- Founded: 1986
- Headquarters: 2411 Stanwell Dr; Concord, California
- Products: Pet supplies
- Owner: Rainier Partners

Pet Food Express is a California chain of retail stores that offers pet food, with a focus on premium brands, holistic, and healthy pet food, as well as other pet supplies, and self-service dog washing facilities.

Pet Food Express CEO and co-owner Michael Levy started a dog training business in 1976 and opened his first San Francisco location in 1980, selling some food and supplies. In 1987, he left dog training to focus on retail and had expanded to three locations by the time his business partner, Mark Witriol, came aboard in 1992. Pet Food Express has since expanded, and have 60 locations in Northern California, with 9 more in Southern California.

Pet Food Express partners with more than 350 non-profit animal rescue and shelter organizations, and regularly donate more than $950,000 a year to those organizations. The company set up cat adoption centers in its stores starting in 2011 and estimates that approximately 1,000 cats have been adopted through its California stores since the program's inception. Pet Food Express has a high standard of quality for its food and products.

In June 2022 the company joined with Rainier Partners, a private equity firm, to help grow the business further.
