= Ghanim Bin Saad Al Saad =

Qatari businessperson

- غانم بن سعد ال سعد
- Born: 23 August 1964 (age 62); Doha, Qatar
- Education: Kent University
- Occupation: Chairman of GSSG Holding

Ghanim Bin Saad Al Saad (Arabic: غانم بن سعد ال سعد born 23 August 1964 in Doha, Qatar) is a Qatari businessperson. He is chairman of GSSG Holding, a Qatari company.

== Education ==
Al Saad holds a BA in Social Sciences from Qatar University, as well as an MA in Social Policy & Administration from University of Kent, and a PhD in SMEs from Greenwich University, London.

== Career ==
He founded in 1993 the Ghanim Bin Saad Al Saad & Sons (GSSG) Holding.

Al Saad joined the General Assembly of Qatar Charity in 2001. He became a board member in 2001. He was appointed as chairman of the charity on 13 October 2010 and he remains the current chairman.

He was the chairman and managing director of Barwa Real Estate Company (January 2006 – April 2011), a semi-governmental real estate company 45% owned by Qatari Diar and 55% listed on the Doha Stock Exchange.

From 2008 to 2011, Al Saad was CEO and Board member of Qatari Diar. He was chairman of the Qatar Railways Company for 2010–2011. He was a member of the Qatar-Bahrain Causeway Committee.

Al Saad joined the General Assembly of Qatar Charity in 2001, and he was its Chairman from 2010 to 2013.

Al Saad ranks number 12 on the CEO Middle East Property Power List. He was featured at number 27 on the Arabian Business Qatar Power List of 2012. Al Saad has also received the title of ‘Datuk’, the Malaysian equivalent of a British peerage, from the King of Malaysia.

Al Saad is Chairman of the energy companies Oryx Group and LAMAT. Al Saad is an anchor investor in Pont Capital.
