= List of grocers =

This is a list of notable grocers. A grocer is a purveyor or bulk seller of food.

== Grocers ==
=== American ===
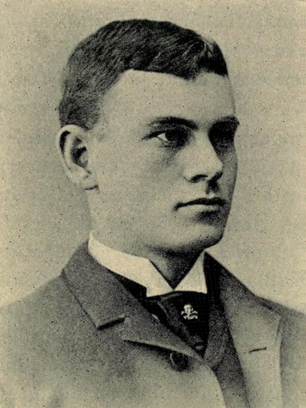
Clinton L. Hare (November 7, 1864 – June 4, 1909) was a manager, organizer, and coach of college football, and a lawyer and grocer.

- Joe Albertson
- Joseph Azzolina
- James Butler (grocer)
- Charles Butt
- Peter P. Carr
- Joe Coulombe
- Michael J. Cullen
- Joe Cury
- Bill Davila
- Demoulas Brothers
- Walter Deubener
- Reggie Dupre
- Frank Esposito (politician)
- Harvey Fitch
- Jean Fugett
- Joseph E. Grosberg
- Winfield S. Hanford
- Clinton L. Hare
- George Huntington Hartford
- George Ludlum Hartford
- John Augustine Hartford
- Steve Hodges
- George W. Jenkins
- Leo Kahn (entrepreneur)
- Edwin O. Keeler
- Bernard Kroger
- Reginald Lewis
- John Lovell (Los Angeles grocer)
- Fred G. Meyer
- Stephen P. Mugar
- Jack Muratori
- Silas Peirce
- Produce Pete
- John E. Peterson
- S.S. Pierce
- Walter Polakowski
- George Ralphs
- Clarence Saunders (grocer)
- Marion Barton Skaggs
- John C. F. Slayton
- Thomas G. Stemberg
- George W. Stockwell
- Thomas Szewczykowski
- Vivien Twidwell
- Vaccaro brothers
- Charles Von der Ahe
- Wilfred Von der Ahe
- Cas Walker
- George Butler Wason
- David Whitton (Wisconsin politician)
- Edwin Wilcox
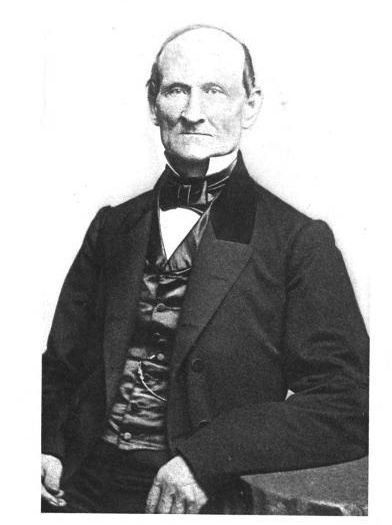
Silas Peirce was an American grocer and politician who founded the wholesale grocer Silas Peirce & Co, in Boston, Massachusetts.

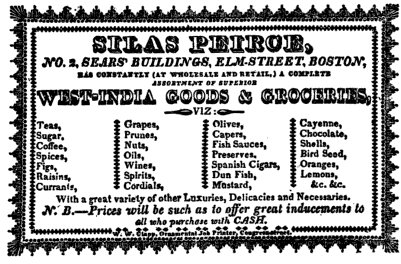
Silas Peirce's business card

=== British ===
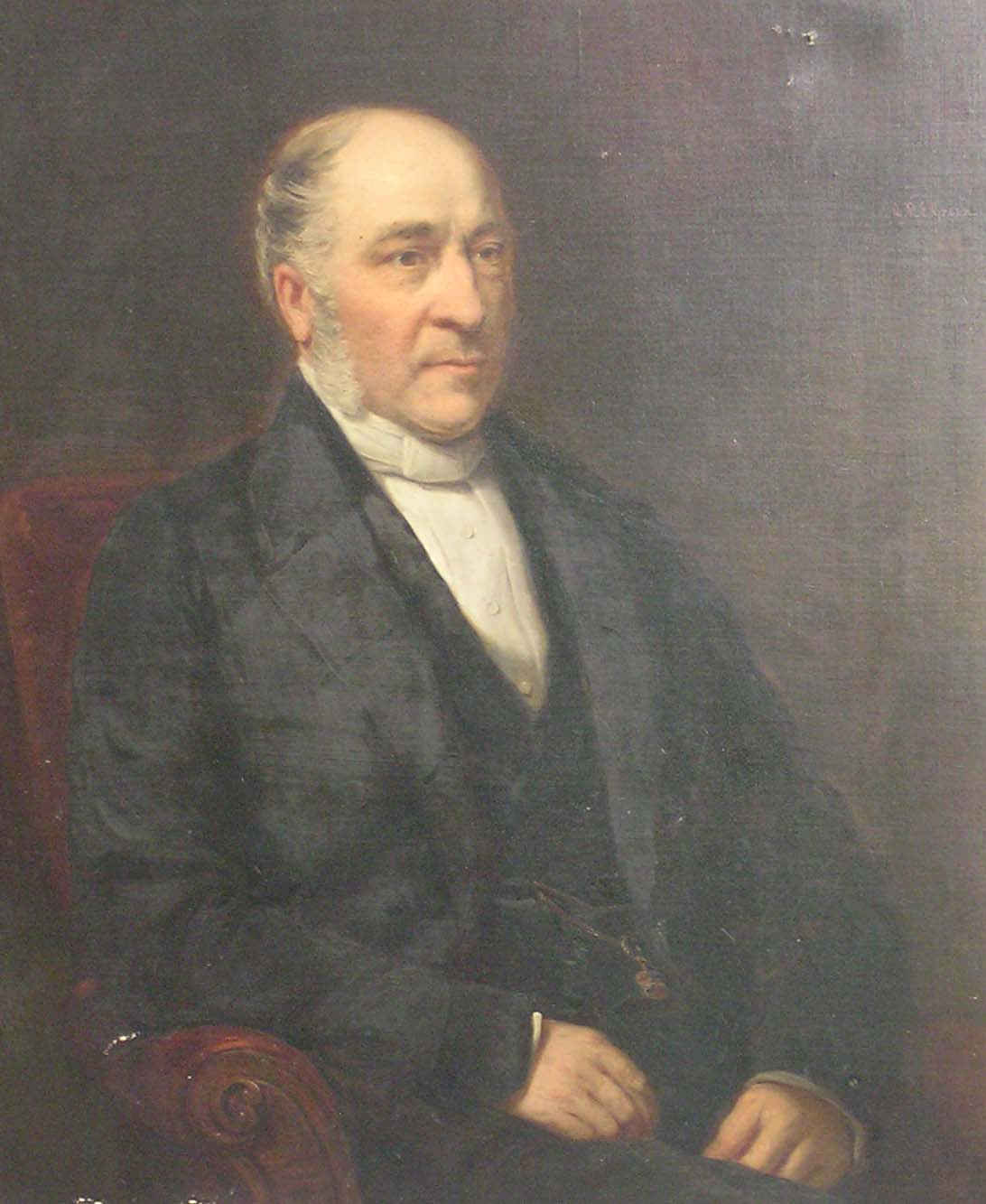
Samuel Budgett (27 July 1794 – 29 April 1851) was an English merchant who built up a wholesale grocery business called H.H. & S. Budgett, based in Kingswood Bristol.

- Samuel Budgett
- Jack Cohen (businessman)
- James Duckworth
- David atte Hacche
- Thomas Lipton
- William McKillop
- William Morrison (businessman)
- John Benjamin Sainsbury
- John James Sainsbury
- Mary Ann Sainsbury
- Lawrence Sheriff
- John "Jack" Shield
- Richard Yarward

=== Canadian ===
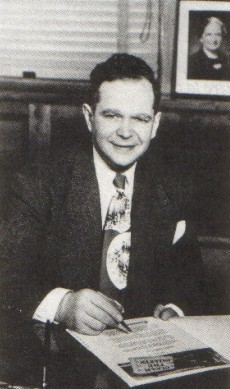
Sam Steinberg was an immigrant to Canada who transformed the grocery store founded by his mother, Steinberg's Supermarket, into one of the largest chains in the Province of Quebec.

- Henry Newell Bate
- Pete Luckett
- Emilio Picariello
- Robert Edwy Ryerson
- Frank H. Sobey
- Sam Steinberg

=== Irish ===
- Packy McGarty
- Feargal Quinn

=== Fictional ===
- Chad Vader: Day Shift Manager
- Mr. Whipple

== See also ==
- List of supermarket chains
