= Brementowne Mall =

- Location: Tinley Park, Illinois
- Coordinates: 41°36′01.51″N 87°47′14.87″W
- Address: 159th & Oak Park Ave, Tinley Park
- Opened: November 15, 1973; 52 years ago
- Closed: 1994; 32 years ago
- Developer: Jack Jacobs & Company
- Architect: Envirotechnics Ltd.
- Num. of anchor tenants: 0 (3 at peak)
- Floor area: 375,000 sq ft (34,800 m^{2})
- Floors: 1 (2 in Gately's)

Brementowne Mall was a enclosed shopping mall in Tinley Park, Illinois. It opened in 1973 and was redeveloped in 1994. The interior portion of the mall was redeveloped into Menards and the Amish Furniture Shoppe.

== History ==
=== Early Years ===
Ground was broken for the Brementowne Mall in 1972. Brementowne Mall was developed by the Jack Jacobs & Company; it was to include 2 main anchor stores.

Brementowne Mall had its official grand opening on November 15, 1973. The mall opened with 20 stores with Dominick's and Walgreen's as day 1 anchors.

Gately's Opened a 120,000 sq ft (11,000 m^{2}) store as a second anchor in May of 1975.

=== Redevelopment ===
Menards opened their store in the mall's interior and former Gately's space on April 17, 1994. The Dominick's space was redeveloped into the Amish Furniture Shoppe.
