= Bob Mariano =

Bob Mariano may refer to:

- Bob Mariano (baseball), American baseball scout, coach and manager
- Bob Mariano (executive), American businessman, CEO and chairman of supermarket chain Roundy's
- Rob Mariano, American television personality
