= Shopping bag (disambiguation) =

A shopping bag is used to carry items home following their purchase.

Shopping bag can also refer to:

- Shopping Bag, the Partridge Family musical album
- "Shopping Bags (She Got from You)", a 2004 song by De La Soul
- Fazio's Shopping Bag, a defunct chain of supermarkets
