= Von der Ahe =

Origin
- Origin: German
- Meaning: from the Ahe (either a place or a river)
- Region of origin: Germany, Netherlands

Other names
- Variant form: Van der Ahe

von der Ahe is a locational surname of German origin, which means a person who lived by a creek, derived from ahe, "running water", "stream". An alternative, related meaning is "from the Ahe", where there are several rivers and towns named Ahe in Germany. The name may refer to:

- Charles Von der Ahe (1882–1973), American businessman, founder of Vons supermarket chain
- Chris von der Ahe (1851–1913), American businessman, baseball team owner in St. Louis
- Fred Vonder Ahe (1828–1905), German pioneer of Oregon
- Jess von der Ahe (born 1966), American artist
- Wilfred Von der Ahe (1910–1998), American businessman, son of Charles

== See also ==
- Ahe
