= People's store =

People's store may refer to:

- Peoples (store), a defunct chain of department stores based in Tacoma, Washington
- A. Hamburger & Sons, store originally known as "The People’s Store"
- Gately's People's Store, a department store in Chicago
