= Gelson's Markets =

Southern California-based supermarket chain

Gelson's Markets, Inc.

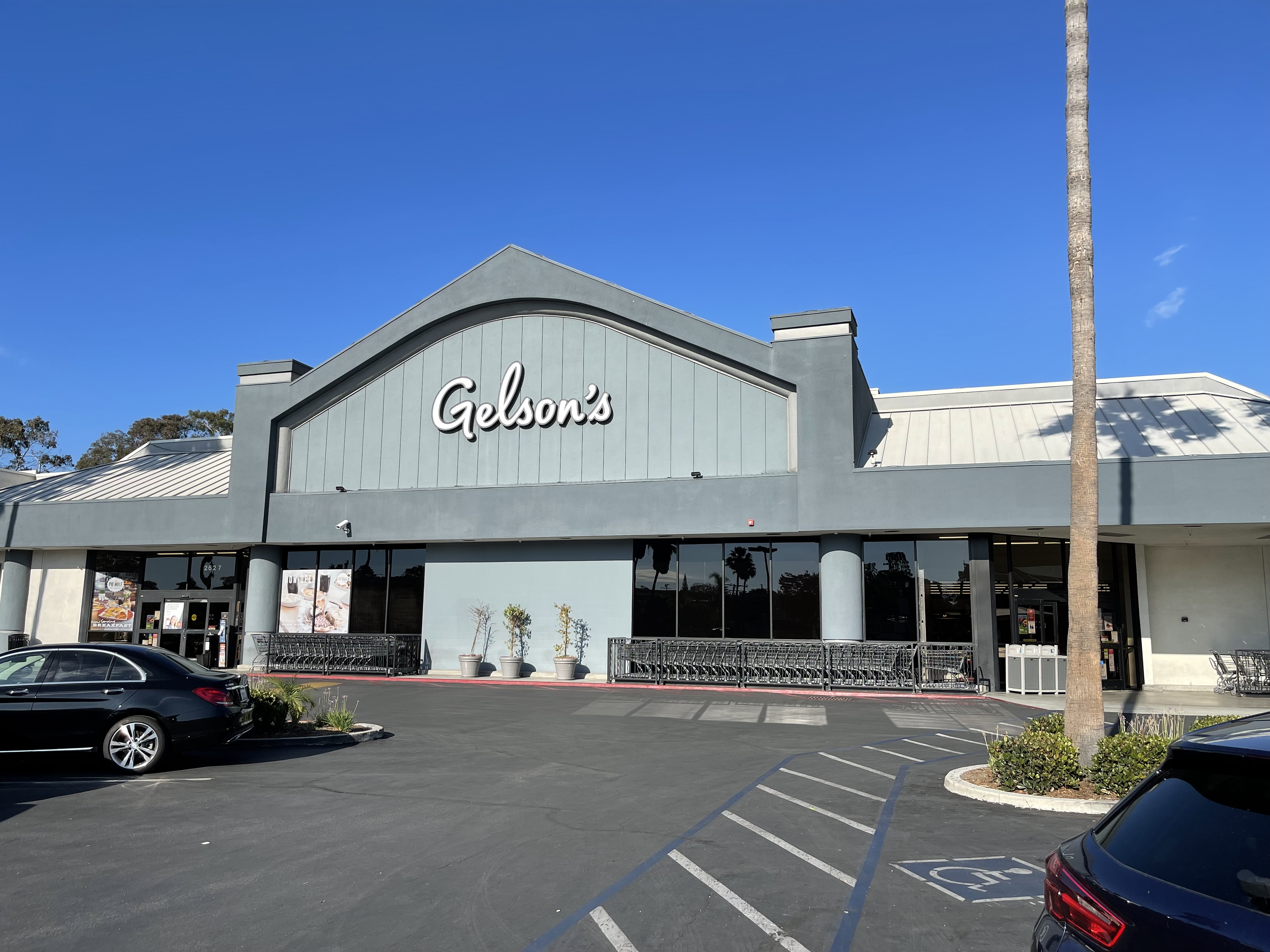
- Exterior of the company's Santa Monica, California location.
- Type: Private
- Industry: Retail (Grocery)
- Founded: July 1951 (75 years ago) in Burbank, California, U.S.
- Founders: Bernard Gelson; Eugene Gelson
- Headquarters: Encino, California, U.S.
- Number of locations: 27 (2025)
- Area served: Southern California
- Key people: Bob Mariano (Director); Koichi Toyo (President/CEO)
- Products: Bakery, delicatessen, dairy, grocery, frozen foods, organic foods, bulk foods, meat, produce, seafood, wine, beer, spirits, floral products, pet supplies, general merchandise, prepared foods, coffee
- Services: Pharmacy, Catering
- Revenue: ▲$637 million (2021)
- Owner: PPIH
- Number of employees: 3,000 (2021)
- Website: gelsons.com

Gelson's is an American regional supermarket chain operating in Southern California. It operates service-oriented stores mostly in upscale neighborhoods.

== History ==
According to the chain's website, the chain originated in July 1951, with the first store in Burbank, California, opening on that date. The name Gelson's came from the two founding brothers, Bernard and Eugene Gelson. The second store opened in 1960 in Encino and the third store opened in 1965 in North Hollywood.

In 1966, Arden Group acquired Gelson's. Arden Group originated around the 1929 stock market crash. In 1948, Arden Farms Company merged Mayfair Markets and 48 California Van Markets into a new chain called "Mayfair Markets." By the mid-1960s, it had expanded to neighboring states with over 250 stores. However, as larger supermarkets gained popularity, most of these stores were sold off. Eventually, upscale Mayfair stores were renovated and became Gelson's branches. After the sale, Gelson's operated as an independent subsidiary of Arden Group, with Bernard and Eugene continuing to work for the chain. Bernard retired in 1988, while Eugene worked there until his death in 1980.

== Post-Arden expansion ==
Gelson's opened their fifth market in Tarzana in 1967. A Century City store existed in 1977.

In February 2014, Arden Group sold Gelson's to TPG Capital for $394 million.

In 2015, the company acquired 8 stores from Haggen for $36 million.

In November 2017, Bob Mariano joined the board of directors of the company.

In February 2021, Gelson's Markets was acquired by Pan Pacific International Holdings (PPIH), the parent company of Japanese retailers Don Quijote and Marukai Corporation.
