= AHE =

AHE or Ahe may refer to:

== Language ==
- Ahe language (ISO-639-3 code), a Land Dayak language (or dialect of Kendayan)
- Alternate name of the Native American Gros Ventre language
- Age, in Inari Sami
- Ahe (アヘ), a Japanese onomatopoeia describing a female's flushed breath/moan and sexual excitement, used in ahegao ("weird face")

== Other uses ==
- Ahe, an atoll in the Tuamotu Archipelago
- Ahe Airport (IATA code AHE)
- Adaptive histogram equalization
- Ahepe (House of the Ahe), village near Togo, Africa
- Alberta Hospital Edmonton, Canada
- Association for the Healthcare Environment, American Hospital Association membership group
- Austro-Hungarian Empire, a historical empire in Eastern Europe

== See also ==
- Ahes, a Breton magician and princess
- AH (disambiguation)
- Von der Ahe (surname)
