= Crystal Point Mall =

Shopping mall in Crystal Lake, Illinois

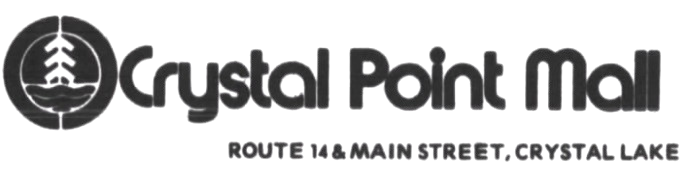
- Location: Crystal Lake, Illinois, US
- Coordinates: 42.2276946°N 88.3127799°W
- Address: 6000 Northwest Hwy, Crystal Lake, IL 60014
- Opened: March 25, 1976
- Renovated: 1999
- Closed: 1998 (original indoor mall)
- Developer: Jack Jacobs Co.
- Manager: McHenry County
- Owner: McHenry County
- Architect: Jack Jacobs
- Num. of stores: 42
- Num. of anchor tenants: 3
- Floor area: 370,000 square feet (34,000 m^{2})
- Floors: 1

Crystal Point Mall was a shopping mall located in Crystal Lake, Illinois that opened in 1976, and closed in 1998. It was subdivided with stores after its closure.

== History ==
Crystal Point Mall opened on March 25, 1975, with the Joseph Spiess Company (out of Elgin), a Robert Hall Village Discount Store, and a Dominick's Grocery Store. It included 50 stores at its opening. It was also the only mall in McHenry County.

In 1977 the Robert Hall Village Discount Store would close later becoming a Kmart. In May, 1978 a renovation was done that added 7 additional stores to the mall. This is also when the Kmart moved into the mall.

In the 1990s, the mall started to decline with Joseph Spiess closing in 1996 and Dominick's relocating in 1999.

In 1999, the site was redeveloped into 9 stores and a restaurant which included Bed Bath & Beyond, Best Buy, Borders Books, Office Depot, Sports Authority, Kmart and Walgreens.
