= Vons =

American supermarket chain owned by Albertsons Companies, Inc

The Vons Companies, Inc.

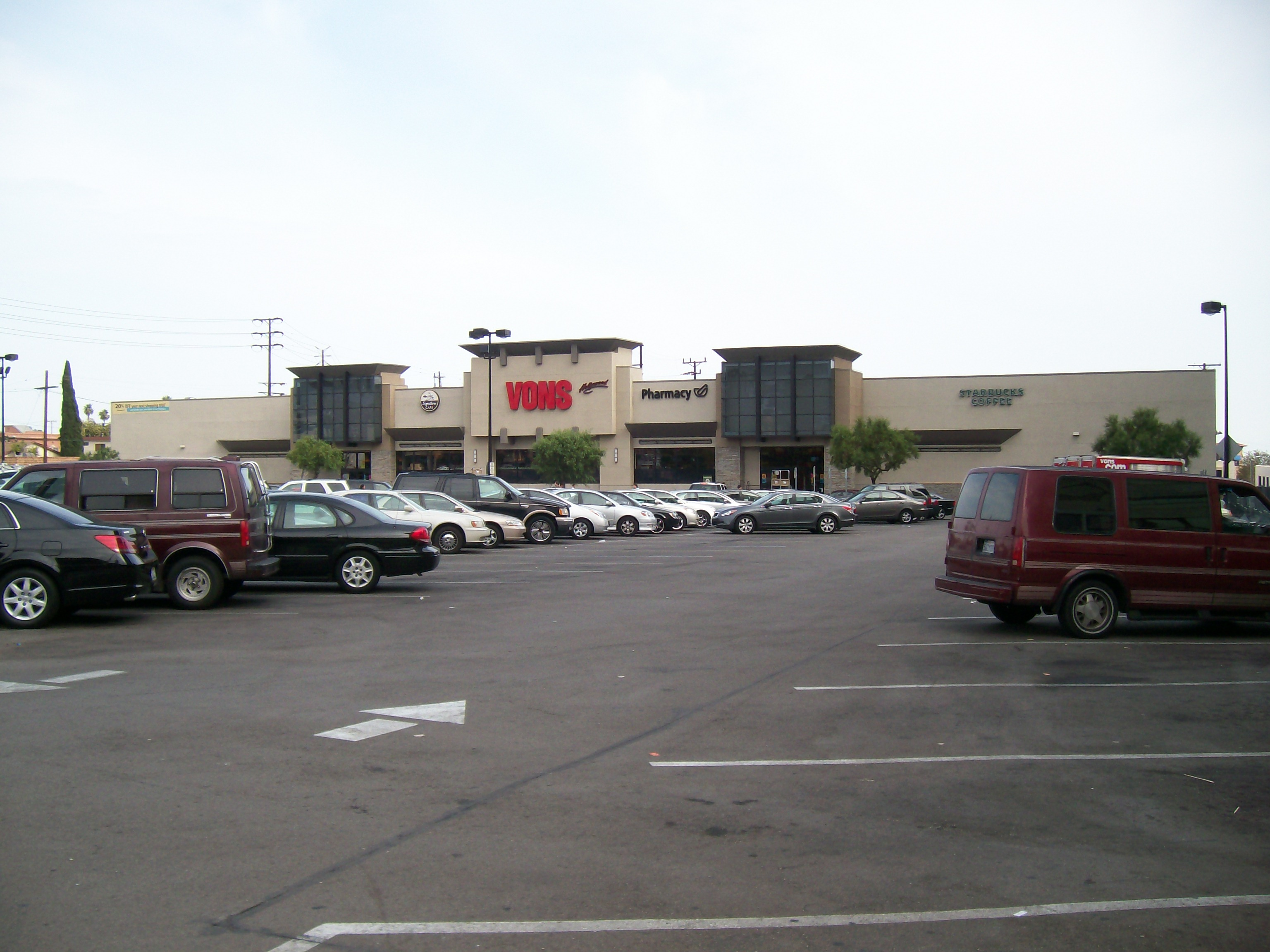
- Exterior of the Vons store in Hollywood, Los Angeles, California.
- Formerly: Von's Groceteria (1906–1928); Von's Grocery Company. (1932–1970)
- Type: Subsidiary
- Industry: Retail / grocery
- Founded: 1906 (120 years ago) in Los Angeles, California
- Founder: Charles Von der Ahe
- Headquarters: Fullerton, California, U.S.
- Number of locations: 191
- Area served: California; Nevada
- Key people: Beyo Michel (chairman, CEO) B. Kevin Turner (vice chairman); Bob Gordon (EVP and general counsel)
- Products: Bakery, dairy, deli, frozen foods, general grocery, meat, pharmacy, produce, seafood, snacks, liquor, floral
- Services: Supermarket
- Revenue: US$2.6 billion
- Number of employees: ▲44,000 (2021)
- Parent: Household Finance Corporation (1969–1986); Safeway (1997–2015); Albertsons (2015–present)
- Divisions: Pavilions
- Website: vons.com

The Vons Companies, Inc. is a supermarket chain owned by Albertsons, with most of its locations in Southern California and the Las Vegas Valley. It is headquartered in Fullerton, California, and operates stores under the Vons and Pavilions banners. It was owned by Safeway Inc. and headquartered in Arcadia, California, before that company was acquired by and folded into Albertsons along with all of their subsidiaries, including Vons.

== History ==
=== Beginning ===
Charles Von der Ahe opened a 20-foot wide store named Von's Groceteria in downtown Los Angeles, California, in 1906. The business had grown to 87 stores by 1928, when he sold the operation to MacMarr Stores. MacMarr was acquired by M.B. Skaggs' Safeway in 1930. In 1932, Von der Ahe's sons Theodore and Wilfred Von der Ahe restarted the Von's Grocery Company.

In 1948, Von's opened a pioneering store which offered self-service, pre-packaged produce, meat, and deli items. By 1958, it had doubled in size to 27 stores, the third-largest grocery chain in the Greater Los Angeles area. In 1960 it acquired the sixth-largest, competitor Shopping Bag, a merger that was challenged by the Federal Trade Commission on antitrust grounds. In 1966 the United States Supreme Court ruled against Von's in United States v. Von's Grocery Co. (384 U.S. 270), forcing a re-divestiture of the stores, which were eventually sold to Fisher Foods. The Von der Ahe family sold the chain to Household Finance Corporation in 1969. In 1970, Vons had 128 stores, making it the second largest supermarket chain in southern California behind Safeway. In 1972, Vons acquired DeFalco's Food Giant, a San Diego supermarket chain.

=== 1980s–present ===
In 1984, Vons was named official supermarket of the 1984 Summer Olympics.

In 1985, William Davila was named president and CEO of Vons, the first Mexican American to be CEO of an American supermarket chain. Prior to his appointment, Davila worked for 37 years at Vons before becoming CEO. He opened Tianguis in 1986, catering to Hispanic consumers, and was well received as the company's television spokesman, starring in commercials in both English and Spanish during his tenure. He retired in 1999.

In 1986, Household spun off Vons Companies in a leveraged buyout. To recapitalize itself, Vons merged with Detroit, Michigan-based Allied Supermarkets and sold off its assets outside California. Vons was listed on the New York Stock Exchange in 1987.

In 1986, Safeway sold all of its stores in southern California and southern Nevada to Vons in exchange for an ownership stake. On April 8, 1997, Safeway acquired Vons for stock and Vons became a subsidiary of Safeway.

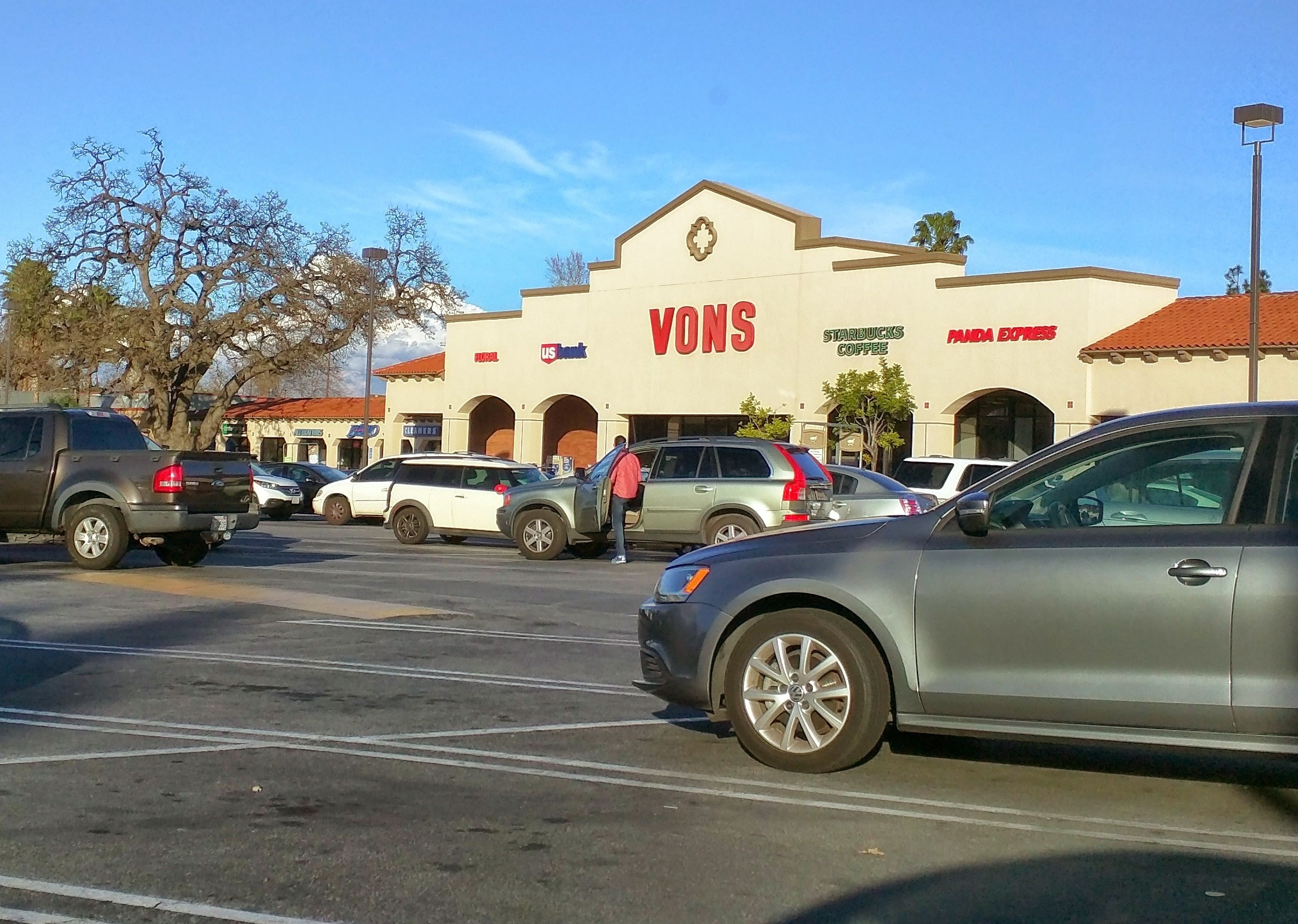
Vons store (Woodland Hills, CA) before closing and reopening late 2015 as Haggen, then shutting down and reopening in 2017 as Bristol Farms

In March 2014, Cerberus Capital Management (which also owns rival grocery chain Albertsons) agreed to terms to purchase Vons' parent, Safeway. Cerberus' plans to merge the chains resulted in store closures, since both Vons and Albertsons had (and still have) a significant presence in Southern California; in late 2014, the FTC mandated that the new Albertsons/Safeway merger sell off almost 200 stores to allow for sufficient competition in markets where both Safeway and Albertsons stores had existed in price rivalry. One of the key buyers was Bellingham, Washington-based Haggen grocers which rebranded the newly purchased stores in Washington, Oregon, California, Arizona, and Nevada in early 2015 only to sell back the affected stores just months later after Haggen was forced into bankruptcy as a result of purchasing the new stores. Haggen was soon after acquired by Albertsons.

=== Pavilions (supermarket) ===
Pavilions
- Type: Subsidiary
- Industry: Retail (food and grocery retail)
- Founded: October 1985 (41 years ago) in Garden Grove, California
- Number of locations: 26
- Area served: Southern California
- Products: Bakery, dairy, deli, frozen foods, general grocery, meat, pharmacy, produce, seafood, snacks, liquor, floral, Wells Fargo, dry cleaning, fuel
- Parent: Vons (1985–1997); Safeway Inc. (1997–2015); Albertsons (through Vons) (2015–present)
- Website: pavilions.com

In October 1985, Vons introduced Pavilions, a "combination store" concept which offered a wider variety of upscale products as well as pharmacy and other non-food products and services. Although similar to Vons stores, Pavilions markets are more upscale and feature a larger selection of organic food, wine, and other specialty foods. Some stores that were smaller were branded Pavilions Place.

The stores also tend to be larger than the typical Vons store, because many of them contain full-service pharmacies, expanded service areas and specialty offerings as a standard feature.

The first location was opened in Garden Grove in October 1985 in a 55,000-square-foot former Zody's discount department store building. The new store included a seafood shop that sold live fish, a full-service butcher shop, bakery, tortilla shop, small pizza parlor, ice cream shop, delicatessen, florist, and pharmacy.

== Lifestyle branding ==
On April 18, 2005, Safeway began a $100 million brand re-positioning campaign labeled "Ingredients for life." This was done in an attempt to differentiate itself from its competitors, and to increase brand involvement. Steve Burd described it as "branding the shopping experience."

The launch included a redesigned logo, a new slogan "Ingredients for life" alongside a four-panel life icon to be used throughout stores and advertising, and a web application called "FoodFlex" to improve consumer nutrition. Many locations are being converted to the "Lifestyle" format. The new look was designed by Michigan-based PPC Design. In addition to the "inviting decor with warm ambiance and subdued lighting," the move required heavy redesign of store layout, new employee uniforms, sushi and olive bars, and the addition of in-store Starbucks kiosks (with cupholders on grocery carts). The change also involved differentiating the company from competitors with promotions based on the company's extensive loyalty card database. At the end of 2004, there were 142 "Lifestyle" format stores in the United States and Canada, with plans to open or remodel another 300 stores with this type of theme the following year. "Lifestyle format" stores have seen significantly higher average weekly sales than their other stores. By the end of 2006, shares were up proving that this rebranding campaign had a major impact on sales figures.

== Slogans ==
- "Vons is the More Store" (mid-80s to early 90s)
- Vons is Value (mid-to-late 1990s)
- Giving Our Best (late 1990s-2005)
- Ingredients for life (2005–2015)
- It's Just Better (2015–2017)
- Sincerely, Food (2023-present)

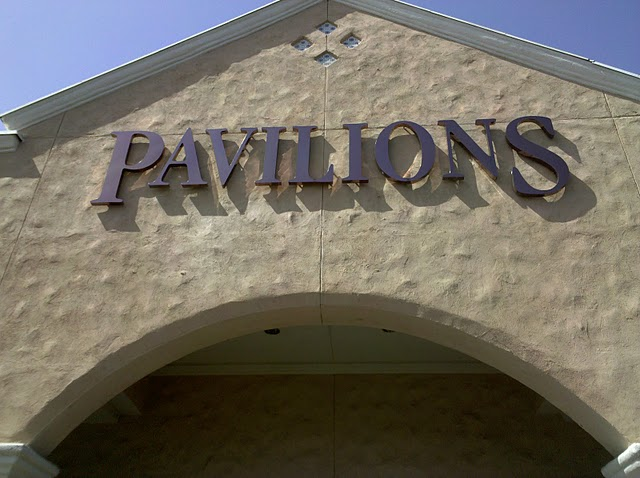
A Pavilions location in Anaheim Hills in March, 2010 (Store #2216). This was converted into a Vons in September 2020.
