= Mariano's =

Midwestern supermarket chain

Mariano’s

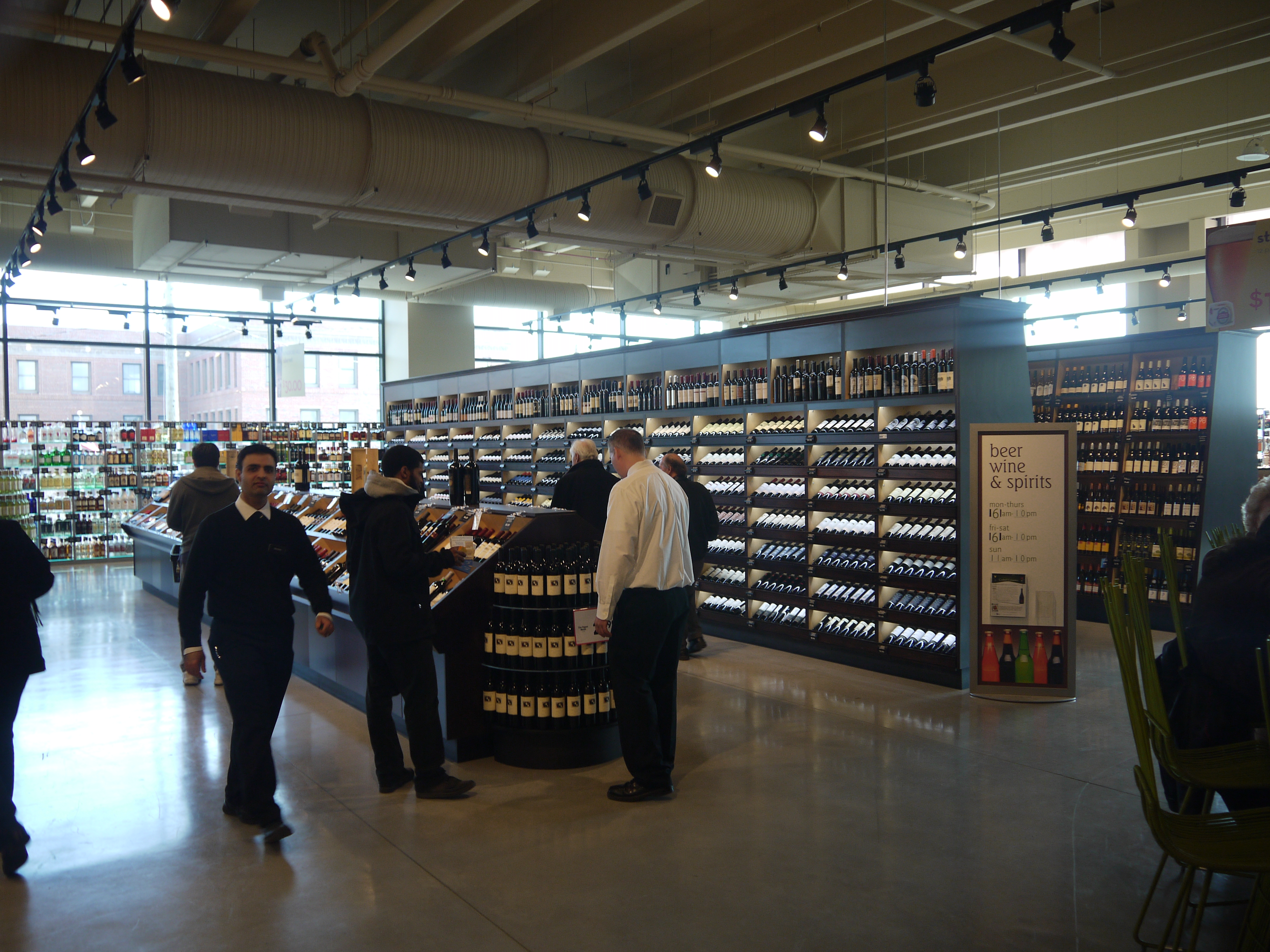
- Inside a Mariano's store (Store #531-00515 in Ravenswood, Chicago)
- Type: Subsidiary
- Industry: Grocery store
- Founded: July 2010; 16 years ago in Arlington Heights, Illinois, United States
- Founder: Robert Mariano
- Owner: Kroger
- Parent: Roundy's
- Website: marianos.com

Mariano's is an American supermarket chain in the Chicago metropolitan area founded in 2010. Mariano's is owned by Roundy's, itself a subsidiary of Kroger.

== First location ==
The first Mariano's opened in 2010 in Arlington Heights, Illinois. The building has 60,000 ft^{2} (5,600 m^{2}) of retail space.

== Departments ==
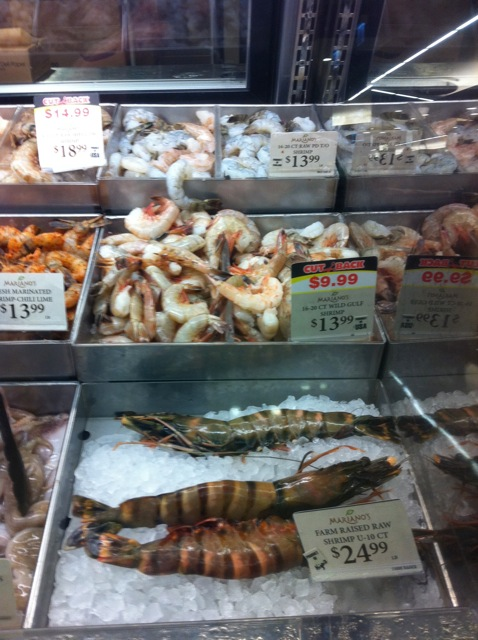
Shrimp for sale in 2011

Departments in the store sell a range of food and drink including coffee and gelato, sushi, rotisserie chickens, smoked ribs, briskets, and sliders, salad bar buffet, oyster and liquor bar, cheese, sweets, juice and smoothies.
