= Roundy's =

American supermarket chain

Roundy's Supermarkets, Inc.
- Trade name: Roundy's
- Formerly: Smith, Roundy & Co. (1872–1970)
- Type: Subsidiary
- Industry: Retail (Grocery)
- Founded: 1872 (154 years ago)
- Founders: William E. Smith; Judson Roundy; Sidney Hauxhurst
- Headquarters: Milwaukee, Wisconsin
- Number of locations: 151
- Area served: Wisconsin and Illinois
- Products: Bakery, dairy, deli, frozen foods, general grocery, meat, pharmacy, produce, seafood, snacks
- Revenue: US$ 3.5 billion (2021)
- Number of employees: 14,000 (2021)
- Parent: Kroger
- Divisions: Pick 'n Save; Metro Market; Mariano's Fresh Market; Copps Food Centers (Until 2017)
- Website: www.roundys.com

Roundy's Supermarkets, Inc. is an American supermarket operator. It owns and operates stores under the names of Pick 'n Save, Metro Market, and Mariano's Fresh Market. The chain is a subsidiary of Kroger. Roundy's operates 149 supermarkets and 107 pharmacies throughout the states of Wisconsin and Illinois. Based on fiscal year 2012 sales, Roundy's was the 37th largest grocery store chain and the 89th largest retailer in the United States. As of December 2015, Roundy's became a subsidiary of Kroger of Cincinnati, Ohio.

Roundy's is known historically as a wholesale supplier to independent retailers. It operates food production facilities in Kenosha and other locations and has two main distribution centers in Mazomanie and Oconomowoc, Wisconsin.

The company began trading on the New York Stock Exchange on February 8, 2012, and ceased trading on December 18, 2015, when it became a subsidiary of Kroger.

== History ==
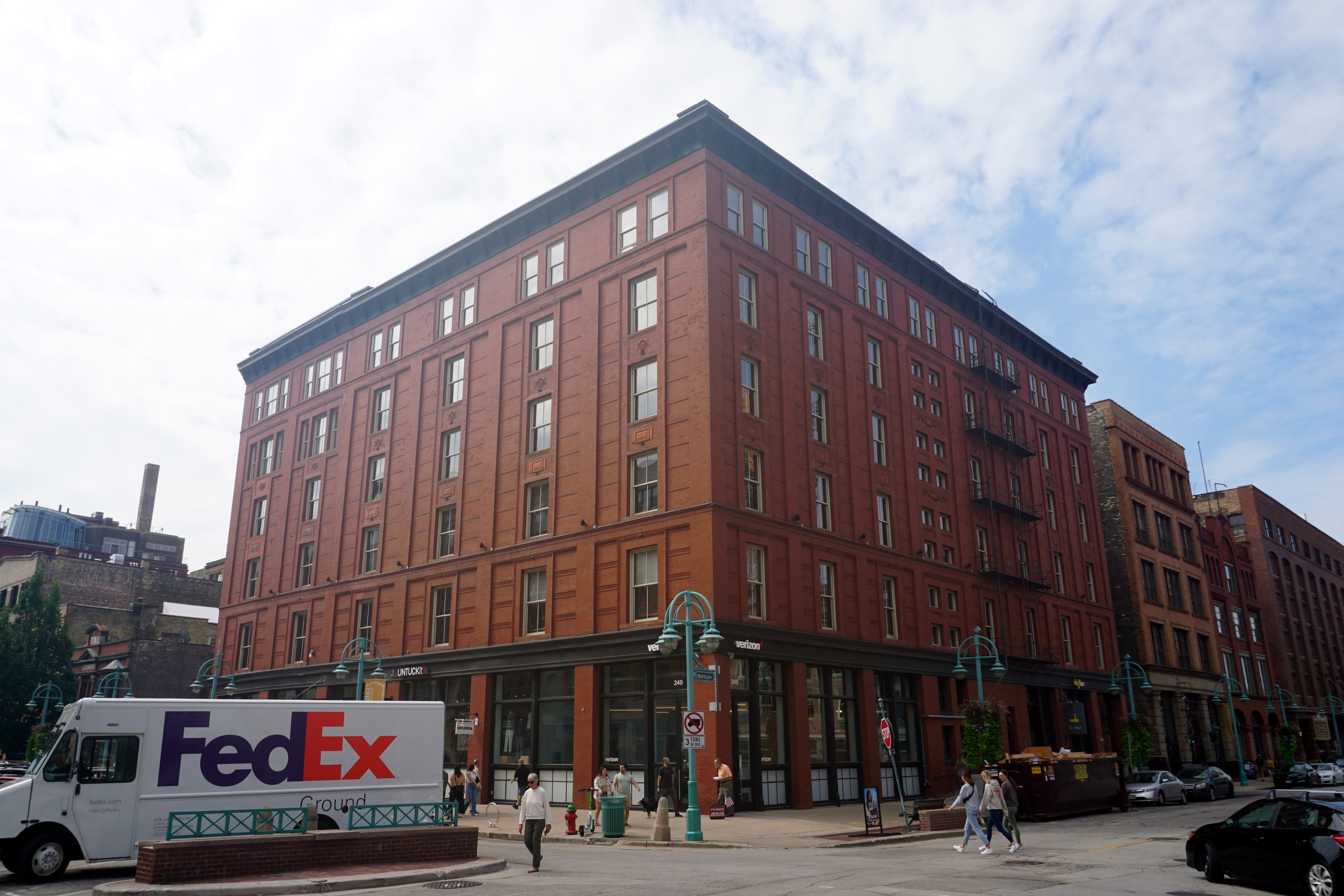
Roundy, Peckham & Dexter Company building in Milwaukee's Historic Third Ward

The company was founded in 1872 in Milwaukee as Smith, Roundy & Co. by William E. Smith, Judson Roundy and Sidney Hauxhurst. In 1942, the company purchased Clark & Host coffee roasting company from Charles Clark.

Roundy's was a major warehouse distributor to non-company supermarkets, including IGA, but it moved out of the wholesale market to focus on retail.

Roundy's was taken private in 2002 through purchase by the Chicago private-equity firm Willis Stein & Partners.

Roundy's took the company public via an initial public offering (IPO) in 2012, posting an initial share price of $8.50 per share.

Beginning in 2002, the CEO of the corporation was Robert "Chairman Bob" Mariano, who had been the CEO of Dominick's prior to Dominick's sale to Safeway in 1998.

On December 2, 2013, Roundy's and Mariano announced it would purchase 11 Dominick's stores to rebrand them as Mariano's, after Safeway finished closing the chain early in 2014.

On November 11, 2015, Roundy's announced its sale to Kroger, a deal valued at $800 million including debt, which was completed on December 18, 2015. Following completion of the sale, Roundy's retained its headquarters in Milwaukee. It was suggested that Kroger primarily was interested in the Mariano's division, which allowed Kroger to enter the Chicago market for the first time. Underlining this, Kroger normally doesn’t acquire chains in financial difficulty; the Roundy's divisions in Wisconsin had been, and continue to be, in decline.

The sale of Roundy's to Cincinnati-based Kroger, about two years after Safeway shut down its Chicago-based Dominick's supermarket chain, selling many of the stores to other operators, was a matter discussed in the regional business press.

CEO Bob Mariano retired on September 1, 2016.

== Banners and brands ==
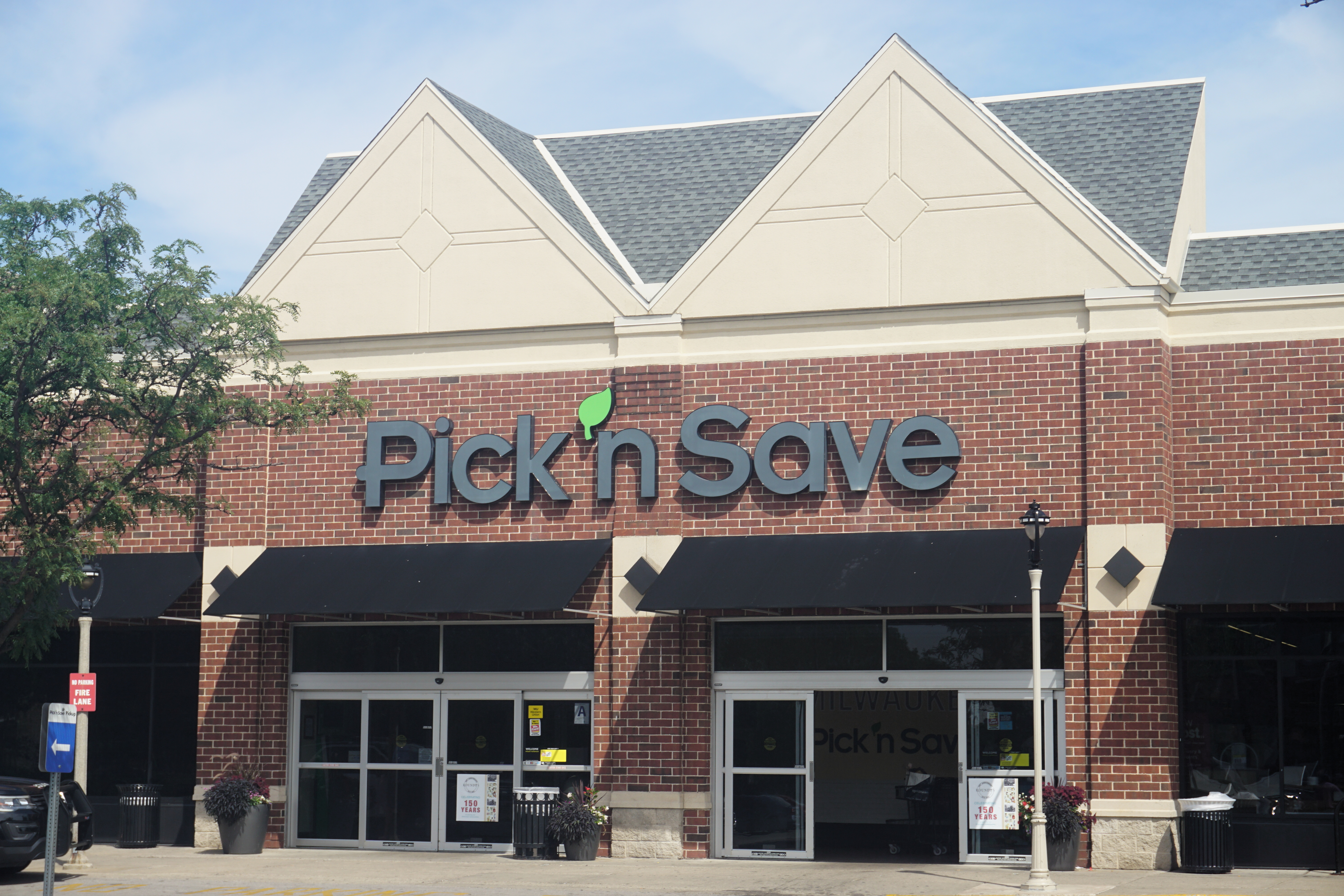
A Pick 'n Save in Milwaukee

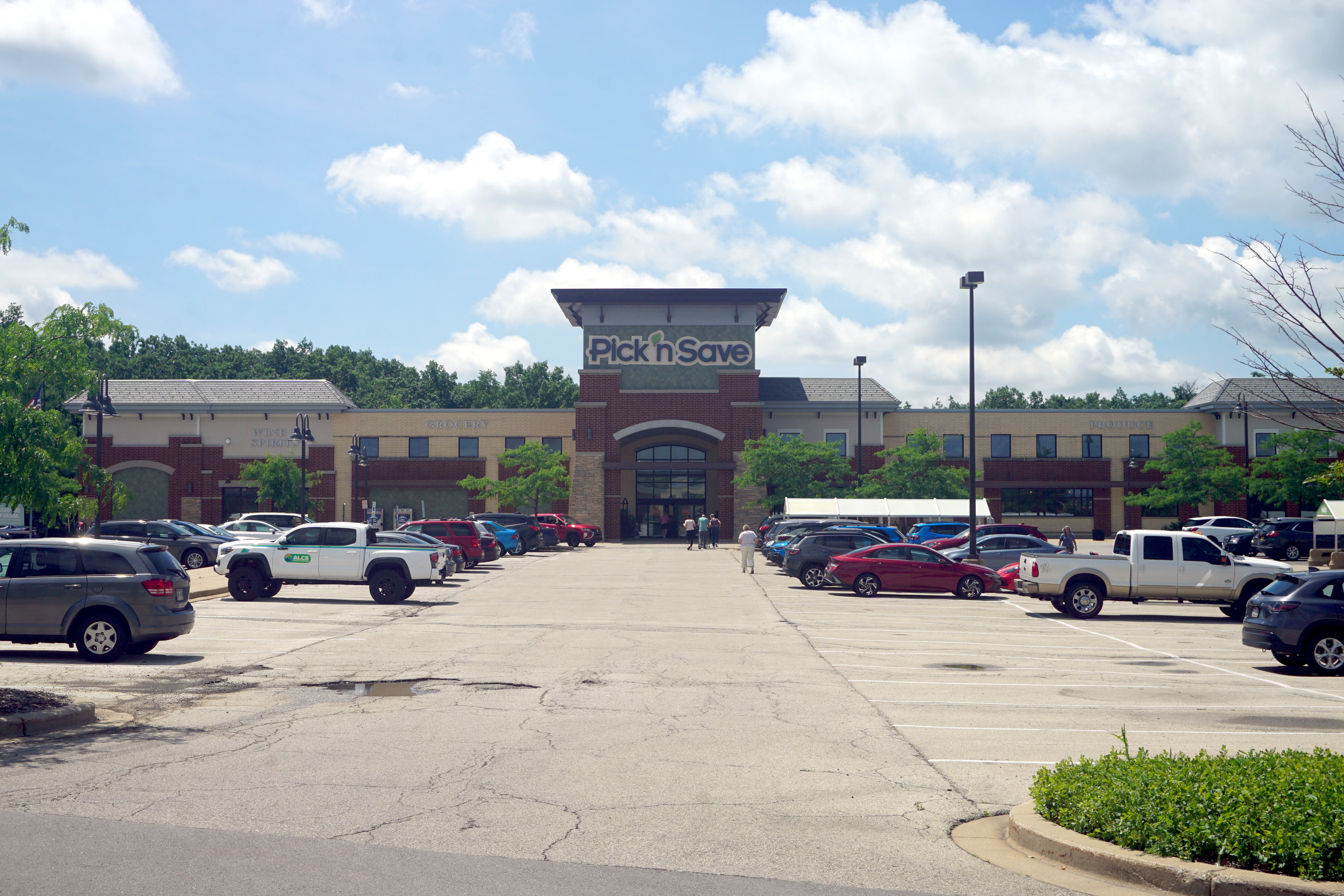
A Pick 'n Save in Franklin, Wisconsin

A Metro Market in Shorewood, Wisconsin

Roundy's includes three front-facing brands and one former brand while Roundy's is used mainly as a private label brand.

- Pick 'n Save stores are warehouse food store concept in 1975, but over time with the decline of former competitor Kohl's Food Stores under its A&P ownership and major changes to Piggly Wiggly, now operates as a traditional supermarket chain.
- Metro Market, a smaller-store concept, launched in 2004, prevalent in the Milwaukee and Madison markets, mainly competing with Sendik's, Trader Joe's and Whole Foods Market.
- Mariano's Fresh Market, the same concept as Metro Market in the Chicago market; named for former Roundy's CEO "Chairman" Bob Mariano. Mariano's was launched in 2010.
- Copps Food Centers was acquired by Roundy's in 2001. Several attempts were made to convert those stores to the Pick 'n Save name under Roundy's ownership, which were generally unsuccessful and scattered due to customer sentiment against the rebranding. Kroger finally completed the rebranding of Copps locations to Pick 'n Save in 2017.
