= Fisher Foods =

Defunct American supermarket chain

Fisher Foods, Inc.
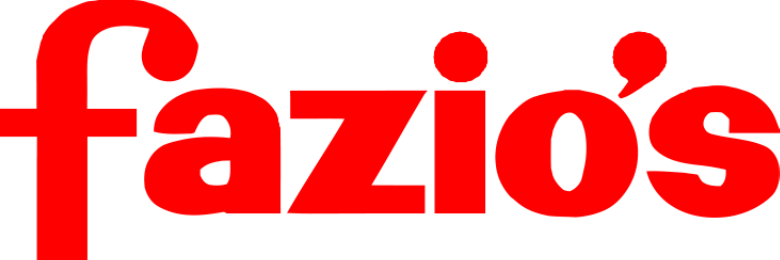
- Industry: Retail
- Founded: 1907 (Cleveland, Ohio)
- Founder: Manning and Charles Fisher
- Defunct: 1997
- Fate: Acquired by Giant Eagle
- Successor: Giant Eagle
- Headquarters: Cleveland, Ohio
- Area served: Ohio, Illinois, California
- Products: supermarkets/food-drug stores
- Subsidiaries: Fazio's, Dominick's, Fazio's Shopping Bag

Fisher Foods, later known as Fazio's, was an American supermarket chain based in Cleveland.

== History ==
=== Beginning ===
Fisher Foods, Cleveland’s largest supermarket chain for its 80-year history, was founded in 1907 as Fisher Brothers Company. The Fisher Brothers, Manning and Charles, were natives of Jersey City, New Jersey. They started in the grocery business in New York City at the end of the 19th century, when Manning worked for James Butler, a grocer who owned 150 stores in the city. The brothers were eager to start their own chain, and opened their first store in Cleveland at 4623 Lorain Avenue.

=== Post-war era ===
Fisher Foods was not doing well in the post-war era. By the mid-1960s, the 75-store chain was losing money on $86 million in annual sales, and held only 12% of the Cleveland market it had once dominated. In 1965, a group of investors that included two sets of brothers, Carl and John Fazio and Sam and Frank Costa, purchased a controlling interest in Fisher Foods for an estimated $3.1 million. The investors were all involved in the Stop-N-Shop Super Markets Association. The purchase merged Fisher Foods with the other investors' namesake chains, the Fazio's and Costa supermarkets.

=== Expansion ===
In 1968, Fisher Foods made its first acquisition outside the Ohio market, with the purchase of Chicago's Dominick's, an 18-store chain with locations throughout the city and near the suburbs. Dominick's was a family-owned business with a good reputation. Dominick's was a relatively small chain compared to Chicago market leader Jewel Tea, other competitors National Tea and A&P, but that changed in the coming years as Dominick's grew tremendously under Fisher Foods, eventually making it number two in the market. Dominick DiMatteo, Jr., company president and son of Dominick's founder, was named as vice president of Fisher Foods.

Fisher Foods also acquired the Kanter's chain in Cincinnati, Ohio

Fisher Foods entered the fast food business in 1969, when it acquired a stake in Columbus, Ohio-based National Fast Food Corporation, owners of the Arthur Treacher's Fish & Chips chain. As part of the agreement, Fisher Foods took over territory rights for Arthur Treacher's in the Cleveland and Chicago markets, then totaling over 100 restaurants. Another company Fisher Foods took over during the late sixties was Clabers, a seven-store chain of department stores in the Pittsburgh, Pennsylvania, area.

The company expanded into the Southern California market in 1972 with the purchase of Shopping Bag, which was itself the combination of a chain that Vons had to divest due to an antitrust ruling in the Supreme Court and the Southern California A&P operation. Following the merger, the stores were rebranded Fazio's Shopping Bag. These stores were later sold to Albertsons, which bought 46 Fazio's stores in 1978 from Fisher Foods. Albertsons already operated 47 stores in Southern California, mainly in Orange County.

In the 1980s, the DiMatteo family became unhappy with the agreement and bought back the Dominick's chain for $100 million.

=== Downfall ===
In 1988, Fisher Foods was in financial problems, and merged with Rini-Rego Stop N Shop chain and Seaway Foods Wholesaler to form Riser Foods. In 1997, Riser Foods was absorbed into Pittsburgh, Pennsylvania-based Giant Eagle for $403 million.

== Chains ==
- Dominick's (Chicago)
- Fazio's (Ohio)
- Fazio's Shopping Bag (Southern California)

== Sources ==
- Fisher Foods History
