= Sam Steinberg =

Hungarian-born Canadian businessman (1905–1978)

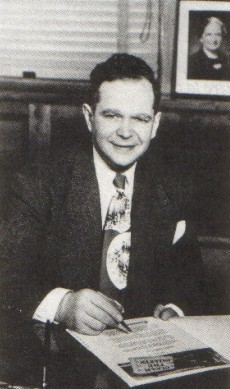
Steinberg in the 1940s

Samuel Steinberg, OC (December 25, 1905 – May 24, 1978) was a Hungarian-born Canadian businessman, investor and philanthropist. He was an immigrant to Canada who transformed the grocery store founded by his mother, Steinberg's Supermarket, into one of the largest chains in the Province of Quebec. By the time of his death in 1978, Steinberg's was the largest supermarket chain in Quebec.

== Life and career ==
When he was four years old, Steinberg's family immigrated to Canada and settled in Montreal, where his mother opened a small grocery store. In 1934, Steinberg opened his first self-service grocery supermarket in the city. A visionary, he transformed food retailing through mass merchandising, mechanization, and personnel management that included a bilingualism policy for all company employees. By the end of the 1950s, his stores were a dominant force throughout the Province of Quebec, and in 1959 expanded into the province of Ontario with the acquisition of 38 Grand Union stores. Steinberg would drive around the city, size up an area very quickly, acquire a property, and build a store on the site. He later set up Ivanhoe Investments.

Steinberg married his cousin Helen (née Roth) in 1929. The couple funded a number of philanthropic causes including The Pavilion of Judaism at Expo 67, the Helen & Sam Steinberg Foundation's Geriatric Day Hospital, the Family Career Scientist Award and the Sam Steinberg Award For Young Jewish Entrepreneur of the Year given by the Jewish Chamber of Commerce of Montreal.

Steinberg was made an Officer of the Order of Canada and inducted into the Canadian Business Hall of Fame for his contribution to the Canadian economy. He was the subject of a 1974 National Film Board of Canada documentary, After Mr. Sam, which explored the issue of his impending retirement and his replacement.

Steinberg died from heart failure ailment on May 24, 1978 at the age of 72 after being taken to the hospital the same day. He was survived by three daughters: Marilyn (died 2022), Evelyn (died 1993) and Mitzi (died 2019). Steinberg's second-born daughter, Rita, died in 1970. Disagreement among the daughters led to the sale of the family business in 1989, and the Steinberg family name disappeared from the stores in 1992. Helen Steinberg died in 2007 at the age of 98, and she was buried next to her husband in Montreal's Shaar Hashomayim Cemetery in Mount Royal.

== See also ==
- H. Arnold Steinberg (nephew)
- List of grocers
