= Omni Superstore =

American supermarket chain

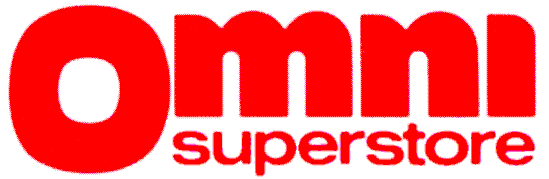
- Type: Supermarket
- Industry: Retail
- Founded: 1987
- Defunct: 1997
- Fate: Converted to Dominick's
- Headquarters: Northlake, Illinois
- Products: Bakery, dairy, deli, frozen foods, general grocery, meat, pharmacy, produce, seafood, snacks, liquor
- Parent: Dominick's
- Website: None

Omni Superstore was a chain of supermarkets in the Chicago area owned by the Chicago-area grocery store chain Dominick's. In 1997, Dominick's phased out Omni and converted the stores into Dominick's because the concept was not generating enough revenue compared to other Dominick's stores.

== History ==
=== Opening ===
Typical Omni Superstore Floorplan.

In April 1987, Dominick's Finer Foods opened the first Omni Superstore in the Lake View Plaza in Orland Park, Illinois, at the corner of 159th Street and LaGrange Road.

Dominick's created Omni Superstore in order to compete with the introduction of Cub Foods into the Chicago grocery market in the mid-1980s. Dominick's and their developers referred to Omni Superstore as a Cub Foods with more pizazz. Omni Superstore was Dominick's reaction and answer to the low prices and warehouse/no frills attitude that Cub Foods possessed. (Cub Foods eventually left the Chicago Market in 2006 due to anti-trust regulations; its parent company Supervalu acquired the Jewel-Osco chain.)

17 more stores were to follow in the next 10 years in the Chicago metropolitan area. Omni would eventually be phased out by Dominick's for various reasons ranging from consumer preference to responding to competition from new stores such as Meijer (first Chicago-area store opened in August 1999), Whole Foods and Wal-Mart entering the Chicago market.

=== Entry into Indiana ===
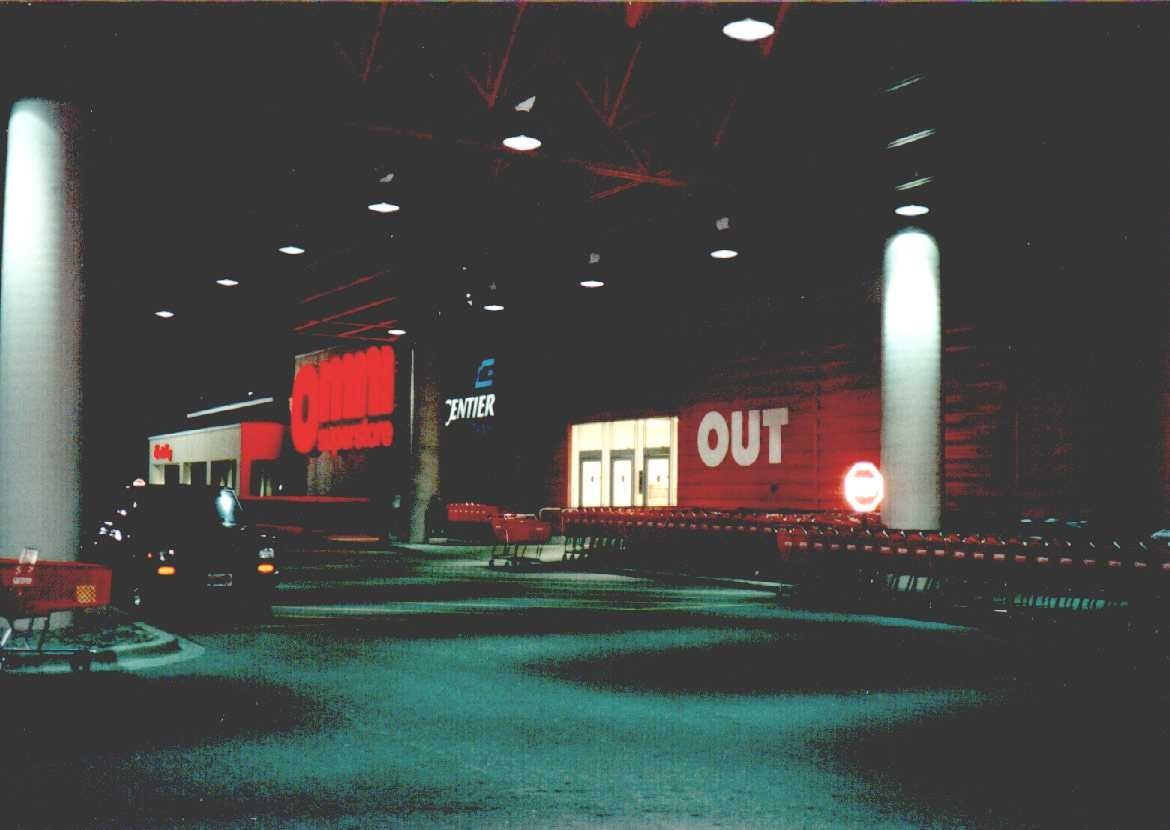
Omni Superstore 1991 Schererville, Indiana Canopy for Loading Groceries.

Dominick's opened an Omni Superstore in 1991 in Schererville, Indiana. The store became a Dominick's in 1997 and closed in 1999 and sat empty for four years.

When Omni Superstore moved into Strack & Van Til's home territory of Northwest Indiana in 1991, Strack's posted billboards that said "We still bag em" referring to the fact that Strack's still bagged your groceries but customers at Omni have to bag their own items. Omni Superstore and Strack & Van Til competed effectively and both sustained loyal customers and good business, up until the fallout of Omni Superstore to Dominick's.

Dominick's also planned for there to be an Omni Superstore in Hammond, Indiana at the Hammond Mills shopping center at 165th and Indianapolis Boulevard. The Hammond Omni Superstore opened as a Dominick's in January 1999. Due to the local shopping habits of consumers in Hammond, Dominick's European higher price point Fresh Store did not succeed in Hammond and the store closed 7 months later. This was Dominick's final exit out of the Indiana market.

=== Expansion and conversion to Dominick's ===
Omni Superstore continued to add stores under the leadership of Dominick's. However, the Omni format was not doing as well as the Dominick's Fresh stores, so Domimick's announced in October 1997 that the Omni stores would be changed to the Fresh format. Prior to the sale of Dominick's to Safeway, it was suggested in Crain's Chicago Business that a potential buyer might have done well to expand the Omni stores beyond Chicago.

Many of the Omni stores converted to Dominick's closed because many customers were used to shopping at Omni for lower prices and a "no frills" type shopping experience. Even though the store decor was much improved and gave a European feel, many regular customers fled because prices increased dramatically.

In 1998, Dominick's was purchased by Safeway. The fresh market concept was eliminated and many poorly performing stores were later closed.

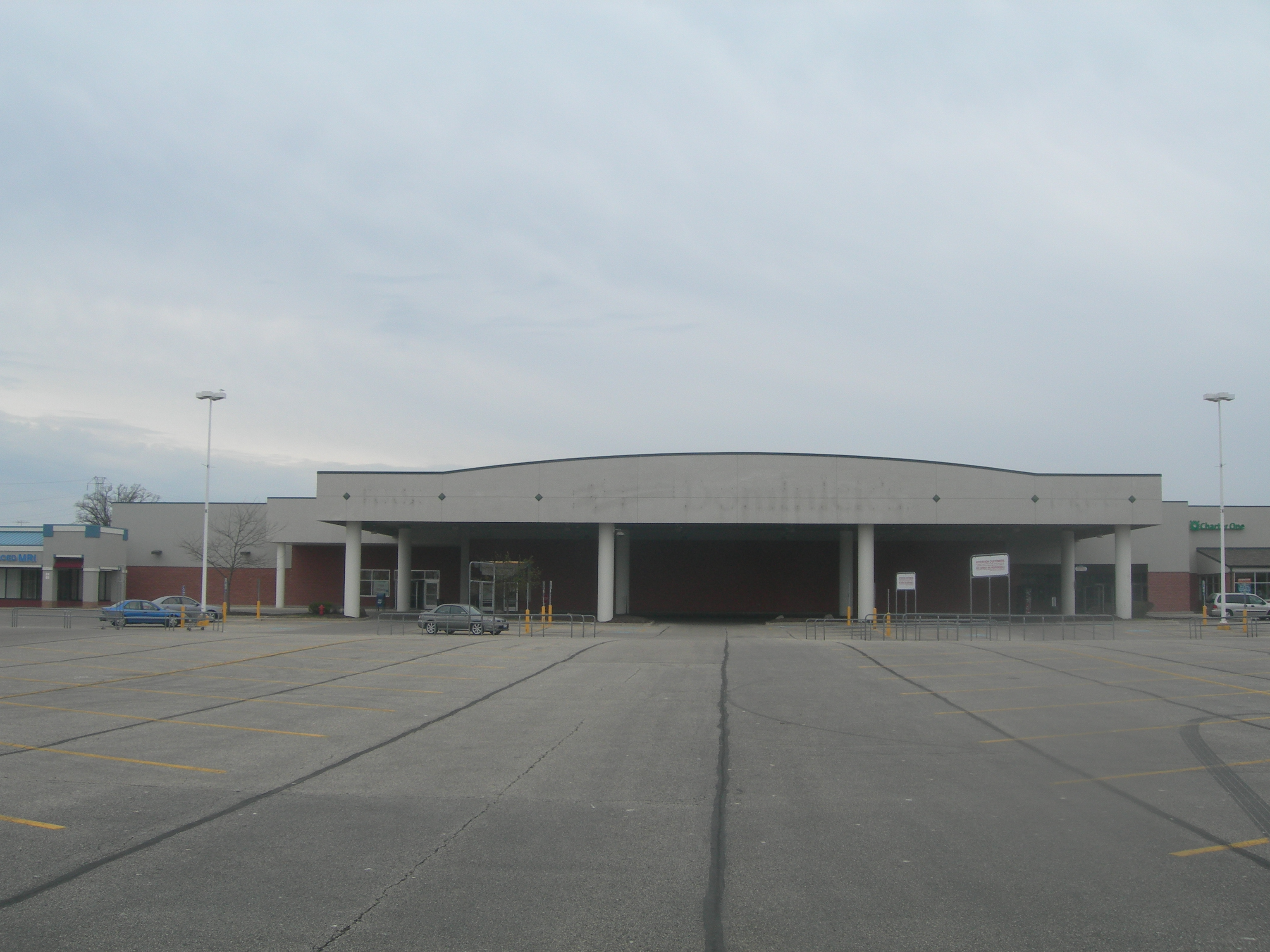
Former OMNI superstore in Round Lake Beach that was converted into a Dominick's in 1997. This store closed in 2007 and was demolished eight years later.

The Clybourn Avenue Dominick's in Chicago is the remaining Omni Superstore buildings now occupied by Dominick's. According to a Dominick's manager, the Dominick's that opened in Matteson, Illinois in 1989 was supposed to be opened as an Omni Superstore, but at the last minute was changed to a Dominick's due to municipality issues. In 1997 in nearby Chicago Heights, Illinois the Sun Times reported construction began on a 91,531-square-foot (8,503.5 m^{2}) Omni Superstore, which never opened at the northwest corner of Lincoln Hwy and Western Avenue. Additionally, according to the Northwest Indiana Times newspaper, the Dominick's that opened in Hammond, Indiana in 1999 was supposed to be an Omni Superstore as well. This store opened as a Dominick's and closed within 7 months. It was later reopened as a Kroger under the name of Food4Less.

Safeway appears to be keeping the rights to the Omni name by using it on a line of organic store brand foods in Dominick's and other Safeway stores.

=== Legacy ===
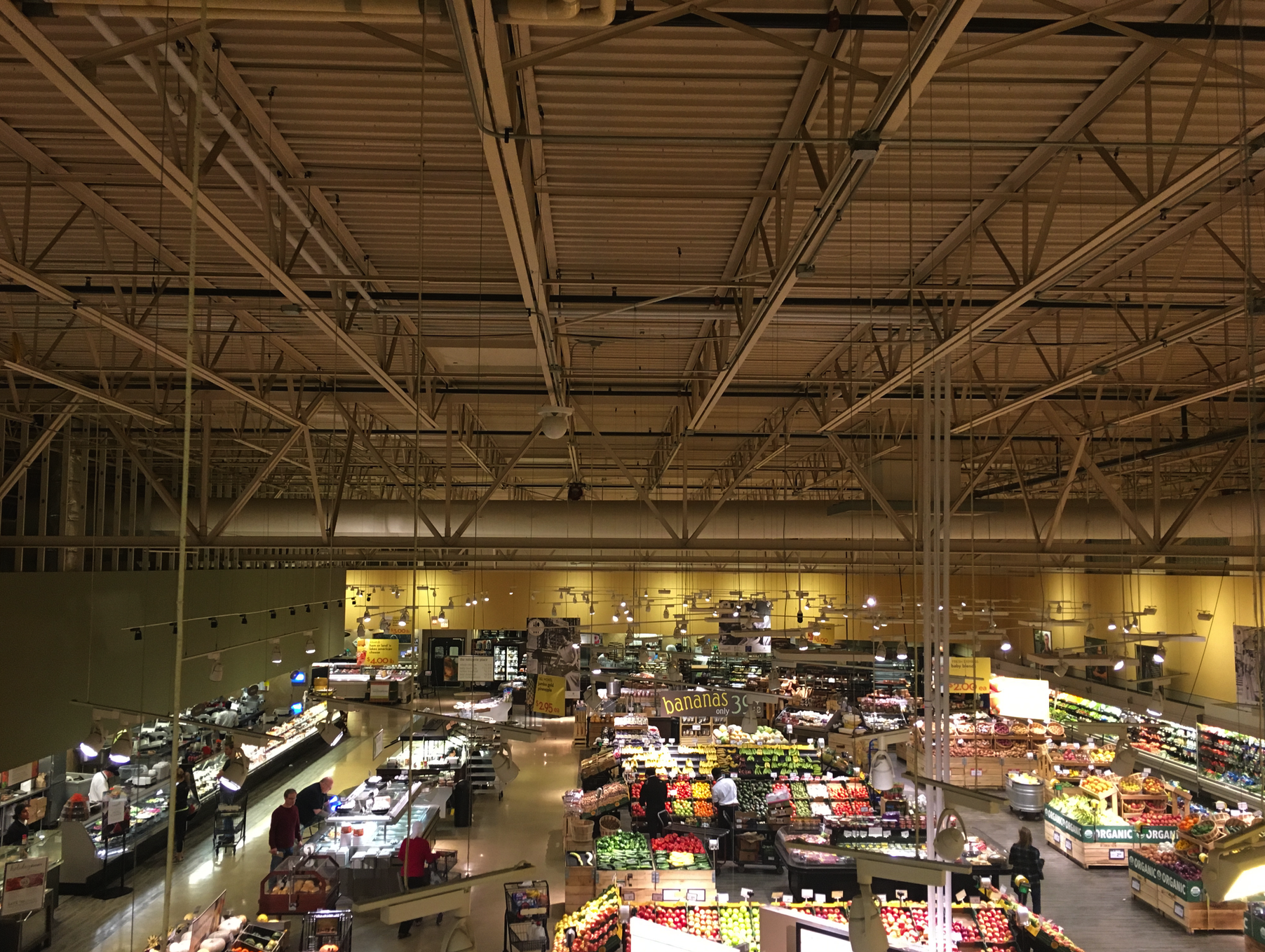
Current Marianos, Former Dominick's/Omni styled location on Cumberland Avenue, Park Ridge, IL

The CEO of Dominick's, Bob Mariano, who also ran the Omni Superstore discount division, has created a chain of stores in the Chicago area under the Mariano's banner. The Mariano's banner clearly shows a store operations model and store design similar to that of the Bob Mariano run Omni Superstore. Some features include:

-Open exposed ceiling structure with a warehouse loft style feeling.

-Employees are only allowed to wear black and white. Men must wear a dress shirt and black tie, while women wear more casual black and white attire.

-Overhead Paging is quite frequent.

-A large presence of ethnic and local products tailored to the neighborhood.

-A large bulk food aisle with Costco styled multi packs.

-A store footprint that closely resembles that of an Omni/Dominick's under Mariano's leadership.

== Store Layout ==
=== Omni Superstore Graphics and Departmental Naming ===
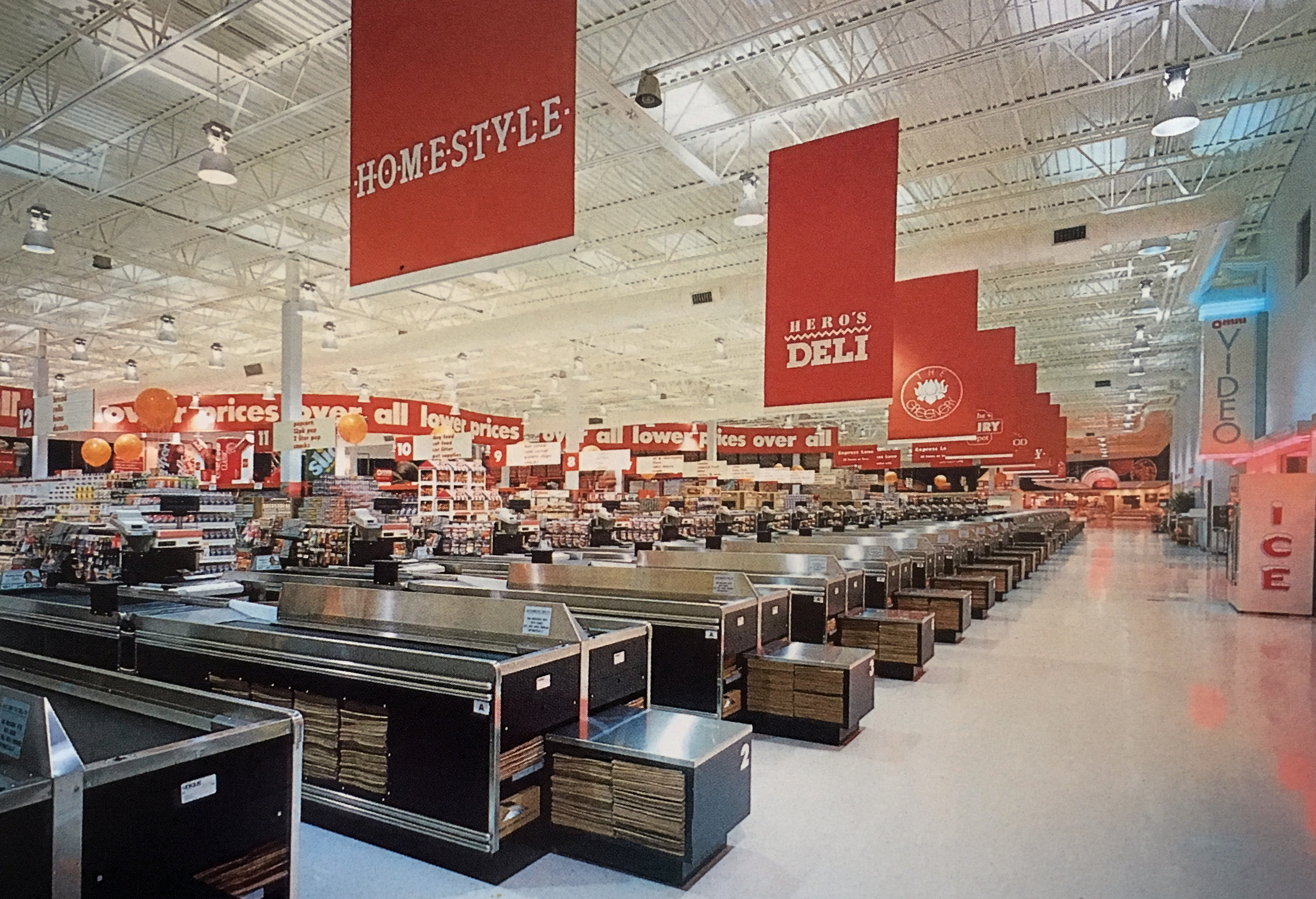
Typical Omni Superstore 1988.

Omni Superstore featured a bakery, Hero's Deli, Field Fresh Produce Section, Great Lakes Seafood, The Dairy Depot, The Greenery Floral Department, 1 hour photo department, large general merchandise department, Homestyle home goods department, The Cheese Shop, cosmetics counter, pharmacy department, and a wholesale/family pack foods area with large 20' orange industrial steel shelving that separated the general merchandise area from the grocery area. Early Omni Superstore's contained a video department while newer ones dropped this department. The Orland Park Omni had a separate Video store entrance next to the exit doors.

Departmental names were synonymous with Chicago, the Midwest and Great Lakes. This was highly innovative as most US grocery stores at the time, called departments simply, "produce," "dairy," and "meat department." This new naming convention was the responsibility of the team of Louis Germano, Director of Dominick's store planning, Schafer Associates who was Omni's project architect and Jarob Design/Programmed Products who were responsible for the signage and graphics.

=== Store layout ===
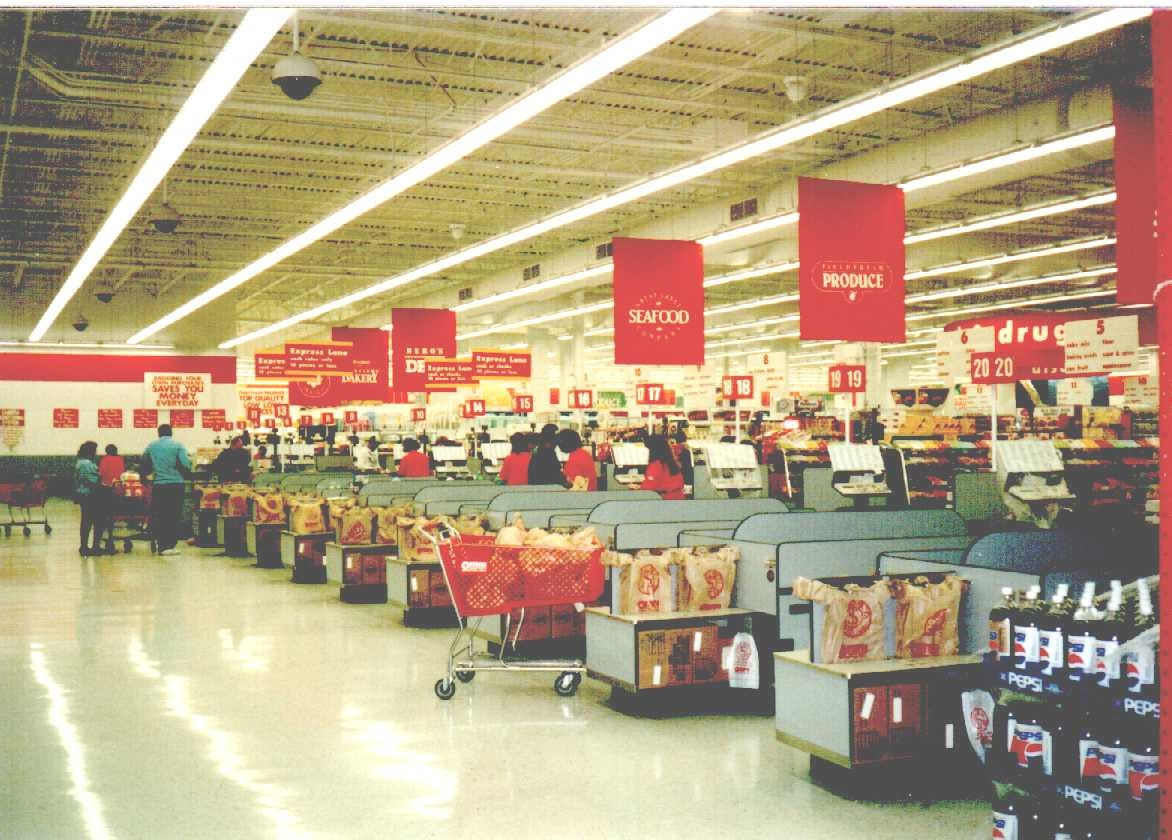
Omni Superstore 1991 Schererville, Indiana Checkout Area.

Except for Round Lake Beach, IL and McHenry, IL Omni, which was laid out like a conventional Dominick's, most all Omni's followed a similar layout. The only deviation from this was the constant experimentation of where to place the 1 hour photo department/electronics counter and cosmetics counters. Orland Park Omni had the Cosmetics at the back of the store with the 1 hour photo on a mezzanine, while Aurora had the 1 hour photo counter directly next to the pharmacy while Crestwood and Schererville had the cosmetics at the front on the other side of the wall from the Hero's Deli. Merchandising and store layout experimentation was frequent at Omni. Although the stores followed the basic floor plan, each Omni had a different feel than the other.

There were no "flipped floor plan" Omni's. That is, you entered every Omni on the right hand side of the building and exited on the Left side of the building.

A large 15' wide aisle led customers from the front entrance directly towards the back of the store. On the right, perpendicular to the main aisle, were the general merchandise shelving gondolas. A tall mezzanine housed the 1 Hour Photo Department in the center of these general merchandise aisles. To the left of the main front to back walkway was the large 20' shelving and beyond that the grocery department, which was larger than the general merchandise aisle and consisted of over 15 aisles.

The produce department and bakery were located at the far left end of the store. Unlike most supermarkets where the produce department is near the main entrance, the "Field Fresh Produce" department, "The Greenery" floral department and Main Bakery were located at the last stop before the checkouts.

The Hero's Deli was located directly to the right of the entrance in the general merchandise area. Customers were forced to walk through the deli area and naturally walk through the general merchandise area before they made it to the grocery section. A section called Omni "Superbuys" was located in the general merchandise area, which featured deep discount items.

Space-frame canopies held signage and lighting at many of the departments along the back wall near Great Lakes Seafood, Dairy Depot, Meat Department, Field Fresh Produce, and the Greenery. The department names were labeled with different fonts and different graphics mounted on the space-frame canopy.

Early locations used Ceramic Metal Halide lighting, while later stores used industrial strip fluorescent lighting.

An Average Omni Superstore was 75,000 sq ft (7,000 m^{2}). to 95,000 sq ft (8,800 m^{2})., while its sister Dominick's Food and Drug combo stores ranged around 65,000 sq ft (6,000 m^{2}).

=== Other Unique Features ===
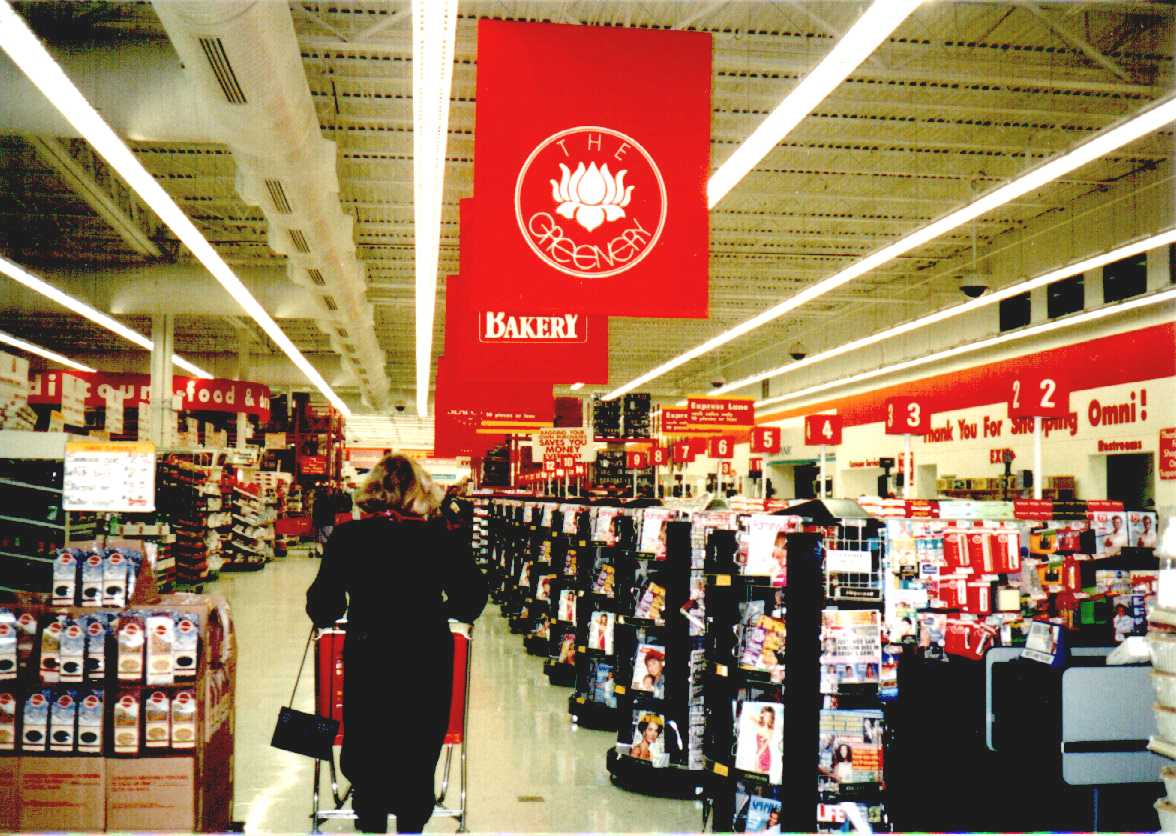
Omni Superstore 1991 Schererville, Indiana Main Walkway at Checkouts.

The first Omni Superstore in Orland Park originally used a large black 10' high banding with photographs of the different items in the department on the perimeter walls. This was eventually painted over and a white and orange color scheme with an orange band running the length of the perimeter walls.

A large "flying wave" Orange and White banner was hung in a curved wavy fashion over the entire grocery sales area. Early stores said "Lower Prices Overall" while the newer stores said "Discount Food and Drug."

Since 1988, St. Paul Federal Bank was the main banking center in the Illinois Omni Superstores. In Indiana, Centier Bank opened a branch in the Indiana Omni Store.

== Slogans ==
- "Take Home the Difference"
- "Lower Prices Overall" (the most common slogan)
- "Discount Food and Drug"

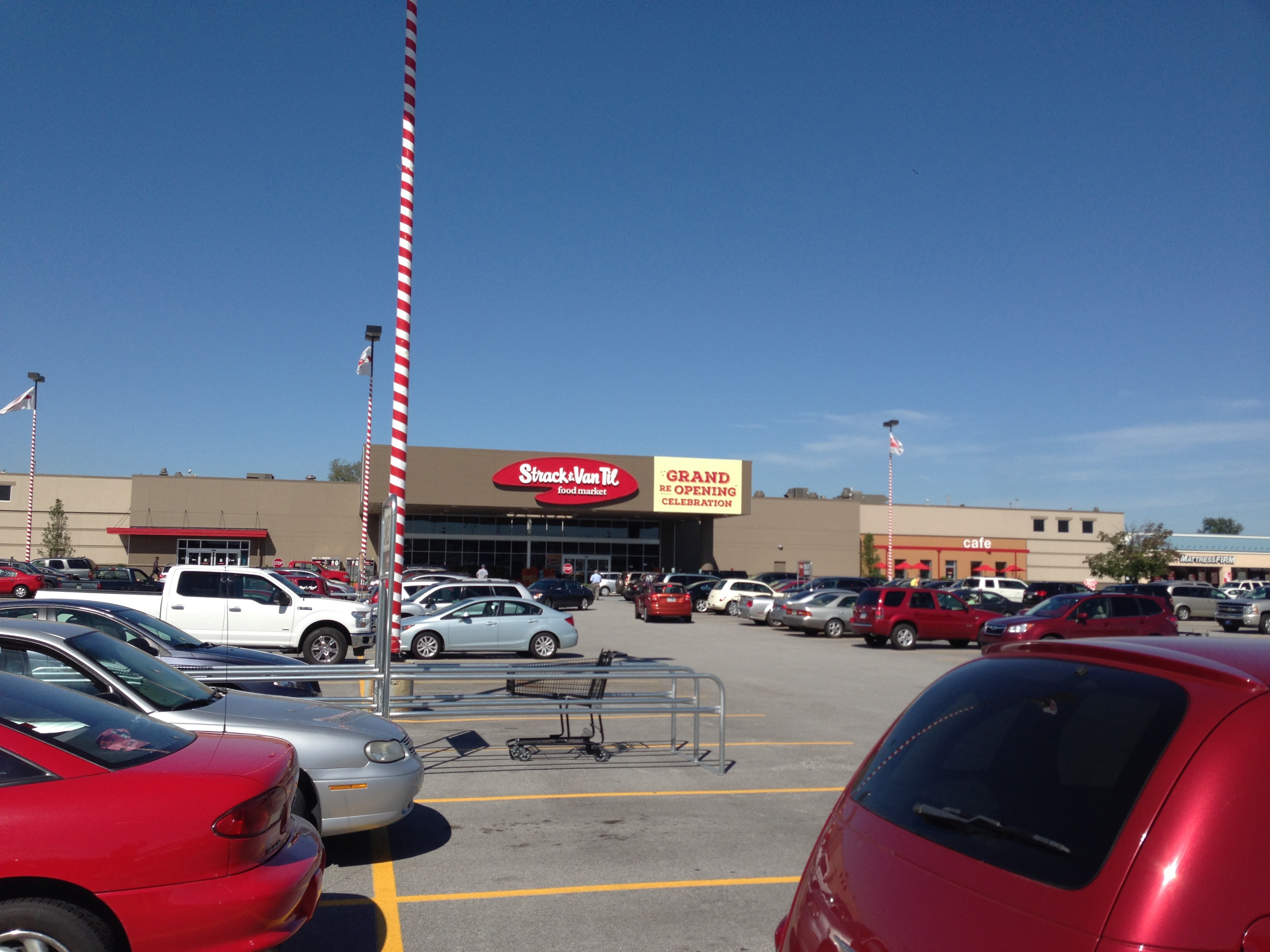
Omni Superstore opened in 1991 Schererville, Indiana, now a Strack and Van Til Supermarket 2015, notice the shortened front Omni canopy for loading groceries in the rain.

Omni Superstore Receipt. Notice the 0301 at bottom of receipt. It signifies that this is store 301.
