= Charles Von der Ahe =

Danish-American businessman (1882–1973)

Charles Theodore Von der Ahe
- Born: August 29, 1882; Copenhagen, Denmark
- Died: June 4, 1973 (aged 90); Los Angeles, California, U.S.
- Resting place: Holy Cross Cemetery, Culver City, California
- Occupations: Founder of Vons Groceteria and Vons, businessman
- Spouse: Linda Augusta Luer (m. 1907–1973)
- Children: 8
- Parent(s): Rudolph Peter Von der Ahe, Caroline Larsen

Charles Theodore Von der Ahe (August 29, 1882 – June 4, 1973) was a Danish-American businessman, best known as an early innovator in the grocery business in Southern California, and founder of Vons supermarket chain in Southern California along with his two sons, Wilfred and Theodore.

== Personal life and family ==
Von der Ahe's parents were Charles Rudolph Peter Von der Ahe (1858–1918) and Caroline Sophie Larsen (1858–1917).

Von der Ahe's family moved from Denmark to the United States in 1889, and they eventually settled in Illinois. Even though Charles was born in Denmark, the Von der Ahe family was of German extraction, having moved to Denmark one or two generations earlier.

Von der Ahe was married to Linda Augusta Luer (1887–1973, née Linda Luer) in 1907. The Von der Ahes had eight children, with five boys and three girls: Theodore (Ted), Wilfred (Wil), Karl, Walter, Virginia, Clyde, Muriel, and Dorothy.

Von der Ahe was active in civic and charitable causes, and was a principal donor for the construction of the Charles Von der Ahe Library at Loyola Marymount University, which opened in 1959. The library served as the main LMU library until the Fall of 2009 when the new William H. Hannon Library was opened. The new library contains a Von der Ahe suite located on the third floor.

== Vons – early history ==
Von der Ahe began his career as a delivery boy for a meat shop and grocery store in Illinois. Then, he went west to seek his fortune. He arrived in Los Angeles, and in 1906 with a $1200 investment, he opened Von's Groceteria, a 20-foot store at the corner of 7th and Figueroa streets. Von der Ahe pioneered a system of cash and carry (as opposed to charge and deliver). He also pioneered the combination store concept: his concept of leasing storefronts to produce vendors and butchers, an innovation which led to the development of the first supermarket in California. His business grew quickly, and he had expanded to 87 stores by 1928. He sold the business to MacMarr Stores in 1929, in anticipation of the stock market crash, and retired from the business.

A few years later, Von der Ahe's sons Wilfred and Theodore convinced him to provide financial backing, and the Von der Ahes opened the Vons Grocery Company in 1932. In 1948, Vons opened a pioneering store which offered self-service, pre-packaged produce, meat, and deli items, which has been called by some the first supermarket and established Vons and the Von der Ahes as leaders in the industry. Many features of supermarkets today, such as volume buying, large stores, open refrigerated cases, centralized meat-cutting, and the cent-off food coupon, stem from the early days of competition between Vons and Ralphs. By 1958, Vons was the third-largest grocery chain in greater Los Angeles. When the company went public, Vons had annual sales of $100 million and 28 stores. In 1960 it acquired the sixth-largest competitor Shopping Bag Food Stores, a merger that was challenged by the Federal Trade Commission on antitrust grounds. In 1966 the United States Supreme Court ruled against Vons in United States v. Von's Grocery Co. (384 U.S. 270), forcing a re-divestiture of the stores. The Von der Ahe family sold the chain to Household Finance Corporation in 1969. In 1970, Vons had 128 stores, making it the 2nd largest supermarket chain in southern California behind Safeway. By the end of 2011, Vons had 325 stores across Southern California and Nevada.

Von der Ahe was President and Chairman of Vons.

== See also ==
- List of grocers
