= William Davila =

American businessman (1931–2014)

- Born: April 25, 1931; Los Angeles, California, US
- Died: February 14, 2014 (aged 82)
- Other names: Guillermo Davila, Bill Davila
- Occupations: U.S.A.F. airman, Chief Executive Officer of Vons Supermarkets
- Years active: Late 1940s-1998
- Spouse: Dorothy Davila
- Children: Diane, Deborah, Lisa, David and Bill Jr.
- Awards: Marshall School of Business Food Industry Executive of the Year, 1994

William Salvador "Bill" Davila (born Guillermo Davila; April 25, 1931 – February 14, 2014) was an American soldier and businessman. He was involved with many nationally known companies in the United States, including Vons Supermarkets, over which he presided twice, first from 1984 to 1990 and then as president emeritus from 1992 to 1998; Home Depot, Wells Fargo, Hormel Foods and others. He was also president of the Western Association of Food Chains (WAFC).

Davila also became a television and radio personality in the Los Angeles area, the Los Angeles Times once declaring he had been "catapulted to near-celebrity status by his television and radio pitches". He participated on Vons radio and television commercials.

== Early life ==
Bill Davila who was of Mexican descent, was born to Salvador Davila and Polly Lopez-Davila in Los Angeles, California, on April 25, 1931. He was the couple's only child. Davila attended the Mount Lowe Military Academy from where he went on to the Polytechnic High School in Los Angeles.

As a young man, Davila obtained a job at Vons sweeping floors. It wasn't long before he met his future wife Dorothy while at the job.

Davila joined the United States Air Force in 1951; he was discharged in 1954 having served as a drill Sergeant.

In 1952, he married Dorothy Davila.

== Success with Vons ==
Davila returned to work at Vons almost immediately after being honorably discharged from the Air Force, in 1955. Twenty years later, in 1975, Kenneth O. Olsen, then president of the Vons Grocery Company, announced that Davila, along with Donald Stuetz, J.R. Risher, William Birney and Richard London would be named Vice-President of the company.

Vons became the official supermarket chain of the 1984 Summer Olympics in Los Angeles. About that time, Davila was named the company's president and CEO, becoming the first Mexican-American ever to be named president of a large American supermarket chain.

Davila soon led Vons' expansion into the Southern-Californian Hispanic market by opening a series of stores named Tianguis, as well as Von's Pavilion.

Davila decided to retire briefly in 1990, but returned to Vons in 1992, being appointed President Emeritus of the company during that era.

In 1994, Davila was honored by the USC Marshall School of Business with their Food Industry Executive of the Year Award for that year. He would later be a keynote speaker at the school's annual "legends of the industry" luncheon.

Davila was a customer of Panda Express, where he met and befriended Panda Express' founder Andrew Cherng. Eventually, Cherng convinced Davila to let him open some Panda Express restaurants inside Vons stores.

Davila retired for a second time from Von's in 1998.

== Personal life ==
William and Dorothy Davila had three daughters (Diane Jones, Deborah McGuire and Lisa Franklin) and two sons (David and Bill Jr.)

=== Death ===
Towards the end of his life, Davila suffered from Alzheimer's disease, which led to his death on February 14, 2014.
