= Vivien Twidwell =

Washington State politician

Member of the Washington House of Representatives from the 21st district
- In office January 14, 1957 – January 9, 1961 Serving with Harry S. Elway, Jr. (1957 – 1959); Gene G. Neva (1957 – 1961)
- Preceded by: Harry S. Elway, Jr. Elmer Huhta; John K. Yearout
- Succeeded by: Eric O. Anderson; Jack Burtch

Personal details
- Born: June 26, 1908 Aberdeen, Washington, U.S.
- Died: March 27, 1981 (aged 72) Tacoma, Washington, U.S.
- Party: Democratic
- Occupation: Grocer

Vivien Twidwell (June 26, 1908 – March 27, 1981) was an American politician who served as a member of the Washington House of Representatives from 1957 to 1961. She represented Washington's 21st legislative district as a Democrat.
