= Walter Deubener =

American grocer (1887–1980)

Walter H. Deubener (1887–1980) was a grocer from St. Paul, Minnesota who in 1912 invented the handled paper grocery bag. Following his death, his estate became Camp Courage North. The annual Deubener Award, given out to small businesses by the St. Paul Area Chamber of Commerce, is named after him.

== Life ==
In the early 1900s, Walter Deubener and his wife, Lydia, owned and operated the S. S. Kresge grocery store on Seventh Street in downtown St. Paul. After noticing that his customers were having a difficult time carrying their groceries by hand, Deubener began experimenting with ways to get around the problem. He noticed that the customers were limited in the amount that they could buy because there was no easy way to carry large purchases. After a few months of experimentation, Deubener awoke in the middle of the night with an idea. He wrote himself a note to punch holes in the bag and use string running under the bag. He created the first shopping bag by starting with an ordinary paper sack, punched holes near the top and bottom, then reinforcing the bottom with string and running the string through holes in the side of the bag and over the top to create handles. He and his wife Lydia made several bags the first morning and ran to their store to test them. They discovered that they could put over 20 pounds of canned goods in the bags and easily carry this. They made 50 bags that first day and offered them to their customers for $.05 each. The bags sold out before noon that day. Mr Deubener went across the street to his bank and had the initial invention samples and write up notarized so he could protect his future patent. Mrs Deubener fancied up the first bags by cutting pictures out of magazines and pasting them on the bags. Eventually, the couple patented the bag (Patent number: 1713747, Filing date: Aug 18, 1927, Issue date: May 21, 1929), sold their store and went into the shopping bag business full-time.

Walter and Lydia Deubener used their summer lake estate to entertain guests, such as the owners and buyers from his large accounts like Kresge, his friends from the Saint Paul Athletic Club, and prominent Saint Paul business people like bankers, investors and the Twin City elite of the day. The Deubeners invited everyone to visit the well-flowered estate that was also a major bird sanctuary. All of the local people from Lake George and the local resorts were invited to the Deubener home every night during the summer months. The Deubeners had a huge volleyball court and badminton courts for their guests. Each night, a bonfire was started and Edwin the handyman would cook hot dogs and hamburgers and cut watermelons that had been on ice all day for the guests. There was always candy also that Mr Deubener would pick up from the candy wholesaler in Bemidji.

The Deubeners would not allow any smoking on their property. Mr Deubener was also vehemently against drinking of alcohol. All around the property were signs reading "no stinkweed, no firewater". The property was loaded with birdhouses and many bird feeders. Mr. Deubener was known to take long daily walks through the woods on his extensive property.

Deubener died on March 29, 1980.

== Legacy ==
Walter Deubener died in 1980 at the age of 93. His legacy includes the Deubener-Juenemann Foundation and the Walter and Lydia Deubener Awards, which are given annually by the St. Paul Area Chamber of Commerce in recognition of business innovation. A contributor to many charities, Deubener donated his beautiful summer home and the adjacent guest cabins and library and surrounding property near Lake George as the site for Courage North, a facility for the hearing-impaired and teens and adults with other general disabilities that is operated by Courage Center of Golden Valley. The Deubeners donated the property along with a substantial endowment to allow continued operation. Walter and Lydia Deubener had no children and wanted Camp Courage to be use by the children they never could have. The Deubeners also left a substantial donation to the Boy Scouts of America.

== Resources ==
- Walter H. Deubener - MN150
