= Bob Mariano (executive) =

American businessman

- Born: March 1950 (age 76); Chicago, Illinois
- Occupation: corporate executive
- Known for: Former CEO and chairman of Roundy's
- Spouse: Nina

Robert Anthony "Bob" Mariano (born February 1950; pronounced /mɑːriːɑːnoʊ/) is an American businessman, formerly CEO and chairman of Milwaukee, Wisconsin-based supermarket chain Roundy's.

== Early life ==
Robert Anthony Mariano was born in March 1950 in Jefferson Park, Chicago, Illinois to Dorothy and Robert John Mariano. After a short time in Chicago they moved to nearby Arlington Heights, where he grew up as the oldest of his two brothers and two sisters.

== Education and early career ==
He went to high school at Loyola Academy and in 1967 he began working as a part-time deli clerk at a Dominick's supermarket. He initially wanted to go into pre-med, but after applying unsuccessfully to five medical schools, he switched to the pharmaceutical industry. He was rejected by thirteen different companies, one of which said he looked too young. He was eventually hired as a salesman for Oscar Mayer, a company for which his father, a butcher, had also worked. After working there for a year and a half, he was hired in 1973 as an assistant manager for a Dominick's in Des Plaines. He became close friends with Dominick's owner Dominick DiMatteo. Mariano earned his Bachelor of Science in Biology from the University of Illinois at Chicago, and his Master of Business Administration degree from University of Chicago. He rose steadily through the ranks of Dominick's becoming president and then CEO in 1996. Two years later, Safeway bought Dominick's, causing Mariano and many other executives to leave the company.

== Roundy's ==
After several years as a consultant, in 2002 he was named CEO of Roundy's, headquartered in Milwaukee, Wisconsin. In 2010, the first Mariano's Fresh Market opened in Arlington Heights. In late December 2013, Dominick's announced that it planned to close all 72 of its Chicago area stores, and eleven of them were purchased to be converted into Mariano's. The largest Mariano's opened in June 2015 in Northbrook, at 90,600 square feet (8,420 m^{2}).

On November 11, 2015, Ohio-based retailer Kroger announced that it was buying Roundy's for $800 million, having received approval from the boards of both companies. As of November 2015, the chain operates over 150 supermarkets and over 100 pharmacies in Wisconsin and under the names of Pick 'n Save, Copps, and Metro Market. Mariano has additionally opened 34 of his namesake stores in the Chicago area. They plan to open 39 by the end of 2016, but their eventual goal is a total of 50 Mariano's.

Mariano announced on July 12, 2016 that he would retire as Roundy's CEO on September 1, although he would remain as a strategic adviser for two years.
