= Gately's People's Store =

Department store in Chicago, Illinois, U.S.

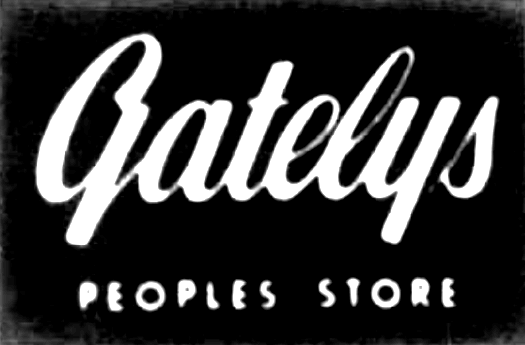
- The last Gately's People's Store logo

- 4th of July parade in front of Gately's store circa 1918
- Company type: Subsidiary
- Industry: Retail
- Founded: 1917
- Defunct: 1994

Gately's People's Store was a department store at 11201 S. Michigan Avenue, in the Roseland neighborhood of Chicago. It was described as "the biggest store on Michigan Avenue".

James Gately purchased the Peoples Store in 1917 and added his name. The store thrived until the late 1960s, when white flight led to widespread disinvestment in Roseland and surrounding neighborhoods. Much of the People’s Store’s traditional consumer base moved to the south and southwest suburbs during this time. In 1975, Gatelys opened a second, smaller store in southwest suburban Tinley Park, Illinois. The Michigan Avenue store closed in 1981, while the Tinley Park location lasted until 1994.

The Roseland store, which ranged from three to five stories in height, was abandoned after it closed in 1981. It was engulfed by an extra-alarm fire during the early morning hours of June 7, 2019. Demolition crews began razing the structure later that day.
