= Wilfred Von der Ahe =

German-American entrepreneur (1910–1998)

Wilfred Luer Von der Ahe
- Born: May 9, 1910; Los Angeles, California, U.S.
- Died: November 20, 1998 (aged 88); Studio City, Los Angeles, U.S.
- Resting place: Holy Cross Cemetery, Culver City, CA
- Education: Loyola Marymount University
- Occupations: Founder and owner of vons, businessman
- Known for: Creating the first supermarket
- Spouse: Mary Jane Von der Ahe (m. 1934–1998)
- Children: 4
- Parent(s): Charles Von der Ahe, Linda Luer

Wilfred Luer Von der Ahe (May 9, 1910 – November 20, 1998) was a German American entrepreneur, best known as the co-founder of the Vons supermarket chain in Southern California.

== Personal life and family ==
Von der Ahe's parents were Charles T. Von der Ahe (1883–1973) and Linda Luer (1887–1973). He was one of eight children, with five boys and three girls: Theodore, Wilfred, Karl, Walter, Virginia, Clyde, Muriel, and Dorothy.

Von der Ahe was married to Mary Jane Von der Ahe (1911–2006, née Smith) in 1934, and they remained married for 64 years until his death. They had four children and 18 grandchildren.

== Vons Grocery Company ==
Von der Ahe's father Charles had opened Vons Groceteria in 1906, and expanded to 87 stores by 1928, but he sold the business a year later. A few years later, Von der Ahe and his brother Ted (Theodore) convinced their father Charles to provide financial backing, and they opened the Vons Grocery Company in 1932. In 1948, Vons opened a pioneering store which offered self-service, pre-packaged produce, meat, and deli items, which has been called by some the first supermarket and established Vons and Von der Ahes as leaders in the industry. Many features of supermarkets today, such as volume buying, the big store, the open refrigerated case, centralized meat-cutting, and the cent-off food coupon stem from the early days of competition between Vons and Ralphs. By 1958, Vons was the third-largest grocery chain in the Greater Los Angeles Area. When the company went public, Vons had annual sales of $100 million and 28 stores. In 1960, it acquired the sixth-largest competitor, Shopping Bag Food Stores, a merger that was challenged by the Federal Trade Commission on antitrust grounds. In 1966, the United States Supreme Court ruled against Vons in United States v. Von's Grocery Co. (384 U.S. 270), forcing a re-divestiture of the stores. The Von der Ahe family sold the chain to Household Finance Corporation in 1969. In 1970, Vons had 128 stores, making it the 2nd largest supermarket chain in southern California behind Safeway. By the end of 2011, Vons had 325 stores across Southern California and Nevada.

Jack Brown, chairman of Colton-based Stater Bros., a chain of 112 stores in Southern California, said Von der Ahe was a force in the industry in the 1950s, '60s, and '70s. "People from all over the world came to Southern California to see supermarkets and see the latest technology and merchandising ideas that were being put in place, and Vons certainly led the pack at that time," Brown said. "Will was very much a two-fisted competitor but was always very generous with his knowledge and that helped the industry in total. But having a store across the street from him was no cakewalk. The tougher he got, the tougher we had to get, and the customer benefited," Brown recalled.

After the sale to Household Finance Corporation, Von der Ahe stayed on as Corporate Vice President until he retired in 1975.

== Other activities ==
He played a leadership role in the food industry, serving as vice president of the Supermarket Institute, vice president of the National Association of Food Chains, and President of the California Grocers Association. Von der Ahe also continued to engage in community and civic leadership, serving on numerous boards, and engaging in philanthropy of Catholic and educational institutions as president of the Von der Ahe Foundation. He was also a leader in getting the food industry to make contributions to groups like the City of Hope and the University of Southern California's school of food management.

=== Positions held ===
- Corporate Vice President of Vons
- President of the California Grocers Association
- President of the Western Association of Food Chains
- President of the Southern California Businessmen's Association
- Vice president of the Supermarket Institute
- Vice president of the National Association of Food Chains
- Trustee of Loyola Marymount University
- Regent of Santa Clara University
- Director of the Food Employers Council
- Member of the Archdiocese's Education Foundation
- President of the Von der Ahe Foundation
- Advisory board member for Providence St. Joseph Medical Center, Little Sisters of the Poor Hospital, Little Company of Mary, and St. John of God Convalescent Hospital

== Philanthropy ==
Von der Ahe and his wife Mary Jane were well-known philanthropists in Los Angeles. Their gifts included $1 million to St. John's Seminary (California) in Camarillo to create two endowed chairs. The Von der Ahes provided funds to Loyola Marymount University to create the Wilfred and Mary Jane Von Der Ahe Communications Arts Complex. They were also founding donors for the Cathedral of Our Lady of the Angels.

== Honors and awards ==
- First inductee into the California Food Industry Hall of Achievement by California Grocers Association (awarded 1991)
- Cardinals' Award from Los Angeles Diocese (awarded 1992)
- Knight of Malta
- Knight of the Holy See: Knight Commander with Star of the Order of St. Gregory the Great (awarded 1997)
