= Fazio's Shopping Bag =

American supermarket chain

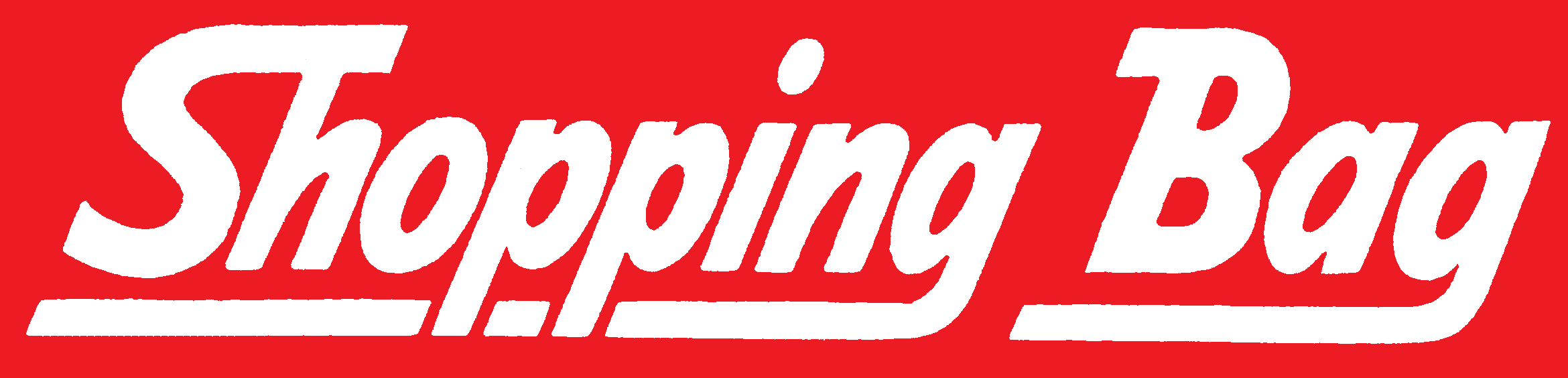
- Industry: Retailing
- Founded: 1930; 96 years ago in Los Angeles, California
- Defunct: 1978; 48 years ago
- Area served: Southern California
- Products: Bakery, dairy, deli, frozen foods, general grocery, meat, produce, seafood, snacks, liquor
- Parent: Vons (1960–1967); E.F. MacDonald (1967–1972); Fisher Foods (1972–1978)

Fazio's Shopping Bag—also known as Shopping Bag Food Stores—was a supermarket chain located in Southern California.

== History ==
Shopping Bag Food Stores began in 1930 as a single grocery store on Wilshire Boulevard, Los Angeles. In 1933, they opened their first supermarket, and in 1954 the company went public.

In January 1960, Shopping Bag —with 38 stores at that time— and Vons —with 28 stores— announced their merger, making it the second largest supermarket chain on the West Coast. The merger was challenged by the Federal Trade Commission, and after two lower court victories for Vons, in 1966 the Supreme Court of the United States reversed the decisions and ordered the divestiture.

In June 1967, Vons completed the sale of Shopping Bag Food Stores to E.F. MacDonald. This company later bought 31 A&P supermarkets in Los Angeles, converting them to Shopping Bag. In 1972, MacDonald sold the supermarket chain to Fisher Foods, which rebranded the stores as Fazio's Shopping Bag. In 1978, all stores were sold to Albertsons.
