= Dominick's =

Chicago-area grocery store chain

Dominick's Supermarkets, LLC
- Type: Subsidiary
- Industry: Retail (Grocery)
- Founded: 1918 in Chicago, Illinois
- Founder: Dominick DiMatteo
- Defunct: December 28, 2013; 12 years ago
- Fate: Liquidation
- Headquarters: Oak Brook, Illinois
- Area served: Metropolitan Chicago area
- Parent: Safeway Inc.
- Subsidiaries: Omni Superstore
- Website: Archived official website at the Wayback Machine (archive index)

Dominick's was a Chicago-area grocery store chain and subsidiary of Safeway Inc. Dominick's distribution center was located in Northlake, Illinois, while its management offices were located in Oak Brook, Illinois.

== History ==
=== Founding ===
Dominick DiMatteo, born in Sicily, founded the chain in 1918. The second Dominick's opened in 1934. In 1950, the DiMatteos opened their first supermarket, a 14,000-square-foot (1,300 m^{2}) store.

=== Expansion ===
By 1968, the chain had reached 19 stores. The family elected to sell their store to the Cleveland company Fisher Foods. The DiMatteos continued to operate the chain under the financial backing of Fisher Foods. Under Fisher, Dominick's acquired 24 stores plus a 462,000-square-foot distribution center in Northlake from Kroger in two separate transactions in 1970. The new acquisitions from Kroger increased the number of stores to 45. The Northlake distribution center, which was originally built by Kroger in 1961, was used by Dominick's until the chain was closed in 2014.

By the 1980s, the family had become unhappy with the agreement and bought back the chain in 1981 for $100 million. The DiMatteos continued to expand and had acquired 4 stores from Kohl's and 16 stores from Eagle in 1982 and 1985 respectively.

In 1986, Dominick's experimented with a discount grocery store concept called Jerry's Deep Discount Centers with just 3 units, but the experiment was terminated after a few months of operation.

=== Store design during Dominick's heyday ===
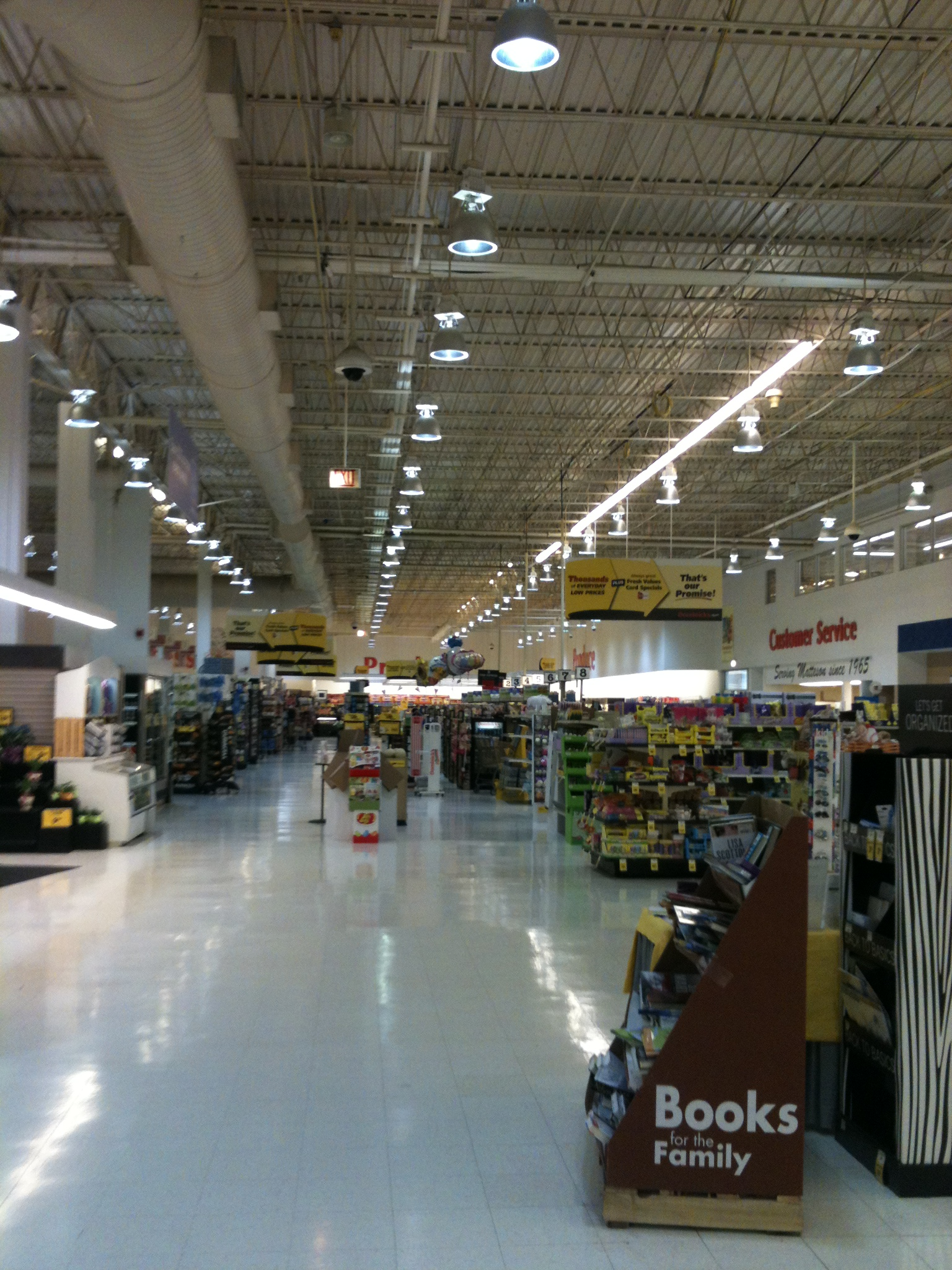
Dominick's Matteson, IL View of Front Checkout area of Store (2012)

In the 1980s and early 1990s, under the direction of Bob Mariano, Dominick's experimented with new large "food and drug" combo stores. Dominick's was one of the first to experiment with all ceiling sales areas, exposed structural elements such as piping and HVAC ducts, large-scale state-of-the-art telephone systems and POS systems, video departments, one-hour photo, bulk foods, and many other "new" 1980s concepts. This design carried over to the Omni Superstore Division of Dominick's.

Between early 1985 and 1988, Dominick's food and drug combo stores contained a full glass front wall that overlooked the parking lot with a customer service desk in the middle of the glass wall. Between 1988 and 1993, Dominick's stores contained a 2-story area (similar to its sister format Omni Superstore) at the front of the store. The first floor contained the customer service desk area, entry/exit vestibules, the security room, the video department, and a bank. The 2nd level contained a break room, employee restrooms, office area, and windows that overlooked the sales floor. After 1993 and the introduction of the Dominick's Fresh Stores, the design was switched back to a single-level store throughout.

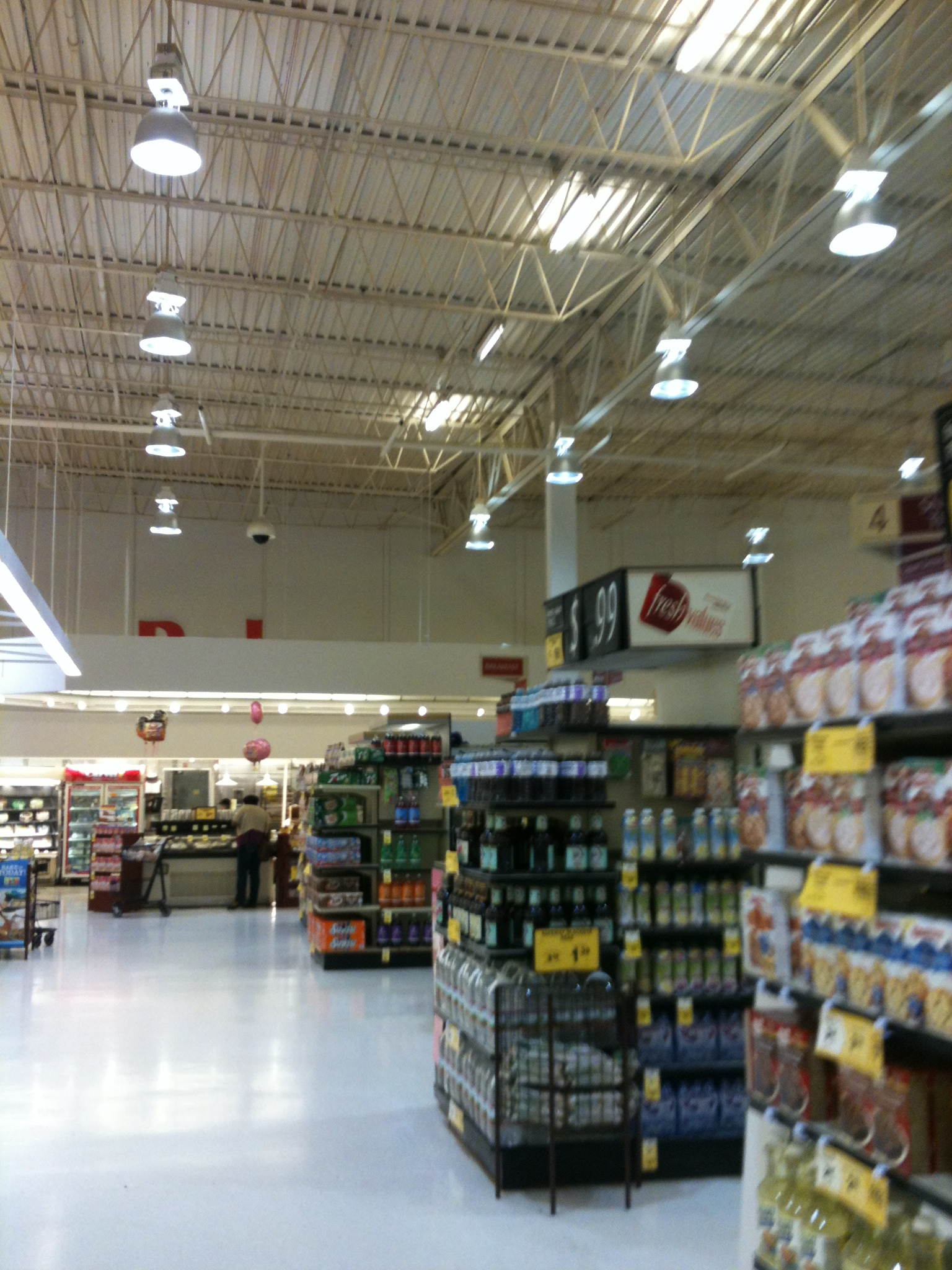
Dominick's Matteson, IL View towards Bakery (2012)

In the 1990s, Dominick's took the "food and drug" combo to the next level with the introduction of the Dominick's Fresh Store in 1993. The Dominick's "Fresh Store" introduced prepared foods, in-store restaurants/cafés, Starbucks cafés, soft lighting, upscale subtle graphics, uniform products signage, and a general European Market feel to the Dominick's stores. During the late 1990s, the Fresh Stores were the main expansion model for Dominick's and was rolled out to all new stores including former Omni Superstores, up until the purchase by Safeway.

Safeway bought Dominick's in 1998 and put an abrupt halt to the Fresh Stores, instead rolling out their own prototype with the Fresh Store logo on the outside of the store. Safeway still put "The Fresh Store" cursive logo on the outside of the stores, and in many stores, the Fresh Store concepts such as cafés, fresh prepared foods and European store layout format were discontinued in favor of Safeway's national store model. Safeway implemented its own store layouts as stores were remodeled, and their own house brands such as Safeway Select.

In 2005, the Safeway Lifestyle Store concept was brought to the Dominick's brand and in turn, many stores were remodeled with many of the same elements that Bob Mariano (the CEO of Dominick's during the Safeway takeover) had instituted prior to Safeway's acquisition but were in turn removed in 1998 by Safeway. Items such as hot prepared foods, salad bars, localized merchandise, and enhanced customer service, once removed by Safeway, were put back into service to try to win back the Chicago consumer. Mariano, the CEO of Roundy's Mariano's (as of 2016), expanded under the Mariano's banner and put pressure onto the Dominick's stores, which eventually closed in late 2013.

=== 1990s: Takeovers ===
In 1993, Dominick DiMatteo, Jr. died from lung cancer. According to the local press, his daughters and son did not have the same passion for the supermarket business. There was corporate infighting that also contributed to the family selling the chain. It took three years before the company was sold to a Los Angeles-based grocery investment firm headed by Yucaipa Companies.

In 1998, the chain's then 116 stores were acquired by Safeway Inc. Safeway soon began to sell its own private-label brands at Dominick's locations, replacing Dominick's former private-label brands. According to a grocery business consultant, "Dominick’s focused on purchasing produce and meat on quality first, price second. Safeway did just the opposite." Dominick's lost market share and profits following the Safeway takeover. Safeway tried to imitate the model that had been successful in California, but Chicago's strong ethnic background did not mesh well with the California shopping experience. Between 2002 and 2007, Dominick's market share in the Chicago region declined from 24.4 percent to 14.5 percent (Jewel-Osco's 40.5 percent was the market's leader). Safeway unsuccessfully attempted to sell the Dominick's chain in 2003. Safeway then reported Dominick's financial information as a discontinued operation, but later, Safeway announced that it was retaining the chain.

After closing more than 20 stores since its acquisition, Safeway announced in February 2007 that it would close another 14 stores in the Chicago area and convert 20 existing stores to the lifestyle format. After these store closings, Dominick's operated in 83 locations until they were closed on December 28, 2013.

== Omni Superstore ==
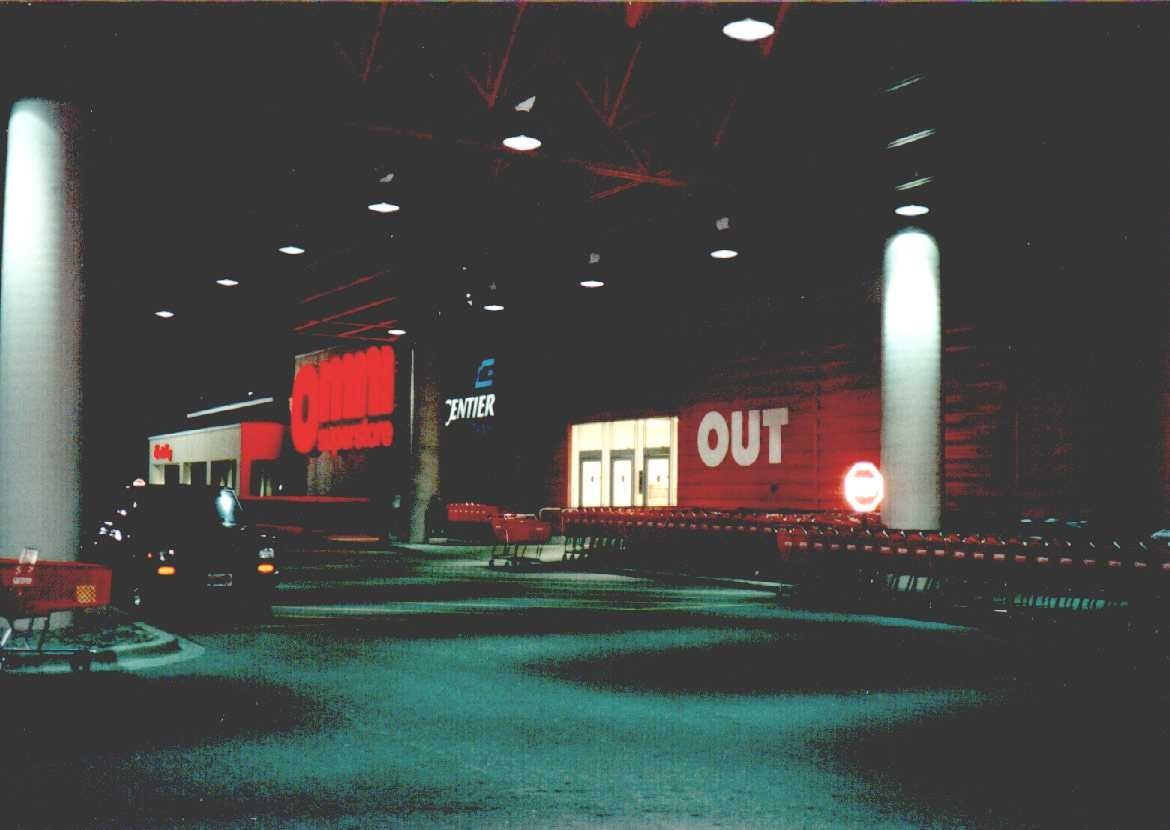
Omni Superstore, Schererville, Indiana, 1991: canopy for loading groceries

In 1987, the chain opened Omni Superstore locations, which were "warehouse-style" supermarkets to stave off Cub Foods supermarkets. Besides traditional food items, these stores featured non-food items, movie rental stores, and bulk items. The stores' design was stark in comparison to Dominick's and featured cost-cutting techniques.

These stores began to lose money due to lack of loss prevention and throwaway inventorying. Around 1996 then-owner Yucaipa decided to convert them to the Dominick's "Fresh Store" concept. Omni Superstores were converted to Dominick's Stores in 1997.

After Dominick's was acquired by Safeway, some locations were closed. The Clybourn Avenue Dominick's in Chicago was the only remaining Omni Superstore building which was occupied by Dominick's until the store closed on December 28, 2013.

== Brands ==
Dominick's had their store brand of Heritage House.

After being acquired by Safeway, Dominick's private-label brands varied between those branded for Safeway (such as "Safeway Select" and "O Organics") and ones branded for Dominick's.

=== Lifestyle branding ===
On April 18, 2005, Safeway, Dominick's parent company, began a $100 million (~$154 million in 2024) brand re-positioning campaign labeled "Ingredients for Life". Although the campaign was used in the Chicago area, the "Ingredients for Life" slogan was still positioned with the store's logo as in Safeway's other divisions (i.e. at the end of commercials and on billboards Dominick's logo was flashed combined with the slogan). Under this campaign many Dominick's were remodeled to the new format. Lifestyle stores featured more upscale trends than on Dominick's last re-branding, "Fresh Stores", such as an olive bar, carving station, Starbucks, and a salad bar. Architectural changes included hardwood flooring and new direct lighting schemes that tend to be less abrasive. The first Dominick's to be branded a Lifestyle store was in Northfield which opened after closing 12 poorly performing stores. Safeway later spent an additional $150 million in upgrades to the Lifestyle brand.

=== Banking ===
After seeing the success that their Omni division had with their in-store banking partnership with St. Paul Federal Bank since 1988, Dominick's formed an agreement with First Chicago Corp. in 1993. Until final closure in 2013, many Dominick's featured in-store bank locations and ATMs of First Chicago's successor, Chase.

== Sales of expired food ==
On February 17, 2011, CBS Chicago News featured a report, picked up from Chicago based blogger Jill Cataldo, about a widespread issue with the sale of expired products in Dominick's stores. Several Dominick's customers had reportedly been contacting Dominick's about these issues for some time but to no avail. On February 10th and February 15th, Cataldo, along with two of her readers, made two separate shopping trips to two different Dominick's store locations, during which they documented a total of over 700 expired items on the store shelves, some more than 2 years past their printed expiration dates.

On February 18, The Chicago Tribune also featured an article on Cataldo's findings and Dominick's expired food issue. In that article, Safeway, as parent company of Dominick's, released the following statement to the media: “Dominick’s customers rightly expect they will find only high-quality, fresh products at all of our stores. Our organization is committed to meeting those expectations. While expiration dates on food products are largely based on quality, not food safety, that does not diminish the fact that we are displeased with the out-of-date products found at our stores. This is not indicative of how we do business. A high-level and highest-priority team has been assembled to immediately address these issues.”

Various other Chicago-area media outlets also ran reports on this problem, including NBC Chicago, WGN Morning News, and WBBM AM Radio.

Even in years prior, customers had frequently taken to Dominick's Facebook page demanding answers about the volume of expired products on their shelves, but Dominick's remained silent on the issue prior to Cataldo's blog posts and the subsequent media coverage. Dominick's employees were seen in the stores "scouring shelves" and filling carts with expired products shortly thereafter as well.

== Store closings ==
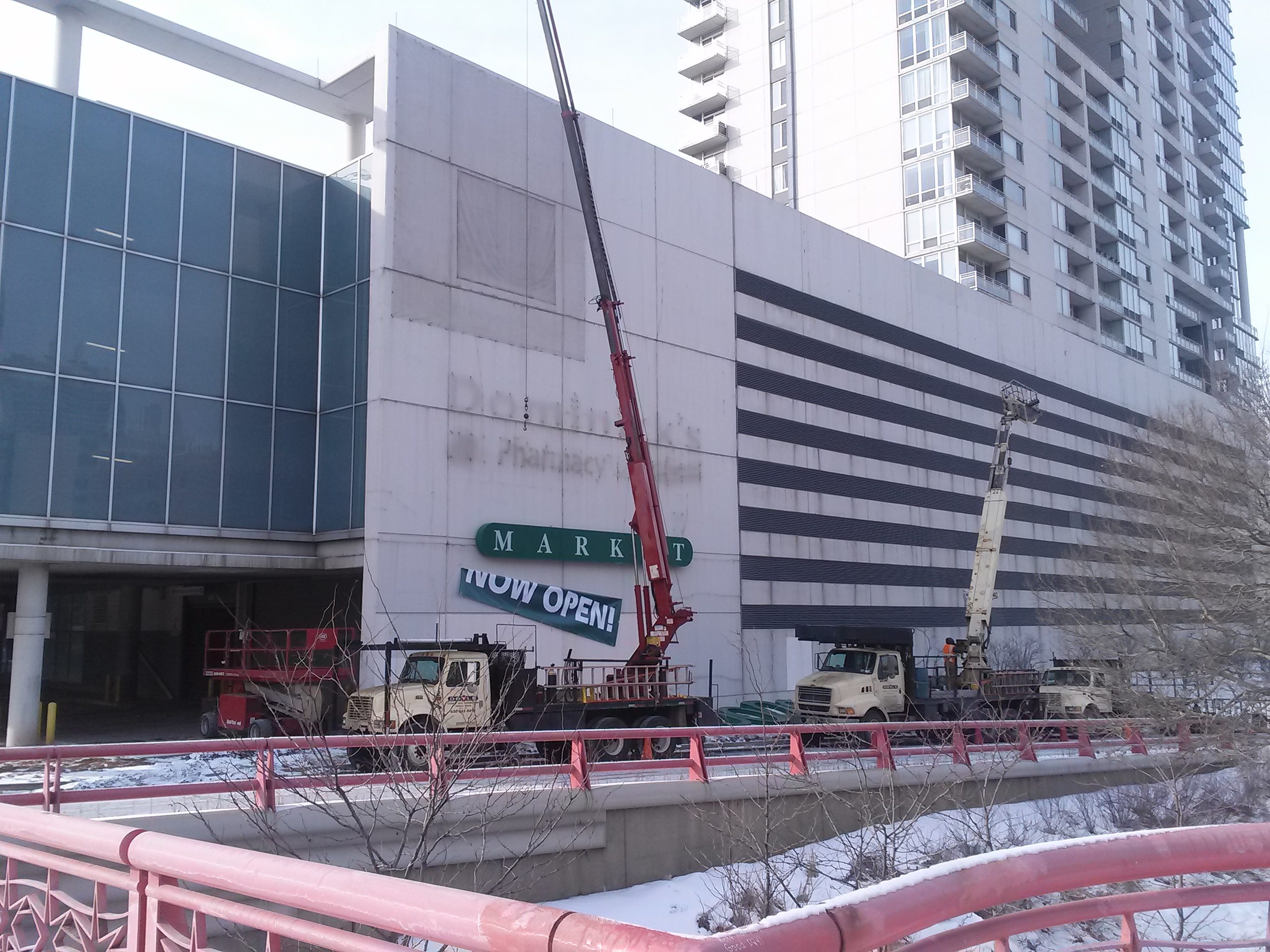
The site of a former Dominick's

Over time, Dominick's closed stores due to lack of sales and overall poor performance. In 2011, three locations were closed in Orland Park, Oak Lawn, and Carpentersville. In 2012, stores were closed in Hoffman Estates, Vernon Hills, Lake Bluff and Bloomingdale. Most employees were either transferred to different stores or offered a severance package.

It was announced that most Dominick's stores would be closed in the Chicago area by December 28, 2013. The announcement spurred its competitors into seeking out employees and store locations that they could expand into once Dominick's exits the market. On December 2, 2013, Milwaukee-based Roundy's, which operates under the Mariano's Fresh Market brand in the Chicago market and is chaired by former Dominick's CEO Bob Mariano, announced the purchase of eleven stores in the chain, though employees would have to re-apply to work for Roundy's. Most former Dominick's locations purchased by Roundy's were demolished and a new building rebuilt on site.

In December 2013, Dominick's employee Steve Yamamoto was suspended one day prior to his store closure date for having published a satirical, science-fiction themed video on the closure.

One location remained open in Bannockburn, Illinois until January 25, 2014, and another in Westchester, Illinois, until January 28, marking the end of the Dominick’s name after 95 years. Whole Foods purchased 7 of the closed locations in 2014.

In 2015, Safeway was acquired by Albertsons, the parent company of Jewel-Osco. Most of Dominick's brands were incorporated into Jewel as a result.

== Michael Jordan lawsuit ==
In 2009, Chicago Bulls legend Michael Jordan was inducted into the Hall of Fame. Dominick's used Jordan's image without his permission for a steak coupon. Jordan sued Dominick's for the unauthorized use of his image, and Safeway was ordered to pay him $8.9 million in damages.
