= Grosberg =

Grosberg may refer to:

- Joseph E. Grosberg (1883–1970), American businessman
- Lassor H. Grosberg (1923–1976), American theatre producer of An Inspector Calls
- Michael Grosberg, American travel author for the Lonely Planet travel guide publisher
- Mildred Grosberg Bellin (1908–2008), American cookbook author

== See also ==
- Grossberg (disambiguation)
- Grasberg
