= Acme Fresh Market =

Grocery store chain in Ohio, United States

The Fred W. Albrecht Grocery Company
- Trade name: Acme Fresh Market
- Type: Private
- Industry: Retail (Grocery)
- Founded: 1891; 135 years ago
- Founder: Frederick Wilhelm Albrecht
- Headquarters: Akron, Ohio, U.S.
- Number of locations: 15
- Area served: Northeast Ohio
- Key people: Jim Trout (President); Nick Albrecht (Executive Vice President)
- Products: Grocery; pharmacy; dairy; frozen; organic; produce; deli; meat; bakery; floral; alcohol; general merchandise
- Revenue: US$9.5 billion (2020)
- Owner: Jim Trout
- Number of employees: 1,485 (2020)
- Website: www.acmestores.com

The Fred W. Albrecht Grocery Company, under the trade name Acme Fresh Market, is a grocery store chain based in Akron, Ohio, that has 15 locations in Summit, Portage, Stark, and Medina counties of Northeast Ohio. It was established in 1891.

== History ==
Frederick Wilhelm Albrecht, a native of Massillon, Ohio, started in the grocery business when he gained control of his brother's local store. In 1891, he opened his own store in Akron, called F.W. Albrecht Grocery Company. After visiting an Acme store in Philadelphia (currently, a supermarket chain owned by Albertsons), Albrecht soon renamed his small corner grocery store "Acme". He also changed his business to conduct cash-only sales. More "Acme Cash Stores" soon opened around the Akron area, reaching 40 locations by 1918. After ceasing home-delivery operations, Albrecht renamed his stores once again to "Acme Cash Basket Stores". Acme grew to over 100 stores, both large and small, by the 1930s.

The Great Depression and World War II brought a decline in consumer behavior and caused Acme to halt its expansion. Following the war, Acme began to experiment in the Supermarket business, opening their first such location in 1952. In 1966, the 75th anniversary of the business, the last of the small corner stores was closed.

In 1965, Acme opened a subsidiary retail chain called Click. The Click stores were department stores with a full-sized Acme grocery store under one roof. The first Acme-Click store was in Stow (later became Fresh Market #17). In the 1970s, Acme joined with Youngfellow Pharmacy to open Y-Mart stores, a chain of pharmacy/convenience stores similar to Walgreens. After new competition entered the area, the Click stores were renamed Acme Super Centers in the early 1990s. The Y-Mart stores were renamed Acme Express in 1996. At the end of the 1990s, the Super Centers and Express stores were closed. Some of the Super Centers were converted into Acme Fresh Markets, while others were sold. The Acme Express stores were sold to CVS/pharmacy in 1998. This was part of the company's effort to downsize and re-brand the remaining stores as Acme Fresh Market.

After the loss of their local Acme store in 1997, residents in West Akron rallied for a new supermarket to move in. Henry Johnson, a longtime Acme employee, worked with Acme and the city to open a new grocery store. Henry's Acme, the company's first and only franchise location, opened in 2000. Following a decline in business, as well as new competition in the area, the store closed its doors in 2014.

There are currently fifteen Acme Fresh Market stores, and one RSVP Food and Party Outlet location.

== Expansion and renovation ==
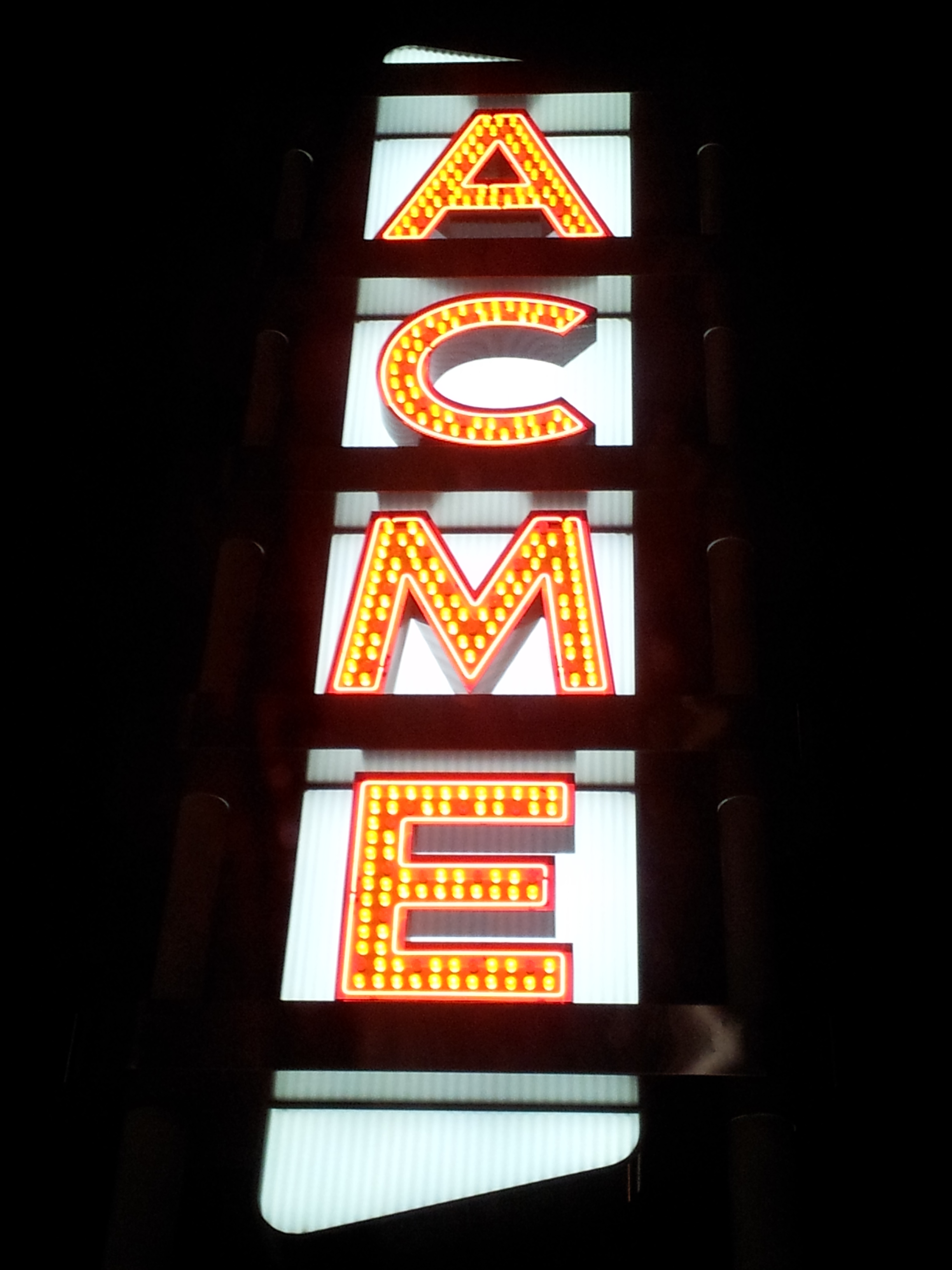
This Acme sign, built in the 1950s, was renovated for the new Acme #10 after many years in storage.

As the company moved away from non-food items and into the Fresh Market branding, many of the stores were remodeled and renovated. From the mid-2000s to the present, many of the older stores have undergone various renovations. These projects were to help modernize the facilities and to streamline and improve customer experience.

In 2006, one of Acme's competitors, Tops Markets, announced it was leaving Northeast Ohio and needed to sell off its 46 stores. Eight of these locations were in the Akron area, some of which originally operated as Finast. Acme President Steven T. Albrecht indicated to the Akron Beacon Journal that the company was going to "review the Tops Stores" to see if any "fit Acme's goals". Acme No. 11, located in Tallmadge, relocated to one of these former Tops stores across the street in 2007. Later that year, Acme purchased another Tops location in Parma, Ohio, which had been empty for one year. The new store opened on May 3, 2008 as Acme No. 20.

The company continued its renovation efforts in the late 2000s, with the Bailey Road, Ellet, Kenmore, Kent, and Stow locations receiving major overhauls. In November 2009, Acme opened a pharmacy inside the Akron General Health and Wellness Center in Stow. The pharmacy, designated Acme No. 30, has since closed.

In 2013, Acme completely rebuilt the store on State Road in Cuyahoga Falls. The aging neighborhood store, nearly 60 years old, was ultimately replaced with a larger building featuring a nostalgic 1950s-style facade. In addition, the original Acme street sign, which stood outside the store from the 1940s to the mid-2000s, has been fully restored and reinstalled.

In 2014, Acme opened a brand new store in Green, Ohio. The 68,800 square foot store was the first new Acme facility to be built since 1990.

Albrecht, Inc., Acme's realtor, owns land in Medina, Ohio, and has plans for a five-building shopping center anchored by a 68,000 square-foot Acme store. The Medina store opened on August 7, 2025.

On December 1, 2025, Acme closed the Parma store because of financial problems. The RSVP Food & Party Outlet in Stow followed in January, 2026 for the same reason. The adjacent Stow Acme store also closed due to financial issues in May, 2026.

== Walk-in clinic ==
In 2006, several stores introduced QuickClinics. These small clinics offered patients exams and healthcare with a nurse practitioner. Two years later, ownership of the clinics switched to Akron General.

The clinics were shut down in 2010, before changing hands and reopening one year later under the "ExpressCare Clinic" brand. Currently, the clinics are located at Acme No. 2, 14, and 17.

== Alcohol sales ==
Acme stores have a wide variety of wine and beer. Seven locations also have State Liquor licenses. In 2011, Acme started the "Mix-a-Six" program in the beer aisle. This is an empty six-pack carrier that customers can fill with six bottles from a selection of craft beers. Later that same year, Acme introduced Growler stations at some of its stores. These stations feature several craft beers on tap, which are dispensed into customer-purchased Acme beer jugs.
