= Northeast Grocery =

American supermarket company

- Type: Private
- Predecessors: Price Chopper and Tops Friendly Markets
- Founded: 2021
- Headquarters: Schenectady, New York, United States
- Key people: John Persons (CEO)
- Subsidiaries: Price Chopper Supermarkets; Tops Friendly Markets
- Website: www.northeastgrocery.com

Northeast Grocery is the parent company of Tops Friendly Markets, Price Chopper and Market 32. The company was formed after a merger in 2021 which gives the company nearly 300 stores in the northeast United States.

== History ==
On February 8, 2021, Price Chopper and Tops announced plans to merge. The new parent company would be headquartered in Schenectady, New York, while Price Chopper and Tops would retain their primary offices in Schenectady and Williamsville, respectively. Both banners were expected to continue operating with local management under the new corporate structure.

As a condition of regulatory approval, the FTC required the divestiture of 12 stores. These stores were sold to C&S Wholesale Grocers with most reopening under the Grand Union banner. Most of these stores have since closed.

The merger was completed nine months later, the merger was completed forming Northeast Grocery as the parent company overseeing both chains. Price Chopper President and CEO Scott Grimmett remained in place to guide the integration before retiring in February 2022. Leadership subsequently transitioned to Tops Friendly Markets CEO Frank Curci.
