= WTAC =

WTAC may refer to:

- WTAC (FM) 89.7, a radio station in Burton, Michigan, United States
- WTAC-TV channel 16, a defunct television station in Flint, Michigan, United States
- WSNL 600 AM, a radio station in Flint, Michigan, United States that previously held the WTAC call sign
- WTAC (Pennsylvania) a Johnstown AM radio station from 1922 to 1926
