= Schaffer Stores Company =

Grocery chain in New York, US

Schaffer Stores Company was a small grocery chain store based in Schenectady, New York. The business gained valuable experience by running a self-service grocery store beginning in 1929. Schaffer's first supermarket, called Empire Market, opened in 1933.

== Foundation, expansion ==
The business was founded by Henry Schaffer (1890 - December 16, 1982). A native of Poland who came to Schenectady in his youth, he lived in Schenectady at the time of his death from leukemia.

Schaffer formed Schaffer Stores Company in 1907. He operated 31 stores by 1922. In 25 years the firm grew to include 185 stores in the Hudson Valley, Mohawk Valley, and western Massachusetts.

== Buy out ==
The chain was acquired by Grand Union (supermarket) in June 1958 for approximately $8 million. Grand Union, based in East Paterson, New Jersey, operated 472 supermarkets. At the time, Schaffer ran 41 grocery stores, the majority of which were supermarkets.
