= Pick 'n Pay =

Pick n Pay may refer to:

- Pick-N-Pay Supermarkets, a chain of groceries that operated in Ohio
- Pick n Pay Stores, a grocery store chain in South Africa
- Pick n Pay Hypermarket, supermarkets in South Africa
