= Quality Markets =

American supermarket chain

- Company type: Subsidiary of Tops Markets LLC
- Industry: Retail (Grocery)
- Founded: 1913
- Defunct: August 2010
- Headquarters: Williamsville, New York (headquarters) locations = 26 Stores
- Products: Bakery, dairy, deli, frozen foods, general grocery, meat, pharmacy, produce, seafood, snacks
- Website: www.topsmarkets.com

Quality Markets was an American supermarket chain, with stores in Western New York and northwestern Pennsylvania. It was a subsidiary of Penn Traffic, but is now a division of Tops Markets LLC.

== History ==
The first Quality Markets store opened in Jamestown, New York in 1913, and spread into Pennsylvania by the 1930s. They became a subsidiary of Penn Traffic in 1979. They opened their first stores in Buffalo, New York in 1993.

According to their website, they were the first chain store in Western New York to use barcode scanners at the checkout.

After the parent company's third bankruptcy and sale to Tops Markets LLC, Quality stores were converted to Tops by the end of August 2010, along with sister stores P&C and BiLo/Riverside.

== Litigation ==
For much of the mid-to-late 1990s, Quality Markets was embroiled in antitrust litigation with its eventual successor, Tops Markets. The lawsuit against Quality was based on allegations that they conspired with a local developer to prevent Tops from entering the local Jamestown market.
