= Mildred Grosberg Bellin =

American cookbook author

- Mildred Grosberg, from the 1928 yearbook of Smith College
- Born: September 7, 1908; Schenectady, New York, United States
- Died: February 15, 2008 (aged 99); Tulsa, Oklahoma, United States
- Spouse: Dr. Harold Bellin
- Relatives: Joseph E. Grosberg (father), Rachel Grosberg (mother)
- Writing career
- Period: Mid-20th Century
- Genre: Cookbooks
- Notable works: The Jewish Cookbook (1941, 1958, 1983); Modern Jewish Meals (1934, 1952)

Mildred Grosberg Bellin (September 7, 1908 – February 15, 2008) was an American cookbook author. She is most noted for her influential cookbooks Modern Jewish Meals and The Jewish Cookbook, which brought modern nutritional ideas into Jewish cooking.

== Biography ==
Mildred Grosberg was born and raised in Schenectady, New York. Her father was Joseph E. Grosberg, a grocery industry pioneer and one of the founders of what later became the Price Chopper grocery chain. She attended Smith College, from which she graduated in 1928 and where she was elected to Phi Beta Kappa. After graduation she directed meal-planning clubs and cooking classes at the Jewish Community Center in Albany, New York, and married Dr. Harold Bellin, an Albany physician. In the 1930s, she wrote Modern Kosher Meals, which in later editions was renamed Modern Jewish Meals. This menu-planning cookbook was marketed as "first aid" for presenting "modern, economical, palatable, scientifically prepared Kosher food." Bellin's publisher, Bloch Publishing Company of New York, claimed that the book sold more than 90,000 copies.

In his early book, Aller Retour New York, Henry Miller mentions seeing Modern Kosher Meals in a bookstore he called the "National Jewish Book Concern" on 31st Street in New York City, citing it (and other Jewish-interest books) in a disparaging fashion as evidence of the growing Jewish influence that he said was taking over New York.

Riding on the success of Modern Jewish Meals, she then took on the task of updating an older classic, The International Jewish Cookbook, originally written by Florence Kreisler Greenbaum for Bloch Publishing and published in 1918. Over time, Bellin expanded, revised, and modernized the book, until, in its 1958 edition, it contained more than 3,000 recipes, both traditional and non-traditional, taken from all parts of the Jewish world and from other cultures as well, adjusted both for the laws of Kashrut and for the requirements of the “modern” kitchen. Bellin wrote that "Jewish cooking in its fullest sense, is international cooking based on the dietary laws," and she made an effort to combine the nutritional ideas of her day with the traditional foods of the Jewish kitchen. In a 1967 essay, Cynthia Ozick focused on The Jewish Cookbook as an exemplar of kosher cookbooks, describing it as "a well-organized volume with a good index and a dizzily cosmopolitan glossary including both pupick and zabaglione."

Bellin also published columns on Jewish cooking in Gourmet Magazine and a syndicated column for the Jewish Telegraphic Agency and various Jewish newspapers. After Dr. Bellin's death in 1970, she moved to Tulsa, Oklahoma, where she lived until her death in 2008 at the age of 99.

The Jewish Cookbook underwent minor revisions and was reissued again in 1983 under the title The Original Jewish Cookbook. It remains available from Bloch Publishing and continues to be an authority for traditional and non-traditional Jewish recipes. Bellin's books were discussed in the catalog for the Jewish Museum’s 1990 exhibition “Getting Comfortable in New York,” and Modern Jewish Meals was included in a 2006 exhibition on Jewish foodways at the National Museum of American Jewish History in Philadelphia.

== Cookbooks ==
- Bellin, Mildred Grosberg, Modern Kosher Meals: recipes and menus arranged for each month of the year based on current food supplies, New York, Bloch Publishing Company, 1934 (subsequently reissued as Modern Jewish Meals), rev. ed. 1952
- Bellin, Mildred Grosberg, The Jewish Cook Book, New York, Bloch Publishing Company, 1941, rev. ed. 1958
- Bellin, Mildred Grosberg, The Original Jewish Cookbook New York, Bloch Publishing Company, 1983, ISBN 0-8197-0058-4

Listing at Bloch Publishing Company official website
Listing at Amazon.com
