= Grossberg =

Grossberg may refer to:

- Carl Grossberg (1894-1940), German painter
- Lawrence Grossberg (born 1947), American academic
- Ned Grossberg, fictional character from the Max Headroom series
- Rami Grossberg, American mathematician
- Stephen Grossberg, American scientist
- Amy Grossberg and Brian Peterson, American couple convicted of manslaughter

== See also ==
- Grosberg (disambiguation)
