= Finast =

Defunct American supermarket chain

First National Supermarkets, Inc. First National Stores Finast
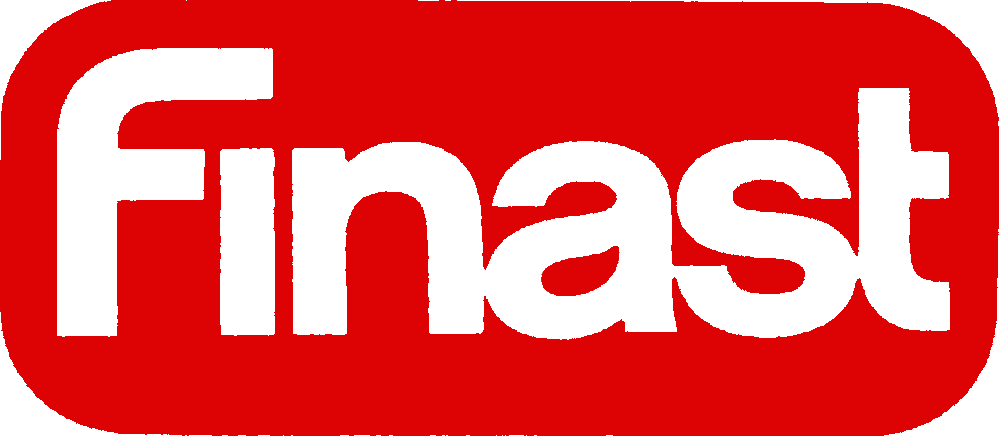

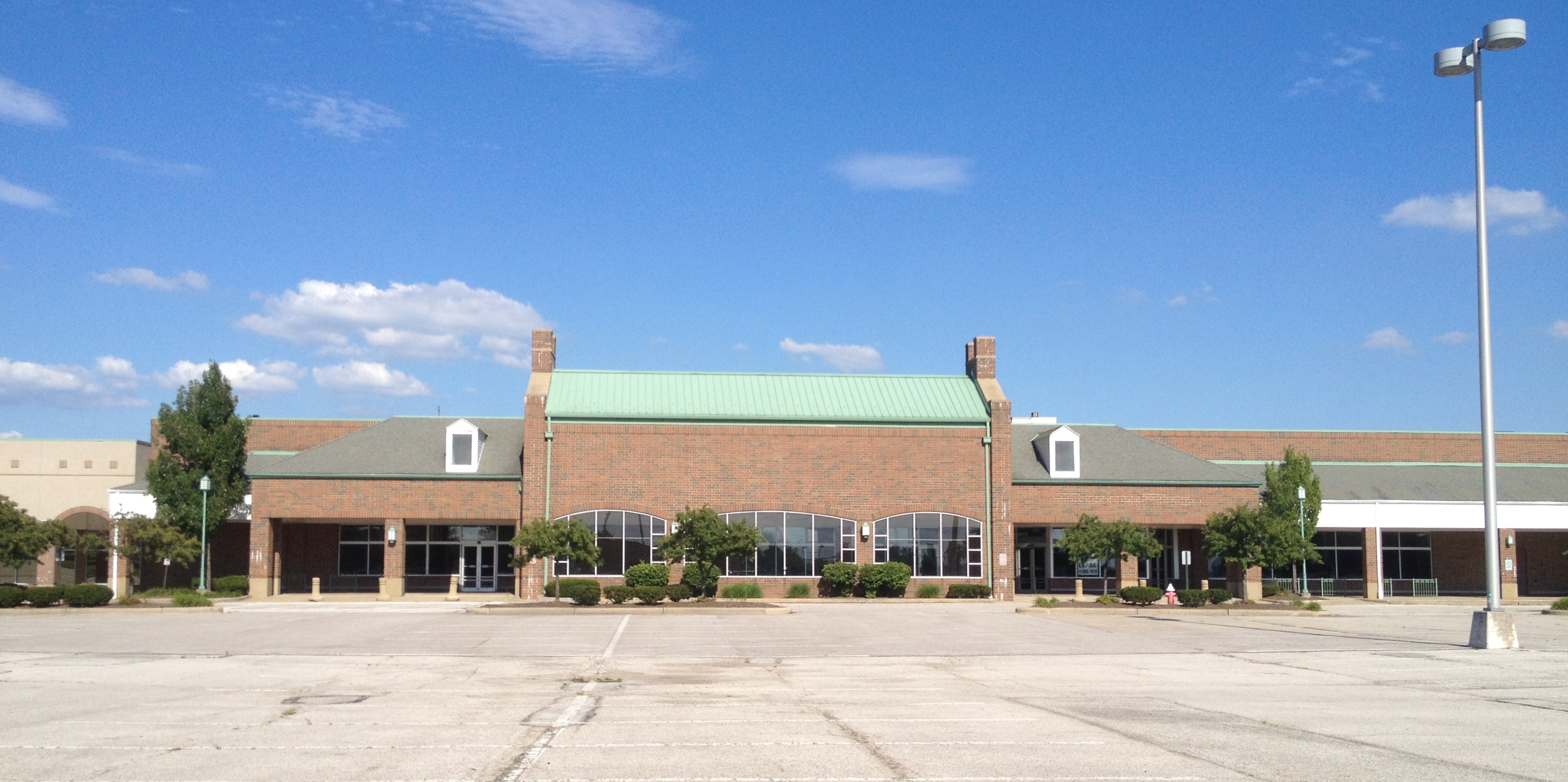
- A former Finast at Meadowbrook Market Square in Bedford, Ohio
- Type: Subsidiary
- Industry: Retail
- Founded: 1853
- Defunct: 1993 (as stores); 1996 (as a store brand)
- Fate: Acquired by Pick-N-Pay Supermarkets and later Ahold; Converted stores to Pick-N-Pay, Edwards and Tops Friendly Markets; Finast store brand phased out later on
- Headquarters: Somerville, Massachusetts (original); Maple Heights, Ohio (later)
- Key people: Michael O'Keeffe (co-founder and first president)
- Products: Grocery
- Parent: Ahold

Finast was a retail supermarket brand that started in the northeastern United States, with headquarters in Somerville, Massachusetts. Finast was a syllabic abbreviation for "First National Stores." Commonly referred to as "The First National", the stores operated under the First National name for decades, while the Finast acronym was reserved for its store-brand products. Several years later, most of its stores were renamed Finast during a modernization effort.

Finast was incorporated as a merger between three regional chains: M. O'Keeffe's, Inc., the John T. Connor Company, and the Ginter Company. The merger occurred on December 28, 1925, and First National Stores was incorporated. M. O'Keeffe's was the largest of the three companies with 330 outlets in 1922, in comparison with 307 Connor stores and 150 Ginter stores that same year. By the time of the 1925 merger, there were 650 M. O’Keeffe stores throughout New England. Initially concentrated in the Boston area, the chain expanded throughout New England and entered New York and New Jersey. It purchased the Safeway stores in New York City metropolitan area in 1961.

The co-founder and first president of First National Stores was Michael O'Keeffe, an immigrant from County Clare, Ireland. His son Arthur O'Keeffe would go onto succeed him as president in 1933, who would later be succeeded by Arthur's brother Adrian O'Keeffe.

The company was purchased by Pick-N-Pay Supermarkets of northeast Ohio in 1978, and the regional headquarters for New England and New York were moved to the distribution center in Windsor Locks, Connecticut, while corporate headquarters were moved to Maple Heights, Ohio. Pick-N-Pay began rebranding the Northeast stores under the Edwards Super Food Store brand. Pick-N-Pay changed its corporate name to First National Supermarkets, Inc. and began rebranding its Pick-N-Pay stores to Finast stores.

Logo used from 1964 to 1982

One of the largest Finast supermarkets was located in the Cross County Shopping Center in Yonkers, New York. One of the features, as with a few other Finast stores, was the conveyor belt system that allowed customers to drive up to the side of the store and get their grocery bags placed into their cars for convenience.

The Dutch retail food conglomerate Ahold, which had entered the U.S. through its purchase of Bi-Lo Supermarkets in the Southeastern U.S. in 1977, purchased Finast in 1988. Ahold completed the process of converting the last Pick-N-Pay stores to Finast in 1994.

After purchasing the Stop & Shop grocery chain in 1996, Ahold rebranded most of the Edwards stores to Stop & Shop, while divesting the rest because the FTC required the divestiture of approximately 20 stores as part of the acquisition. The remaining Midwest Finast stores were rebranded as Tops Friendly Markets, Ahold's Buffalo, New York–based unit at the time. Ahold continued to use the Finast brand on its private-label products in its grocery chains, including Giant-Carlisle. The company eventually phased out the Finast brand in favor of products matching each chain's name.
