= WTAC (Pennsylvania) =

Radio station in Johnstown, Pennsylvania (1922–1926)

WTAC was the first radio broadcasting station in Johnstown, Pennsylvania. Owned by the Penn Traffic Company, it was first licensed in November 1922, and deleted in early 1926.

== History ==
WTAC's first license was issued on November 23, 1922, to the Penn Traffic Company of Johnstown, Pennsylvania. The department store would remain the station's owner throughout its existence. In the summer of 1923, WTAC's schedule was listed as "Daily ex Sun 10:15 am, 2:15 pm, Tues, Thurs 7:30 pm".

The initial license specified operation on the standard "entertainment" wavelength of 360 meters (833 kHz). In mid 1924 the station was reassigned to 1090 kHz, and early the next year it moved to 1430 kHz. Later that year the station is listed on 1120 kHz.

WTAC was deleted in early 1926.
