= Pick-N-Pay Supermarkets =

Supermarket chain in Ohio, United States

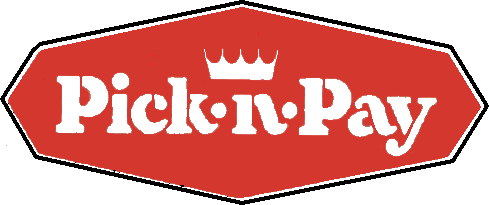
- Type: Subsidiary
- Industry: Retail
- Founded: 1928
- Fate: Acquired by Ahold
- Headquarters: Cleveland, Ohio, United States
- Products: Grocery
- Parent: Ahold

Pick-N-Pay Supermarkets was a chain of supermarkets which operated in the Greater Cleveland, Ohio area. The company's origin can be traced to the year 1928 and the opening of a small dairy store in Cleveland Heights, Ohio by Edward Silverberg who then expanded his operation and created a chain of such stores which he called Farmview Creamery Stores. In 1938, Mr. Silverberg opened a supermarket on E. 185th Street which he called Pick-N-Pay. In 1940, he changed the name of all his stores to Pick-N-Pay Supermarkets. He grew the chain to a total of 10 stores and in 1951 sold the company to Cook Coffee Company (later, as of 1969, Cook United, Inc.). Under Cook Coffee's ownership, the chain continued to grow through expansion and through Pick-N-Pay's acquisition of the Foodtown supermarkets in 1959. In 1972, it was sold to a group of private investors led by Julius Kravitz (previously the head of Foodtown), who continued the use of the brand for the newly independent company. Principal competitors in the Greater Cleveland market were the Fisher-Fazio-Costa, Stop-N-Shop, and Heinen's grocery chains.

During the company's heyday, shoppers at Pick-N-Pay stores were attracted by the stores' emphasis on higher-end meats and produce. The stores also participated in the Eagle Stamp (green stamps) trading stamp program, a project of the May Company of Cleveland. Shoppers would earn stamps at the time their orders were rung up based on the total retail dollar spent at the grocery. These stamps were then pasted into booklets, which, when "completed" (filled), were taken to a local May Company store, where they were redeemed for $3 vouchers towards May Company merchandise.

Employees of Pick-N-Pay worked under a union contract, like those of most other major Cleveland area grocers. While still under Cook United's ownership, the stores were often paired in shopping centers with Cook's and Uncle Bill's, discount department stores which were owned and operated by that company.

In 1978, Pick-N-Pay acquired First National Stores of Boston, Massachusetts and the name of the company was changed to First National Supermarkets, Inc. with corporate headquarters in Maple Heights, Ohio. While expansion was the goal, that plan was sidelined after Kravitz was murdered in 1979 in a botched kidnapping-for-ransom attempt. The entire chain including Pick-N-Pay, Edwards Food Warehouse (the company's entry in the then popular fewer-"frills"-mean-lower-prices style of operation), and Finast branded stores was subsequently purchased by Ahold (Koninklijke Ahold N.V.) of the Netherlands.
