= Price Chopper (Northeastern United States) =

American supermarket chain owned by Northeast Grocery

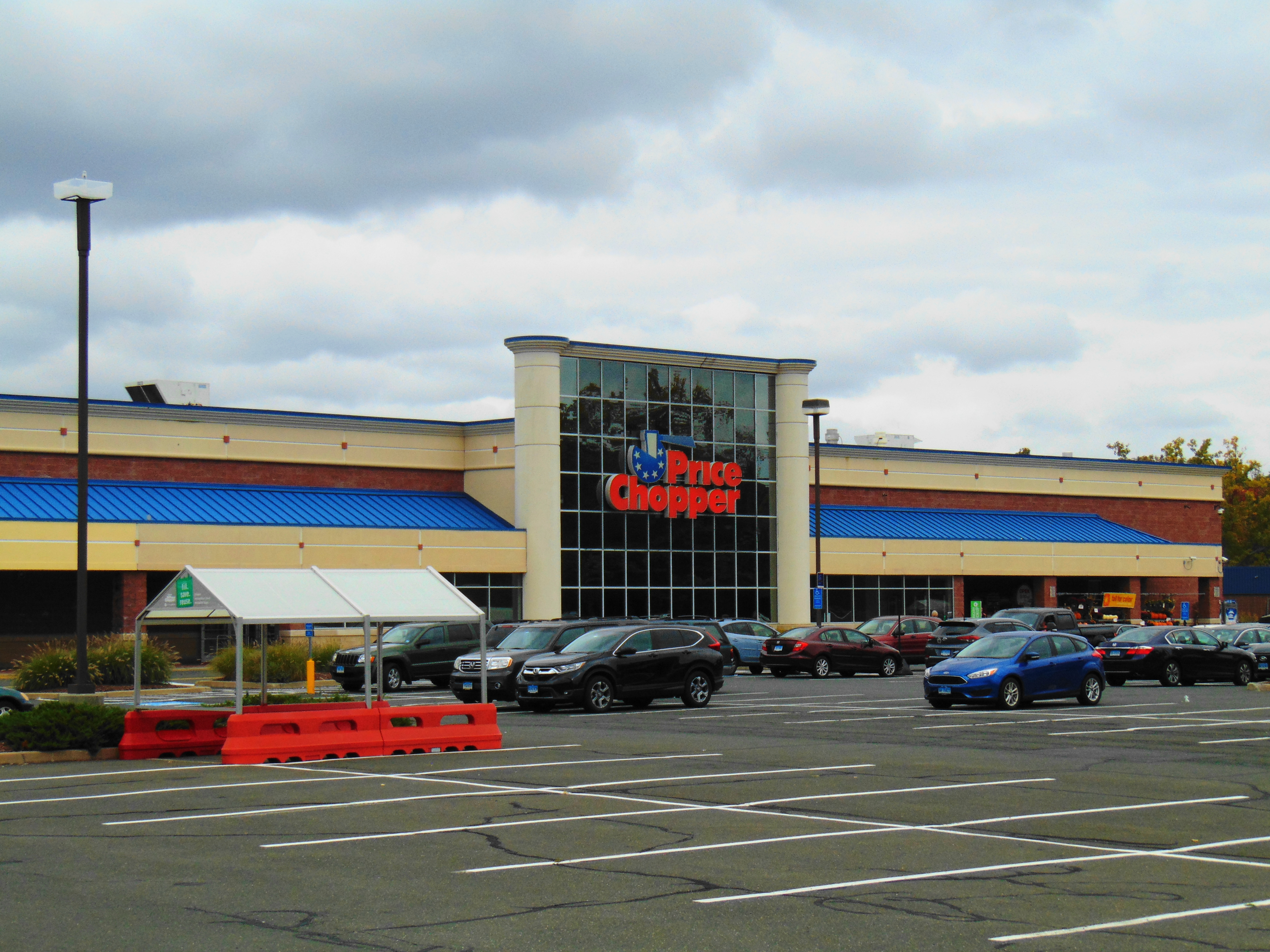
- Price Chopper store in Newington, Connecticut
- Trade name: Price Chopper; Market 32
- Type: Private
- Industry: Retail
- Founded: 1932 (Schenectady, New York; as "Central Market"); 1973 (as Price Chopper)
- Founder: William Golub; Bernard Golub
- Headquarters: Schenectady, New York, U.S.
- Number of locations: 128
- Area served: Upstate New York, Vermont, Connecticut, Massachusetts, New Hampshire, and Pennsylvania
- Products: Bakery, dairy, deli, frozen foods, floral, general grocery, meat, pharmacy, sushi, produce, seafood, snacks, liquor
- Revenue: ▲US$3.5 billion (2019)
- Net income: ▲$25.30 million (2019)
- Owner: Golub family (1932–2021); Northeast Grocery (2021–present)
- Number of employees: 24,000
- Website: www.pricechopper.com

Price Chopper Supermarkets is an American supermarket chain owned by Northeast Grocery, headquartered in Schenectady, New York. The chain opened its first supermarkets in New York's Capital District in 1932, and changed its name from Central Market to Price Chopper in 1973. It operates 128 stores in six states: Upstate New York, Vermont, Connecticut, Massachusetts, New Hampshire, and Pennsylvania. It operates stores under the Price Chopper, and Market 32 banners.

== History ==
=== 1920s to 1980s: Early years ===
In 1927, William Golub and his brother, Bernard, took over the wholesale grocery that their father, Lewis Golub, had opened in 1908 after emigrating from Russia. In 1932, Joseph E. Grosberg, together with Russian Jewish immigrants Bernard and William Golub, partners in the Grosberg-Golub Corporation, opened the partnership's first supermarket (initially called Public Service Market) in Green Island, New York, followed by stores in Cohoes, Watervliet and Schenectady. They gave all four stores the name Central Market.

The concept was a success and they continued to open many more stores in the region. In 1943, the Golub brothers bought out Joseph Grosberg's share of the company and formed the present parent company, the Golub Corporation. In 1951, it was one of the first grocery chains in the country to issue the well-known S&H Green Trading Stamps.

In the fall of 1973, Central Market changed its operating strategy. The chain dropped Green Stamps, slashed prices and, to reflect this new strategy, it re-branded to the name "Price Chopper." (The name "Central Market" is now used as an upscale house brand, as well as for the floral department.) Price Chopper experienced continuing growth throughout the 1970s, opening new stores and upgrading old ones.

=== 1980s–1990s: Store modernization and expansion ===
Price Chopper was an early innovator in the conversion of conventional stores to superstores and combination (food and drug) units, as well as operating stores that are open 24 hours a day. The first Price Chopper opened in the late 1970s in Oneonta, New York. Another opened in the early 1980s in Latham, New York, and then an even-larger unit was constructed in Queensbury, New York in 1986. The Super Centers, which were state-of-the-art by 1980s standards, often featured full-service meat, seafood, and bakery departments, as well as pharmacies and banks (features new to supermarkets at the time). These units were also known for their unconventional layouts, with aisles facing horizontally, or away from, the cash registers, rather than the traditional vertical arrangement with the aisles facing the cash register area. Few Price Chopper stores still retain this layout today. In the late 1980s, Price Chopper changed its corporate logo featuring an axe cutting into a coin.

In 1993, Price Chopper launched an updated version of the Super Center format with a South Hills Mall store in Poughkeepsie. (This store closed on July 15, 2006, and was converted into a ShopRite.) This was Price Chopper's first store in the Mid-Hudson Valley market. The updated concept had a greater emphasis on take-out and ready-to-eat meals, some featuring food courts with Price Chopper's own in-house branded concepts, including Roasters (rotisserie chicken; no relation to Kenny Rogers Roasters), Bella Roma (pizza), Coyote Joe's (tacos and burritos), and the Bagel Factory. Under the newer prototype, the aisles were also placed back in the traditional vertical arrangement at the request of many customers who found the former layout confusing.

=== 1990s–2000s: Expansion into New England ===
Prior to 1990, Price Chopper was barely a player in the New England states, with only about a half dozen outlets in Massachusetts and Vermont. The chain acquired the now-defunct Giant Value supermarkets during the late 1970s, which accounted for most of the New England locations at the time. However, beginning in the early 1990s, the chain began an aggressive expansion eastward into the New England region, primarily focusing on further growth in Vermont and Massachusetts. Today the chain operates about 40 stores throughout four of the New England states.

In 1990, Price Chopper acquired many stores in Vermont from Syracuse-based P&C Food Markets, which the Federal Trade Commission (FTC) was requiring it to sell because of its parent company's decision to increase its ownership stake in Grand Union. Throughout the 1990s, Price Chopper made an attempt to either modernize, expand, or construct replacement stores for many of the acquired P&C locations. Today, Price Chopper has a presence in most of Vermont's larger cities and towns.

In 1995, Price Chopper acquired the Wonder Market Companies' twelve Big D stores in the Worcester, Massachusetts area, rebranding them or replacing them with Price Chopper stores. In 2012, Price Chopper expanded its presence in this region by opening two new stores, in Hopkinton and Gardner. In addition to its store base in Central Massachusetts, Price Chopper also has three stores in the Berkshires, but there are no stores in the greater Springfield area or other towns in the Pioneer Valley despite being located between these two regions.

In 1999, Price Chopper opened its first New Hampshire store in West Lebanon, and in 2006, its second location, a 74,000-square-foot (6,900 m^{2}) Market Center—in Keene. A third location, in Lebanon in a former P&C Foods store, opened in 2009. Price Chopper opened its fourth New Hampshire store, also a former P&C Foods, in Lincoln in May 2010, expanding its footprint to the White Mountains.

In the 2010s, Price Chopper also expanded rapidly into Connecticut, primarily in the Hartford suburbs, where it now operates nine stores. During the grand opening of Windsor, Connecticut store #221, Price Chopper raised the most money in company history for its non-profit organization. In 2010, Price Chopper opened a store in Middletown. Another location opened in Storrs, near the main campus of UConn, on June 6, 2014.

In 2002, Price Chopper exited the convenience store business by leasing out its remaining convenience locations to Petroleum Marketing, a Getty operator. Price Chopper had attempted to enter the convenience store business during the 1980s by opening smaller stores, mostly with gas pumps but sometimes without, to utilize older, smaller storefronts where a larger store was not possible. They operated under the "Mini Chopper" trade name, still using the logo of an axe cutting into a coin. But they were largely unsuccessful.

In June 2009, Price Chopper established a three-year partnership with Sunoco for the company's "Fuel Advantage" program, where customers earned 10 cents off every gallon of gas for every 100 dollars spent on groceries. (It was formerly 50 dollars until the first renewal in 2012.) The partnership was renewed in May 2012 for another three years, and again in 2015.

=== 2009–present: Growing greener, Market Bistro, and Market 32 ===
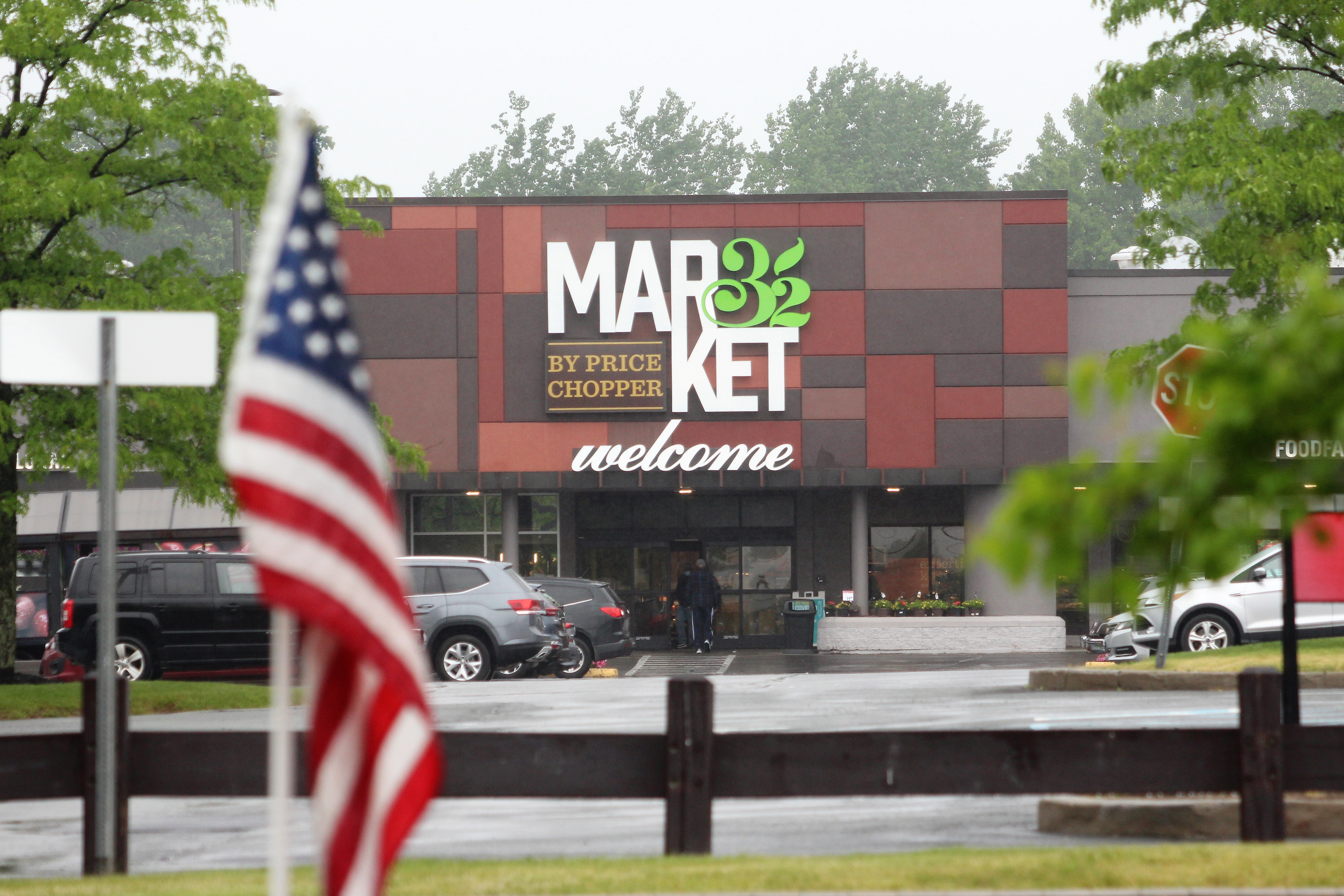
Market 32 store in East Greenbush, New York

With the opening of its newest store located in Colonie Plaza in Colonie, New York, on June 2, 2009, Price Chopper has made investments to incorporate various green and energy-saving initiatives throughout the store. Green features include a 400 kW United Technologies Corp. natural gas fuel cell which provides a significant amount of power (60% as quoted by Price Chopper) for the store. Abundant skylighting and an addressable lighting control system from Encelium Technologies allow the store to dim its lighting when enough daylight is present. Occupancy sensors cover nearly the entire layout of the store including all offices, backrooms and loading docks. It ensures that the lights are automatically switched-off or significantly dimmed when vacant for a certain period of time. Even aisle ways and other areas of the main sales floor are dimmed unless that aisle or section is occupied.

In March 2014, after over 15 months of renovations, Price Chopper completed its remodel of its 25-year-old Latham, New York store and rebranded the store as Market Bistro, including an expanded food court featuring hamburgers, a Ben & Bill's sandwich counter, stone-fired pizza, an ice cream shop, Chef's Grill, as well as an expanded 24-hour drive-through pharmacy, an on-site clinic, and a cooking school. It was later converted to Market 32 in June 2026.

On November 11, 2014, CEO Jerry Golub, along with Executive Chairman of the Board Neil Golub and the company's COO Scott Grimmett, announced that the chain would be changing its name to "Market 32" a nod to the year of the company's founding (1932) by brothers Ben and Bill Golub. Jerry Golub stated that the name change reflects Price Chopper's continuing advancements, and reflects that the company is now more of an upscale grocer and less of a discount retailer, as the name Price Chopper suggests. Changes to branding, product labels, loyalty cards, company uniforms, as well as store modernizations, are to be rolled-out over the coming years at a cost of more than $300 million. More than half of the company's 135 stores will be remodeled and rebranded. At least one-third of the $300 million is to be invested in stores in the New York Capital Region.

On June 17, 2015, Price Chopper announced that it would be phasing out the sale of tobacco products in all 135 of its Price Chopper and Market 32 stores, joining competitors Shoprite, Wegmans, and CVS/pharmacy.

=== 2020s ===
On February 8, 2021, Price Chopper Supermarkets/Market 32 and Tops Friendly Markets announced plans to merge. The new parent company will be headquartered in Schenectady, New York. The Price Chopper/Market 32 and Tops Markets businesses will retain main offices in Schenectady and Williamsville and will continue to be managed locally by their respective leaders. The merger was completed November 8, 2021 and the combined company is called Northeast Grocery. On November 28, 2023, it was revealed that Price Chopper had purchased all 5 of the former ShopRites in the Capital Region. The Niskayuna and North Greenbush locations will be converted to Market 32 while the Slingerlands location will be subleased. The Price Chopper locations at Westgate Plaza and Colonie Plaza will relocate to the former ShopRites in Albany and Colonie as Market 32s.

== Locations ==
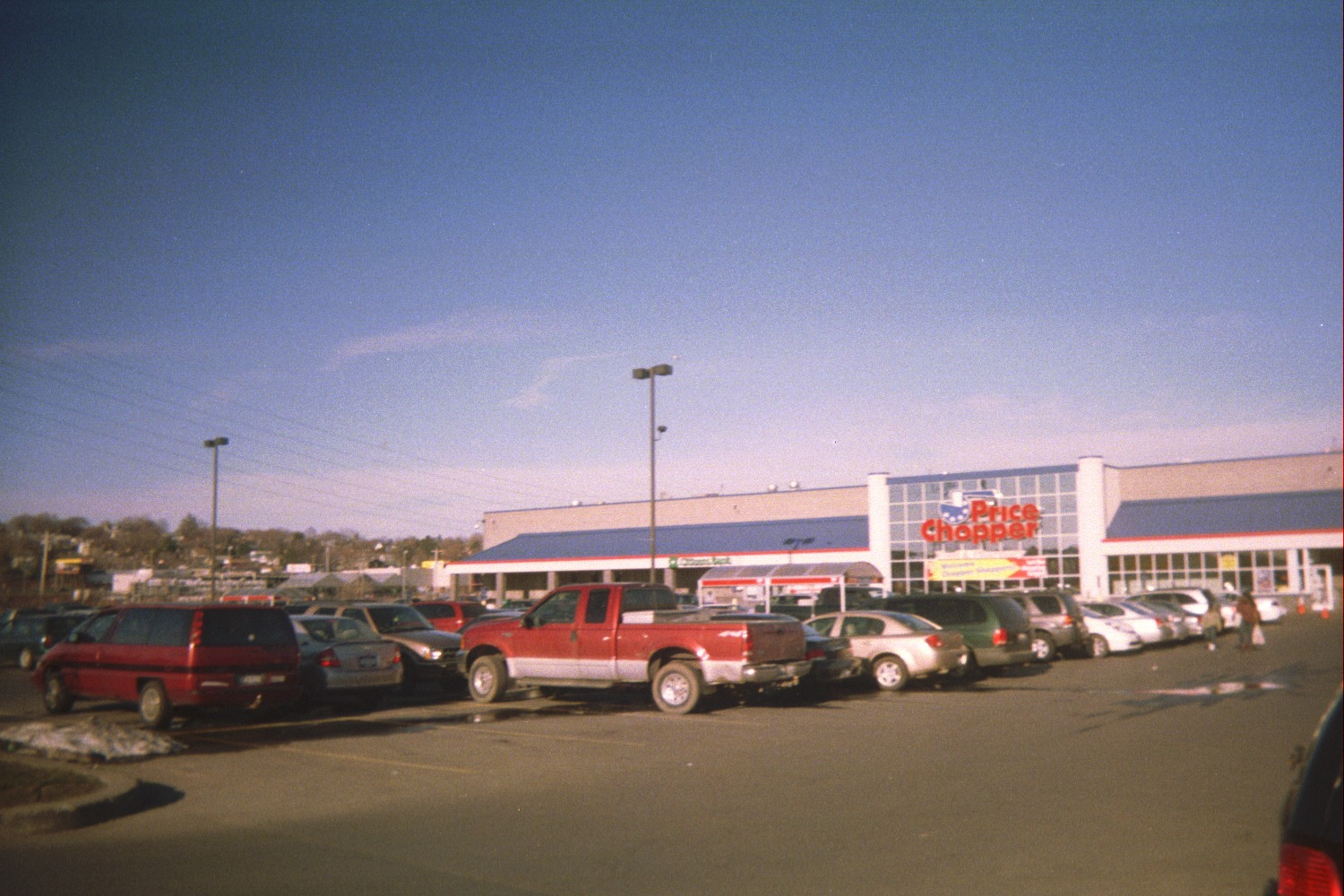
Price Chopper store in Syracuse, NY which has since been remodeled

Price Chopper operates 129 stores in Upstate New York, Connecticut, Pennsylvania, Vermont, Massachusetts and New Hampshire. Its locations are all serviced from the same warehouse in Rotterdam, New York. Price Chopper's primary market is still the Capital District of New York, where about one-third of its store base is located. Other major markets for Price Chopper include Utica, Syracuse, Binghamton, and the Mid-Hudson Valley in New York, as well as Scranton and Wilkes-Barre, Pennsylvania; Hartford, Connecticut; Worcester, Massachusetts and Burlington, Vermont. Price Chopper primarily competes with Hannaford, Shaw's, and Stop & Shop in the eastern portion of its trading area, while facing competition from Wegmans, and Tops Markets (formerly Penn Traffic storefronts) in the west, and ShopRite and Stop & Shop in the south.

The former Waterbury, Connecticut location closed in June 2008 and the location was purchased by ShopRite, which closed in November 2022, and became a Stop & Shop in January 2024. Other notable closures of market chains in the area include Shaw's of Waterbury, which closed in September 2007 as part of that chain's exit from the state. Price Chopper continues to operate in Connecticut with many stores.

== Slogans ==
- "You know you're doing better." (1980s)
- "We're not just in your neighborhood, we're your neighbor." (1985; 2010)
- "We Do More" (1980s; early 2000s)
- "Sharing more than a store." (1980s–1990s)
- "For people who love food." (1997–2000)
- "For people who love food... and savings!" (2000–2001)
- "We Know Meat!" (2000–present)
- "For people who love food... and low prices!" (2002)
- "Not cooking tonight... we're grilling tonight!" Summer House of BBQ campaign (2007–2015)
- "Best in Fresh and Low Prices" (2007–2015)
- "That's Price Chopper value."

== Brands and campaigns ==
Price Chopper has four private label brands: PICS by Price Chopper (main brand being phased in, replacing Price Chopper brand), Price Chopper (main brand used on most food products, being phased out with the transition to Market 32), Price Chopper Naturals (some organic products, being phased out), and Central Market Classics (upscale brand, used on higher-end foods and currently phased out). Other brands are sourced from Topco Associates, including TopCare (health and beauty products), Full Circle (natural and organic products), Valu Time (value-priced brand, often made using cheaper ingredients), and Simply Done (paper products, cleaning products, storage solutions, etc.)

From 2007 to 2015, the company had used a summer campaign to promote its fresh meats and produce, known simply as "Price Chopper House of BBQ." Accompanying this campaign, the company used the slogan "not cooking tonight... we’re grilling tonight" in jingles. The campaign mainly featured jazz musician Melvin Sparks until his death in 2011. For 2016, the House of BBQ was dropped from advertising in favor of a new campaign called "Summertime: Savor Every Moment."

== Ben and Bill's ==
In late 2005, renovations on the eight-year-old Slingerlands store (#159) began. Plans for the renovation included the opening of a New York-style sandwich shop named "Ben and Bill's" after the founders of the company. The Sandwich Shop sells a variety of pre-packaged products, such as typical New York City pastries, along with sandwiches and deli items. It stands next to the store's regular deli and is themed to look like a traditional New York City delicatessen. The sandwich shop was a success at the Slingerlands store and has since been rolled out to four other locations. The second Ben and Bill's opened in July 2008 in the Saratoga Springs (#158) store, a third location opened in September 2009 in Burlington, Vermont's (#165) store. In March 2014, a fourth location opened in Price Chopper's flagship store, the newly remodeled and rebranded Market Bistro (#138) store in Latham, New York. It was rebranded as Market 32 in 2026.
