= Joseph E. Grosberg =

American businessman (1883–1970)

- Born: December 27, 1883
- Died: July 25, 1970 (aged 86); Miami Beach, FL, United States
- Occupation: Businessman
- Spouse: Rachel (Kadisky) Greenberg Grosberg
- Children: Mildred Grosberg Bellin, Rosalind Cohen, Marian Champagne
- Relatives: Jacob Grosberg (father), Anna Lasky Grosberg (mother)

Joseph E. Grosberg (December 27, 1883 – July 25, 1970) was an American businessman in the supermarket and wholesale foods industries. He was a founder and the president of Central Markets, a chain of grocery stores in upstate New York that established some of the first supermarkets in the United States, and is now known as Price Chopper. He was also a noted philanthropist, especially known for his support of Jewish causes as well as charitable activities in Schenectady and the Capital District of New York.

== Biography ==
Joseph E. Grosberg (left) with business partner Sam Cramer standing on "Grosberg Grocery Co., Inc. Wholesale Grocers, Amsterdam, NY." delivery truck

=== Early life ===
Grosberg was born in 1883 in Russia. His father, Jacob Grosberg, immigrated to the United States through (Germany) to avoid being drafted into the Russian Army and in doing so, changed his surname from Gans to the more-German-sounding Grosberg. After Jacob established himself in the US, he sent a cabin class ticket for his wife (and presumably his oldest child, Joseph) to join him, but as was common those days when women traveled without a male accompanying them, Anna was put into the lower-class steerage section on the ship and her cabin class accommodations given to someone else. Jacob Grosberg later hired an attorney to write a letter to the shipping company complaining about the injustice, and the cost of his wife's passage was eventually reimbursed to him.

The oldest of eight children, Joseph sold newspapers on a street corner as a young boy to help support his family. Grosberg started in the grocery business in 1903 when he and his father, Jacob Grosberg, opened a retail grocery store, J. Grosberg & Son. A year later, the younger Grosberg entered the wholesale business, bringing wholesale groceries to the Schenectady, New York, area.

=== Central Markets ===
In 1930, Joseph Grosberg merged his wholesale business with that of Lewis Golub. In addition, he maintained the Grosberg Grocery Company of Amsterdam and headed Municipal Grocery Stores, Inc., a cooperative organization of independent grocers operating more than 400 stores throughout the New York state.

The Grosberg-Golub wholesale grocers opened their first supermarket in 1932 in Green Island, New York. It was one of the first self-service supermarkets in the country and its emphasis on low prices was very successful in the Depression-era economy. The following year Grosberg-Golub opened a second store: the first supermarket in Schenectady. With the opening of their third store, they changed the name to Central Market. Eventually the chain of Central Markets stores in New York included three large supermarkets in Schenectady, two in Troy, and one each in Glens Falls, Saratoga Springs, Albany, Mechanicville, Green Island, and Watervliet. In addition, the concern operated the DeForest Department Store in Cohoes, New York, and the Clark Department Store in Ballston Spa, New York. The policy of his supermarkets according to Grosberg was to provide food to the public at the lowest possible cost. This was accomplished through low overhead in the operation of the big supermarket and the company's tremendous buying power.

In addition to heading the Grosberg-Golub corporation, Grosberg was an officer in several national super market organizations including the New York Wholesale Grocers Association, president of the Seaboard Food Corporation, a national wholesale buying organization, and national secretary of the Super Market Institute.

Grosberg retired from the grocery business in 1943. Bernard and William Golub, the sons of his original partner Lewis Golub and partners in the Grosberg-Golub Corporation, bought Grosberg's share of the company and formed the Golub Corporation. In 1973, the Golubs changed the name of Central Markets to Price Chopper.

=== Philanthropy and civic activities ===
Grosberg was active in numerous civic affairs in the Schenectady area. He was one of the founders of Schenectady's first Zionist organization in 1903. He was a charter member and served as president of the Schenectady Kiwanis club. He was a 32nd degree Mason, a member of the Elks Club, and was involved in the Schenectady Community Chest, an organization first established in 1923 to coordinate the work and funding of charity and social-service organizations.

Grosberg was also active in Jewish affairs and an advocate for Israel. He was one of the founders of the Young Men's Hebrew Association (YMHA) in Schenectady in 1916, which went on to become the Schenectady Jewish Community Center (JCC). He devoted over 47 years of service to the YMHA and JCC, serving as president from 1916 to 1930 and also serving as chairman of the board of Trustees. He eventually donated the Joseph E. Grosberg Building to the Schenectady Jewish Community Center for their use. He was chairman of the United Jewish Appeal (a.k.a. Jewish National Appeal) which were held shortly before the outbreak of WWII in Europe to aid Jews who were being oppressed and driven from their homes by Hitler. He was the regional chairman of the United Synagogues of America, President of the United Hebrew Committee, and President of the Agudat Achim (then referred to as Nott Terrace) Synagogue in Schenectady. He also served as honorary vice president of the Troy Jewish Home for the Aged and for over 50 years installed officers of the local Jewish Social Service Organization. In 1943, Henry Montor, director of the United Palestine Appeal praised Grosberg's services in connection to raising funds for the rehabilitation of Palestine.

=== Death ===
Grosberg died on July 25, 1970, at Mount Sinai Hospital in Miami Beach, Florida; he was 86.

== Personal life ==
On October 21, 1906, Joseph married Rachael (Rae) Kadisky Greenberg. The couple was married for 64 years and had three daughters: Mildred Grosberg Bellin, a food writer best known for her influential works Modern Jewish Meals and The Jewish Cookbook; Rosalind Cohen; and Marian Champagne, an attorney and author.

== Timeline ==
1883 – Joseph E. Grosberg is born to Jacob (Gans) Grosberg and Anna Lasky in an area of Russia that later became part of Poland.

1903 – Grosberg opens a retail grocery store with his father Jacob Grosberg

1904 – Grosberg enters the wholesale grocery business

October 21, 1906 – Grosberg marries Rachael (Rae) Kadisky Greenberg in Troy, New York.

September 7, 1908 – Grosberg's first daughter Mildred is born.

October 24, 1912 – Grosberg's second daughter Rosalind (Rozzie) is born.

December 17, 1915 – Grosberg's third daughter Marian is born

November 1920 – Joseph Grosberg's wholesale company "Joseph E. Grosberg, Inc." is incorporated with Joseph and his wife, Rae Grosberg, as principle stockholders. Morris Greenblatt of Troy is also listed as a stockholder.

December 1920 – Grosberg incorporates his general grocery business, "Grosberg Grocery Company" with business associates George and Sam Cramer

February 1930 – The wholesale grocery houses of Joseph E. Grosberg, Inc and Lewis Golub merge. Officers of the newly merged wholesale company are Joseph Grosberg, president; William Golub (son of Lewis Golub), vice-president; Bernard Golub (son of Lewis Golub), treasurer; Nathan Levine, assistant treasurer; and Rae Grosberg (wife of Joseph Grosberg), secretary. Newspaper references of this merge list it under two different names. The February 12, 1930, issue of Schenectady Gazette lists the newly merged firm name as "Joseph E. Grosberg and Company, Inc." while the February 14, 1930, issue of Schenectady Gazette states that the Joseph E. Grosberg and Company, Inc. changed its corporate name to the "Double GG Grocery Company, Inc." Subsequent newspaper stories called the company either "Double GG Grocery Company" or "GG Grocery Company, Inc."

January 1931 – The Double GG Grocery Company, Inc. again changes its corporate name to the Grosberg-Golub Company, Inc.

1943 – Grosberg Retires and the Grosberg-Golub Corporation becomes the Golub Corporation.

July 27, 1970 – Joseph E. Grosberg passes away in Miami Beach, Florida

== See also ==
- List of grocers

== Newspaper Articles ==
- Schenectady Gazette, November 27, 1920 “Local Grocery Company”
- Schenectady Gazette, December 3, 1920 “Joseph E. Grosberg of Schenectady is the principal stockholder of the Grosberg Grocery Company of Amsterdam”
- Schenectady Gazette, February 12, 1930 “Wholesale Grocery Houses of Grosberg and Golub Combine”
- Amsterdam Evening Recorder, March 20, 1930 “Municipal Grocery Stores Is Organized In Amsterdam”
- Schenectady Gazette, February 14, 1930 “Golub Grosberg Firm to be known as G.G. Grocery Co.”
- Schenectady Gazette, January 7, 1931 “Grocery Chain Head Is Full Of Optimism”
- Schenectady Gazette, October 30, 1935 “J. E. Grosberg Head of 1936 Jewish Appeal”
- Schenectady Gazette, September 17, 1937 “Schenectady Homes of Central Market”
- The Knickerbocher News, Albany, NY, February 6, 1941 “Mayor Opens New Albany Market”
- Schenectady Gazette, Oct 23, 1943 “Grosberg, Executive of Grocery Firm Retires”
- Schenectady Gazette, November 29, 1943 “Grosberg Presented Plaque”
- Schenectady Gazette, November 6, 1950 “ Grosberg Long Active in UJA Aids Drive”
- Schenectady Gazette, November 5, 1957 “Joseph E. Grosberg Releases Deed to Jewish Community Center”
- Schenectady Gazette, June 11, 1958 “Joseph E. Grosberg To Be Feted June 30”
- The Leader-Herald, Gloversville – Johnstown, N. Y. Thursday, June 5, 1969 “Saga of Central Markets Is Told to Press”
- Schenectady Gazette, July 27, 1970 “J.E. Grosberg Dies; Supermarket Head”
- Sarasota Herald-Tribune, October 6, 1993 – Marian Champagne obituary
- Tulsa World February 20, 2008 – Mildred Grosberg Bellin Obituary
