= Tops Friendly Markets =

American supermarket chain

Tops Markets, LLC
- Trade name: Tops Friendly Markets
- Type: Private
- Industry: Retail grocery
- Founded: 1962 (64 years ago) Niagara Falls, New York
- Founders: Armand Castellani; Thomas Buscaglia
- Headquarters: Amherst, New York, U.S.
- Number of locations: 154 (149 supermarkets, 5 Tops Xpress stores)
- Areas served: Upstate New York, Vermont, and Northern Pennsylvania
- Key people: Ron Ferri (President)
- Products: Bakery, delicatessen, meat, frozen food, kosher foods, organic foods, pharmacy, produce, seafood, florist, carryout café
- Brands: Various
- Services: Supermarket; Drugstore; Gas Stations
- Revenue: ▲US$2.6 billion (2017)
- Owner: Morgan Stanley (2007–2013); Tops Management (2013–2021); Northeast Grocery (2021–present)
- Number of employees: 14,000
- Parent: Ahold (1991–2007)
- Divisions: Tops Xpress
- Website: topsmarkets.com

Tops Friendly Markets is an American supermarket chain based in Amherst, New York, that operates stores in upstate New York, Vermont, and Northern Pennsylvania. The chain operates full-scale supermarkets. Tops is a subsidiary of Northeast Grocery, which also owns the Price Chopper and Market 32 supermarkets based in Schenectady, New York. As of August 2025, the company operates 152 stores and 58 gas station/convenience stores. It formerly operated stores in Ohio and Massachusetts.

== History ==
=== Early years ===
Tops Friendly Markets was co-founded by Armand Castellani, who was born in 1917 in a village outside of Rome, Italy, and Thomas Buscaglia. Castellani's family came to the United States in 1920, and eventually settled in Niagara Falls, where his father, Ferrante, opened a small neighborhood grocery store.

Following his mother's death in 1933, Castellani left school to help manage the store. He continued to do so until joining the Army in 1941. He attained the rank of captain after five years' service.

After World War II, Castellani returned to the family business. In 1951, he set out on his own and opened the Great Bear Market in Niagara Falls. Shortly thereafter, he partnered with Buscaglia, owner of a grocery equipment firm, T.A. Buscaglia Equipment Co. Throughout the 1950s, Buscaglia, as CEO, and Castellani worked together, entering into a cooperative agreement with other small stores to build the foundation of what was to become the Tops Friendly Markets chain.

As the local economy boomed in the mid-to-late 1950s, the company's operations expanded to include building construction principally devoted to supermarkets. During this time, Savino Nanula, a meat department manager, became an integral part of the company's management team.

By 1958, they had set up headquarters in Buffalo, and in 1962 opened their first modern supermarket: a 25,000 sq ft (2,300 m^{2}) store on Portage Road in Niagara Falls. Alfonse DiMino, a Bells franchisee, suggested the name "Tops" and the team chose that name because they were determined to give customers the best shopping experience. The company then changed its name to Niagara Frontier Services (NFS).

=== 1960s ===
In 1962, franchise systems were established for supermarkets, under the Tops Friendly Markets name, and for smaller stores as B-Kwik. In February of that year, Tops signs went up on seven stores, and the chain was born. By the end of the year, NFS was composed of 15 franchised stores throughout Western New York, employing a total of 300 associates. Throughout the 1960s, NFS implemented warehousing and centralized purchasing to allow the company to grow efficiently.

In 1967, Buscaglia died and Armand Castellani took over as chief executive officer.

The next year, NFS went public, trading on the American Stock Exchange. Subsequently, the company began construction on a perishable warehouse and acquired general merchandise distributor G&G Sales and Service.

The following year, 1969, NFS entered the convenience store market by opening the first Wilson Farms Neighborhood Food store in Tonawanda, New York. The same year, Tops Friendly Markets was named Retailer of the Year by the Brand Names Foundation, an honor it would again earn in 1974.

=== 1970s–80s ===
The 1970s saw Tops Friendly Markets, under the leadership of Castellani and Nanula, continue to grow in Western New York, and thrive where competitors struggled. Early in the decade, Tops began to build more company-owned stores. By the mid-70s, the company had expanded into the Rochester area, and over time, it became the only real competitor to Wegmans in the region. Also during this time, Tops Friendly Markets opened its first Pennsylvania store in Bradford.

In 1983, SB Investors, a private, New York-based investment group, purchased NFS. By this time, operations had grown to include 65 Tops stores, 50 Wilson Farms stores and 15 B-Kwik Food Stores, employing 7,000 associates.

The next year, Tops Friendly Markets introduced Western New York shoppers to direct debit service, Instabank ATMs and the first CarryOut Café. It was also the year that Tops won the first of eight Golden Penguin Award from the National Frozen Food Association.

In 1985, Castellani was named chairman of the board and Nanula succeeded him as CEO. The following spring, SB Investors became known as Tops Friendly Markets, Inc., as the company went public for the second time, this time on NASDAQ. The following year, as Tops Friendly Markets celebrated its 25th anniversary, a $196 million leveraged buyout of the company was engineered between a group of Tops Friendly Markets executives and private equity firm Riordan, Freeman & Spogli. In 1987, Tops installed electronic scanners, one of the last supermarkets to do so.

=== 1990s ===
A new era began March 27, 1991 as Tops Friendly Markets, which had grown to 145 total stores and 11,000 associates, was acquired by Ahold, a major international food retailer based in the Netherlands. The same year, the first Tops Friendly Markets International Super Center opened in Amherst. At that time, the 112,000 sq ft (10,400 m^{2}) store was the largest in Western New York, and boasted the biggest in-store bakery in the entire U.S.

In the next few years additional Tops Friendly Markets International stores opened in Niagara Falls, West Seneca, Greece, and Perinton, New York. Also, a franchised International-style store, which operates as a Tops Friendly Market, was opened in Lockport. The International stores feature additional floor space and a product mix of many foods from different world cultures which up until then had not been widely available in the Buffalo area. With many Canadians at the time regularly crossing the border due to relaxed duties after the recently concluded Canada-United States Free Trade Agreement and the Canadian dollar at 90% of the value to its American counterpart, the new stores were in the right place at the right time and did even better business than expected.

The 1990s were marked by a new growth in operations, including the 1996 merger with Finast in Northeast Ohio, expansion across New York, the construction of a new headquarters in Amherst, New York, and the opening of an 848,000 sq ft (78,800 m^{2}) distribution center in Lancaster. By 1998, Tops Friendly Markets' market area stretched from Sandusky, Ohio, to Utica. In January 1999, the BonusCard, its customer loyalty program, debuted. In May 1999, all 45 Northeast Ohio Finast stores adopted the Tops Friendly Markets banner.

=== 2000s ===
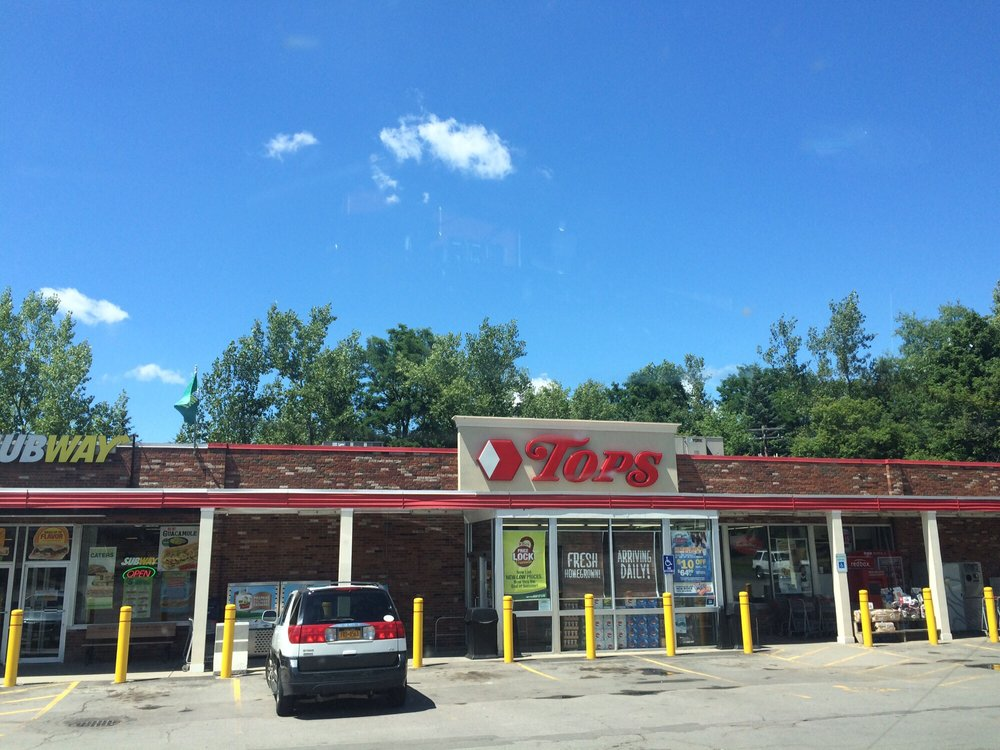
A Tops Friendly Markets store in Boston, New York in 2015, formerly a B-Kwik.

Tops Friendly Markets entered into the new millennium by acquiring the Sugarcreek Stores chain, adding 87 stores to its Wilson Farms division. That summer, Tops installed self-scanning checkouts at 11 stores in Ohio and in late August, the first Tops fueling station premiered in Akron.

In 2001, Tops acquired 22 former Grand Union stores in the Adirondacks region and in Central New York, further east than its market had traditionally been. They also introduced the Tops Xpress convenience store format. By the end of the year, the company celebrated another landmark with the opening of its 150th Tops store, located in Madison, Ohio.

This aggressive growth was fueled in part by deliberate understatements of Ahold's debt to the financial markets. When this came to light in 2003, Tops was forced to backtrack. By 2005 the convenience stores had been sold to WFI Acquisition Inc., which later sold the stores to convenience store operator powerhouse 7-Eleven, and Tops Friendly Markets was also looking to sell the 31 stores it had established in the Adirondack region. P&C Foods acquired 2, Price Chopper acquired six, Hannaford acquired three, and twelve returned to the Grand Union division of C&S Wholesale Grocers.

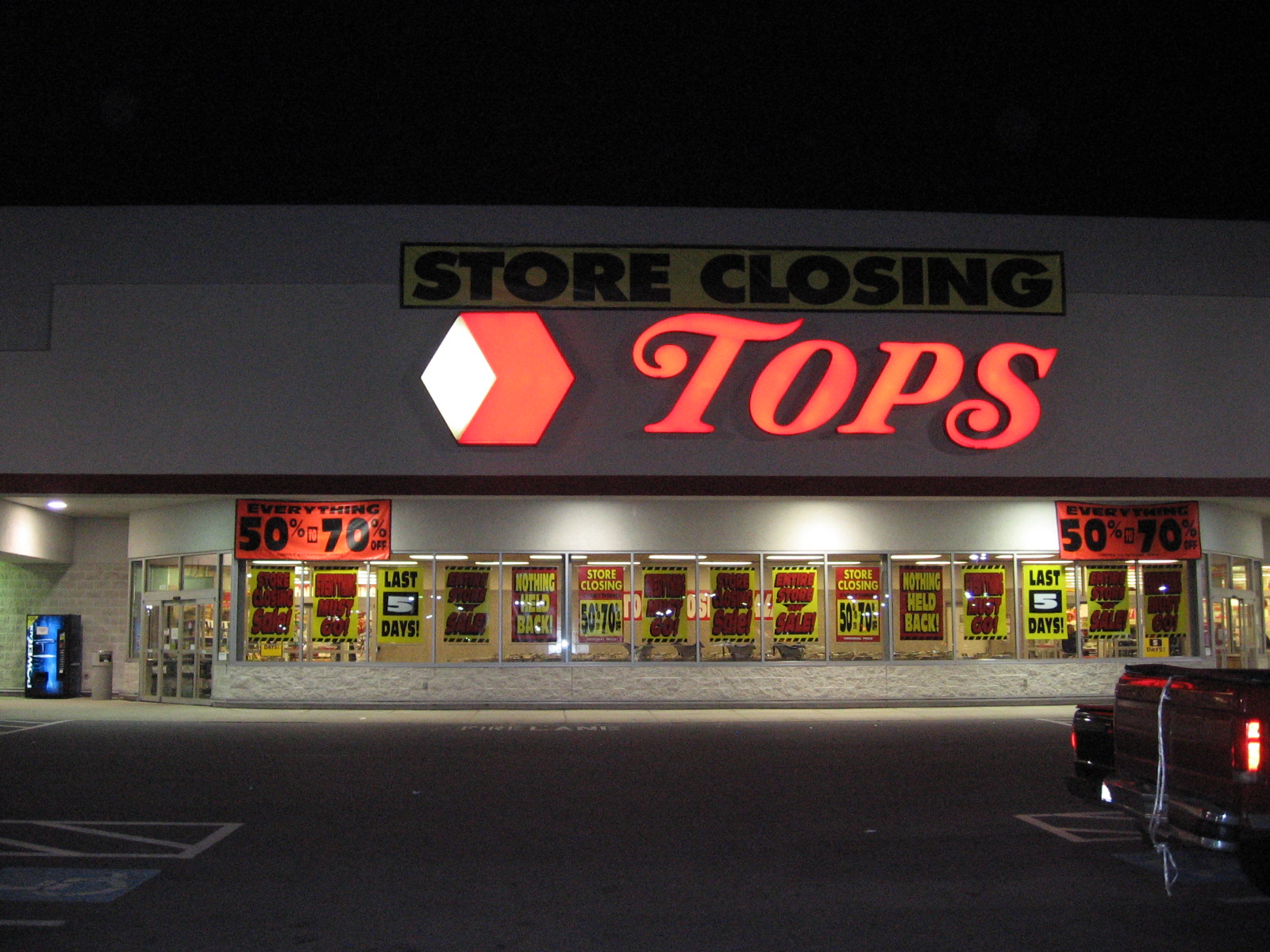
Store closing in Tallmadge, Ohio in 2006, which later became an Acme Fresh Market store

On July 6, 2006, Ahold announced its decision to exit the Northeast Ohio market, which consisted of 46 locations. The 46 stores were located in Greater Cleveland, Akron and Norwalk and at the time employed approximately 3,800 full and part-time employees. Tops announced on October 10, 2006 that 18 of its Ohio stores were sold to rival Giant Eagle. The store in Youngstown which closed prior to 2006, was sold, expanded, and converted to Target. An additional store in Sheffield, Ohio, was sold on November 29, 2006. The store in Tallmadge, Ohio, was sold to local competitor Acme Fresh Market. On November 9 in a company press release, it was stated that all Tops stores in Northeast Ohio would close whether they have been sold or not. A store in Cleveland's Lee-Harvard Neighborhood and a store in Garfield Heights were converted to Dave's Markets, a small independently owned chain of grocery stores in Cleveland. In June, the Tops store in Cleveland Heights became a Dave's. All Northeast Ohio stores closed by 3 pm on December 8, 2006 and some remain unoccupied.

=== 2010s ===
In October and November 2012, Tops closed one store and downsized a second store. The first was the Elmridge Center store in Greece, New York which closed in October 2012. Employees and customers were absorbed into other nearby locations. The Geneva, New York, store downsized and moved into the Geneva Town Centre in November 2012. This new store is a 51,364 sq ft (4,771.9 m^{2}) location and has upgraded departments, along with a gas station, that were not in the formerly larger location. Both of these stores had been 84,000 sq ft (7,800 m^{2}) superstores that Tops built in the early 1990s.

In 2013, Tops downsized another store in the Rochester suburbs. The Jefferson Rd location in Henrietta, New York, relocated to the Frontier Commons Plaza. As a result, the store is now 55,000 square feet instead of the previous 76,000 square feet it formerly occupied. The new location also contains departments and a gas station which were not found in the former location.

In 2014, Tops downsized a store in Perinton and an Irondequoit, New York store on East Ridge Road. The Irondequoit store was relocated to the Depot Plaza, which used to be anchored by Kmart.

==== Chapter 11 bankruptcy ====
On February 21, 2018, Tops filed for Chapter 11 Bankruptcy. None of the stores' day-to-day operations were to be affected. According to the Securities and Exchange Commission, the reason for filing was due to Tops' $720 million debt. This opportunity was being used to restructure financially so it could grow and be more competitive.

On August 30, 2018, Tops announced they would be closing ten underperforming locations by November, including two in Syracuse, one on West Genesee Street (NY 5) at Westvale Plaza, and another on South Salina Street (US 11) at Valley Plaza, two in Rochester, one on Lake Avenue and another on North Winton Road, and one each in Perinton, Lyons, Geneva, Fulton, Elmira (the South Main Street location) and Saranac Lake (at the Lake Flower Plaza).

Tops Markets announced they emerged from bankruptcy on November 19, 2018.

=== 2020s ===
On February 8, 2021, Price Chopper Supermarkets/Market 32 and Tops Market announced plans to merge. The new parent company will be headquartered in Schenectady, New York. The Price Chopper/Market 32 and Tops Markets businesses will retain main offices in Schenectady and Williamsville and will continue to be managed locally by their respective leaders.

Nine months later, the merger was completed. The stores will now be owned and overseen by Northeast Grocery, with current President and CEO of Price Chopper/Market 32 managing the merger & Tops Friendly Markets CEO Frank Curci taking over in February 2022. The FTC required the combined company to divest from 12 of the combined companies’ stores.

On April 29, 2024, Tops Markets announced the acquisition of five locations that were operated by Supermarket Management, Inc. The franchise partner had operated Tops locations for more than 60 years. As a result of the acquisition, all 585 employees were retained, and renovations totalling more than $8 million were announced for the Lockport, Depew, and Buffalo stores.

After the acquisition of these stores, only one franchise location remains, in Lewiston.

== Martin's Super Food Stores ==
In 2004, Tops Friendly Markets fully remodeled a store in Perinton, and rebranded it Martin's Super Food Store in an effort to revitalize the marketplace. Martin's Food Markets is a brand owned by Tops Friendly Markets' then-parent company, Ahold, via their subsidiary Giant-Carlisle. The stores were designed in a colorful manner in order to attract both new and old customers. The format worked well for the company, which prompted them to remodel another location in the Buffalo suburb of Amherst into the Martin's Super Food Store format, and then later three other stores in Dunkirk-Fredonia, Derby, and Batavia. As of April 16, 2006, the Martin's Super Food Store in Amherst reverted to a Tops Market due to customer feedback, and the company announced it would no longer pursue the Martin's brand in New York.

As of February 28, 2008, the remaining Martin's locations were all returned to the Tops Friendly Markets brand as part of the sale to Morgan Stanley Private Equity. The decision was made to operate the company under one banner going forward.

== Transition from Ahold to Morgan Stanley ==
Ahold announced on November 6, 2006 that the remaining 72 stores in the Tops chain, in New York and Pennsylvania, would be sold. Although they have been profitable, it is a strategic decision for Ahold to focus on other chains such as Giant and Stop & Shop.

On November 7, 2006, it was reported that Price Chopper might buy the chain. It had previously bought six former locations.

On May 25, 2007, well-known grocery industry consultant Burt P. Flickinger III announced that he is part of a group of investors interested in purchasing the Tops Markets chain. Flickinger's family co-financed the first 60 Tops Friendly Markets stores that opened, and stated that he hopes to restore the local focus that Tops was originally known for.

On June 1, 2007, it was reported that Tops Friendly Markets agreed to repurchase its Lancaster warehouse from C&S Wholesale Grocers, while C&S will continue to operate and manage the warehouse. Max Henderson, Executive Vice President and General Manager of Tops Markets, stated that he hoped repurchasing the warehouse would make Tops more attractive to a potential buyer.

On October 11, 2007, Ahold announced the sale of Tops Friendly Markets, LLC to Morgan Stanley Private Equity in a transaction valued at $310 million. Morgan Stanley agreed to purchase 71 of the 72 stores in the chain. The Baytowne Plaza store in Penfield, New York, known to Tops associates as the "Webster store", was not part of the transaction. The owners of the Baytowne Plaza notified all of their tenants that they would not be allowed to renew their lease upon expiration, and Tops Markets closed the doors of their store to the public on October 27, 2007.

== Morgan Stanley ==
At 12:01 am on December 2, 2007, Morgan Stanley Private Equity became the new owner of Tops Markets. Ahold's subsidiary Giant Food of Carlisle provided operational and support services for up to one year after the sale. Max Henderson, Executive Vice President of Tops, resigned his position from the company, and Frank Curci, a former Tops Friendly Markets CEO, returned as CEO of the company.

Tops Friendly Markets brought back approximately 100 corporate positions in marketing, merchandising and finance to Buffalo, New York. Recently, those positions had been based in Carlisle, Pennsylvania by Giant Food. Existing stores resumed upgrades and remodeling, and plans for new stores continue. Tim Hortons full-service restaurants or self-serve kiosks as well as Anchor Bar wings were added to all stores. A growth rate of more than 10% is expected over the next four to five years.

== New stores, acquisitions, and merger ==
On November 18, 2009, it was announced that the chain would open a new store in Spencerport, New York. This was the first time since the Morgan Stanley acquisition that the chain had opened a new store. It opened on August 18, 2010. The 38,000 sq ft (3,500 m^{2}) location took over space that had previously been occupied by an IGA.

Tops was confirmed as the high bidder of Penn Traffic and on January 25, 2010 a federal judge signed off on an agreement in US Bankruptcy Court for the sale of same. The purchase stretched the company's footprint from Pennsylvania to New Hampshire. The Penn Traffic deal was for 79 stores, but Tops closed four stores within two months, in addition to one in Ogdensburg, New York. In March 2010, it was announced that an additional five stores, including one in Ithaca, New York, would close. In April, Giant Eagle agreed to purchase five former Penn Traffic stores in Pennsylvania from Tops. The Tops name was placed on remaining stores within the next year. In August 2010, Tops was ordered by the Federal Trade Commission to sell seven stores it had acquired from Penn Traffic due to anticompetitive concerns. However, Tops was able to retain some of these locations. The former P&C location in Sayre, Pennsylvania, closed in October 2017, while another former P&C location in Westvale, Syracuse closed in November 2018.

On February 28, 2011 Tops opened a new store on Harlem Road (NY 240) in Cheektowaga, New York, in a former Jubilee Foods store.

On September 1, 2011, Tops acquired Furnal's Fresh Market in Hilton, New York. It reopened as a Tops on September 29, 2011

On July 19, 2012 it was announced that Tops Friendly Markets will acquire 21 Grand Union stores in October 2012. On May 28, 2013 nine Grand Union stores held grand reopening ceremonies under the Tops banner. The remaining 12 locations were rebannered and held grand reopening ceremonies on July 2, 2013. Note that a large number of these were in the Adirondacks, and were in fact the same stores that had operated as Tops for a few years back in the early 2000s after Grand Union's bankruptcy, as noted above. The Saranac Lake location at Lake Flower Plaza closed in November 2018.

On June 27, 2012 Tops Markets announced the acquisition of the North Boston Market Place in Boston, New York (originally a B-Kwik). On July 11, 2012 Tops Markets announced plans to open its first new store in the City of Syracuse since acquiring the Penn Traffic chain. The store opened in Valley Plaza on the cities south side on October 30, 2012 in a former P&C location although the new Tops was considerably smaller. This location closed in November 2018. In October 2012, Tops Markets began renovations at a former Wegmans location, named by Wegmans as the Pond Street store (which closed in June 2012) on the north side of Syracuse. The store opened on January 15, 2013.

On December 6, 2012 Tops Markets announced the acquisition of three Big M supermarkets in Jordan, New York, Elbridge, New York, and Mexico, New York, from the Farrugia family. The Jordan and Elbridge locations held grand reopening ceremonies on April 24, 2013 after renovations and rebannering. The Jordan location closed in October, 2017.

In March 2013, Tops Markets announced plans to open a new 36,000 sq ft store in Corning, New York. The store opened June 24, 2014 in the former P&C Foods location which closed down and relocated in 2002.

On May 23, 2013 Tops Markets announced the acquisition of four Big M supermarkets in Boonville, New York, Adams, New York, Sandy Creek, New York, and Watertown, New York from the Bonisteel family.

In November 2013, Tops Markets announced a management buyout. The buyout, which was expected to be completed by the end of 2013, involved Morgan Stanley Private Equity selling all remaining shares to Tops management, including CEO Frank Curci. As a result, all decisions returned to being locally made. In addition, it made Tops Markets one of the largest privately owned companies in the Buffalo area.

In December, 2013 Tops Markets announced that it would be taking back operations of its Lancaster distribution facility from C&S Wholesale Grocers. The company plans to renovate the facility to make it possible for Tops to carry more natural, specialty and organic items.

In May 2014 Tops announced the acquisition of another Big M supermarket in Clifton Springs, New York.

Also in May 2014 Tops officials held a ground breaking ceremony for a brand new store slated to open in Walworth, New York early in 2015.

In July 2014, Tops acquired a Budwey's supermarket in Newfane, New York. It became a Tops in August 2014.

In the Spring of 2015, Tops announced agreements to purchase two additional stores. One in Lyons, New York which had previously operated as Loson's Big M, which closed in 2013 (the Loson family also owned the aforementioned Clifton Springs Big M), and a Thorne's Bilo in Warren, Pennsylvania, which was the first acquisition of a store in Pennsylvania since the Penn Traffic acquisition. It reopened as a Tops in December 2015. The Lyons location closed in November 2018.

In July 2015 Struppler Shurfine in Fulton, New York announced that it had been purchased by Tops Markets. The store reopened as a Tops on Saturday August 22, 2015. This location closed in November 2018.

On August 4, 2015 Tops Markets announced that it would be replacing Wade's supermarket in Farmington, New York. The store reopened as a Tops Market on Saturday November 7, 2015.

On December 9, 2015 it was announced that Tops Friendly Markets would open at the former Sanborn Market Place in Sanborn, New York. The store would be expanded from 6,000 to 12,000 square ft and is scheduled to open on April 1, 2016.

Tops Friendly Markets' first announced acquisition of 2016 continued its focus on Pennsylvania with the purchase of the Westfield Big M from owner Bion Warren. This acquisition was announced on February 17, 2016 with a transition date of April 4, 2016.

In July 2016, it was announced that Tops had entered into a purchase agreement with Ahold and Delhaize Group for 4 Stop & Shop locations in Rhinebeck, New Paltz and Wappingers Falls, New York and Gardner, Massachusetts and 2 Hannaford Brothers locations in LaGrangeville and Carmel, New York, as part of the divestiture of stores to gain clearance from the Federal Trade Commission for the impending Ahold/Delhaize merger. This acquisition will mark the entry of Tops Markets into Massachusetts and increase the number of states where its stores are located to four.

These stores reopened after an approximately 36 hour closure at each (for changes needed in systems) during the last full week of August 2016. The Gardner, Massachusetts location closed in December 2017, ending the chain's brief presence in that state, while the Wappinger location closed in February 2018.

Also in July 2016, Tops announced its agreement to purchase, and reopen as a Tops in August 2016, the IGA Village Market in Hannibal, New York, from the Mirabito family, adding another store to its network in Oswego County.

In June 2017, Tops acquired the Angola Shurfine (originally Jubilee then Shop 'n Save).

In February 2021, Tops announced that they had entered into a definitive merger agreement with Price Chopper Supermarkets. The new parent company will be headquartered in Schenectady, New York. The Price Chopper/Market 32 and Tops Markets businesses will retain main offices in Schenectady and Williamsville and will continue to be managed locally by their respective leaders. The transaction is expected to close in the coming months, subject to regulatory approval and customary closing conditions.

== Orchard Fresh ==
In November 2012, Tops Markets announced the creation of a second grocery store, Orchard Fresh, specializing in upscale, natural, and organic foods with an emphasis on health and wellness. It debuted at the Orchard Park Plaza in Orchard Park, New York in April 2013. The new Orchard Fresh store was 18,000 sq ft (1,700 m^{2}) in size, a smaller footprint than most of the traditional Tops stores. It closed in April 2020, never having expanded. Company officials said the concept had served as a testing ground for natural, organic and gourmet products, many of which were subsequently incorporated into Tops' traditional supermarket format.
