= Penn Traffic =

Defunct retail chain

The Penn Traffic Company
- Company type: Public
- Industry: Retail
- Founded: 1854
- Defunct: 2010
- Fate: Assets sold to Tops Markets
- Headquarters: Syracuse, New York, U.S.
- Products: Bakery, dairy, deli, frozen foods, meat, pharmacy, produce, seafood, snacks

The Penn Traffic Company was a food service company founded in 1854 in Johnstown, Pennsylvania.

The company eventually evolved into a general merchandise department store. By the early 1960s, it also returned to the food business through the acquisition of Super Value Corporation, which operated the 10-store Riverside supermarket chain.

In 1982, the company sold its department stores and concentrated solely on the food and supermarket business. A series of financial troubles led to Penn Traffic's Chapter 11 bankruptcy filing in November 2009, and sale of assets to Tops Markets in early 2010.

At the time of sale, Penn Traffic was the parent company for 79 retail supermarkets in the Northeastern United States, concentrating mostly in Central New York. Its headquarters were in Syracuse, New York. Penn Traffic formerly had operated supermarkets in Pennsylvania, Vermont, and New Hampshire under the Insalaco's, Bi-Lo/Riverside/U-Save, P&C and Quality trade names. The company also operated a wholesale food distribution business, purchased in 2008 by C&S Wholesale Grocers, which served approximately 121 independent operators.

== History ==
=== 19th century ===
Penn Traffic traces its origins back to the 1850s, when it was a trading post in Johnstown, Pennsylvania. Over the years, Penn Traffic evolved first into a general-merchandise department store and later a large retail and wholesale supermarket company.

=== 20th century ===
In 1922, it established Johnstown's first radio station, WTAC, which was licensed until early 1926. Riverside, founded in Brookville, Pennsylvania, in 1928, became part of the Penn Traffic family in 1962, and began developing the Bi-Lo format in the 1980s, unrelated to the chain in the Mid-Atlantic. Penn Traffic operated 43 supermarkets under the Bi-Lo trade name across Pennsylvania, and also distributed food to 51 franchised and independent supermarkets from its DuBois, Pennsylvania, distribution facility. Quality Markets, founded in Jamestown, New York, in 1913, joined the Penn Traffic family in 1979. Penn Traffic operated a total of 34 supermarkets under the Quality trade name in southwestern New York and northwestern Pennsylvania.

Penn Traffic's flagship department store in Johnstown, challenged by economic decline, permanently closed after the 1977 flood. The company sold its six department stores and two women's specialty-store leases to Crown American Corporation, owner of the Hess's department store chain, in 1982 in order to concentrate on the supermarket business.

Miller, Tabak, Hirsch & Company, a New York City-based investment group, began its takeover bid for Penn Traffic in 1986. Early takeover attempts were resisted by management but by 1987, Penn Traffic agreed to an offer by an affiliate of the investment firm and the company was briefly taken private for $131 million (~$309 million in 2024).

In 1988, under then-chairman Gary Hirsch, Penn Traffic began an acquisition program. Hirsch first took Penn Traffic public, raising $25 million, and then added Syracuse-based P&C Food Markets for $219 million.

In 1989, Penn Traffic acquired Ohio chain Big Bear Stores for $341 million (~$749 million in 2024).

==== P&C Foods ====
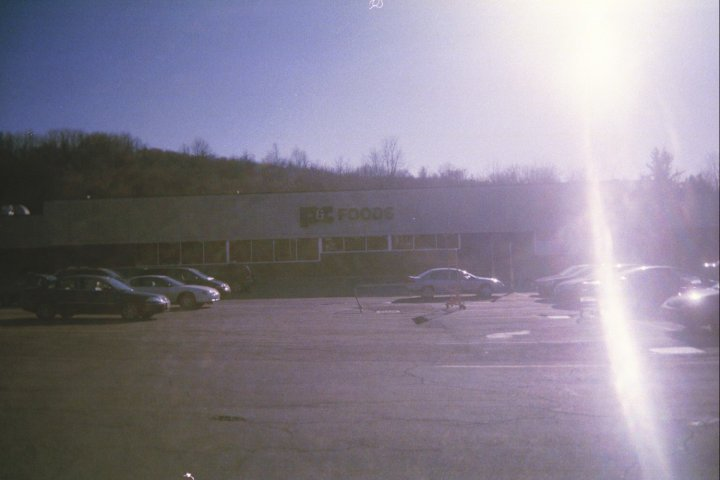
P&C Foods in Syracuse, New York. Previously Peters and later Tops.

P&C Foods began in 1944 as the Producers and Consumers food cooperative in Ithaca, New York, as a way for farmers in upstate New York to get their products to market efficiently. Until 2010, Penn Traffic operated 70 P&C supermarkets serving the Syracuse metropolitan area and other communities in upstate New York, Vermont, New Hampshire, and Pennsylvania. P&C was also a major wholesaler in upstate New York; from its Syracuse warehouse, the company served 99 independent supermarkets in central New York, the majority of which still operate under the Big M franchise trade name.

In 1997, a new ballpark for the Syracuse SkyChiefs opened as P&C Stadium. Penn Traffic owned the naming rights for nine baseball seasons.

The last P&C Foods branded grocery store closed on January 21, 2012, in Bath, New York, when the building was sold to Moran Foods, owner of Save-A-Lot, by order of the FTC. The P&C name survives today in Cortland and Ithaca under new owners.

==== Big Bear ====
When the first Big Bear store opened in 1933, it marked the beginning of self-service supermarket operations in the Midwest. Big Bear was the first supermarket in the country to use cashier-operated motorized conveyor belts and the first to use an IBM mainframe computer. In the 1980s, its Big Bear Plus stores combined a supermarket with a general merchandise store. Penn Traffic operated 70 Big Bear and Big Bear Plus stores in Ohio and West Virginia until early 2004. As a result of Penn Traffic's 2003 bankruptcy filing, these stores were either closed or sold to other companies, such as grocery retailer Giant Eagle, while other properties were left vacant and still remain vacant. The Columbus, Ohio warehouses operated by Big Bear were also left vacant and subsequently torn down for redevelopment.

In the early and middle 1990s, Penn Traffic continued to grow as it acquired and built other supermarkets in and near its primary markets. During this time, Penn Traffic entered the Buffalo, New York and Erie, Pennsylvania markets with the Quality trade name and made substantial investments to enhance its store base and distribution network, while maintaining steady growth in cash flow and profitability.

In 1997, Hirsch hired Phil Hawkins, who was credited with saving the Vons supermarket chain in California. Hawkins cut costs and fired 325 employees, including all five division heads, some with 20 years or more with Penn Traffic. As CEO, Hawkins replaced USDA Choice meat in its butcher shops with a cheaper grade meat. In an effort to reposition its stores as value-focused, Hawkins slashed expenses by using generic grocery bags, postponing store maintenance, and reducing benefits to employees. In the Columbus market, prices did not uniformly drop and competitors, including Kroger and Meijer regularly beat Big Bear in third party cost comparisons.

Meanwhile, better capitalized competitors, including Wegmans and Kroger, cut into market share. Same store sales fell 8.2% in fiscal 1998, while operating income declined another 6%, to $165 million ($295 million in 2024). In Columbus, where Kroger and Big Bear had once been neck and neck, Big Bear's market share dropped to 20% from 25%, while Kroger's rose to 54% from 44% in 1998, according to a survey by The Columbus Dispatch. Hawkins resigned before the first bankruptcy filing, March 1, 1999.

In the late 1990s, Penn Traffic experienced a significant reduction in its profitability because of several merchandising and operational changes that had a negative impact on its business. By late 1998, the company realized that while it had strong consumer franchises, it was working under an untenable debt burden. To address this challenge, in early 1999 Penn Traffic negotiated an agreement with bondholders to restructure more than $1.1 billion in bond debt.

In 1998, Penn Traffic sold its dairy operations, Sani-Dairy in Johnstown, Pennsylvania, to Dean Foods. The dairy provided fluid milk, sour cream, ice cream, novelties, and cottage cheese to Penn Traffic stores and to private label customers.

Penn Traffic completed its financial restructuring in June 1999 with more than 75% of its debt retired.

In 2003, the company filed for bankruptcy again, this time resulting in the loss of Big Bear, one of their largest grocery chains. Fischer resigned one month into the second Chapter 11 filing, and was replaced by Steven G. Panagos, a corporate turnaround specialist. Panagos sold the Big Bear division, shuttered unprofitable stores, cut overhead and gave the underfunded pension plan back to the PBGC. Following the Chapter 11 filing, Robert Chapman was named the new CEO of Penn Traffic. Penn Traffic was named to the S&P 500 in March 2003 only to have a scandal later that year negatively effect all of Fischer diligence.

In 2007, two former Penn Traffic executives were indicted on fraud charges.

In early 2008, Penn Traffic closed its private bakery, Penny Curtiss, citing the loss of the local Aldi stores contract in August 2007 as the primary reason for the bakery's closing. The company said the bakery was contributing less than 4% of Penn Traffic's total annual revenue.

In December 2008, Penn Traffic entered into a definitive agreement to sell its wholesale business segment to C&S Wholesale Grocers Inc.

On November 18, 2009, Penn Traffic filed for Chapter 11 bankruptcy protection following second-quarter 2009 losses of $7 million, the highest loss ever for the company, missed loan payments, and slower shipments from suppliers. The company initially intended to sell all of its assets by the end of 2009 and close on the deal or deals by the early January 2010.

As of January 9, 2010, Penn Traffic was entertaining three separate bids: $54 million from Price Chopper for 22 P&C Foods stores, a private bid of $36.5 million from a team of professional liquidators for all of P&C's assets and $85 million from Tops Markets for all of Penn Traffic's stores.

== Sale to Tops Markets ==
On January 25, 2010, Tops Markets' bid was signed off by a federal judge in U.S. Bankruptcy Court and was awarded the sale of all 79 Penn Traffic stores. Closing occurred on Jan 29, 2010. The amount of the sale would be slightly more than the previously agreed upon price of $85 million cash and assumption of approximately $70 million of Penn Traffic's debt.

The BiLo and Riverside names survive in Pennsylvania, though three former locations have since converted to Tops. The P&C name (P&C Fresh) was later relaunched by three ex-PT executives in Cortland, New York, Ithaca, New York, and Sayre, Pennsylvania; the Sayre, Pennsylvania store has since sold to Tops.

== See also ==
- Tops Markets
- Kroger
- Giant Eagle
- Meijer
- Save-A-Lot
- Aldi
