= Grand Union (supermarket) =

United States supermarket chain

Grand Union Family Markets
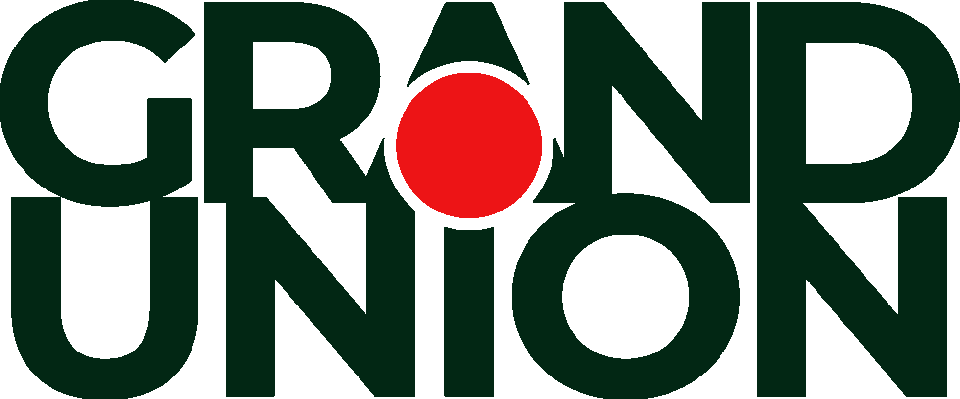

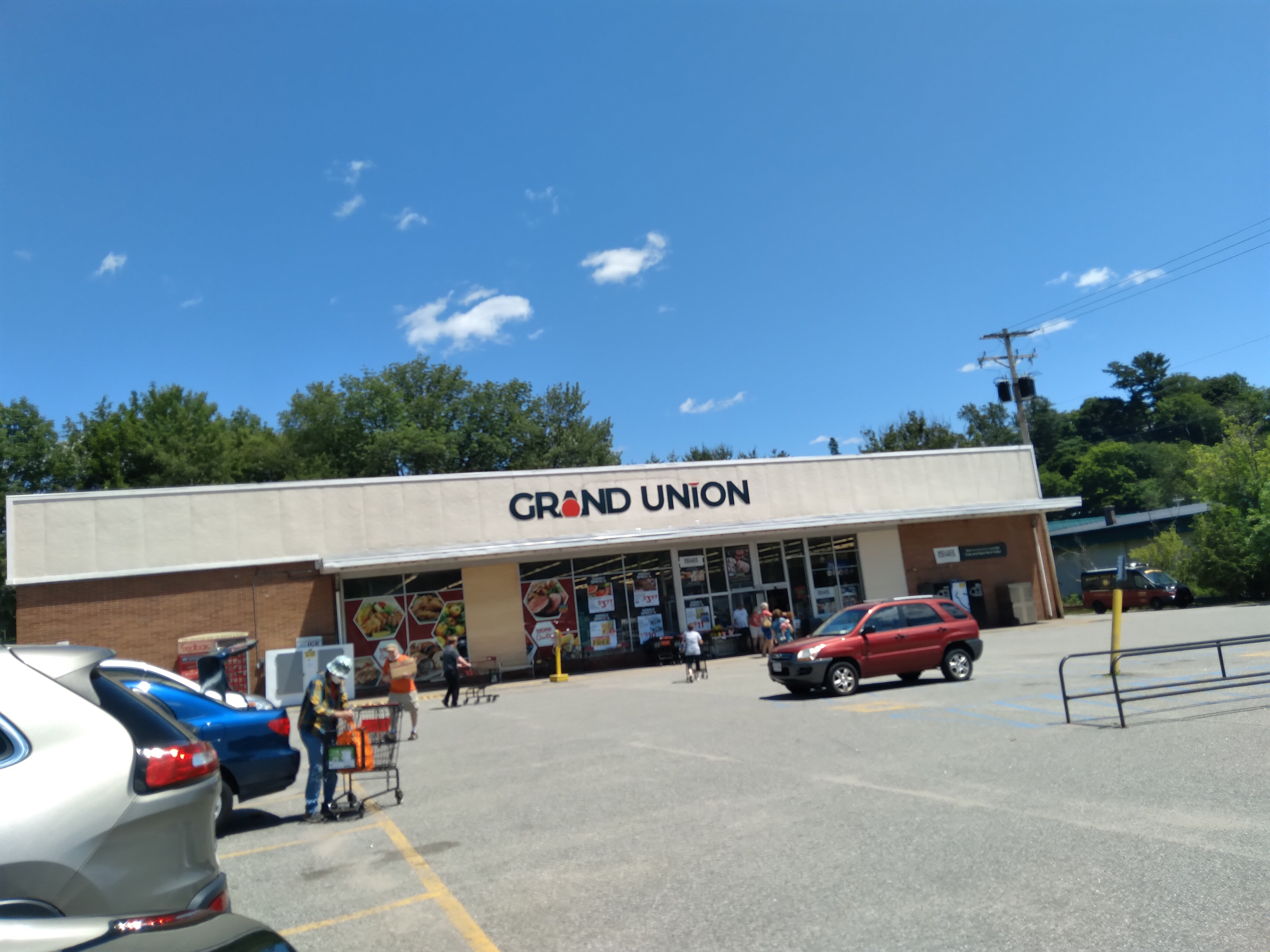
- Grand Union supermarket in Saranac Lake, New York, 2022
- Type: Private
- Industry: Retail; Grocery
- Founded: Scranton, Pennsylvania, U.S. (1872, as Jones Brothers Tea Company) (Original), November 9, 2021 (Revival)
- Founder: Cyrus D. Jones
- Defunct: July 2, 2013 (Original)
- Fate: The original company was purchased by C&S Wholesale Grocers in 2001 and downsized. The remainder of the company was purchased by Tops Markets in 2012 and folded into the Tops brand in 2013. After Tops and Price Chopper merged operations, C&S purchased some of the stores the companies had to divest and relaunched Grand Union.
- Headquarters: Scranton, Pennsylvania (original); 68 Jay Street, Brooklyn, New York (??–1951??); Elmwood Park, New Jersey (1951–1987); Wayne, New Jersey (1987–2001); Clifton Park, New York (2001–2013); Depew, New York (from time of acquisition by Tops)
- Number of locations: 3 (2026)
- Website: grandunion.com

Grand Union Supermarkets, later known as Grand Union Family Markets and often referred to simply as Grand Union, is an American chain of grocery stores that does business in upstate New York and Vermont, and used to do business throughout most of the northeastern United States. It operated stores in other areas of the country, including the midwestern and southeastern states, and internationally in the Caribbean and Canada. The company was founded and headquartered in Scranton, Pennsylvania, and moved to Brooklyn, New York, in the early 20th century. Grand Union moved again to Elmwood Park, New Jersey, and finally to Wayne, New Jersey, before the company was forced into Chapter 7 bankruptcy in 2001 and sold to C&S Wholesale Grocers.

After C&S bought Grand Union, it down-scaled most of its operations, keeping only a number of stores in upstate New York and New England open. The chain was sold to Tops Friendly Markets in 2012; in 2013 Tops rebranded the remaining Grand Union stores with the Tops logo and the Grand Union name was discontinued. After Tops and Price Chopper Supermarkets merged in 2021, the combined entity was forced to sell 12 stores to meet regulatory approval, and on November 9, 2021, C&S announced that they were purchasing the 12 stores and would convert them to Grand Union stores, reviving the brand.

== History ==
=== Origins ===
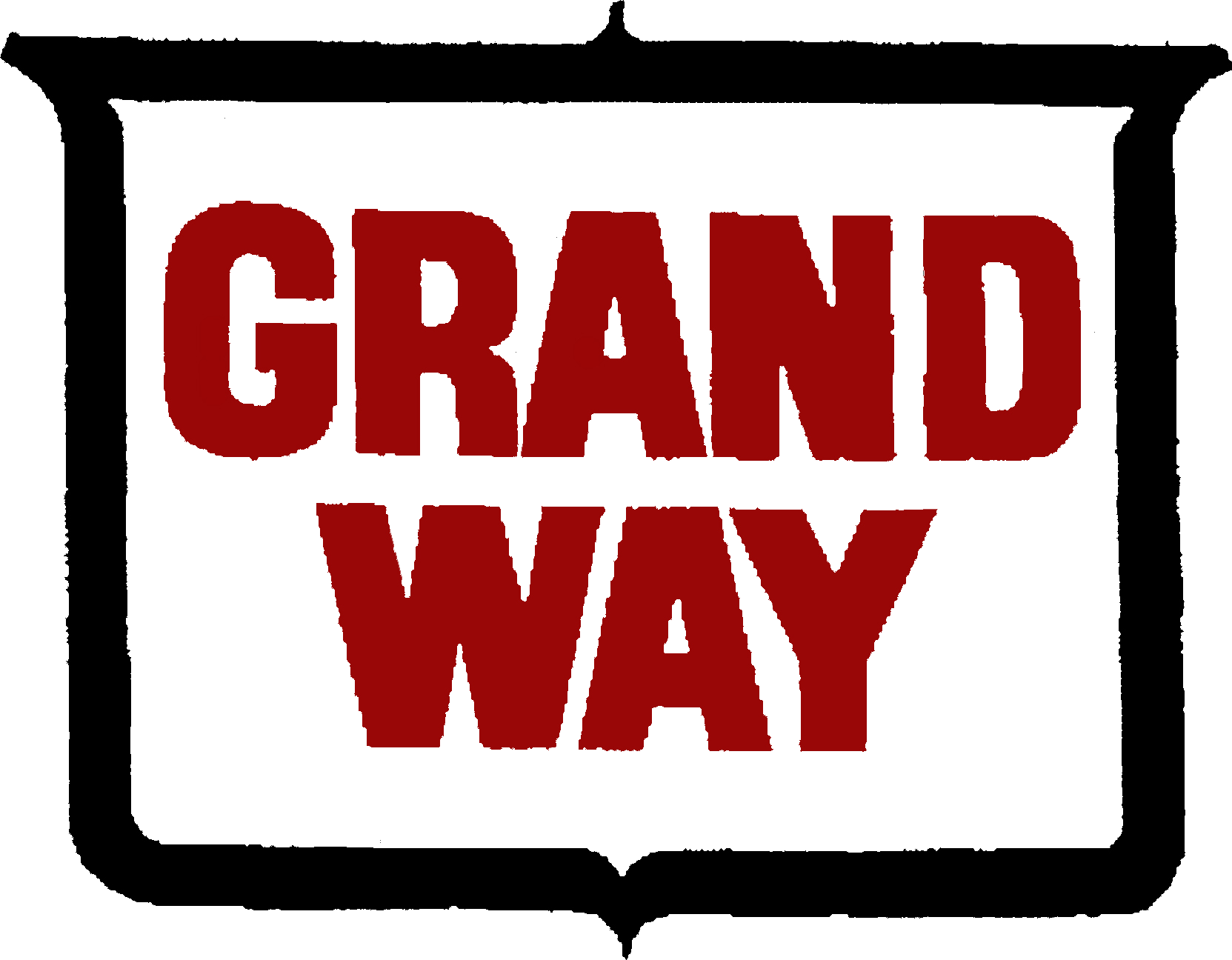
Grand Way discount stores logo

Grand Union's famous "red dot" logo. Introduced in the 1980s as part of a rebranding, it ceased to be the company's logo following C&S' purchase of the company.

Grand Union started in Scranton, Pennsylvania, as the Jones Brothers Tea Company in 1872. By the 1930s it was one of the largest grocery chains in the United States. The name "Grand Union" was inspired by the desire to "unite shoppers with low prices in a 'Grand Union of Value'" as described by company associate Elvin Sanders. The store's mascot was Abraham Lincoln wearing a deli apron, and most stores featured a costumed Lincoln to accomplish deeds, talk to customers, and proclaim the general splendor of the Grand Union, and to urge them to "Save the Union" when the company faced economic hardship.

In the early 1950s, Grand Union merged with Great Eastern and began construction on a new shopping center in what was then known as East Paterson (now Elmwood Park), New Jersey. The strip was to include a new Grand Union store with an office tower attached that would serve as the company's new corporate headquarters. The store and new headquarters opened in 1951. In 1987, Grand Union moved its corporate headquarters to Willowbrook Center in Wayne, abandoning its Elmwood Park offices. Grand Union did not close the Elmwood Park store, though, and it remained in operation until 2001.

In 1956, Grand Union opened a discount department store chain (called Grand Way) in Keansburg, New Jersey. Many of these stores combined a grocery store and a department store, which was similar to the combination Bradlees and Stop & Shop stores that were around during that time as well. Others were separate stores. For instance, a multi-level Grand Way store was built on a vacant lot across from the Elmwood Park corporate headquarters while the company built a strip mall in nearby Paramus, where the Grand Way anchored one end with the Grand Union anchoring the other. These stores were eventually closed and sold to other competitors, such as Winn-Dixie. The Elmwood Park and Paramus Grand Way stores were sold to Kmart; both stores were closed during Kmart's massive downsizing, with the Elmwood Park store being demolished and replaced by a ShopRite supermarket owned by Inserra Supermarkets.

In 1959, Grand Union's 38 stores it operated in Ontario, Canada, were sold to Steinberg's (supermarket), a Quebec-based supermarket and department store chain. Those locations were quickly rebranded into Steinberg's grocery stores, but over time most of their former Grand Union stores were closed and moved to new stores, due to poor locations compared to local competitors.

=== Ownership by "The Red Raider" James Goldsmith ===
British corporate raider Sir James Goldsmith acquired Grand Union in the early 1970s through his food conglomerate Cavenham Foods. Grand Union was a money loser during much of Goldsmith's time of ownership. Goldsmith presided over the closing of the Grand Way chain in 1978 and the exit of Grand Union from most of the rest of the nation outside of the Northeast and New England in the mid-1980s.

In the 1980s Grand Union acquired many former A&P stores in northern New Jersey that A&P closed after acquiring the metropolitan New York operations of Stop & Shop and a controlling stake in the southern grocery chain Big Star Markets. In October 1986, Grand Union leased ten stores in the Albany area from Weis Markets, including nine stores that had operated under the Albany Public Markets banner. In the mid-1980s, Goldsmith brought in former Target Corporation executive Floyd Hall to manage the chain. Goldsmith also had world-renowned artist Milton Glaser complete a graphical redesign of the chain, which included the "red dot" theme. Through the new management under Hall, the chain was able to make record-making profits throughout the late 1980s. In 1987, Goldsmith sold his shareholding in Grand Union's parent company, Generale Occidentale to French conglomerate Compagnie Générale d'Electricité (CGE), and in 1988 CGE sold Grand Union to a management buyout led by Hall for $655 million.

=== 1989 acquisition by Gary Hirsch ===
In 1989, investment banker Gary D. Hirsch, a partner in the firm Miller Tabak Hirsch & Co. acquired a portion of the Grand Union Company with Salomon Brothers. Grand Union was Hirsch's fourth major supermarket purchase since 1987, as he had acquired the Pennsylvania-based Penn Traffic, the Syracuse, New York–based P&C Foods, and the Columbus, Ohio-based Big Bear Stores in the previous two years. Hirsch assumed the position of chairman while Joseph McCaig became CEO. Floyd Hall left upon the acquisition.

Under Hirsch's leadership the company was driven into serious debt and ran out of the necessary capital for store improvements and upgrades, making it difficult for them to compete with other better financed retailers. Still, gradually, Grand Union remodeled most of its stores. Some of its older, run-down stores were closed and converted to other uses. Grand Union's big disadvantage was that its average store was 35,000 square feet while most supermarkets being built were over 50,000. The company also built a few larger stores.

In 1995, Grand Union's ongoing financial difficulties forced the company into its first bankruptcy as it filed for Chapter 11. In 1996, shortly after Grand Union emerged, Hirsch announced his resignation and sold his share of the company.

Logo as Grand Union Family Markets

=== The J. Wayne Harris era ===
In 1997, Grand Union brought in J. Wayne Harris to begin a turnaround of the ailing chain. Harris had recently been an executive at A&P and at Kroger, and had an excellent reputation in the industry.

Harris immediately began remodeling stores and building larger ones, which put even more stress on the company's finances and forced another Chapter 11 filing in 1998. The company emerged again in 1999 and had $175 million in new capital, which Harris used to finish the remodels on the stores that were still in the process and to acquire more construction permits for larger stores. He also used some of the money for new store formats, with three emerging. One was "Grand Union Fresh Market", which catered more to an upscale gourmet clientele more in the vein of its competitor Kings. Another was a discount grocery store named "Mega Save". A third was Grand Union's answer to limited selection chains such as Aldi and Save-A-Lot, called "Hot Dot".

None of these ideas worked out, and again Grand Union's finances reached dire straits. In addition to this, many of Grand Union's executives were found to have been stealing money such as Don Vaillancourt, who was convicted of embezzling over $2 million from the company in 2002. Harris was forced out in 2000 and took a job with JCPenney, who hired him to revive their Eckerd drugstore chain. Harris failed to do that as well, and Eckerd was sold to a combination of Jean Coutu Group and CVS Corporation in 2004.

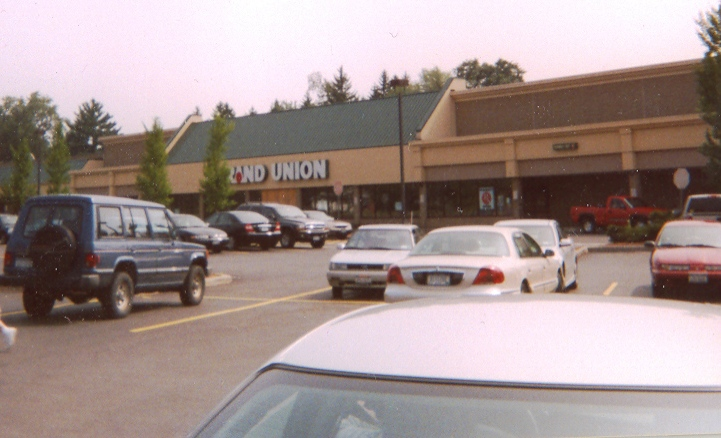
A Grand Union store in Glenmont, New York, in 2004

In addition to the now-critical debt being borne by Grand Union, the company was unable to build the stores it wanted to as there was not enough money left. A Fishkill, New York store was sold to a ShopRite ownership group before it could open, and the construction of a store in its home area of Wayne, New Jersey, was halted for over a year.

In October 2000, Grand Union filed for Chapter 11 bankruptcy for a third time. Two months later, the bankruptcy was converted to a Chapter 7 bankruptcy after it was discovered that the damage Harris' failed ideas and the embezzlement scandal had done to the company left it with so little money that Grand Union could not operate or supply any of its stores. A search for a buyer began, but in spite of the filing the stores continued to do business as before.

=== 2001 acquisition by C&S Wholesale Grocers ===
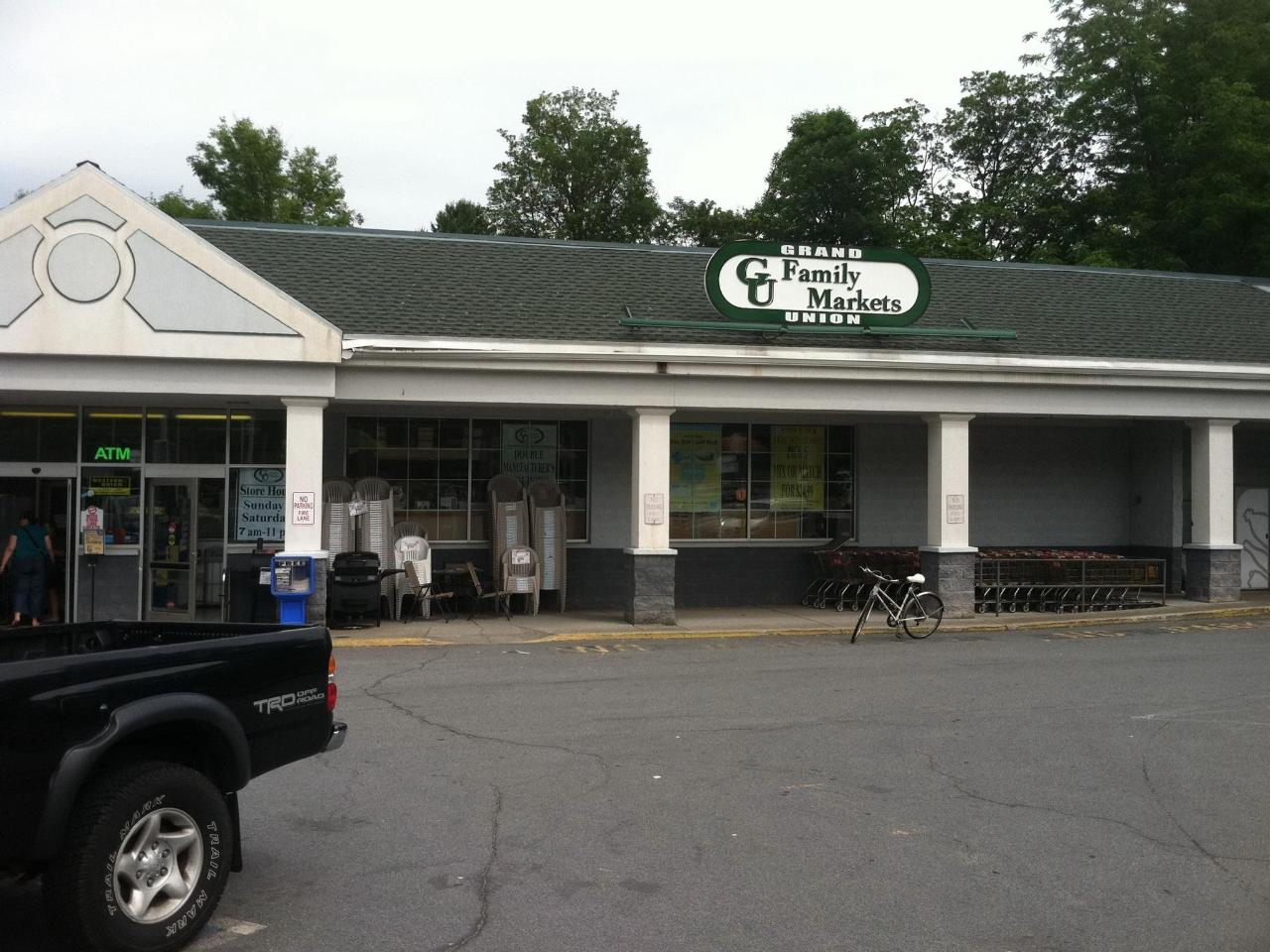
2011 photo of a Grand Union store in Bolton Landing, New York; now a Tops

Grand Union's Chapter 7 filing had a large effect on its supplier C&S Wholesale Grocers, a New England–based wholesale food distributor of which Grand Union was its largest customer. C&S also was one of Grand Union's largest creditors, and made a stalking horse offer to take control of the company in early 2001 that was approved.

Shortly afterward, C&S began reorganizing Grand Union's operations. This resulted in a consolidation that left the chain with only a relatively small number of stores in smaller cities and towns across Upstate New York and New England. In addition, Grand Union's stores in the Northeast, where it was long established, were closed. Many of the medium-sized and most of the larger Grand Union stores, as well as most of the construction permits for stores that had yet to be built or finished, were sold to Ahold while C&S continued to supply the stores. At the time of the acquisition of Grand Union by C&S, Ahold had been looking to establish a presence in the Northeast as well through its Edwards Super Food Stores chain and was initially a bidder for Grand Union. Eventually Ahold converted the Edwards stores to Stop & Shop, reintroducing the brand to the area, and later converted the Grand Union stores it acquired to Stop & Shops as well. Ahold began supplying Grand Union stores for some time prior to their rebranding. This meant that although the store retained the Grand Union sign on the outside and various other signage on the inside, it had Stop & Shop branded items on the shelves.

Other supermarket chains that purchased Grand Union stores included Tops, which was at the time also an Ahold subsidiary, Shaw's, Hannaford, Price Chopper and Pathmark. Some of the other medium-sized stores were sold to department store chains such as Marshalls and Kohl's, while many of the smaller stores were sold to independent grocers and drugstore chains such as Eckerd, Rite Aid, CVS, and Walgreens. Other stores, like the former flagship in Elmwood Park, were demolished after closing and replaced with other buildings.

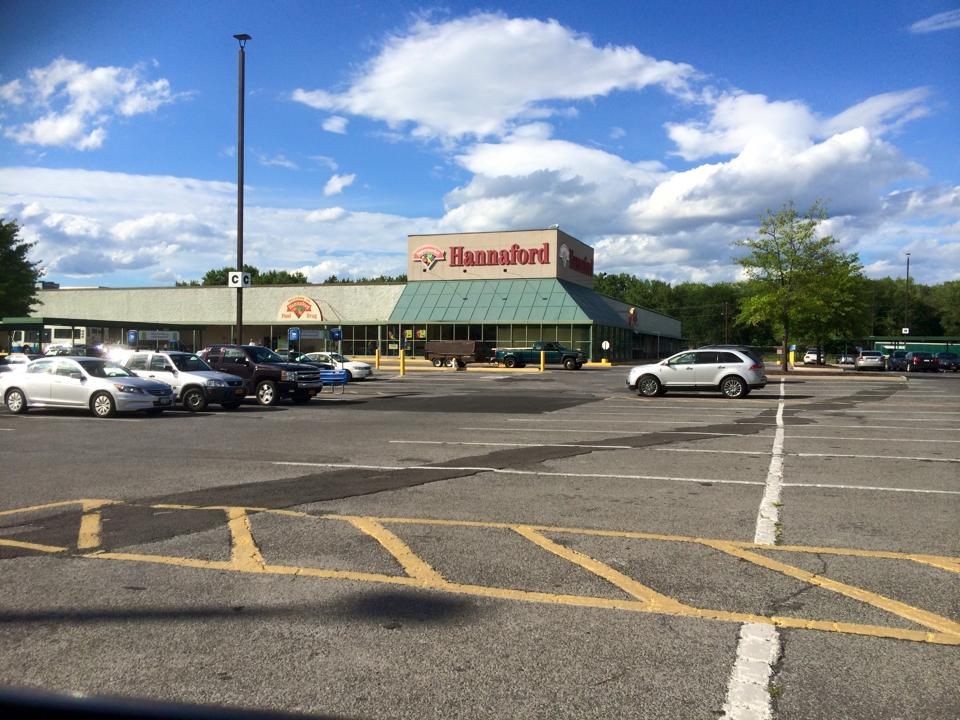
The Kingston, New York store was one of five stores sold to Hannaford following Grand Union's bankruptcy.

As for the stores that remained under the Grand Union banner, they became part of a rebranded Grand Union Family Markets, complete with a new logo that discarded the 1980s "Red Dot" logo. Many of the stores did keep the Red Dot, although not all of them did.

=== Acquisition by Tops Friendly Markets ===
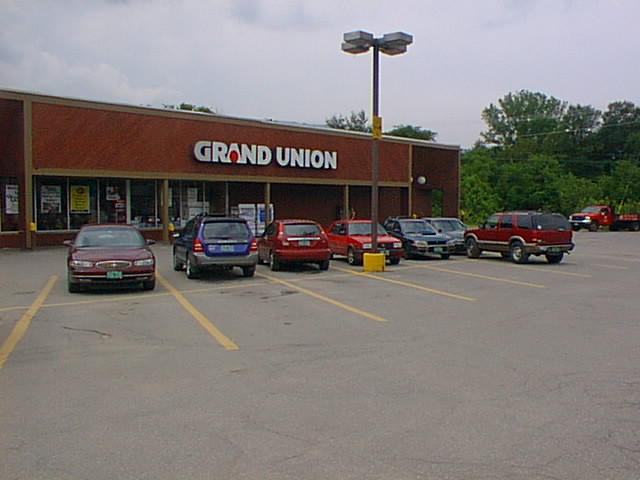
2006 photo of a Grand Union store in Johnson, Vermont

On July 19, 2012, Tops Friendly Markets announced that it would acquire the 21 remaining Grand Union stores in the Adirondack Region and parts of Vermont. The terms of the deal were not disclosed. On May 28, 2013, grand reopening ceremonies were held for nine stores which had been re-bannered under the Tops name. The remaining 12 stores held grand reopening ceremonies on July 2, 2013, under the Tops banner, effectively bringing an end to the Grand Union supermarket chain.

=== 2021 revival of the brand ===
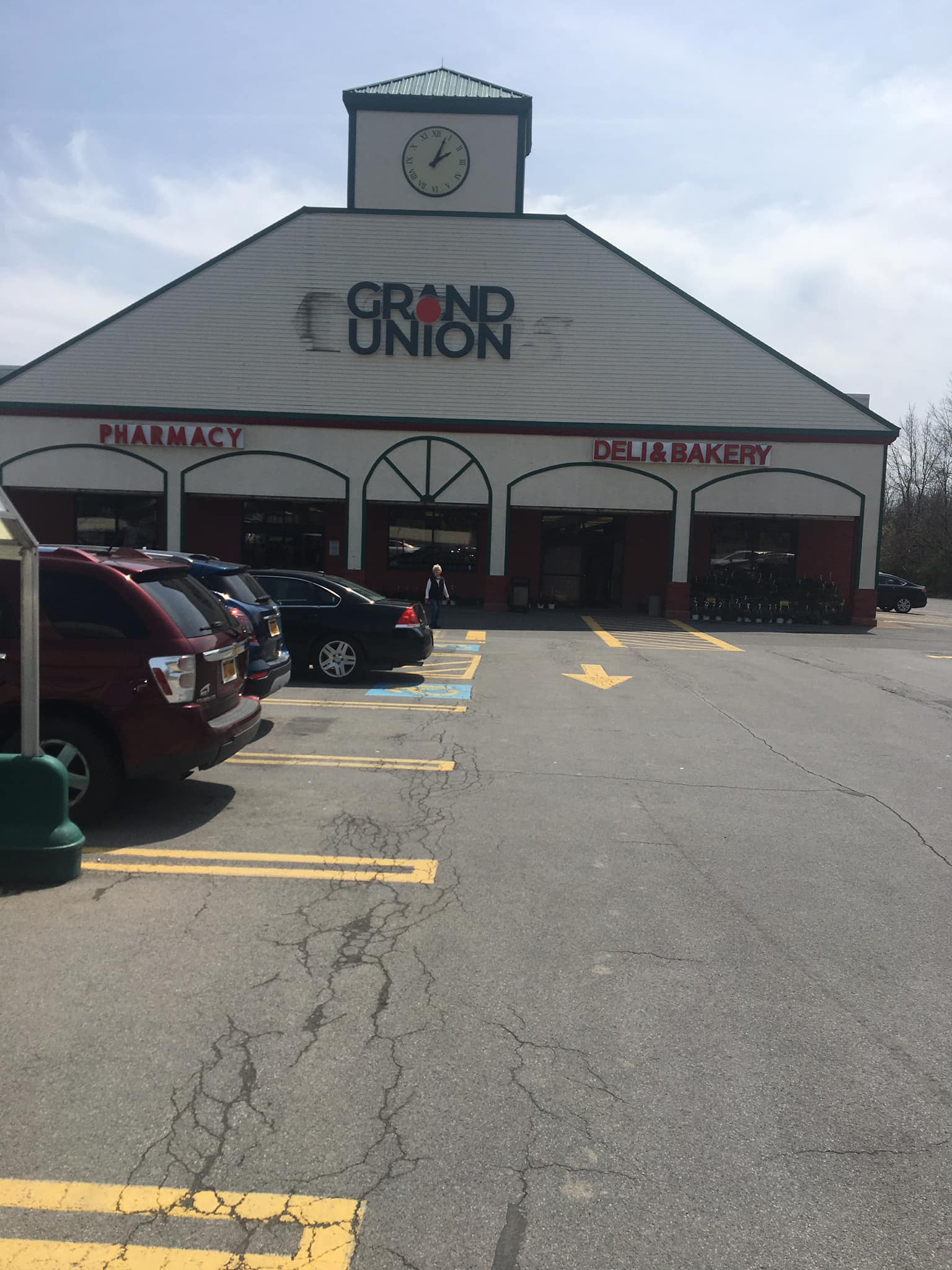
This Grand Union in Sherrill, New York was one of the twelve stores sold by Tops to C&S.

In 2021, it was announced that, as part of the Tops and Price Chopper Supermarkets merger, the combined entity had to sell 12 stores to meet regulatory approval. On November 9, 2021, C&S announced that they were purchasing the 12 stores and converting them to Grand Union stores, reviving the brand. As part of the announcement, it was initially revealed that those 12 stores will be converted to Grand Union and that the grand openings will be from mid-January through mid-February 2022. However, one store in Watertown, New York went to Piggly-Wiggly instead.

In March 2025, the Grand Union in Owego closed. In January 2026, five stores were set to close by March, leaving them with just five stores.

In September 2026, Grand Union announced the closure of their Cortland and Sherrill locations at the end of the year.
