= Tom Thumb (grocery store) =

American supermarket chain in Texas owned by Albertsons Companies, Inc

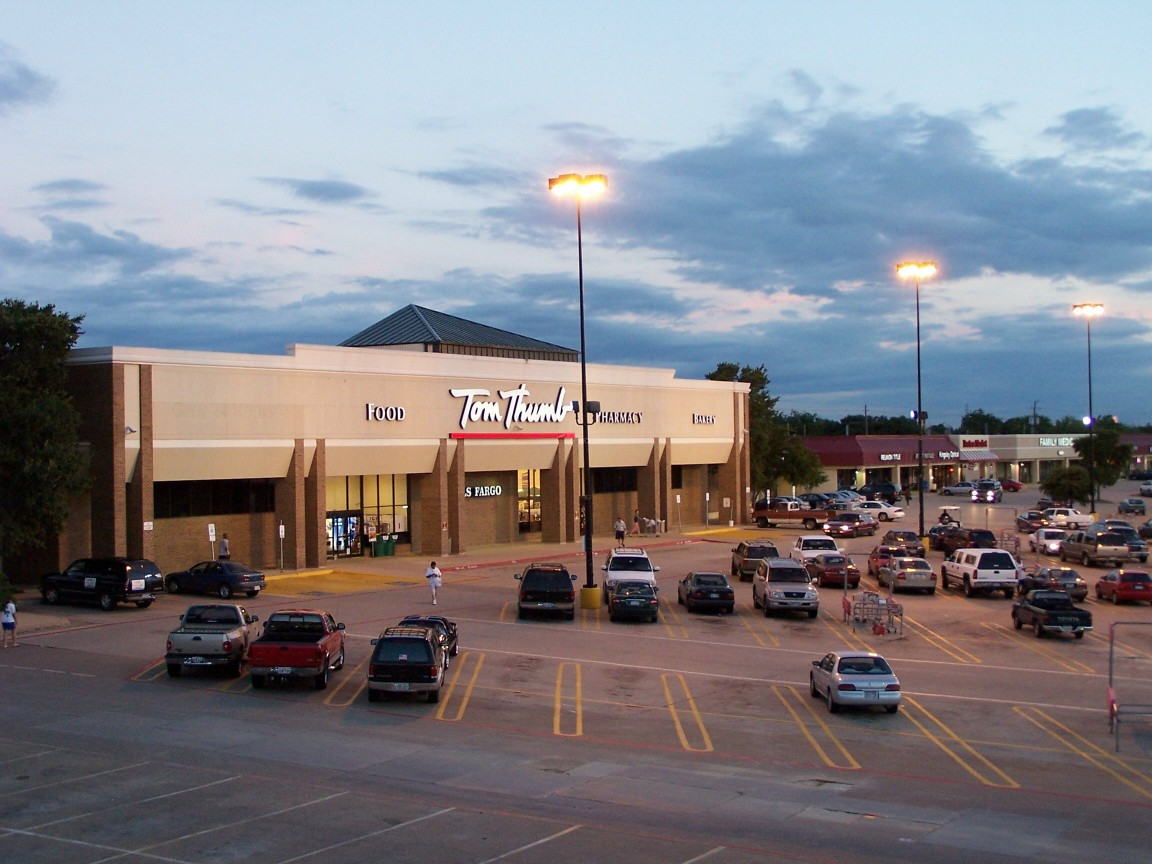
- Typical Tom Thumb Store Dallas, TX
- Company type: Subsidiary
- Industry: Retail / grocery
- Founded: 1948 (78 years ago) in Dallas, Texas, U.S.
- Founder: J.R. Bost; Robert B. Cullum
- Headquarters: Roanoke, Texas, U.S.
- Number of locations: 64
- Area served: Texas
- Key people: Paul McTavish (division president)
- Products: Bakery, dairy, delicatessen, dry cleaning, frozen foods, fuel, grocery, lottery, pharmacy, photographic processing, produce, meats, snack food, liquor and flowers
- Services: Supermarket
- Revenue: US$288 million (2021)
- Number of employees: ▲ Over 2,000
- Parent: Randalls (1992–1999); Safeway (1999–2015); Albertsons (2015–present)
- Website: www.tomthumb.com

Tom Thumb is a chain of supermarkets in the Dallas–Fort Worth metroplex. It operates under the name Tom Thumb for traditional grocery stores and Flagship Tom Thumb for higher end stores in affluent areas. It makes up part of the Southern division of Albertsons. When combined with sister chains Albertsons and Market Street, it is (as of May 2015) the number-two supermarket group in the competitive Dallas/Fort Worth area (in terms of market share) behind Walmart. The chain's distribution center is in Roanoke, Texas.

== History ==
Tom Thumb was founded in 1948 by J.R. Bost and Robert B. Cullum as Tom Thumb Food Stores, after Bost and Cullum acquired six Toro supermarkets (Cullum was grocery supplier to Toro when Toro folded, and the owner fled the country). It was once a publicly traded company on the NYSE under the name Cullum Companies.

By 1956, the company had expanded to 20 stores and continued to grow, buying 34 Hinky Dinky stores in the Midwest, 17 Pantry Food Markets in California, and Page Drug Stores (Tom Thumb added the "Page" to their store names after the acquisition). The freestanding Page stores were later sold to Eckerd Drugs. Tom Thumb also bought the gourmet specialty Simon David stores in 1963. Its reach expanded further when the grocer entered the Austin, Texas, market in 1972.

Tom Thumb partnered with Wal-Mart in 1987 to create several Hypermart USA in Garland, Texas, and Arlington, Texas. Hypermart USA stores were the early, smaller prototype for the current Walmart Supercenter concept. Their initial lack of success led Tom Thumb to exit the partnership in 1991.

In January 1989, Cullum Companies sold six of its Tom Thumb stores in Austin to Albertsons.

The company was acquired by the Randalls chain of Houston in 1992 and adopted a logo similar to Randalls, but retained the Tom Thumb name. Randalls converted the seven Tom Thumb stores in the Austin market to Randalls in January 1994, the same time it acquired and converted nine AppleTree Markets. The Simon David in the Arboretum Market was not converted, but it closed in December 1996 and was converted into a Saks Fifth Avenue then to a Trader Joe's in June 2014. After many customers lamented the loss of Austin's only Simon David, though, Randalls decided in 1998 to make its Bee Caves store a Flagship Randalls supermarket, the first in the city and the eighth in the chain.

In 1999, Randalls Food Markets was acquired by Safeway. Safeway retained the Randalls name in Houston and Austin and the Tom Thumb name in Dallas/Fort Worth, but replaced many of the Tom Thumb/Randalls "Remarkable" and President's Choice store brands with Safeway private label items. Randalls Food Markets became Safeway's Texas division, which today is legally known as Randalls Food and Drugs.

By 2001, Randalls operated 69 stores in the Dallas/Ft. Worth area under the Tom Thumb and Simon David banners.

In early 2005, Safeway was rumored to be attempting to sell the then 138-store Randalls division. Instead, Safeway announced by the end of the year it would close 15 Randalls stores in the Houston area, one in Austin, and nine Tom Thumb stores in the Dallas–Fort Worth area. Following the closures, Randalls operated 62 Tom Thumb stores in Dallas. Safeway said the move would revitalize the Texas division and that it planned to remodel stores to fit its "Lifestyle" format and introduce proprietary products. The new Lifestyle format features an expanded selection of perishables and a number of unique offerings, including a large selection of natural and organic foods, full-service meat counters, full-service bakeries, and floral design centers, as well as sushi and olive bars.

Beginning in 2006, some Tom Thumb stores began operating under Safeway's "Lifestyle Store" concept. Lifestyle stores carry an expanded selection of finer foods and ready-to-eat meals, and have a more upscale decor.. In January 2015, Safeway Inc. was acquired by Albertsons, and Tom Thumb (but not Randalls) was realigned under the Albertsons Southern Division. By this time, it had 57 stores operating under the Tom Thumb name. In March 2017, Albertsons announced that the Houston distribution center would close in late 2017 and all Texas stores (including Randalls) would be serviced from the Roanoke distribution center.

== Loyalty program ==
Tom Thumb offers a loyalty card (Reward Card) similar to many shoppers’ card programs. The loyalty card is currently good at all Albertsons Companies-owned stores. During the period after Tom Thumb was purchased by Randalls, but before Randalls was purchased by Safeway, the card was accepted at both Tom Thumb and Randalls locations. The original Reward Card program was based on the Promise Club program originally developed by Tom Thumb beginning in 1985. The Promise Club program included "Electronic Checks" (EFT), special discounts for card users, prizes based on points accrued while shopping with the card, and direct-mail advertising to cardholder's homes.
