= Safeway =

American supermarket chain owned by Albertsons Companies, Inc

Safeway, Inc.

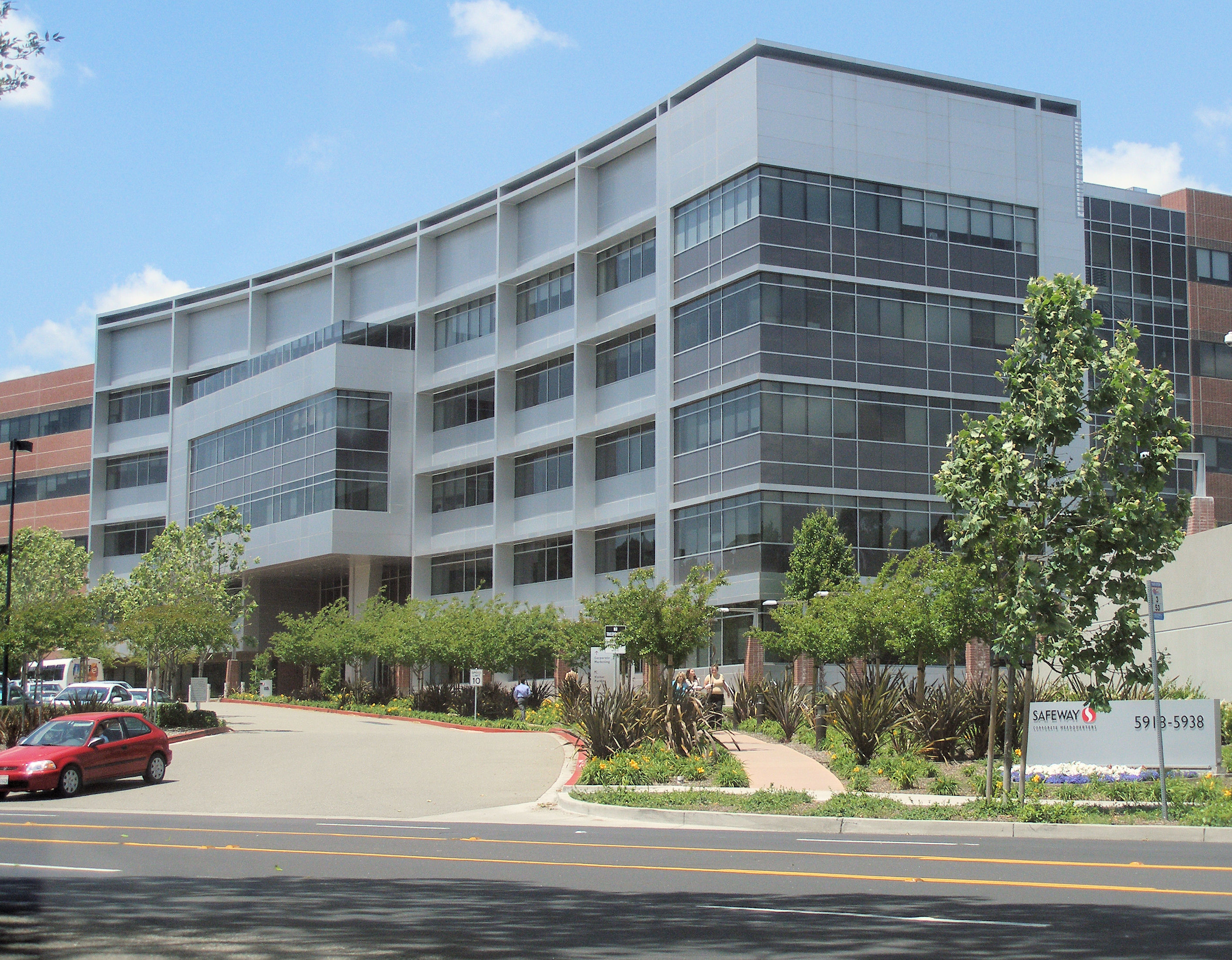
- Safeway headquarters in Pleasanton, California, United States
- Type: Subsidiary
- Traded as: NYSE: SWY
- Industry: Retail / grocery
- Founded: 1915; 111 years ago
- Founder: M. B. Skaggs
- Headquarters: Pleasanton, California, U.S.
- Number of locations: 912 stores (2025)
- Area served: Alaska, Arizona, California, Colorado, Delaware, District of Columbia, Hawaii, Idaho, Maryland, Montana, Nebraska, Nevada, New Mexico, Oregon, South Dakota, Virginia, Washington, and Wyoming
- Key people: Susan D. Morris (CEO)
- Products: Bakery, dairy, delicatessen, dry cleaning, frozen foods, fuel, grocery, lottery, pharmacy, photographic processing, produce, meats, snack food, liquor, flowers, and Western Union
- Services: Supermarket
- Total assets: US$17.2 billion
- Number of employees: ▲ Over 250,000 (2015, including Albertsons)
- Parent: Albertsons (2015–present)
- Website: safeway.com

Safeway, Inc. is an American supermarket chain that provides grocery items and general merchandise along with various specialty departments such as bakery, delicatessen, floral, and pharmacy, as well as Starbucks coffee shops and vehicle fuel centers. Safeway's primary base of operations is in the Western United States, with some stores located in the Mid-Atlantic region of the Eastern Seaboard.

It is a subsidiary of Albertsons after being acquired by private equity investors led by Cerberus Capital Management in January 2015. The subsidiary is headquartered in Pleasanton, California.

== History ==
Marion Barton Skaggs, who already had experience in the grocery business, moved to Portland, Oregon in 1921, and established four grocery stores. This chain of stores grew quickly, and Skaggs enlisted the help of his five brothers to grow the network of stores. By 1926, he had opened 428 stores bearing the family name in 10 states. He then almost doubled the size of his business that year when he merged his company with 322 Sam Seelig Company stores and incorporated as "Safeway, Inc." because he thought a corporate chain that would outlive him should not carry his name.

Safeway was chosen as the name because the stores operated exclusively on a cash-and-carry basis; they did not offer credit to customers, as American grocers traditionally had done. It was the "safe way" to buy food because a family could not get into debt via its grocery bill (as many families did at the time, a contributing cause of the Great Depression in the United States). Thus, the original slogan was: "Drive the Safeway. Buy the Safeway".

The 1926 merger came about because of Charles E. Merrill, the founder of the Merrill Lynch brokerage firm, who saw an opportunity to consolidate the West Coast grocery industry. Towards this end, he purchased the 322-store Safeway chain of W.R.H. Weldon, who wished to exit retailing and concentrate on wholesale. Then, in June 1926, Merrill offered Skaggs either $7 million outright or $1.5 million plus 30,000 shares in the merged firm. Skaggs took the latter. On July 1, 1926, Safeway merged with the 673 stores from Skaggs United Stores of Idaho and Skaggs Cash Stores of California. On completion of the Skaggs/Safeway merger, M. B. Skaggs became the Chief Executive of the business. Two years later, Skaggs listed Safeway on the New York Stock Exchange. In the 1930s, Safeway introduced produce pricing by the pound, adding "sell by" dates on perishables, nutritional labeling, and some of the first parking lots.

The merger instantly created the largest chain of grocery stores west of the Mississippi. At the time of the merger, the company was headquartered in Reno, Nevada. In 1929, it was relocated to a former grocery warehouse in Oakland, California, where it had the exclusive zip code of 94660. Safeway headquarters remained there until they moved to their new offices across from Stoneridge Mall in Pleasanton, California, in 1996. In the 1930s, Charles E. Merrill temporarily left Merrill Lynch to help manage Safeway.

In the late 1930s, the New Negro Alliance boycotted the Sanitary Grocery Company (then a Safeway subsidiary) to pressure store owners to employ black people, especially in predominantly black neighborhoods. The Sanitary Grocery Company successfully sought an injunction against the New Negro Alliance, which was upheld by the Washington, D.C., Court of Appeals. This led to the 1938 landmark U.S. Supreme Court decision of New Negro Alliance v. Sanitary Grocery Co., which defended the right to peaceful protest in the resolution of labor disputes.

In 1969, the Black Panther Party and the United Farm Workers launched simultaneous boycotts of Safeway grocery stores, which were the largest grocery store chain in the U.S. West at that time. The Panthers boycotted due to Safeway's refusal to donate to their Free Breakfast for Children Program, created to serve daily hot breakfasts to underprivileged children throughout the U.S. The United Farm Workers boycotted Safeway because the chain continued to sell California grapes despite the union's nationwide boycott. The Panthers and United Farm Workers also acted in solidarity with each other's goals in boycotting Safeway, including during a 1973 Panthers demonstration outside an Oakland Safeway store documented by KPIX Eyewitness news, in which protestors carried signs that read "Boycott Safeway, Boycott Grapes".

== Expansion ==
The initial public offering price of Safeway stock was $226 in 1927 (equivalent to $4,189 in 2025). A five for one split in 1928 brought the price down to under $50 (equivalent to $938 in 2025). Over the next few years, Charles Merrill, with financing supplied by Merrill Lynch, then began aggressively acquiring numerous regional grocery store chains for Safeway in a rollup strategy. Early acquisitions included significant parts of Piggly Wiggly chain as part of the breakup of that company by Merrill Lynch and Wall Street.

Year	Firm	# of stores	Location
1926	H.G. Chaffee	grocery stores	Southern California
1926	Skaggs Cash Stores	679 grocery stores	Idaho, California
1928	Arizona Grocery/Pay'n Takit Stores	24 grocery stores; 24 meat markets	Arizona
1928	Newway Stores	15 grocery stores; 11 meat markets	El Paso, Texas
1928	Sanitary Grocery (incl. some Piggly Wiggly)	429 grocery stores; 67 meat markets	Washington D.C. and Virginia
1928	Eastern Stores Inc.	67 grocery stores; 127 meat markets	Baltimore, Maryland
1928	Piggly Wiggly Pacific	91 grocery stores; 84 meat markets	Oakland, California
1928	Bird Grocery Stores (including some Piggly Wiggly)	224 grocery stores; 210 meat markets	Missouri, Texas, Arkansas, Iowa, Kansas, Nebraska
1929	Piggly Wiggly West	91 grocery stores; 84 meat markets	Northern California, Hawaii, Colorado
1929	Sun Grocery	91 grocery stores; 84 meat markets	Tulsa, Oklahoma
1931	MacMarr Stores	grocery stores	Los Angeles
1936	Stores from Kroger	53 grocery stores	Oklahoma
1941	Daniel Reeves Stores	498 grocery stores	New York
1941	National Grocery	84 grocery stores	New Jersey
1958	Thriftway Stores (Iowa)	30 grocery stores	Iowa
2016–2017	Andronico's	9 stores	San Francisco Bay Area

Most transactions involved the swap of stock certificates, with little cash changing hands. Most acquired chains retained their own names until the mid-1930s.

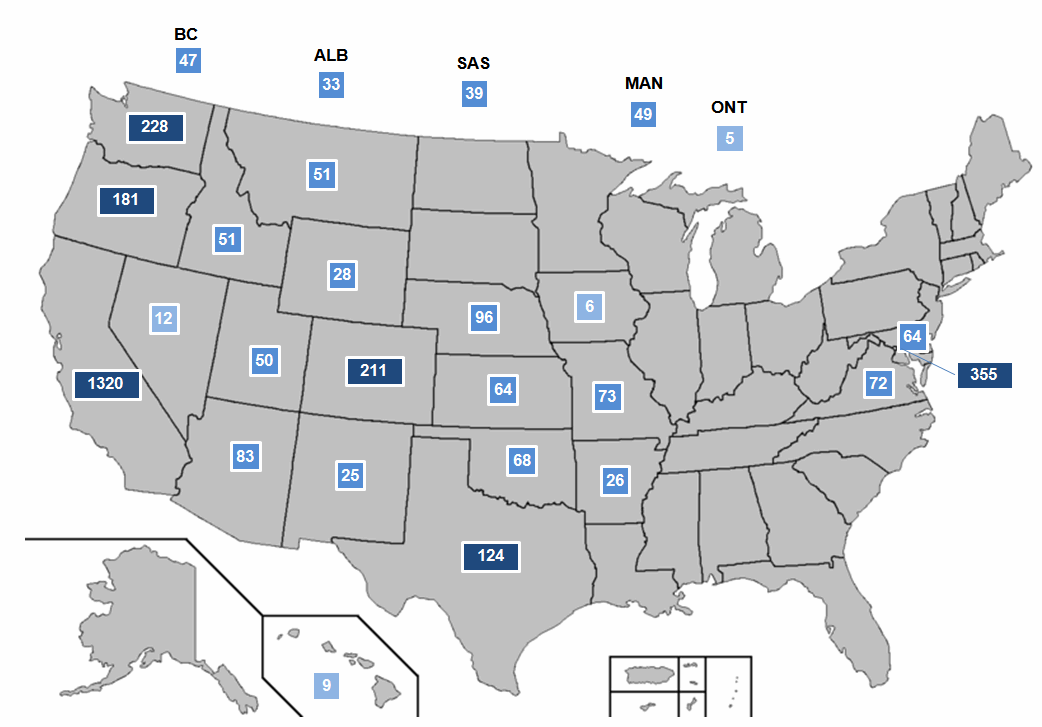
Safeway store numbers by state and province in 1932

In 1929, there were rumors of a Safeway-Kroger merger. In late 2022, 93 years later, this merger became another possibility with the announced merger of Albertsons Companies and Kroger Co.

The number of stores peaked at 3,400 in 1932, when expansion ground to a halt. The Great Depression had finally impacted the chain, which began to focus on cost control. In addition, numerous smaller grocery stores were being replaced with larger supermarket stores. By 1933, the chain ranked second in the grocery industry behind The Great Atlantic & Pacific Tea Company and ahead of Kroger.

In 1935, Safeway sold its nine stores in Honolulu, Hawaii, "because of the inconvenience of proper supervision". Also in 1935, independent groceries in California convinced the California legislature to enact a progressive tax on chain stores. Before the act took effect, Safeway filed a petition to have the law put to a referendum. In 1936, the California electorate voted to repeal the law.

In 1936, Safeway introduced a money back guarantee on meat.

=== International expansion ===
Country	Year	# of stores	
Canada	1929	213 (2013)	
United Kingdom	1962	131 (1986)	
Australia	1962	123 (1984)	187 (rebranded Woolworths 2008)
West Germany	1963	35 (1984)	
Mexico	1981	137 (2007)	
Saudi Arabia	1982	6 (1984)	
Jordan	2003	6 (2009)	

The company expanded into Canada in 1929 with 127 stores (which became Canada Safeway Limited and which was sold to Sobeys in 2013), into the United Kingdom in 1962 (which became Safeway plc), into Australia in 1963 (which became Safeway Australia), and into West Germany in 1964. The company also has operations in Saudi Arabia and Kuwait in a licensing and management agreement with the Tamimi Group during the 1980s. In 1981, it acquired 49% of Mexican retailer Casa Ley.

Safeway usually achieved international expansion by acquiring one or more small chains in a given country. It expanded into Saudi Arabia and Kuwait, however, through a joint venture. This initial nucleus of stores received Safeway systems and technology and then expanded organically. International chains acquired include:

Year	Firm	# of stores	Location
1929	Kroger (Canada)	9 grocery stores	Canada
1935	Piggly Wiggly (Canada)	179 stores	Canada
1962	John Gardner Limited	11 stores	United Kingdom
1963	Pratt Supermarkets	3 stores	Melbourne, Australia
1963	Mutual Stores	? stores	Australia
1964	Big Bär Basar (Big Bear Bazaar)	2 stores	West Germany
1980	Jack the Slasher	31 stores	Queensland, Australia
1981	49% of Casa Ley	? stores	Mexico

=== 1940s–1970s ===
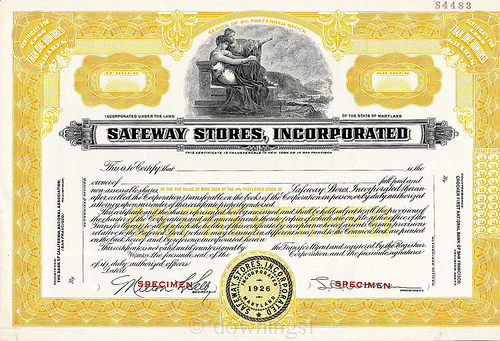
Safeway Stores 1955 Specimen Stock certificate

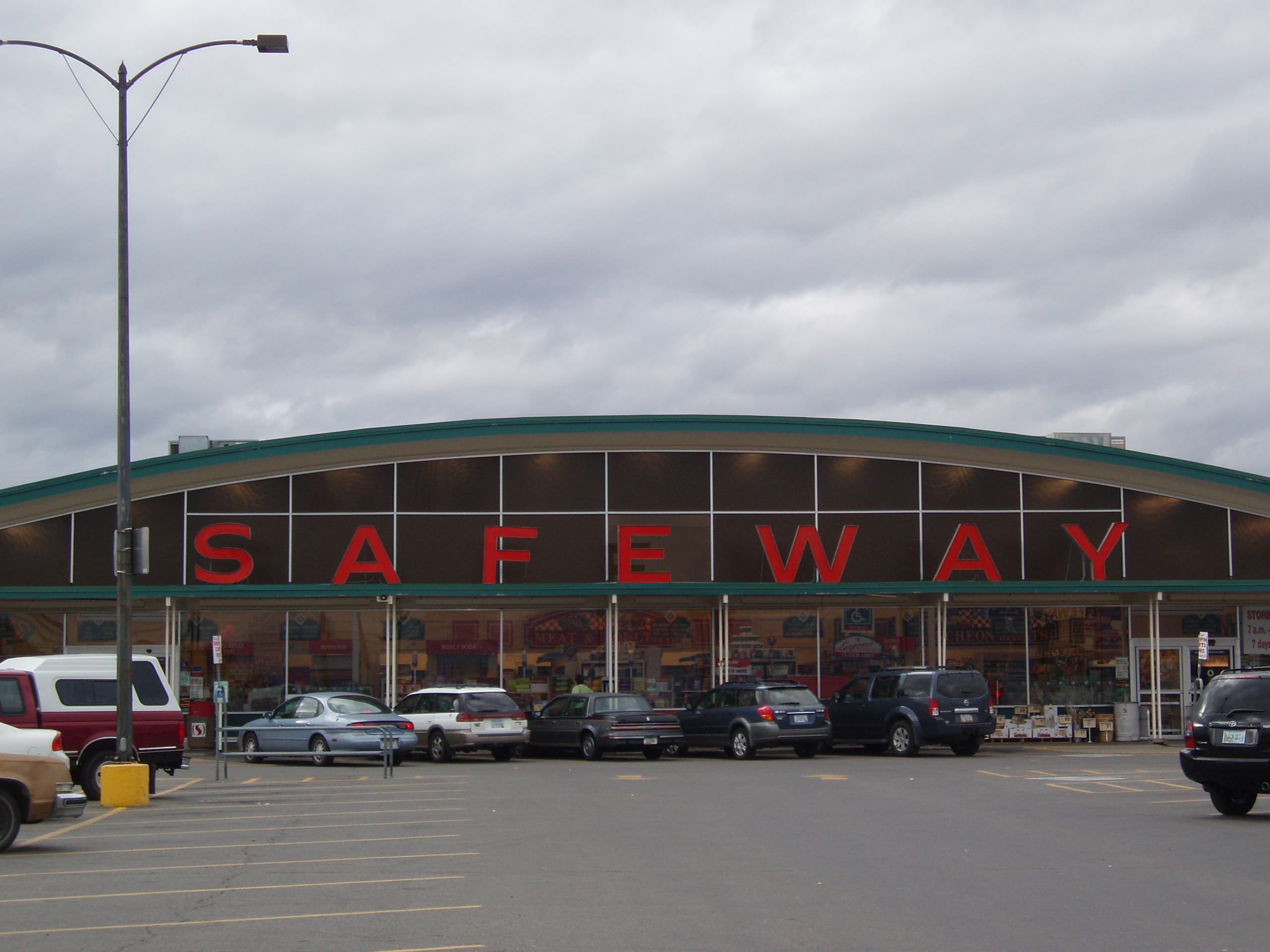
A "marina-style" Safeway in Hamilton, Montana, built in 1962. This still-operating store keeps the Marina design, but the red letters have been replaced with the current logo.

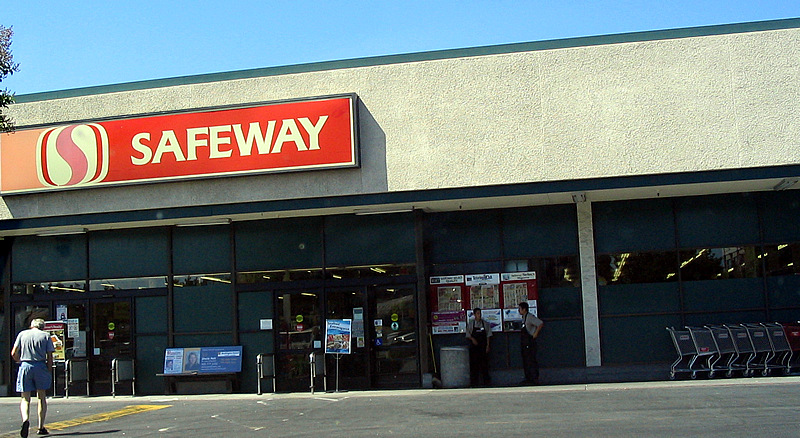
A Safeway store design from the 1970s, in San Jose, California, August 2005

In 1941, Marion B. Skaggs retired from the Safeway board of directors.

In 1947, the company's sales exceeded $1 billion for the first time. By 1951, total sales had reached nearly $1.5 billion. The company adopted the S logo, which it still uses, in 1962.

In 1955, Robert A. Magowan became Chairman of the Board of Safeway. Magowan had married Charles Merrill's daughter, Doris. Magowan also assumed the title of President in 1956. He remained president until 1968 and a member of the board until 1978. In 1966, Robert A Magowan brought his star meat processing plant manager, Michael F. Concannon, to Oakland to become the Head of Meat Processing in North America. He retired in 1978 as well. Mike was instrumental in opening the Stockton plant. The Wichita plant and meat processing in Canada began in the 1970s.

In 1959, Safeway opened its first store in the new state of Alaska – the first major food retailer to enter that market. The company opened three stores in Anchorage and one in Fairbanks over the next several years. The store in downtown Fairbanks was built on the site of a red-light district, known as The Line, which operated for close to a half century. Most of these stores were in buildings constructed by Anchorage real estate developer Wally Hickel, who later became governor of Alaska and U.S. Secretary of the Interior.

Also in 1959, designed by architects Wurster, Bernardi & Emmons, the firm also opened the first "marina-style" store on the Marina in San Francisco. The exterior mosaic murals on the east side of the building were created by John Garth. The murals depict food being transported from the four corners of the globe. Garth created murals for three other Safeway stores. Hundreds of stores in this barrel-vaulted-roof style opened during the next decade.

In 1961, the company sold its New York operations to Finast. In 1963, Safeway again opened stores in Hawaii, having exited this market in 1934. It leased one store in Culver City to animator/filmmaker Don Bluth, who used it as a theater until 1967.

In 1969, Safeway entered the Toronto market in Canada and the Houston market in Texas through opening new stores, rather than by acquisition. The firm ultimately failed against entrenched competition in both these markets.

In 1977, Safeway management instituted a program to fight counterfeit $100 bills by, among other things, telling employees that bills that lacked the words "In God We Trust" were counterfeit. Because Safeway had not sufficiently investigated the history of $100 bills, it was unaware that some bills still in circulation did not have the phrase. Eventually, an innocent shopper was incorrectly reported to Oakland, California, police for passing a "counterfeit" bill. He was arrested and strip-searched before Oakland police contacted the Treasury Department and realized the error. The 1981 jury verdict of joint and several liability for $45,000 against Safeway Stores and the City of Oakland was upheld in full by the Supreme Court of California on December 26, 1986.

In 1979, Peter Magowan, son of Robert Magowan and grandson of Charles Merrill, was appointed chairman and CEO of Safeway. Magowan managed Safeway for the next 13 years – presiding over the dramatic decline of the firm in terms of store numbers

=== 1980s: Takeover and sell-offs ===
Following a hostile takeover bid from corporate raiders Herbert and Robert Haft, the chain was acquired by Kohlberg Kravis Roberts (KKR) acting as a white knight in 1986. With the assistance of KKR, the company was taken private and assumed tremendous debt. To pay off this debt, the company began selling off a large number of its operating divisions.

Year	Division sold	# of stores	Sale price	Buyer	Outcome
1982	Omaha/Sioux Falls	64 stores	n/a	Multiple buyers including Hy-Vee & Fareway	Stores continue to operate as Hy-Vee (Omaha/Lincoln/Sioux Falls) and Fareway (Sioux City, IA)
1985	Southern Ontario	22 stores	n/a	Oshawa Group	Oshawa was acquired by Sobeys in 1998
1985	West Germany	36 stores	n/a	Bolle	Stores now part of Edeka
1987	Dallas	141 stores	n/a	Unable to sell whole division	Sold in pieces to Kroger, Brookshire's, Tom Thumb Food & Pharmacy (now owned by Safeway), Minyard Food Stores and Furr's; some stores shuttered
1987	Salt Lake City	60 stores	$75m	Farmer Jack	Farmer Jack sells stores in pieces at under book value in 1988 to Fleming and Albertsons; Farmer Jack acquired by A&P late 1988
1987	El Paso/Albuquerque	59 stores	$140m	Furr's Supermarkets (see Roy Furr)	Firm hits financial difficulties; MBO of some stores; other sold; bankruptcy in 2001
1987	Oklahoma	106 stores	n/a	MBO by management and Clayton, Dubilier & Rice forming Homeland (supermarket)	Firm listed then goes into bankruptcy in 1996. Later it was bought by and became a subsidiary of Associated Wholesale Grocers. AWG sold the Homeland chain to its employees in December 2011.
1987	Safeway UK	121 stores	US$1b	Argyll Foods	Stores continued to trade under Safeway name until 2005, when they were acquired by Morrisons
1987	Richmond	62 stores	n/a	various buyers	Division merged into Washington DC division (later Eastern Division), stores eventually sold off to competitors, including Farm Fresh
1988	Kansas City	66 stores	n/a	Morgan Lewis Githens & Ahn/W S Acquisition Corp.	Renamed Food Barn; bankruptcy 1994; stores sold to Associated Wholesale Grocers, which either closed or divested them to their members.
1988	Little Rock	51 stores	n/a	Acadia Partners	Renamed Harvest Foods; bankruptcy in 1995; stores sold off; some now part of Associated Wholesale Grocers after the demise of Affiliated Foods Southwest
1988	Houston	99 stores	$174.6m	MBO with Duncan Cook and Co. and the Sterling Group	Renamed AppleTree Markets; bankruptcy 1992; stores sold to competitors
1988	Southern California	172 stores	$408m	Vons	The $408m that Safeway acquired in the deal consisted of $325m in cash and 30 percent interest in Vons; Safeway later acquired 100 percent ownership in 1997

The divested domestic divisions of Safeway proved to be problematic for almost all those who acquired them. Essentially every purchasing entity hit financial troubles and either went bankrupt or was later acquired. (Hy-Vee and Fareway are the exceptions with the locations they acquired, having made them work.)

The international stores were more successful for their acquirers. Safeway plc, the operator of the UK stores, was sold to Argyll Foods, which itself was ultimately absorbed by Morrisons in 2004. Safeway Australia was sold to the Australian-based Woolworths in 1985.

Safeway sold its stores in Southern California, including those in established markets like Los Angeles and San Diego, to the Vons Companies in 1988 in exchange for a 30 percent interest in the company. Safeway also scaled back its operations in Fresno, Modesto, Stockton, and Sacramento. Save Mart Supermarkets purchased the few remaining Fresno Safeway stores in 1996.

Many stores in the Eastern Division were also closed or sold in the 1987–1989 time frame, including many recent additions in the DelMarVa Eastern Shore area.

Safeway's national presence was now reduced to several western states and Northern California, plus the Washington, D.C. area. Altogether, nearly half the 2,200 stores in the chain were sold.

=== Expansion in the 1990s ===
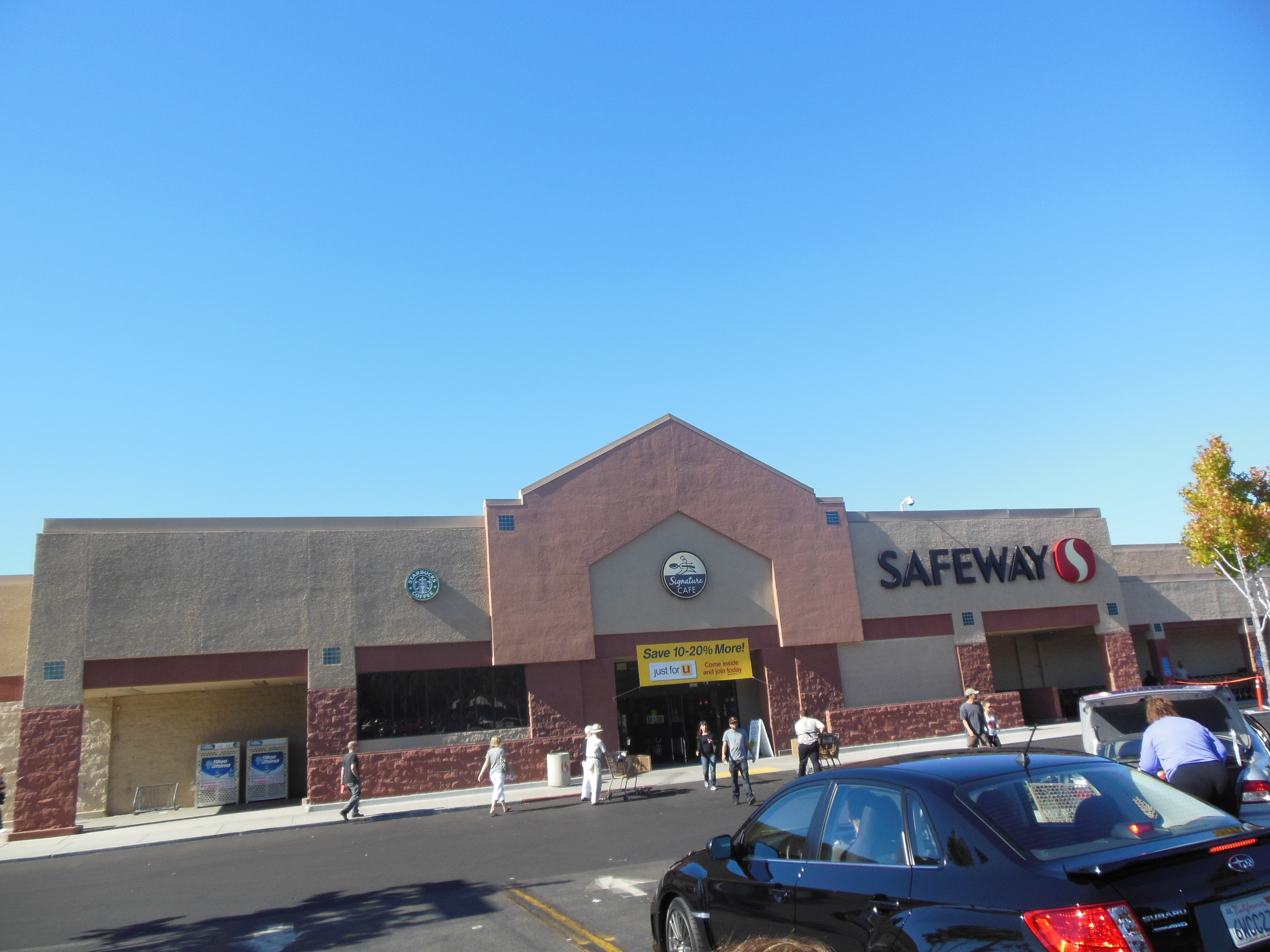
Safeway • 1663 Branham Lane, San Jose, CA 95118

The company was taken public again in 1990, with the Jordan stores sold to the Masri family in 1991. In December 2003, the Masri family sold it to The Sultan Center of Kuwait. The late 1990s and early 2000s once again saw Safeway rapidly expand into new territories under a variety of regional names. In 1997, Safeway bought out the rest of the Vons Companies, giving it Southern California stores once more. In 1998, Chicago-based Dominick's Finer Foods was acquired from Yucaipa Companies. While Safeway had stores in Alaska, in 1999 they bought Carrs-Safeway, with the same year bringing the purchase of Houston-based Randall's Food Markets, which also had stores in Austin, Texas. Randalls also had stores in the Dallas-Fort Worth area through Randalls' other brand, Tom Thumb, along with gourmet grocery store Simon David. The purchase of Randalls also started the practice of Safeway-owned gas stations, as Randalls already had stations at their stores.

In 2000, Safeway started grocery delivery operations and in 2001 acquired the family-owned Genuardi's chain, with locations in Pennsylvania, New Jersey, and Delaware. While Safeway also created the subsidiary Blackhawk Network, a prepaid and payments network, a card-based financial solutions company, and a provider of third-party prepaid cards, around this time, Genuardi's would be the last grocery purchase Safeway would make.

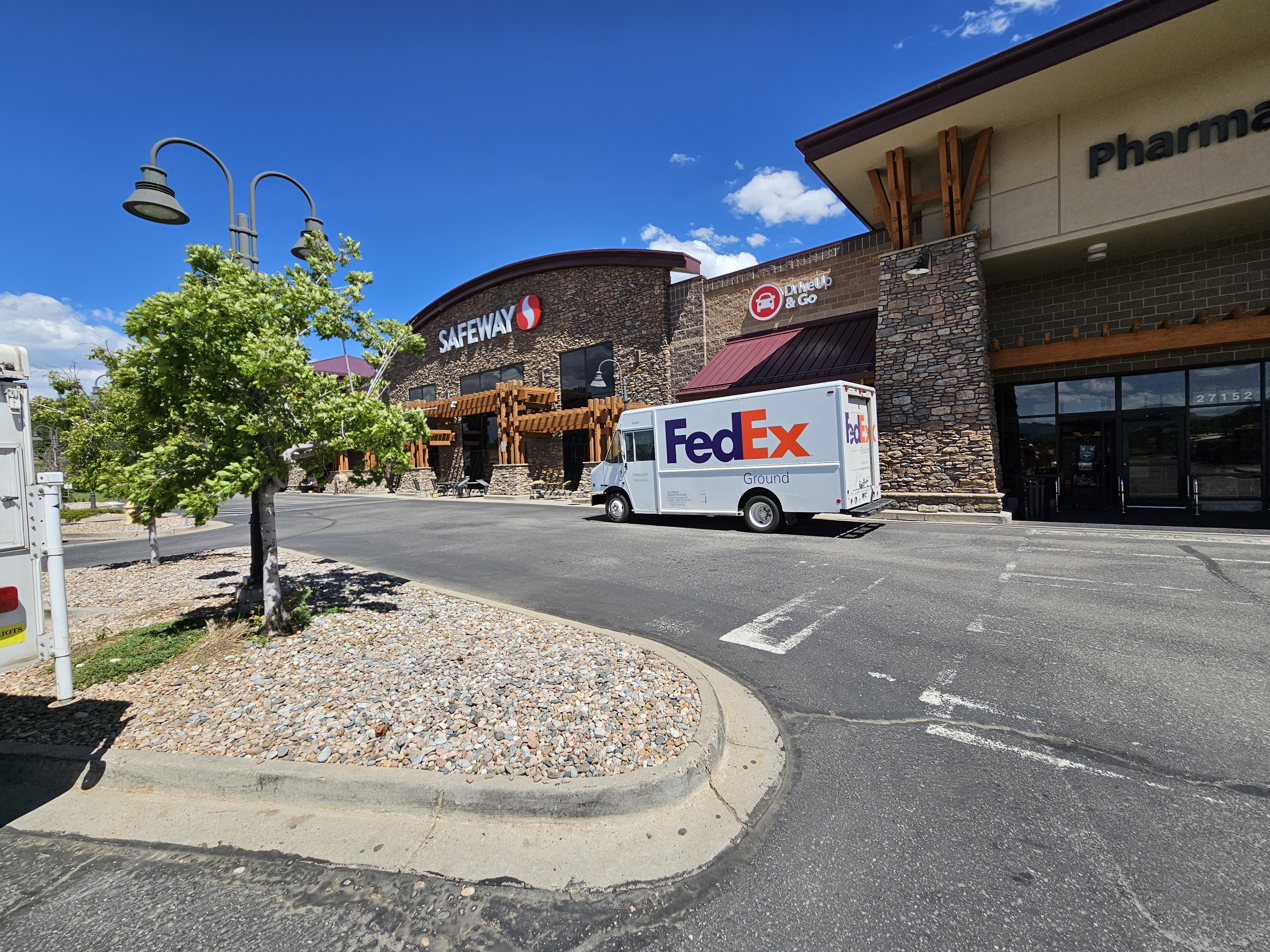
Safeway in Aspen Park, Colorado.

=== Lifestyle stores ===
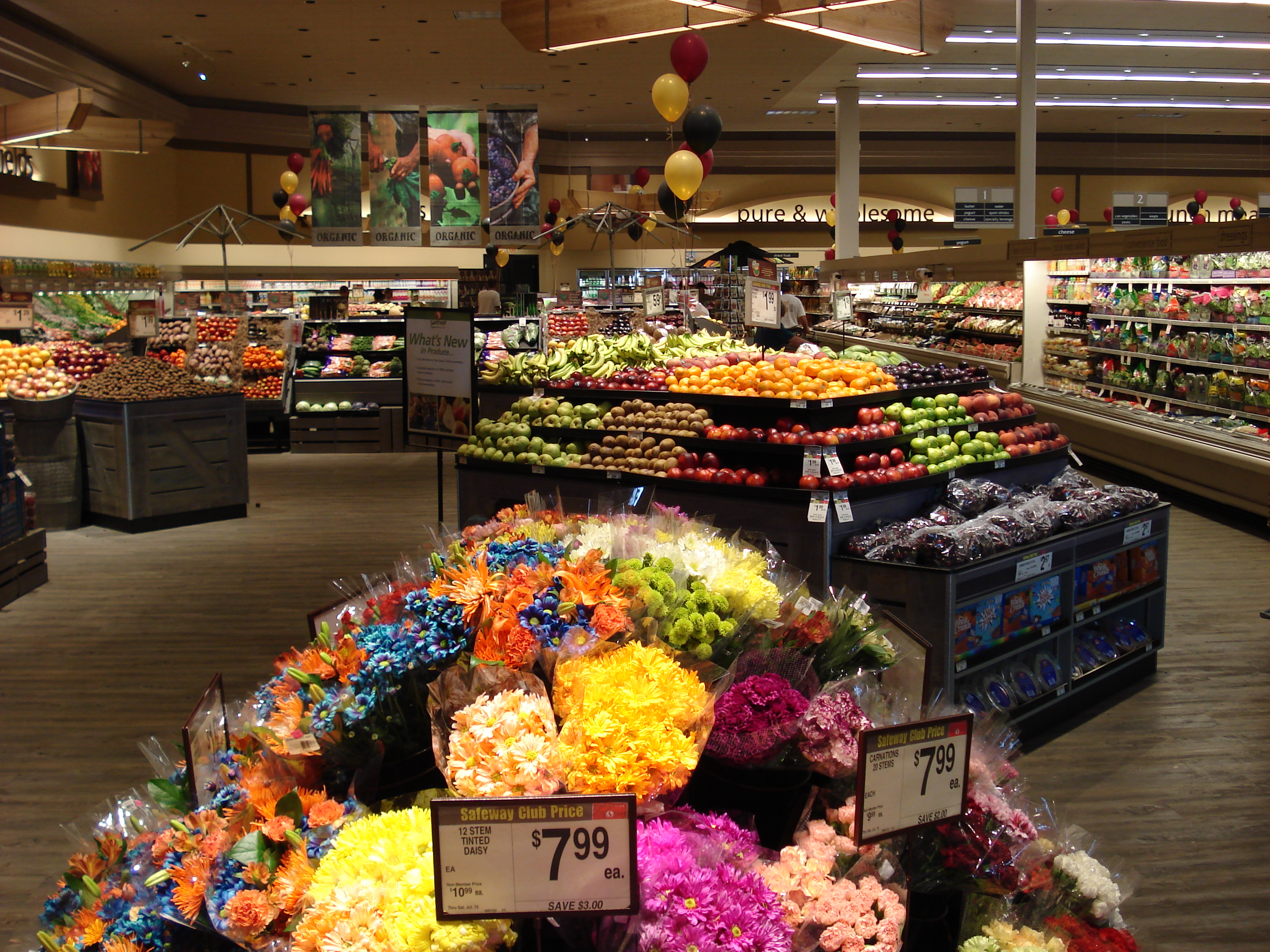
Safeway "Lifestyle" look produce department

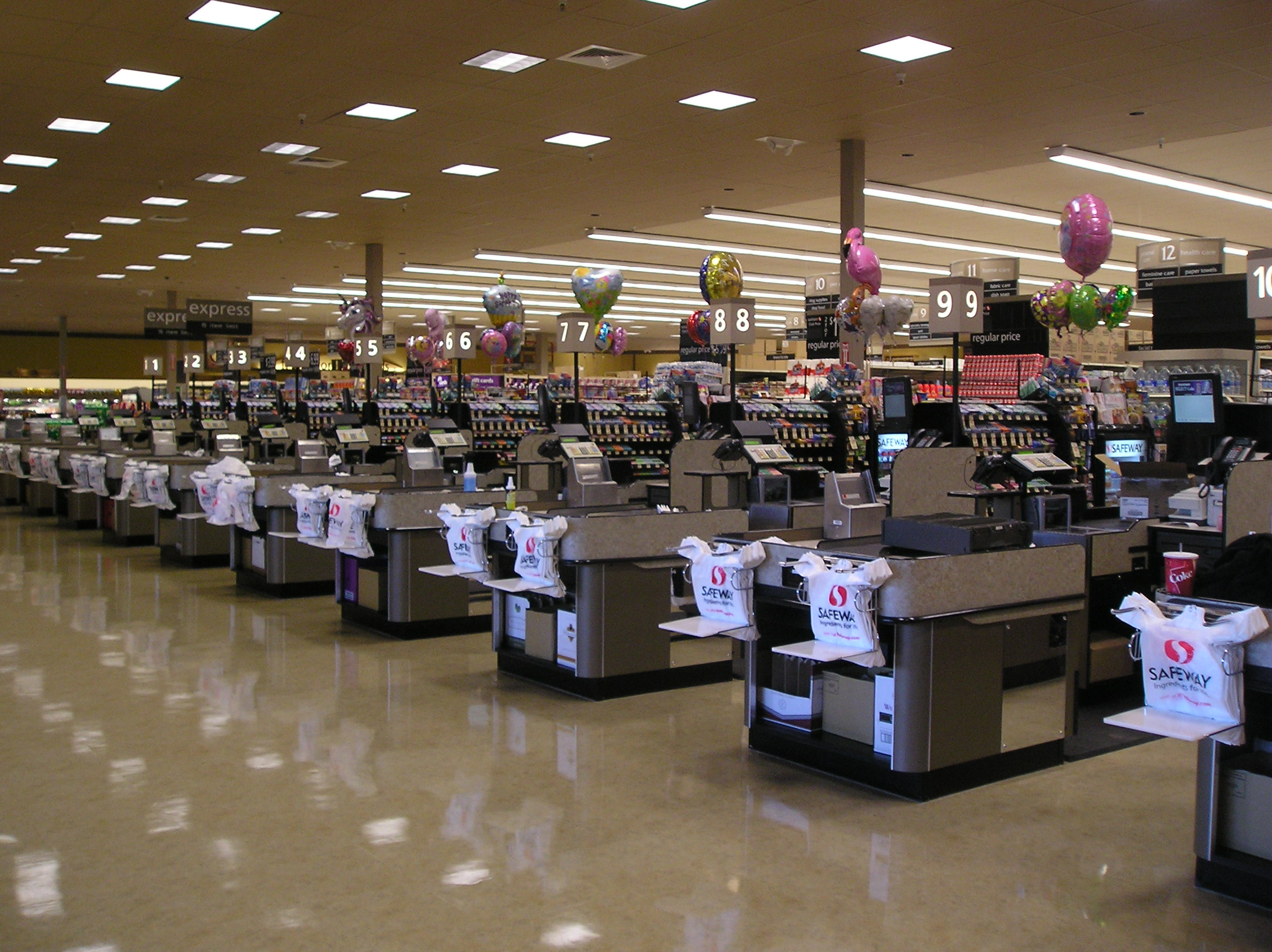
Safeway "Lifestyle" look front end checkouts

By the early 2000s, Safeway's expansion beyond the West Coast had been poorly received, citing Safeway's brands and West Coast-based buyers, with Dominick's on the sale block, and Randalls and Genuardi's losing market share.

To reinvigorate the flagging divisions, increase brand involvement, and to differentiate itself from its competitor, Safeway began a $100 million brand repositioning campaign labeled "Ingredients for life" in 2005.

The launch included a redesigned logo, a new slogan "Ingredients for life" alongside a four-panel life icon to be used throughout stores and advertising, and a web application called "FoodFlex" to improve consumer nutrition. Many locations are being converted to the "Lifestyle" format. The new look was designed by Michigan-based PPC Design. In addition to the "inviting decor with warm ambiance and subdued lighting", the move required heavy redesign of store layout, new employee uniforms, sushi and olive bars, and the addition of in-store Starbucks kiosks (with cupholders on grocery carts). The change also involved differentiating the company from competitors with promotions based on the company's extensive loyalty card database. This would be the design going forward for new and remodeled stores.

At the end of 2004, there were 142 "Lifestyle" format stores in the United States and Canada, with plans to open or remodel another 300 stores with this type of theme the following year. "Lifestyle" format stores have seen significantly higher average weekly sales than its other stores. By the end of 2006, shares were up, proving this rebranding campaign had a major impact on sale figures.

In July 2007, the company stock rose on speculation that Sears Holdings Corporation was seeking to purchase Safeway.

In 2011, Safeway signed an agreement with UNFI, for the distribution to all of Safeway's banners in the United States for non-proprietary natural, organic and specialty products effective October 2011.

=== Decline and sale to Albertsons ===
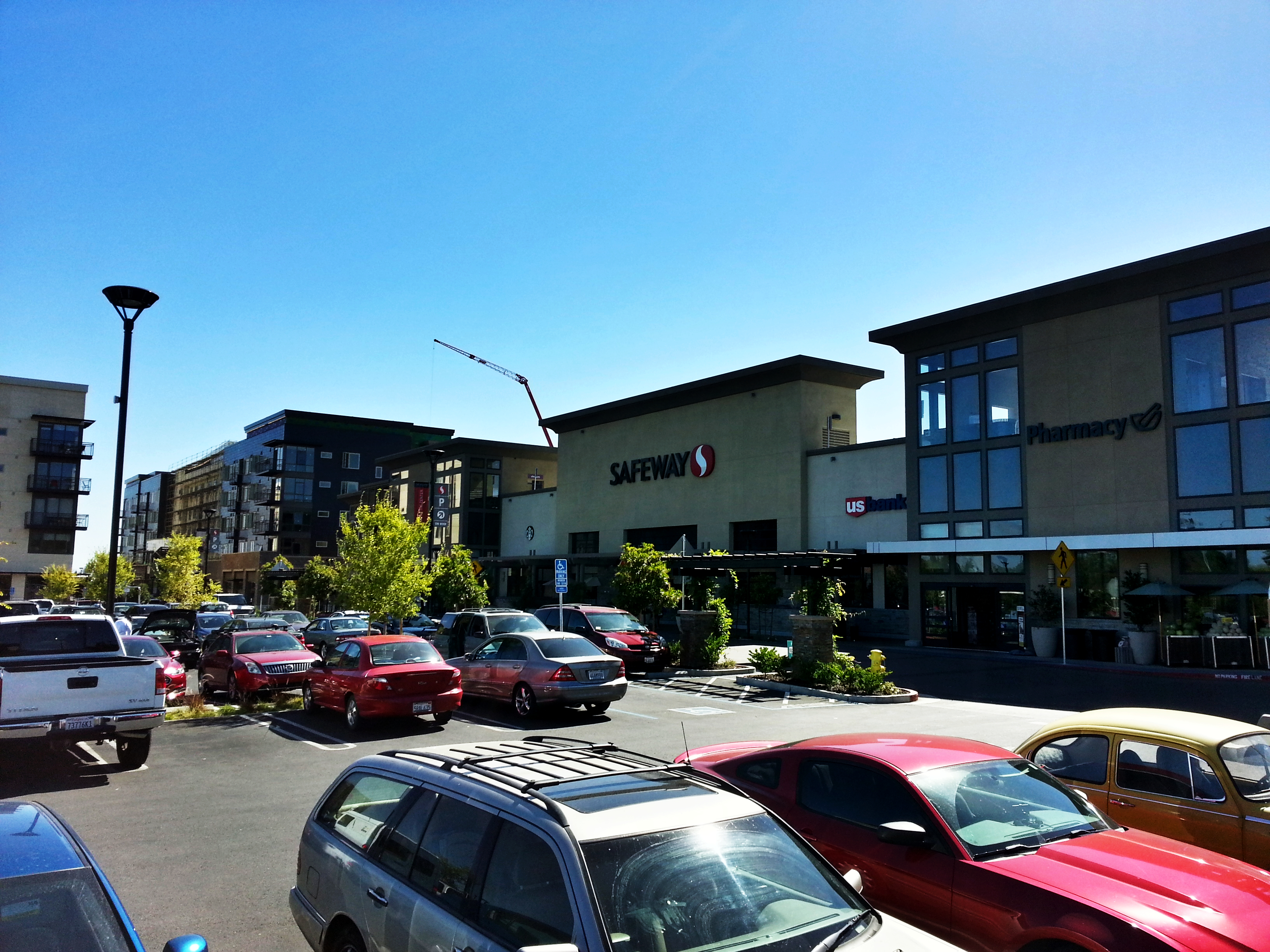
The largest Safeway built from the ground up in the United States is part of a mixed-use development in Mountain View, California.

The Genuardi's stores in Wilmington, Delaware, were converted to the Safeway name in 2004 due to legal issues stemming from a union contract signed by the management of early Safeway stores in Delaware that closed in 1982. The current Safeway locations in Delaware are served by division offices in the Baltimore–Washington metropolitan area, where Safeway has long been a major grocer.

In 2012, the company dissolved the Genuardi's chain in the Philadelphia metro through a combination of store selloffs and closures. Giant acquired 15 of the chain's stores and made an offer for a 16th which was instead sold to a local chain, McCaffrey's, as part of an antitrust settlement. Weis also bought three Genuardi's locations. A number of unprofitable Genuardi's units also had closed in 2010 and 2011 as their leases expired.

Also in 2012, Safeway's then-current CEO, Steve Burd, agreed to build Theranos blood-testing locations at 800 locations, at the cost of $350 million. The vision was to have blood test results done by checkout. Ultimately, the deal failed, and the company and CEO Burd suffered heavy financial losses as a result. In the years following the project termination, all of the spaces designed for Theranos' labs were either converted into Quest Diagnostics drug testing clinics or pharmacy waiting rooms for vaccine customers, or the stores in whole were permanently closed.

In 2013, it was announced that Cerberus Capital Management were exploring a deal for all or part of Safeway. On June 12, 2013, Sobeys announced it would acquire Safeway's operations in Canada for CAD$5.8 billion, subject to regulatory approval. The move will bolster its presence in Western Canada, where Safeway was predominant. Sobeys completed the sale five months later while keeping the Safeway banner on its newly acquired stores while changing private labels to be more inline with those used by its new parent.

In October 2013, Safeway announced that it would close and sell its remaining Dominick's stores in the Chicago area by early 2014. The announcement spurred its competitors to seek employees and desirable store locations they could purchase. One location would remain open in Bannockburn, Illinois, until January 25, 2014.

On February 19, 2014, Safeway began to explore selling itself. On March 6, 2014, longtime rival Albertsons, backed by Cerberus Capital Management announced it would purchase Safeway for $9.4 billion in a deal expected to close in the 4th quarter of the year. Many of Safeway's private brands and IT systems were integrated and replaced Albertsons legacy equipment. As part of the purchase, Blackhawk Network was spun off into an independent company. Blackhawk remained Safeway's sole gift card provider until 2021, when Albertsons switched to InComm for branded gift cards and network activation. Blackhawk continued to provide Safeway with store gift cards and store credit until January 5, 2023, at which point the remaining Blackhawk cards were taken offline (though cards activated prior to this point will not expire until 2037).

=== Safeway as a supermarket brand ===
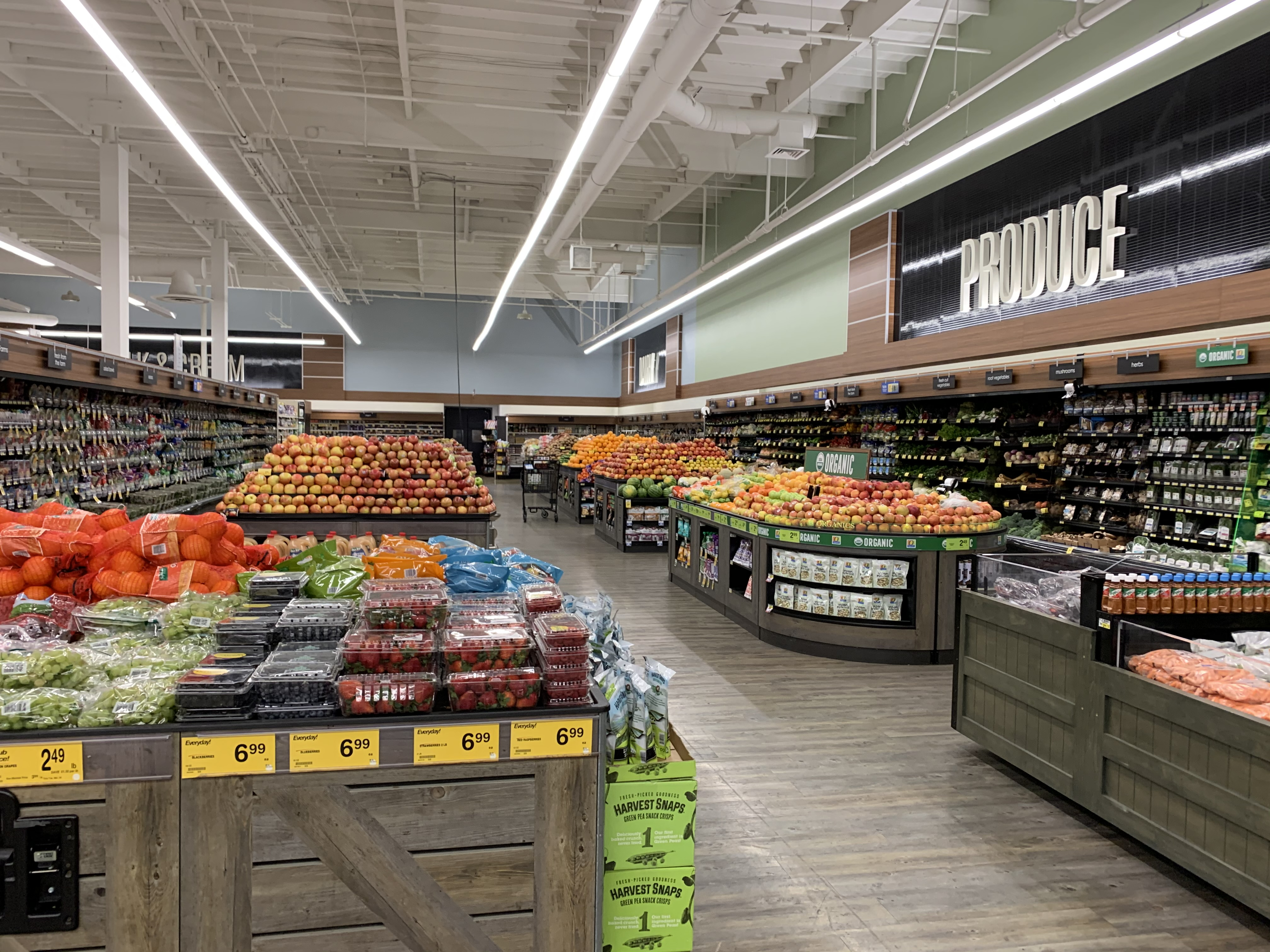
View of the "Lifestyle 2.0" theme as seen from the produce department of the Foster City location. Safeway began rolling out this theme in 2018.

On January 30, 2015, the merger between Safeway and Albertsons was finalized. As part of the merger, Bellingham, Washington-headquartered grocery chain Haggen announced it would buy 146 Vons, Albertsons, and Pavilions stores across Washington, Oregon, California, Nevada, and Arizona as part of anti-monopoly requirements following the merger. Some of the major metropolitan areas affected were Los Angeles, Portland, Phoenix, Tucson, San Diego, Bakersfield, Seattle, and Las Vegas. Other stores in the West Coast, along with the Dallas-Fort Worth Metroplex market, also saw divestments.

Following the purchase, Safeway and its remaining brands, Randalls, Tom Thumb, Vons, and Pavilions, along with their respective divisions, were integrated into the operations of Albertsons, and Safeway's proprietary food products were distributed in all of the Albertsons-Safeway banners, replacing Albertsons' SuperValu branded products. All former Albertsons banners had their telephones and NCR POS systems replaced with Safeway's Toshiba/IBM hardware.

On January 11, 2016, it was announced that the three remaining Albertsons stores in Florida, located in Largo, Altamonte Springs and Oakland Park, would be re-bannered as Safeway; this marks the first time that the Safeway brand would exist on a supermarket operation in Florida. These stores were short lived, as Albertsons later abandoned their Florida operations and sold the stores to Publix in 2018.

In November 2016, Safeway Inc. agreed to buy Andronico's remaining stores, which were based primarily in the San Francisco Bay Area. When Andronico's closed as an independent company, it had a total of nine locations: three in Berkeley (Solano Avenue, Telegraph Avenue, and Shattuck Avenue); one in the Rancho Shopping Center in Los Altos; one on Irving Street San Francisco; one at the Stanford Shopping Center in Palo Alto; one in Walnut Creek; one in Danville; and one in town of San Anselmo in Marin County. The stores began closing in January 2017, with the North Berkeley, California store closing first. In February 2019, Safeway said that it was considering bringing back the Andronico's name. By February 2020, six Safeway stores were operating under the Andronico's Community Market label, with a seventh planned. Four Andronico’s stores in the Bay Area were renamed Safeway Community Market after the 2016 acquisition, though the flagship store in the Sunset District kept the Andronico’s name. Another store in Monterey opened in January 2019 as Andronico’s. In February 2020, four locations of Safeway Community Markets returned to the Andronico’s name - two in Berkeley, one in Los Altos, and one in San Anselmo. Today the stores operate as a special District within the Northern California division, which allows the management team to operate the stores more similarly to how Andronico's ran when it was an independent company.

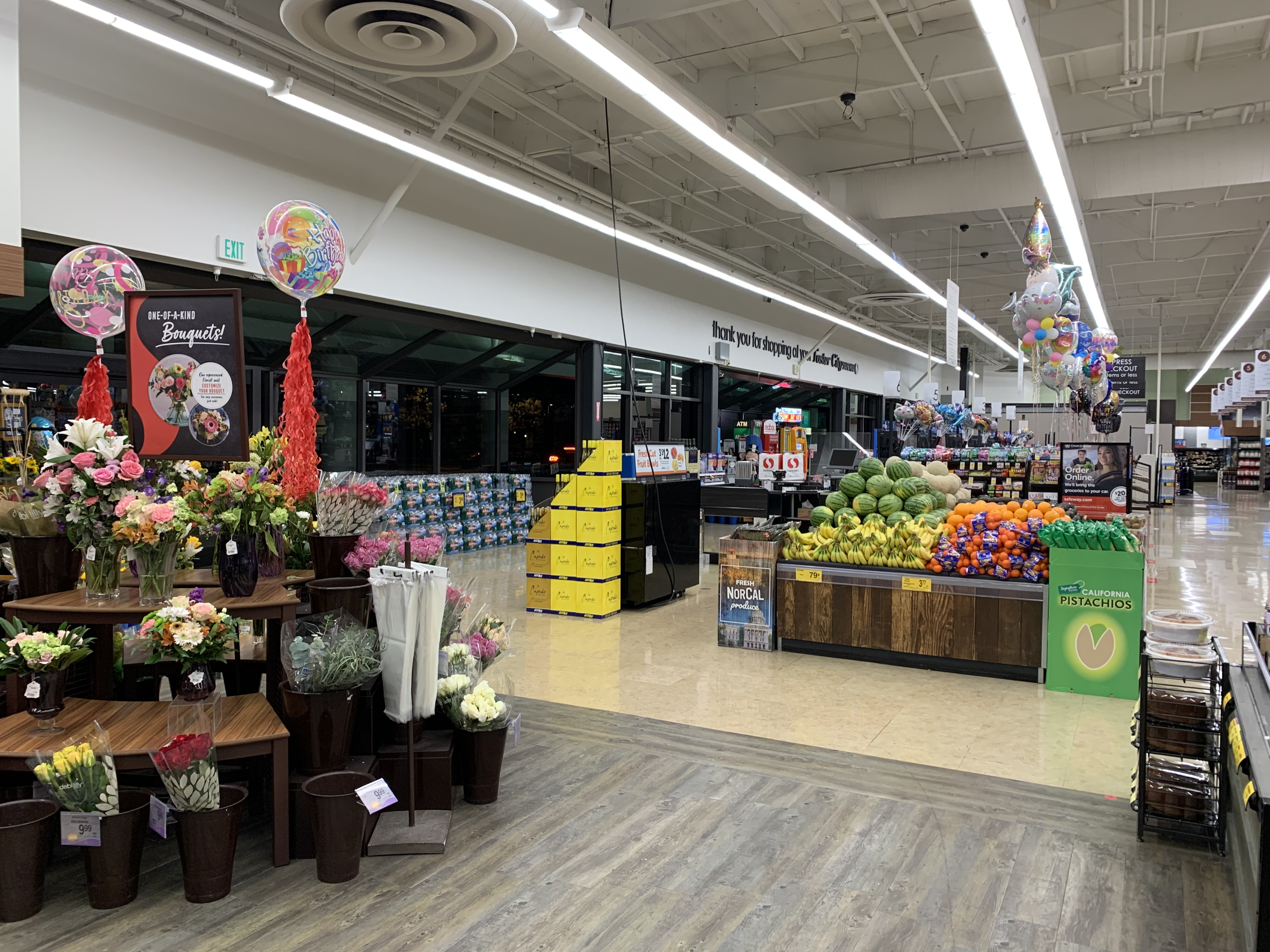

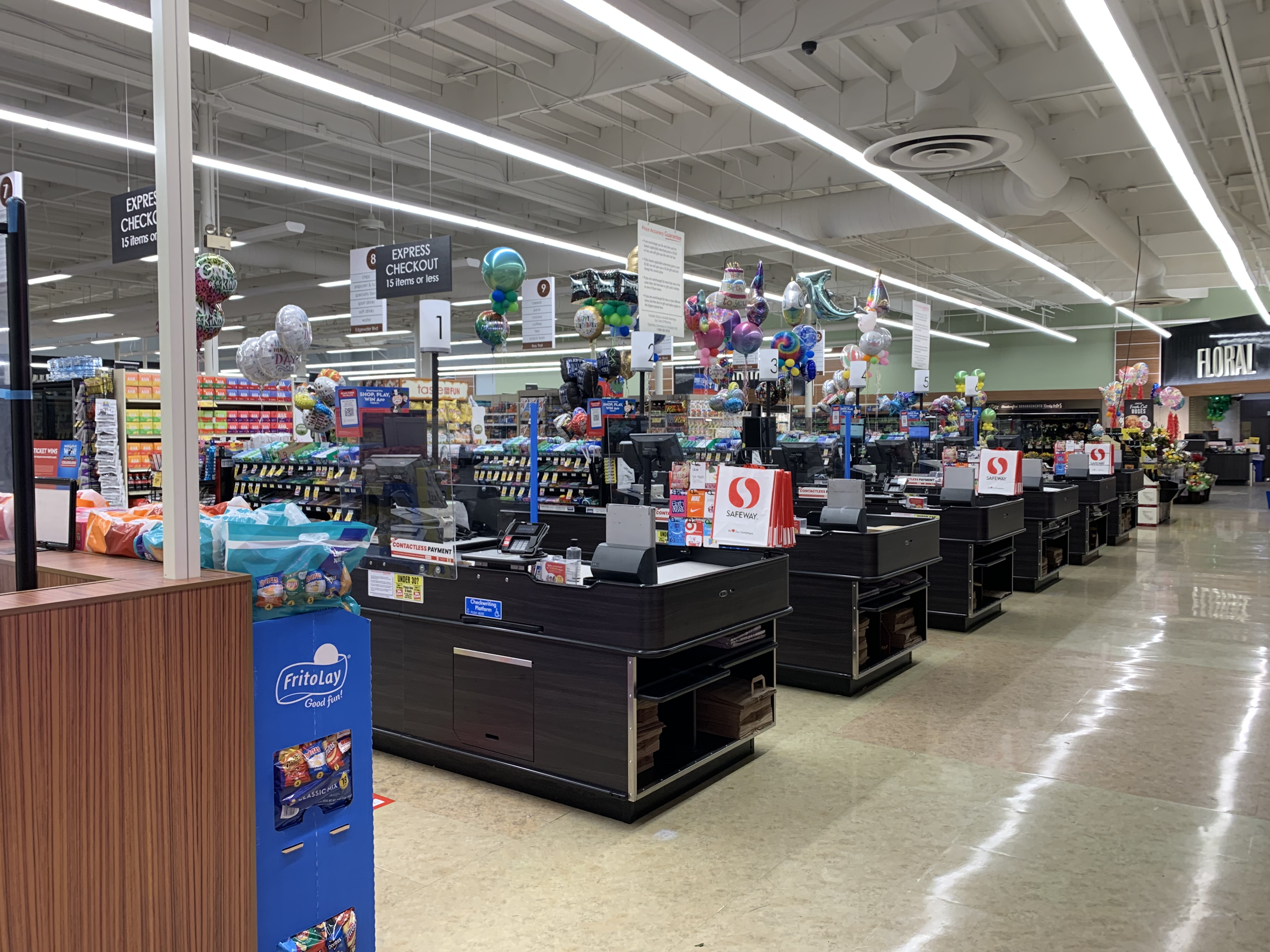
Front lobby/register area in an updated store

Beginning in 2018, Safeway and Albertsons began remodeling stores with a new theme that moved away from the "Lifestyle" decor first introduced in the early 2000s. The new theme features brighter colors and tiled backsplashes on department signage. The company has also begun to replace most of its lighting setup in favor of LEDs. Most older stores used fluorescent tubes in the main aisles with halogen spotlights in the departments or to accent display cases for a relaxed ambiance. The new standard is LED retrofit tubes for the old fluorescent fixtures, and completely replacing the halogen spot lamps with LED strips or office-style ceiling fixtures that focus on overall illumination instead of targeted, accented lighting. They also replaced lighting in employee areas and offices throughout 2021.

In 2019, Safeway was ordered by a judge to pay a fine of $12 million after a Santa Clara County, California, cashier was denied the right to sit. California state law guarantees the right of workers to have "suitable seats".

In August 2021, Safeway launched FreshPass, a paid subscription service that allows for free unlimited delivery/pickup and gives members exclusive discounts and offers. The program was launched with a refreshed mobile app that supports scan-and-pay shopping in select markets. Safeway also activated QR payments and digital receipts with the updated mobile app. The "Just for U" rewards program (commonly branded J4U), first launched in 2012, was simplified to "for u" as part of the FreshPass launch.

Other Albertsons stores in various markets have rebranded as Safeway, including Denver and Seattle.

In October 2022, Albertsons and its competitor, Kroger, which also operates King Soopers and City Market stores, announced a merger agreement. Following initial opposition, the two parent companies said they would sell 400+ stores to a competitor, C&S Wholesale Grocers. Regardless, the planned merger has been challenged in court by a couple of states. In February 2024, Colorado Attorney General Phil Weiser filed a lawsuit; he summarized consumer and worker opposition: the merger "would lead to stores closing, higher prices, fewer jobs, worse customer service, and less resilient supply chains.”

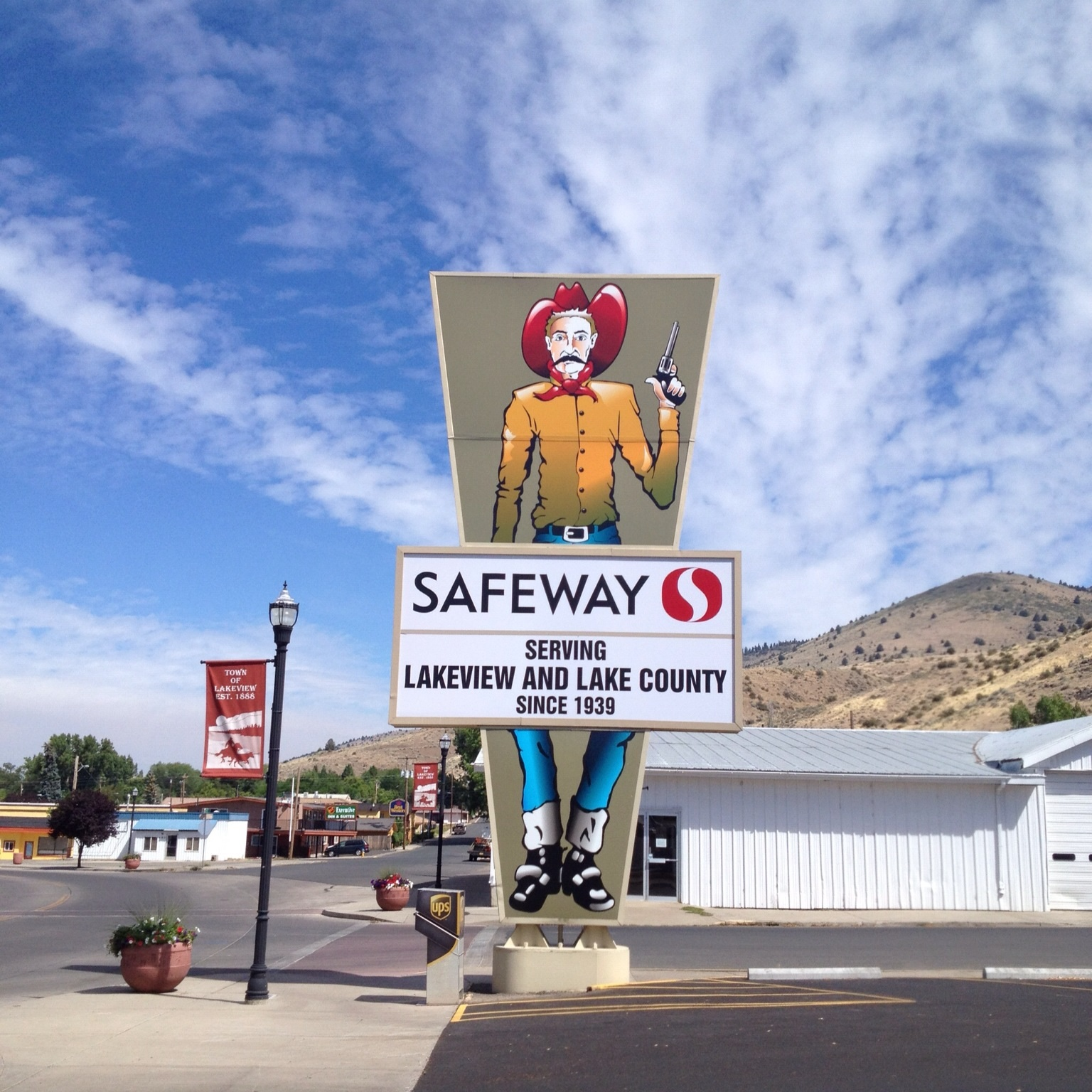
Safeway store sign in Lakeview, Oregon

== Private brands ==
In 2006, Safeway introduced an organically grown and processed line of products named "O Organics". The brand has proved successful, with yearly sales surpassing $1 billion in 2017. Open Nature was launched in 2011, and has also proved successful enough that Open Nature has absorbed some other previous private brands (Such as Bright Green, Signature Home, and Lucerne Plant-Based products).

After its acquisition by Albertsons, the combined company adopted Safeway's private label brand program, changed the name from "Safeway Select" to "Signature Select", and updated the branding and packaging for all of their products.

== Grocery delivery ==
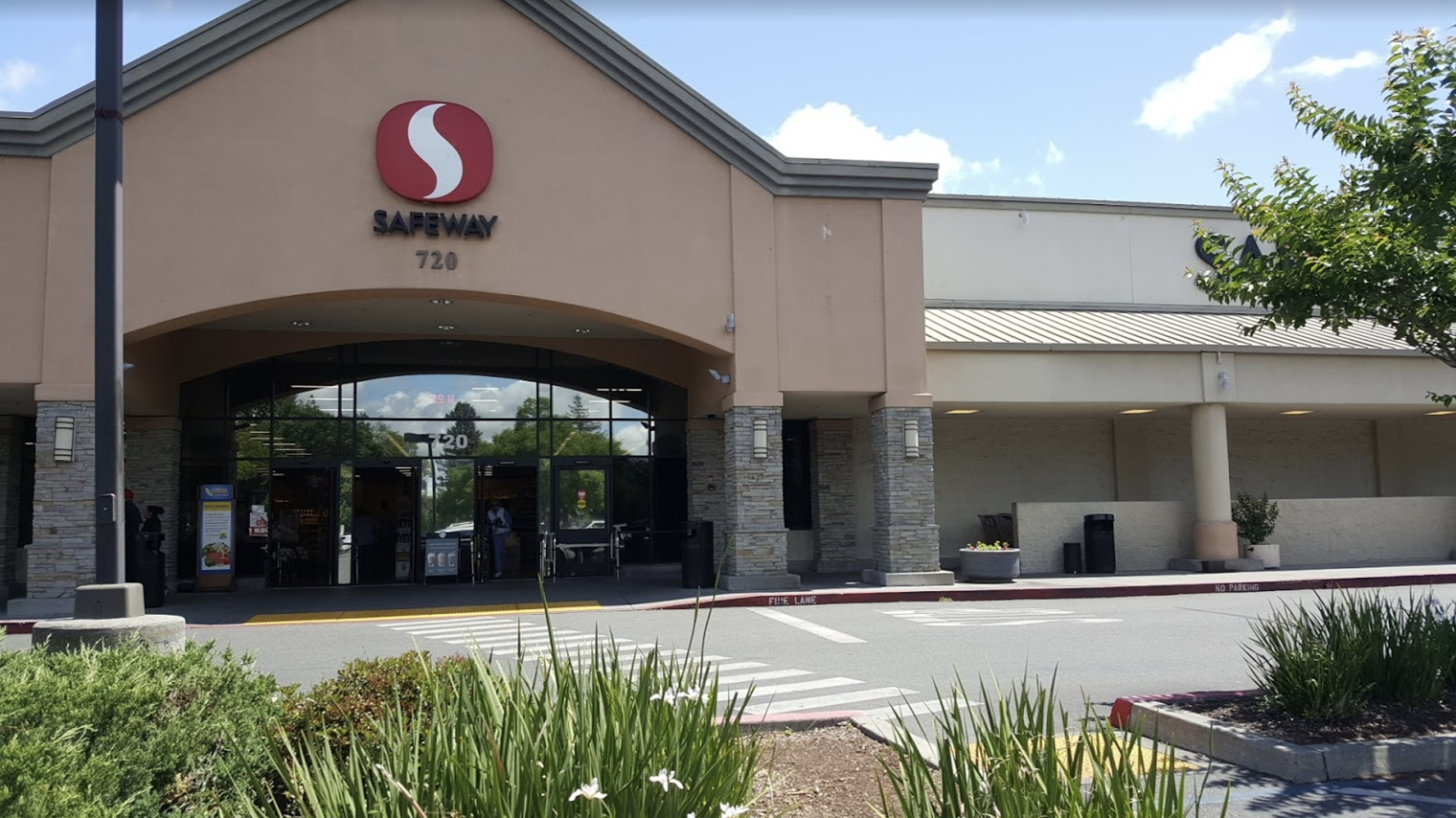
An early-21st-century Safeway store in Chico, California

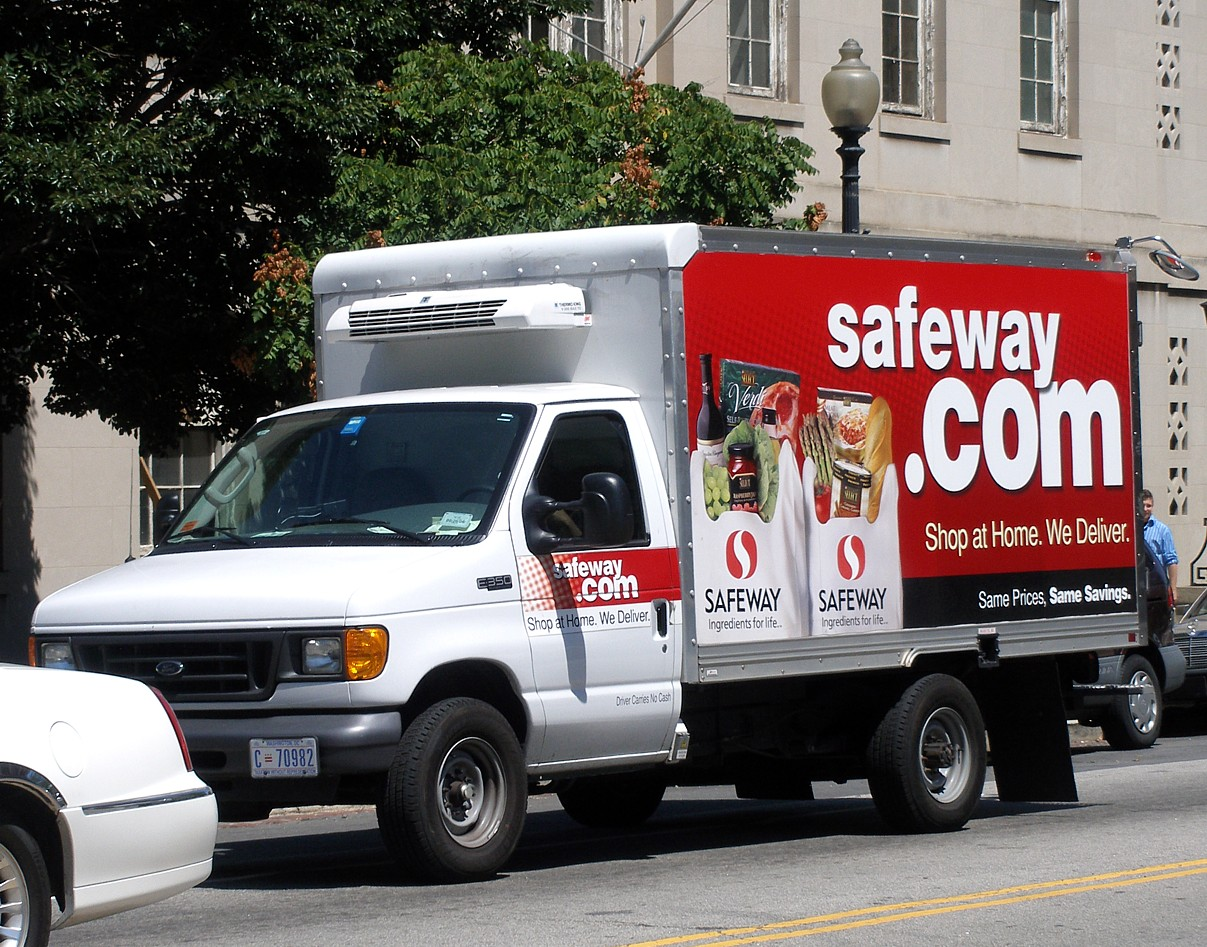
A Safeway.com delivery truck, used for deliveries to people who buy their groceries online

Safeway has offered online grocery delivery service in select markets starting in the American Northwest region in 2000. The service grew to deliver in six states and the District of Columbia, mostly along the west and east coast. Safeway has rapidly expanded the number of locations offering contactless curbside pickup (marketed as "DriveUp & Go"), and continues to offer traditional prescheduled delivery services along with on-demand deliveries filled via Instacart and DoorDash.

In January 2021, Albertsons announced that it would be laying off union company-employed grocery delivery drivers at Safeway stores in the Northern California region, stating that they would be transferring those services to app-based delivery platforms, such as Instacart. This decision only affected employees working in the 'traditional' scheduled delivery department inside the stores, and all employees were offered other positions within the company.

== Past concepts ==
Safeway throughout the decades has ventured and experimented with different concepts and themes for its locations and stores.

In 1963, Safeway developed the Super S format – which combined a general merchandise and drug store and a new Safeway supermarket in the same building. The stores shared a common entrance, but operated as separate businesses with their own checkstands. The first outlet opened in Anchorage, Alaska. In 1965, 22 existing Super S stores were sold to Skaggs Drug Stores. Safeway sold the remaining stores in 1971.

In 1964, Safeway opened a trial two-level International Store at 12th and F Street in Washington, D.C., with a conventional Safeway downstairs and a gourmet store on the upper floor. The Safeway International Store range included wild boar steaks, snow hare, suckling pig, and reindeer steaks.

The company also made a number of attempts to repurpose older, smaller store sites, opening Food Barn, a discount grocery outlet, and Liquor Barn, a discount liquor outlet, in the 1970s. Safeway also trialed Town House in Washington, D.C., small stores targeting apartment dwellers, and a gourmet store concept, Bon Appetit in San Francisco and Tiburon, California.

In 1969, Safeway formed a joint venture with Holly Farms Poultry Industries (now part of Tyson Foods) to open Holly Farms Fried Chicken in an effort to diversify into fast food restaurants and compete with KFC. The first store opened in Colonial Heights, Virginia in August 1969.

Safeway also acquired Pak 'n Save Foods, a box warehouse concept, as part of the 1983 purchase of Brentwood in Northern California. While these stores were initially distinct in price points and bulk sales, today they are functionally and operationally the same as regular Safeway supermarkets. By 2023, there were two Pak 'n Save locations remaining in San Leandro and Emeryville; all of the other locations had been either permanently closed or remodeled into standard Safeway locations.

== Logos ==
Safeway Medallion logo, 1946

The Ribbon Leaf logo, 1982

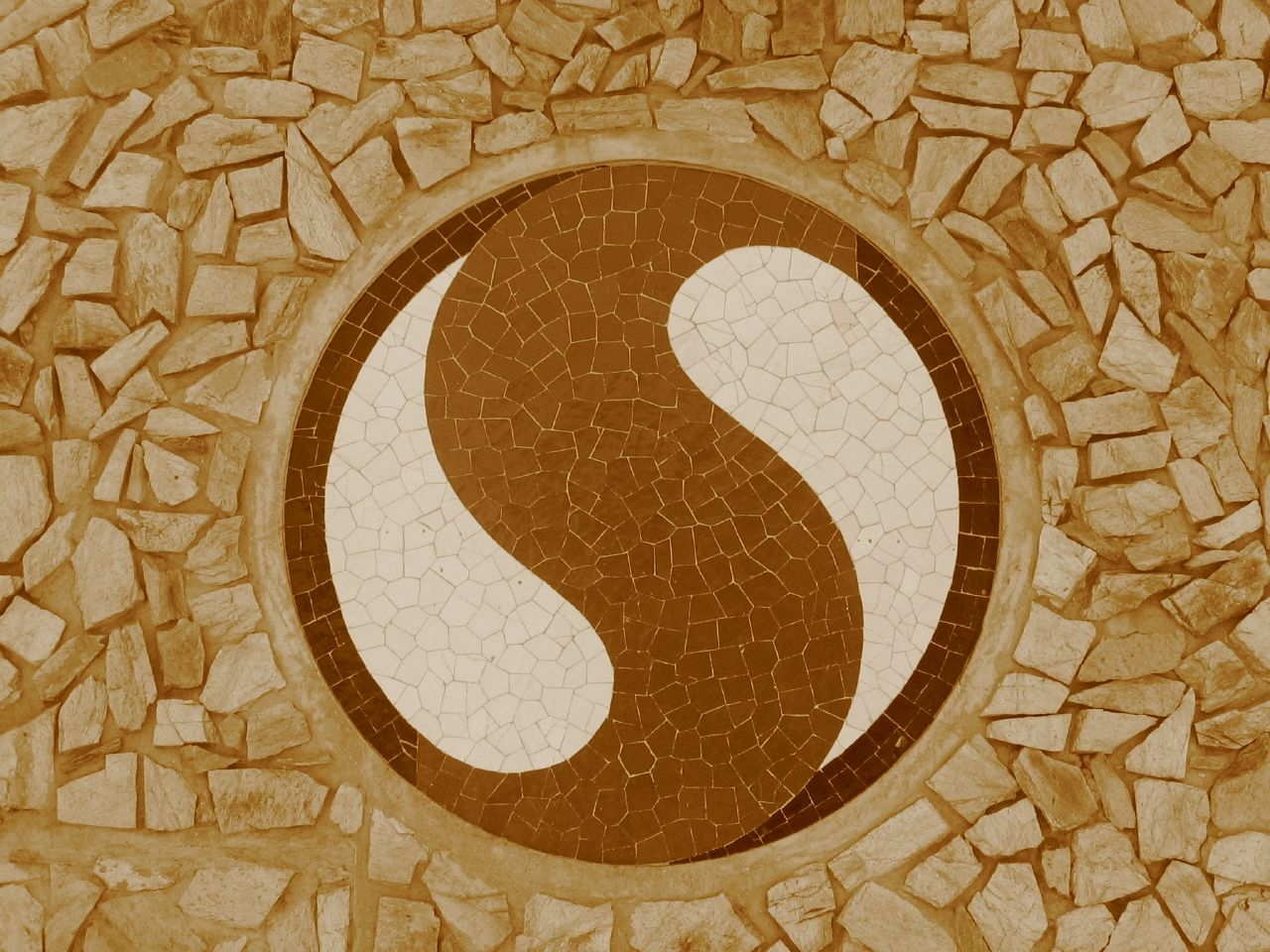
The Medallion logo in tile, July 2005

Current logo, 2006

== Safeway corporate information ==
=== Support offices ===
- California
  - Pleasanton, California (Headquarters), Corporate Call Center, IT Support Services, Retail Pricing
- Colorado
  - Denver, Colorado (Offices, Safeway Security, Trucking)
- Arizona
  - Phoenix, Arizona (Offices, Accounting Offices, IT)
- Maryland
  - Lanham, Maryland (Eastern US Headquarters)

=== Store music and intercom announcements ===
Safeway music is provided by Stingray Advertising. The network beams commercials and advertisements for Safeway products and services that play intermittently with the music. The store's unique "Attention Service Desk" announcements, which are used to communicate phone calls on hold to employees, are generated by Cisco's Call Manager Server as an overhead announcement.

=== Animal welfare concerns ===
In 2012, Mercy for Animals conducted an undercover investigation at Christensen Farms, a pork supplier to Safeway, Walmart, Costco, Kroger, and Kmart. Before the public release of Mercy for Animals' investigation at Christensen Farms, Safeway announced it would begin requiring pork suppliers to phase out gestation crates.

In 2008, Greenpeace started ranking America's major supermarket chains on their seafood sustainability practices because, according to Phil Radford, Greenpeace U.S. CEO, "three quarters of global fish stocks are suffering from overfishing, and 90% of top marine predators are already gone". Criteria included the number of threatened fish species supermarkets sold, their seafood purchasing policies, and ocean legislation policies it supported. Greenpeace annual Carting Away the Oceans (CATO) report ranks supermarkets on a scale of 1 to 10, with 1 being least sustainable with seafood policies and 10 being the most sustainable with seafood policies. Safeway ranked second best (7.1 out of 10) on the 2013 CATO Report by ensuring that its store brand of canned tuna was sustainably fished and by lobbying for science-based ocean conservation policies.

In 2016, Safeway parent company Albertsons joined a growing wave of companies moving toward "cage-free" egg production and announced a planned shift to cage-free eggs by 2025 following campaigns by The Humane League, Mercy for Animals, The Humane Society of the United States, and others. Following the passage of California Proposition 12, Lucerne and O Organics switched to full cage-free egg production at their facilities in California in January 2022.

=== 401(k) plan mismanagement lawsuit ===
In July 2021, Safeway Inc. and its co-defendants reached an $8.5 million settlement in a class action lawsuit alleging mismanagement of the company’s 401(k) retirement plan. The lawsuit, Terraza v. Safeway Inc. et al., was filed in 2016 in the United States District Court for the Northern District of California. It accused Safeway, the Safeway Benefit Plans Committee, and investment advisor Aon Hewitt Investment Consulting, Inc. of breaching fiduciary duties under the Employee Retirement Income Security Act (ERISA), resulting in financial harm to over 30,000 plan participants.

== See also ==
- List of supermarket chains in the United States
- Safeway (Australia)—Sold to Woolworths Group in 1985. All locations renamed to Woolworths from 2008 to 2017.
- Safeway (Canada)—Sold to Sobeys in 2013. Continues to use the Safeway banner.
- Safeway (UK)—Sold to Argyll Foods in 1987. Continued to use the Safeway name until 2005, after they were acquired by Morrisons in 2004.
