= Simon David =

Gourmet food store in Dallas, Texas, US

- Type: Grocer, Division of Tom Thumb
- Industry: Retail
- Founded: 1889
- Defunct: May 26, 2010 (16 years ago)
- Headquarters: Dallas, Texas
- Parent: Randalls (1992-1999); Safeway Inc. (1999-2010)

Simon David was a gourmet and specialty grocery store founded in 1889 in Dallas, Texas that grew into a regional chain after being acquired by Tom Thumb Supermarkets in 1963. Tom Thumb would be acquired by Randalls in 1992 and by Safeway Inc. in 1999, with the Simon David brand gradually phased out and the final location converted to a Tom Thumb in 2010.

== History ==
Named for its founder, Simon David opened in 1889 as the first food retailer and deliverer in Dallas to specialize in out-of-season items and imported merchandise. Originally a small brick structure adjacent to Mr. David's home in Uptown Dallas' historic State Thomas neighborhood, the business expanded to 4311 Oak Lawn Avenue in the 1920s and thrived under the supervision of second-generation owner Delmer David, who opened an additional wholesale outlet along with separate packing and shipping facilities that distributed Simon David products nationwide. The third location opened October 19, 1961, on Inwood Road, where the founder's grandson, Stanley M. David became the first grocer in Dallas to offer a liquor department before selling the franchise to Tom Thumb in 1963. A larger building replaced the original Inwood Road location in 1985 at the same address. While Tom Thumb would later market a statewide chain of Simon David stores, only the Inwood Road location retained the name of its founder.

=== Randall's Food Markets ===
Tom Thumb and its Simon David division were acquired by the Randall's Food Markets chain of Houston in 1992. Randall's retained the Tom Thumb and Simon David names in the Dallas/Fort Worth market, but would convert the seven Tom Thumb stores in Austin, Texas, to Randall's in January 1994, when it also converted nine newly acquired AppleTree Markets. The Simon David in the Arboretum Market (opened in 1987) was not converted, but it would close in December 1996 and would be converted into a Saks Fifth Avenue, until the space's subsequent development into a Trader Joe's in 2014. Though after many customers lamented the loss of the city's only Simon David, Randall's decided in 1998 to make its Bee Caves store a Flagship Randall's supermarket, the first in the city and the eighth in the chain.

=== Safeway ===
In 1999 Randall's and its Tom Thumb/Simon David divisions were acquired by Safeway. Safeway retained the Randall's name in Houston and Austin and the Tom Thumb and Simon David names in Dallas/Fort Worth. Safeway announced plans in May 2010 that the Inwood Road location, the last to use the Simon David banner, will be replaced with a Tom Thumb, pending permit approvals.
