= Daniel Reeves Stores =

American grocery store chain

Daniel Reeves Stores was a grocery store chain which numbered 297 units in the New York City area in 1922. The business was founded by the father and uncle of Dan Reeves. The founders worked their way up from fruit peddlers.

== Merger ==
Daniel Reeves Stores merged with Safeway, Inc, in 1941. The merger was announced by James Reeves, president of Daniel Reeves Stores, Inc., and included its eastern chain of 408 grocery stores.
