= Robert Randall Onstead =

American businessman

Robert Randall Onstead, Senior (July 20, 1931 – August 4, 2004) was founder of Randall's Food Markets in Houston and served as chair of the board from 1966 to 1999.

== Biography ==
Onstead was born in Garrett, Texas. Onstead first gained experience in the grocery business when he delivered groceries for his uncle in Ennis, Texas. He graduated from Ennis High School in Ennis, Texas in 1948 and the University of North Texas in 1954. Onstead also served for two years in the United States Air Force. He had been president of Onstead Interests since 1999 and a limited partner in the Houston Texans since 2001. He was inducted into the Texas Business Hall of Fame in 1993.

Onstead died in Sicily during a vacation. He had a heart attack at the airport while traveling with his wife, daughter, and granddaughter. He was 73 years old when he died.
