= Randalls =

American supermarket chain in Texas owned by Albertsons Companies, Inc

Randalls Food & Drug L.P.

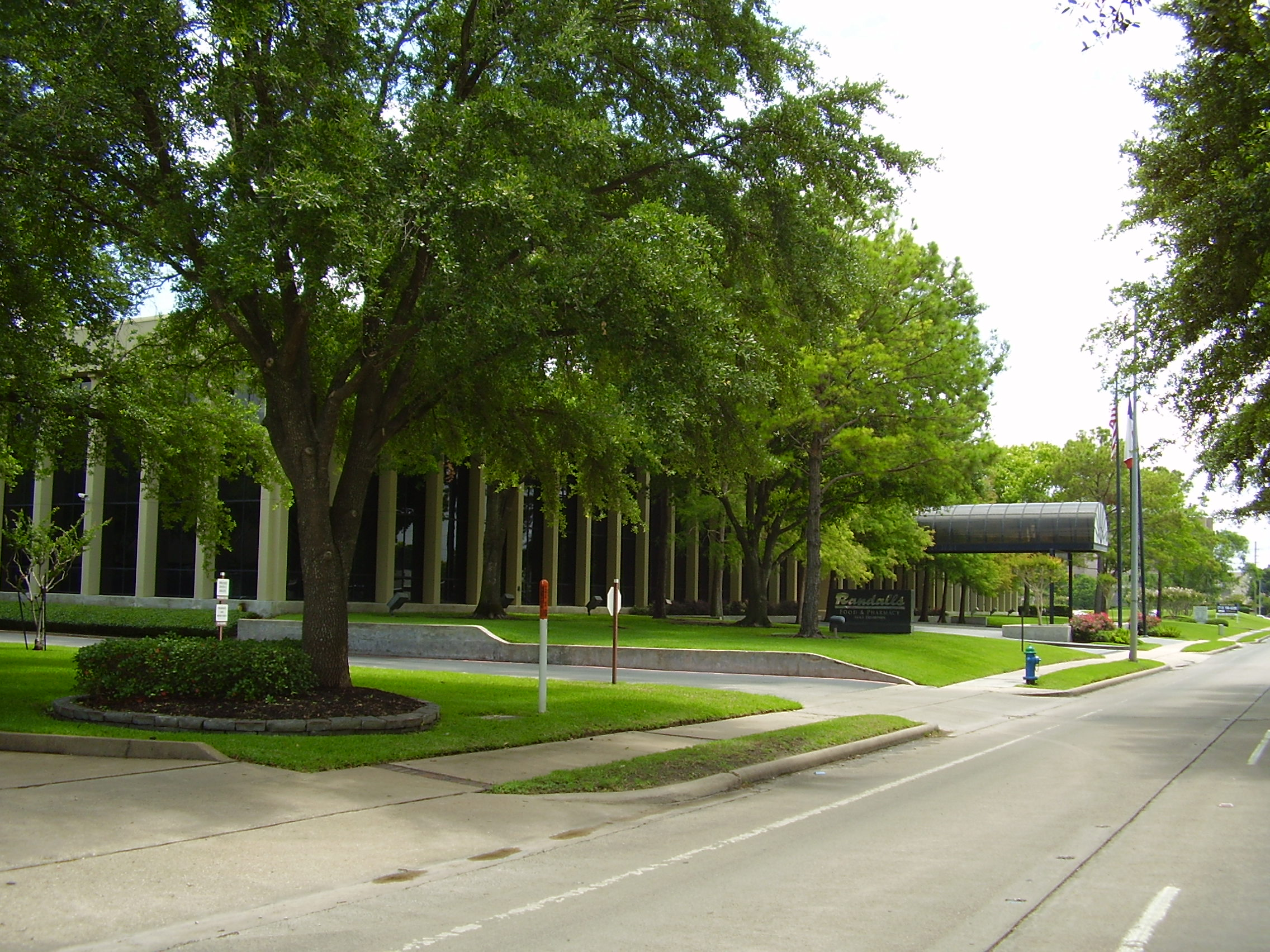
- Former Randalls headquarters in Westchase, Houston
- Trade name: Randalls
- Formerly: Randalls Food Markets (until 1999 sale to Safeway)
- Type: Subsidiary
- Industry: Retail / Grocery
- Founded: July 4, 1966 (60 years ago) in Houston, Texas, U.S.
- Founders: Robert Randall Onstead; R. C. Barclay; Norman N. Frewin
- Headquarters: Westchase, Houston, Texas, U.S.
- Number of locations: 25 (April 18, 2026)
- Key people: Paul McTavish (Division President); Leslie Neslson (Vice President of Finance); Ronnie Brennan (Vice President of Finance)
- Products: Bakery, dairy, delicatessen, frozen foods, grocery, meat, pharmacy, produce, seafood, snacks, liquor
- Services: Supermarket
- Revenue: ▲US$112 million (2020)
- Number of employees: 16,000 (December 2021)
- Parent: Independent (1966–1999); Safeway (1999–2015); Albertsons (2015–present)
- Website: www.randalls.com

Randalls Food & Drug L.P. is an American supermarket chain which operates 25 supermarkets in Texas under the Randalls and Flagship Randalls banners. The chain consists of 13 stores located around the Houston area and 12 stores located around the Austin area as of August 2026. Randalls today forms the nucleus of the current Houston division of Albertsons and is headquartered in the Westchase district of Houston. The office served as the headquarters of the independent Randalls company before its takeover and later the Texas division of Safeway. The Randalls distribution center was near Cypress, Texas (the Cy-Fair area in unincorporated Northwest Harris County with a Houston postal address), and now is serviced by the Tom Thumb distribution in Roanoke, Texas, in the Dallas–Fort Worth metroplex.

Most stores include fresh seafood, floral, cosmetic, bakery and film processing departments. The premium Flagship Randalls and Flagship Tom Thumb stores have increased their take-out departments to provide fresh-made pizzas, pastas and barbecue. Many locations even offer bank branches, ATMs, coffee shops, drive-through pharmacy windows, fueling stations and full-service counters where a customer can purchase lottery or movie tickets, pay utility bills and car license renewals.

== History ==
Randalls Food Markets was founded by Robert Randall Onstead, R. C. Barclay, Norman N. Frewin and T.A. Morgan in Houston, Texas, on July 4, 1966, with the purchase of two existing grocery stores. The first Randalls opened in 1966. The company's fourth store opened in 1970, and by the end of the decade the company owned 15 stores and had established itself in the market. In 1980 Randalls had 8% of the Houston area grocery market, making it the fourth largest grocer there. By 1985 the company was the second largest grocer in the five-county Greater Houston area, with 17% of the sales in the market.

During a visit to the United States in 1989, Soviet politician Boris Yeltsin, who later became the President of Russia, visited a Randalls store in Clear Lake. Yeltsin was amazed by the selection of goods available in the store and was quoted as saying, "Even the Politburo doesn’t have this choice. Not even Mr. Gorbachev." Yeltsin later wrote in his autobiography, "When I saw those shelves crammed with hundreds, thousands of cans, cartons and goods of every possible sort, for the first time I felt quite frankly sick with despair for the Soviet people. ... That such a potentially super-rich country as ours has been brought to a state of such poverty!"

By 1990 the chain had expanded to 42 stores. In 1991 Randalls earned over a billion dollars in revenue, making it the fastest growing company in Houston.

=== Expanding from Houston ===
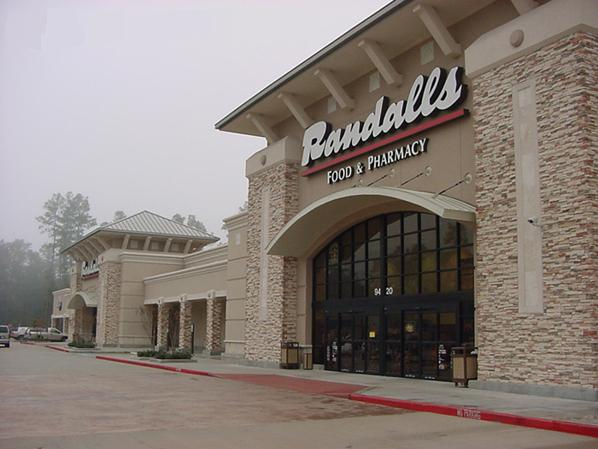
A Randalls Food & Pharmacy store in The Woodlands in Montgomery County, Texas, in October 2006 (Store #2617). This location closed in December 2018.

In the 1990s, Randalls expanded into Dallas, Fort Worth and Austin. Cullum Companies, owner of 62 Tom Thumb and Simon David stores in Dallas, Fort Worth and Austin, became part of the Randalls family in 1992, doubling the company's size with more than 115 stores statewide. The Tom Thumb logo was changed to one similar to Randalls, but the Tom Thumb name was retained. Already in Austin with the Tom Thumb name, Randalls added its own name to the market in January 1994 when the company bought 12 AppleTree Markets stores (ironically a grocer formed with former Safeway locations as a result of Safeway leaving Texas in 1988). Nine of the 12 AppleTree Markets and all seven Tom Thumb stores were converted to the Randalls banner, giving the company a significant presence in the Texas Hill Country. The remaining three AppleTree stores were closed. Though the Simon David would remain open until December 1996, after which it became a Saks Fifth Avenue. After many customers lamented the loss of Austin's only Simon David, Randalls decided in 1998 to make its Bee Caves store a Flagship Randalls supermarket, the first in the city and the eighth in the chain.

After 28 years in operation, Randalls began to sell beer and wine in its stores in late 1994. (Though company-owned Tom Thumb and AppleTree stores in Dallas and Austin acquired beginning in 1992 had already been selling beer and wine.)

== Post-Onstead era ==
=== Kohlberg Kravis Roberts & Co. ===
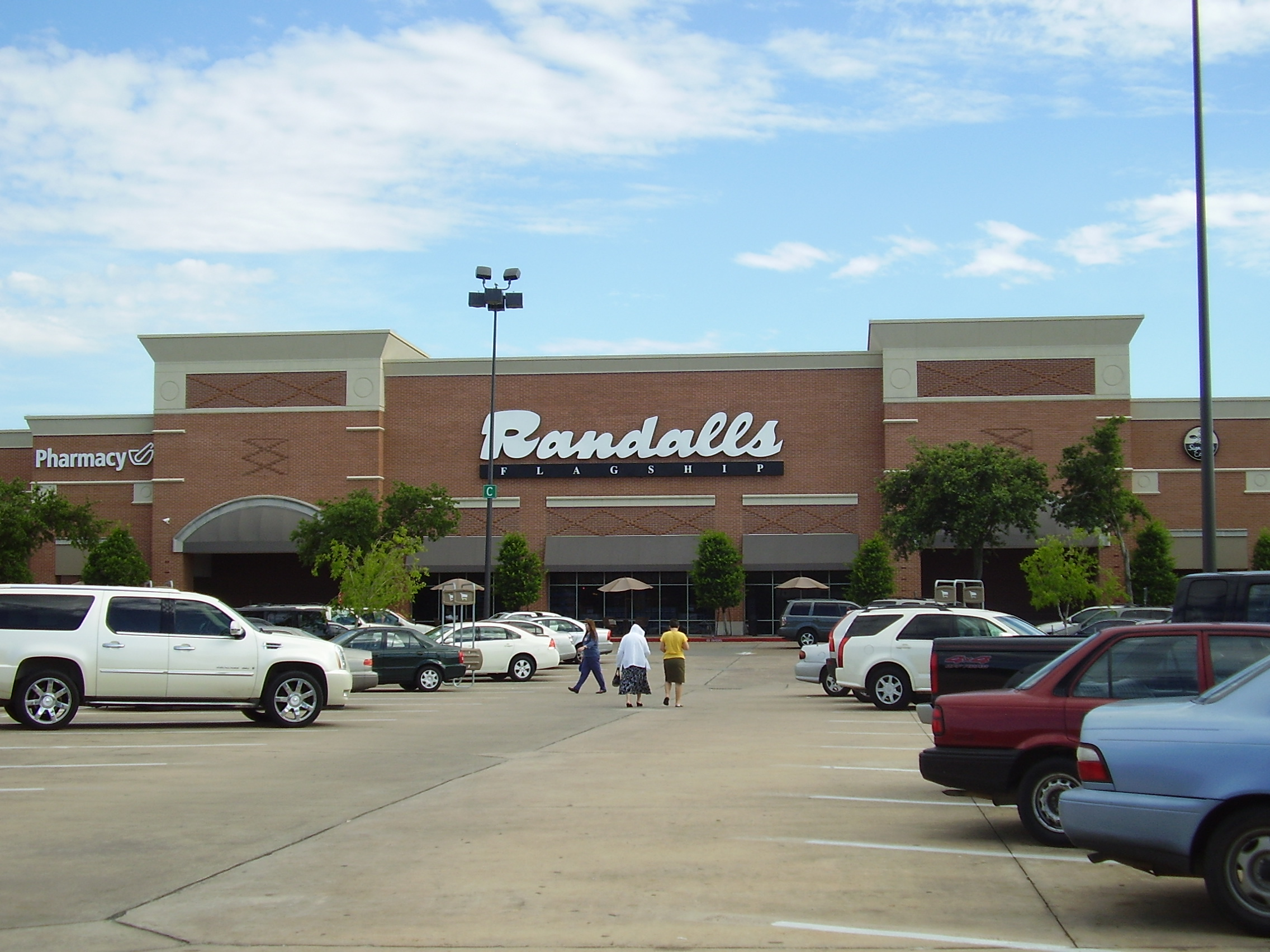
A Flagship Randalls store in Houston in May 2009 (Store #1061)

In April 1997, buyout firm Kohlberg Kravis Roberts & Co. invested $225 million in exchange for a majority interest in the supermarket chain. Randalls then accelerated its growth in various markets and at the same time sold or closed a number of stores that choked advancement. Within a year, the company opened one store in Houston and three stores in Dallas (including two replacement stores), while closing four stores in Houston, two stores in Dallas as Tom Thumb (which were replaced) and four stores in Austin.

On February 28, 1999, Randalls had 45 Houston area stores, generating $1060.2 million in annual sales. It had 20.3% of the Houston area grocery market. It had 7,876 Houston-area employees. Within a year before February 28, 1999, one store was opened and seven were remodeled. In July of that year it had 20.2% of the area market, making it the second largest grocer there.

=== Safeway ===
In 1999, Safeway Inc., a Fortune 50 company and one of the largest food and drug retailers in North America based on sales, bought the then 116-store Randalls/Tom Thumb chain. The purchase was announced on Friday July 23, 1999. Safeway retained the Randalls name in Houston and Austin and the Tom Thumb and Simon David names in Dallas/Fort Worth, but replaced many of the Randalls/Tom Thumb "Remarkable" and President's Choice store brands with Safeway private label items. Randalls Food Markets, Inc., became a division of Safeway and changed its division name to Randalls Food & Drugs. By 2001, Randalls operated 46 stores in the Houston area, 12 stores in Austin and 69 stores in the Dallas/Ft. Worth area (under the Tom Thumb and Simon David banners).

In early 2005, Safeway was rumored to be attempting to sell the then 138-store Texas division. Instead, Safeway announced by the end of the year it would close 15 Randalls stores in the Houston area, one in Austin, and nine Tom Thumb stores in the Dallas–Fort Worth area. Following the closures Randalls/Tom Thumb operated 62 stores in Dallas, 36 in Houston and 14 in Austin. Safeway said the move would revitalize the Texas division and that it planned to remodel stores to fit its nationally implemented "Lifestyle" format and introduce proprietary products. The new Lifestyle format features an expanded selection of perishables and a number of unique offerings, including a large selection of natural and organic foods, full-service meat counters, full-service bakeries and floral design centers, as well as sushi bars and olive bars. As a result of intense competition in Randalls operating markets, the "Lifestyle" format stores are Safeway's response in an attempt to recover lost market share. In Houston, market share fell to 6.9% in 2006. In early 2020, the Randalls store in The Woodlands north of Houston which carried many Safeway branded items liquidated inventory and closed permanently. In 2021 Randall store in Bellaire, Texas closing In early 2022, the last remaining Randalls store in Sugar Land, Texas southwest of Houston, also was liquidated and closed. This store had opened in the early 1980's as First Colony was just starting to be built. Other Sugar Land locations were at 6 & Austin Parkway, and in New Territory, both of which closed in the mid-late 2000's.

=== Albertsons ===
In March 2014, Cerberus Capital Management agreed to terms to purchase Randalls' parent, Safeway, with plans to merge it with its Albertsons chain. Following this, the 44 Randalls stores were re-aligned with the southern Louisiana and Florida Albertsons stores as the new "Houston" division of the company. The Tom Thumb stores were re-aligned with the North Texas Albertsons stores in the Southern division, effectively ending the connection between the two grocery chains. In November 2016, a store opened in Leander, Texas.

In mid-January 2017, the company announced that the South Katy store (serving Cinco Ranch) on 1525 South Mason Road (not to be confused with the 525 South Fry Road store, which remains open) would close in mid-February, bringing the division's store count to 29 stores in Greater Houston.

In early March 2017, the Cypress distribution center would be consolidated into Tom Thumb's Dallas–Fort Worth distribution center in Roanoke by late 2017. The Roanoke distribution center will now supply Albertsons, Tom Thumb, and Randalls stores in Texas, Louisiana, and Arkansas. Also, the Houston office would be consolidated into Albertson's existing office in Fort Worth by mid-2017.

On January 12, 2018, the Georgetown, Texas, store opened to the public. In early-April 2018, the Oak Forest and Alief stores were liquidated. The Cypress store closed in late-June 2018.

== Hurricane Relief Fund ==
Although many stores closed during Hurricane Ike, Randalls quickly reopened. The Galveston, Texas, store received heavy water damage due to the storm surge but managed to reopen shortly after the storm. The store's gas station was one of the first in Galveston to reopen.

After Hurricane Ike, Randalls partnered with KHOU Channel 11, 104.1 KRBE, and Jack FM for the Hurricane Ike Relief Fund in order to help those in need.

== Facilities ==
Prior to 2017, it had a distribution center in northwest Houston, but it closed that year with operations centered in the Dallas–Fort Worth area.

== Loyalty program ==
A mock-up of a Randalls Remarkable Card

Randalls offers a loyalty card (Remarkable Card) that provides a discount on some items, as well as a 3-cent discount on gasoline or a portion of sales proceeds donated to charity. The loyalty card is good at all Safeway stores. (Loyalty cards issued before the purchase by Safeway can only be used at Randalls and Tom Thumb stores; Safeway-branded loyalty cards can be used at Randalls and Tom Thumb exactly as in a Safeway-branded store.) The Power Pump Rewards owned by Safeway that previously allowed customers to spend $100 to receive a 10-cent gas discount was discontinued on September 12, 2009.
