= Robert B. Cullum =

American businessman

Robert Brooks Cullum (May 10, 1912 – December 11, 1981) was an American businessman and civic leader.

== Early life ==
Robert B. Cullum was born in Dallas, Texas on May 10, 1912, son of Ashley Wilson and Eloise (Brooks) Cullum. He attended North Dallas High School (where he played on the football team), transferred to Kemper Military School, and then to Southern Methodist University; he earned a bachelor's degree in journalism from SMU. He married Dorothy Dan Rogers.

== Business years ==
Cullum, along with brother Charles, took over the family's business, which gained control of Toro Food Stores. They later renamed the chain of failing food stores Tom Thumb Food Stores.

Cullum served on the board of directors of the State Fair of Texas, as president of the same from 1967 to 1969, served as president of the Dallas Chamber of Commerce from 1964 to 1965, and also served on the board of directors for Dallas Power and Light, the Dr Pepper Company, and the Republic National Bank of Dallas.

Cullum was a trustee on the board of the Southwestern Medical Foundation (which evolved to form the UT Southwestern Medical Center) and of the Callier Center for Communication Disorders. He was also one of the three negotiators that formed the Dallas-Fort Worth Regional Airport (now the DFW International Airport).

== Death and awards ==
In 1962, Cullum received the Linz Award for civic service to the city of Dallas, the Brotherhood Citation of the National Conference of Christians and Jews, and, in 1964, he was named the Dallas Press Club's Headliner of the Year.

Cullum died on December 11, 1981, in Dallas. He is buried at the Hillcrest Mausoleum.

Part of Texas State Highway 352, which runs in front of Fair Park (annual site of the State Fair of Texas), is named in his honor.
