= Arboretum (Austin, Texas) =

Upmarket retail trade area in Austin, Texas, U.S.

Coordinates: 30°23′33″N 97°44′55″W

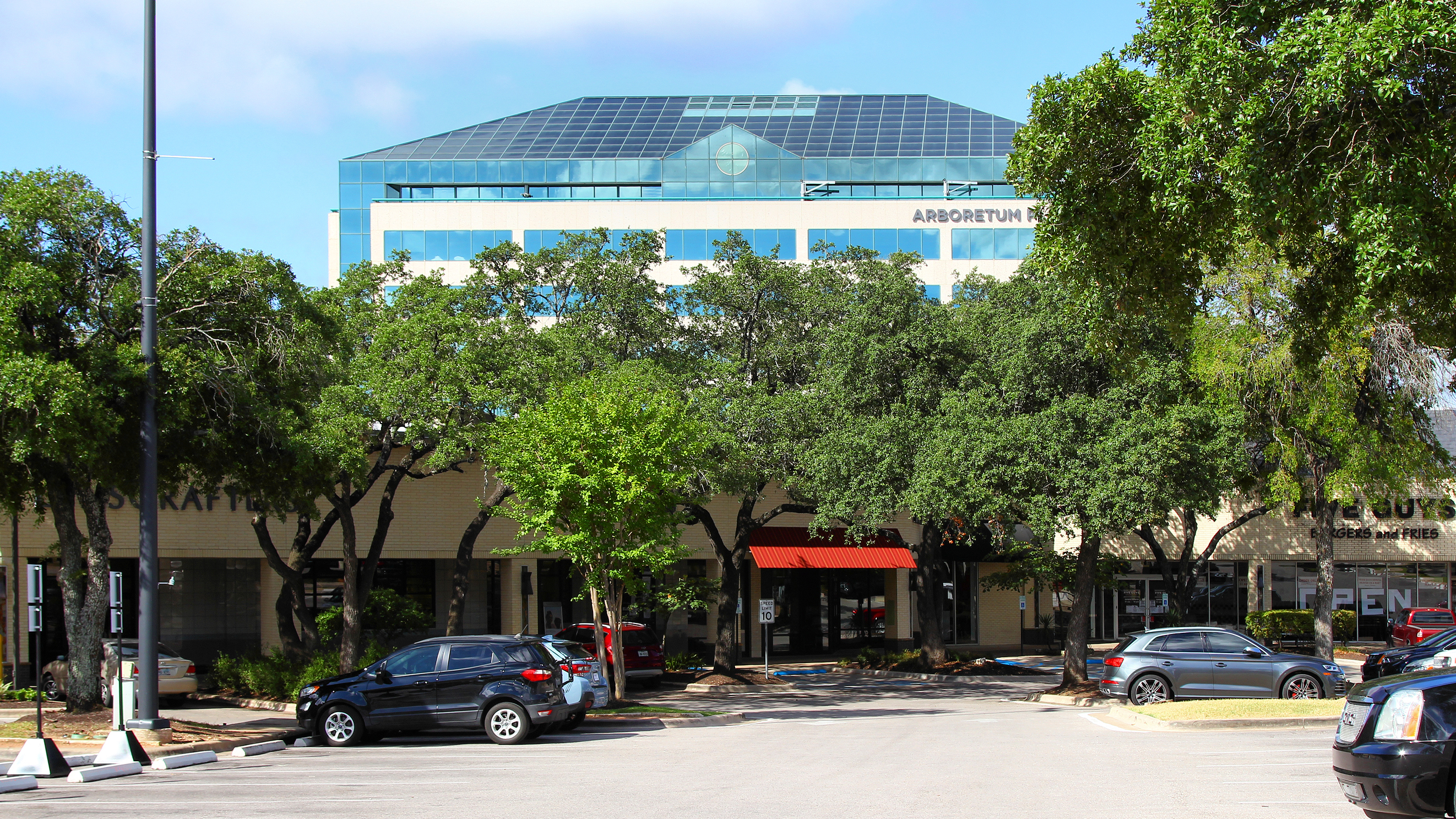
Many large trees shade the shops around The Arboretum.

The Arboretum is an upmarket retail trade area in the northwest portion of Austin, Texas, centered roughly on the convergence of U.S. Route 183, Anderson Lane, Capital of Texas Highway and Mopac Expressway.

== Arboretum at Great Hills ==
The 210,197-square-foot (19,527.9 m^{2}) Arboretum at Great Hills was developed by Trammell Crow Company, opened in 1985 and is managed by Simon Malls. It is the heavily wooded park-like atmosphere that gives the mall its arboreal name.

The Arboretum's first anchor tenant, which opened on Sept 10, 1986, was a 492-room hotel with 65,000 sqft of meeting space now known as the Renaissance Austin.

The open-air mall features several open park spaces, and a Renaissance Hotel, among other commercial establishments. The park spaces contain a set of five cow statues by sculptor Harold F. Clayton. It also formerly featured a movie theater - Arbor 7 Cinema - that participated in the South by Southwest film festival . The theater moved locations in 2002 and was replaced with The Cheesecake Factory .

The Arboretum was owned by Washington Prime Group from 1998 to February 2026 and by Asana Partners thereafter.

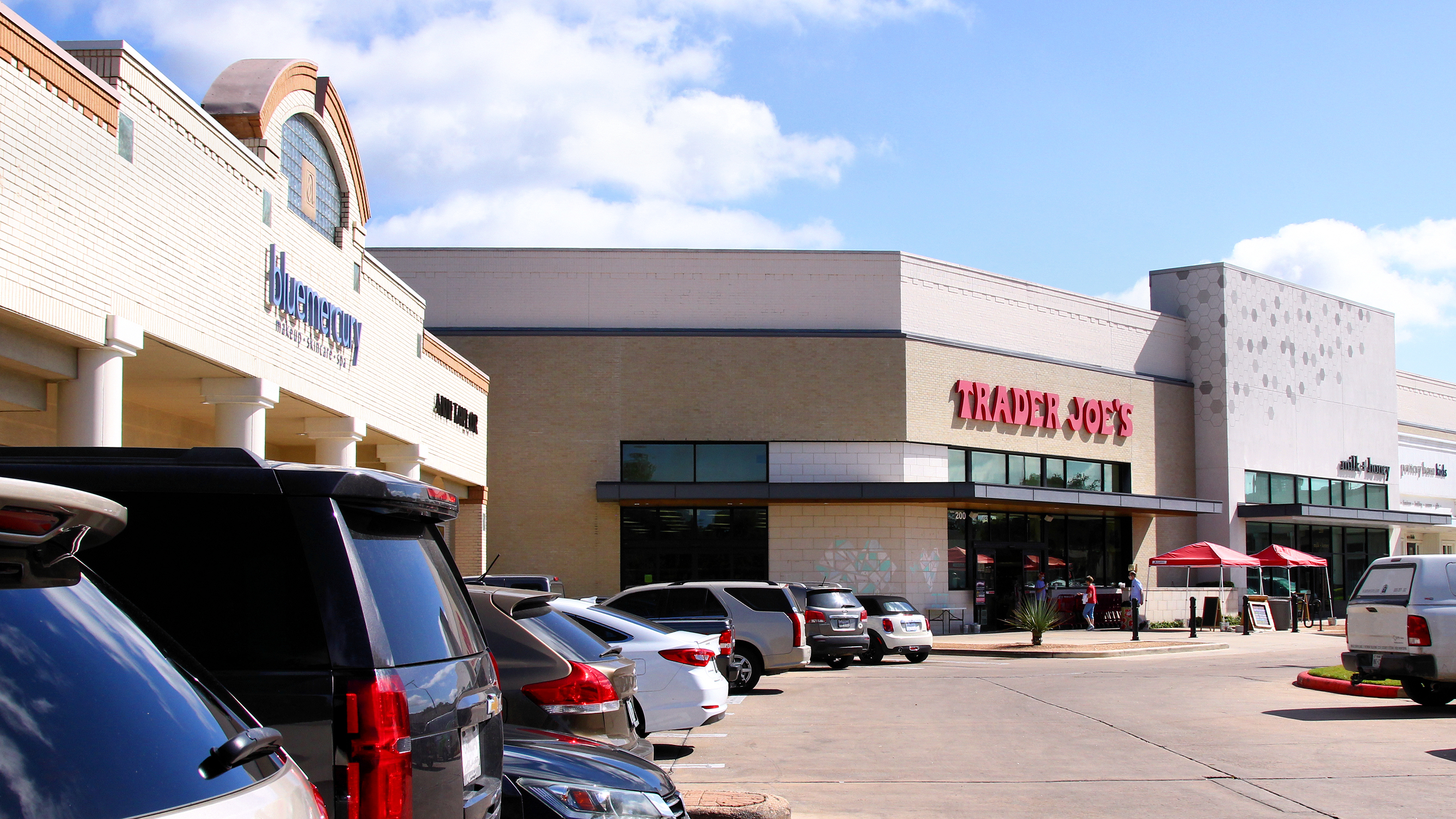
Trader Joe's at Arboretum Market

== Arboretum Market ==
The 105,190-square-foot (9,772 m^{2}) Arboretum Market opened across the street in 1987 and featured upmarket retailers such as the city's only Saks Fifth Avenue (now Trader Joe's) along with smaller specialty shops. The Saks space was previously a Simon David specialty grocer, which closed in December 1996 and was subsequently converted into Saks.

The Saks was 52,000–55,000 ft^{2} in size, opened November 15, 1997, and closed December 31, 2012. As of June 20, 2014 the former Saks store was converted to Trader Joe's.
