= List of supermarket chains in the United States =

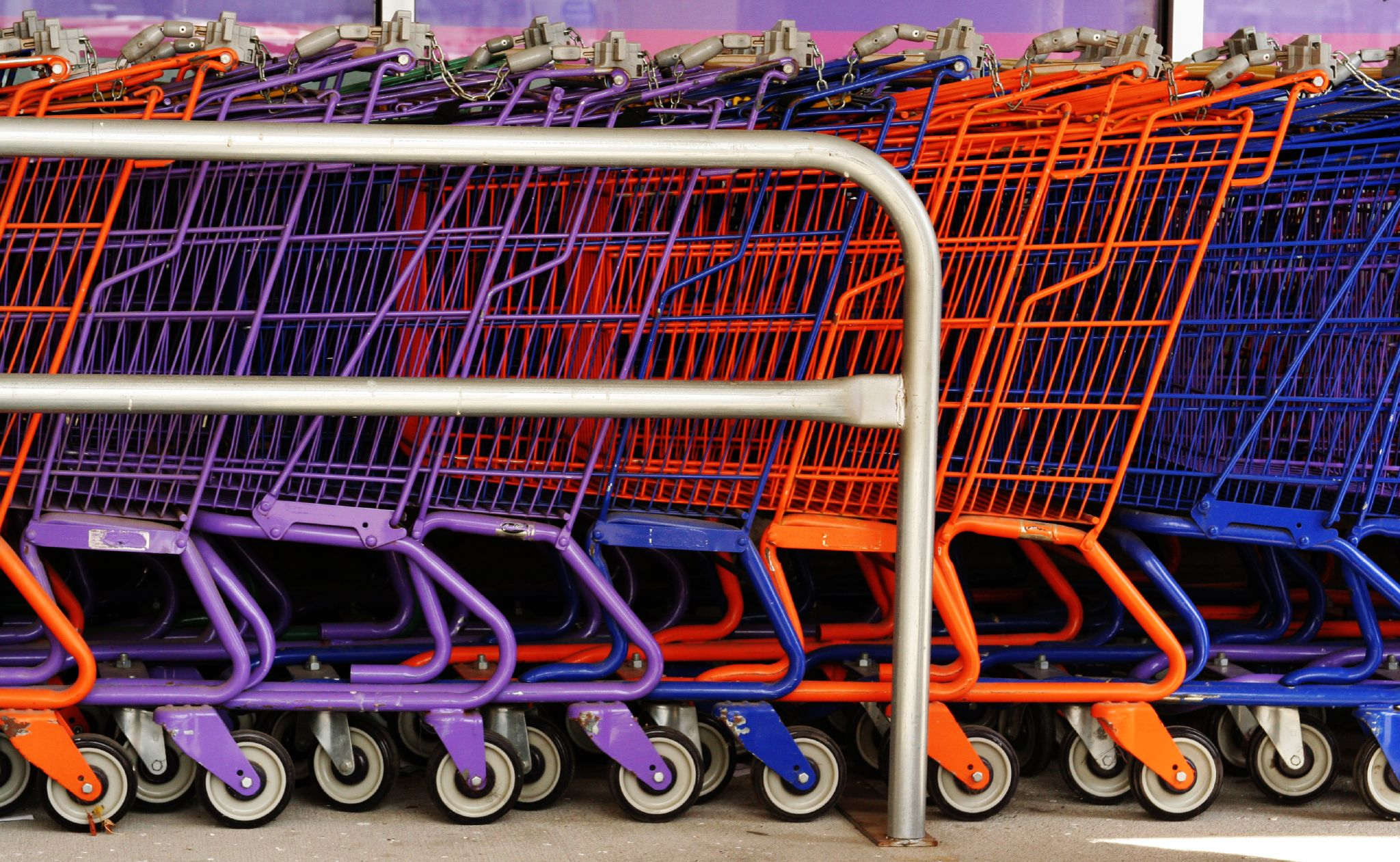
There are many large grocery retailers who operate under many different brands. The supermarket companies in the United States are organized in this article, but to see a worldwide list, see List of supermarket chains.

This is a list of supermarket companies in the United States and the names of supermarkets which are owned or franchised by these companies. For supermarkets worldwide, see List of supermarket chains.

== National chains ==
- Albertsons (Alaska, Arizona, Arkansas, California, Colorado, Connecticut, Delaware, Idaho, Illinois, Indiana, Iowa, Louisiana, Maine, Maryland, Massachusetts, Montana, Nevada, New Hampshire, New Jersey, New Mexico, New York, North Dakota, Oregon, Pennsylvania, Rhode Island, Texas, Utah, Vermont, Washington, Wyoming)
  - Acme Markets (Connecticut, New York, New Jersey, Pennsylvania, Delaware, and Maryland)
  - Haggen (Washington)
  - Jewel Osco (Illinois, Indiana)
  - Market Street (Texas, New Mexico)
  - Randalls and Tom Thumb (Texas)
  - Safeway (Alaska, Arizona, California, Colorado, Delaware, Hawaii, Idaho, Maryland, Montana, Nebraska, Nevada, New Mexico, Oregon, South Dakota, Virginia, District of Columbia, Washington, Wyoming)
  - Shaw's and Star Market (Maine, Massachusetts, New Hampshire, Rhode Island, Vermont)
  - Vons and Pavilions (California, Nevada)
- Amazon
  - Whole Foods Market
- Kroger (Alabama, Arkansas, Georgia, Illinois, Indiana, Kentucky, Michigan, Mississippi, Missouri, Ohio, South Carolina, Tennessee, Texas, Virginia, West Virginia)
  - Baker's (Nebraska)
  - City Market (Colorado, Utah, Wyoming)
  - Dillons (Kansas)
  - Food 4 Less (California, Illinois, Indiana)
  - Fred Meyer (Alaska, Idaho, Oregon, Washington)
  - Fry's (Arizona)
  - Gerbes (Missouri)
  - Harris Teeter (Delaware, Florida, Georgia, Maryland, North Carolina, South Carolina, Virginia, District of Columbia)
  - JayC (Indiana)
  - King Soopers (Colorado, Wyoming)
  - Mariano's (Illinois)
  - Pay Less (Indiana)
  - QFC (Oregon, Washington)
  - Ralphs (Southern California)
  - Roundy's (Illinois, Wisconsin)
  - Ruler Foods (Illinois, Indiana, Kentucky, Missouri, Ohio, Tennessee)
  - Smith's Food and Drug (Arizona, Idaho, Montana, Nevada, New Mexico, Utah, Wyoming)
- Costco
- BJ’s Wholesale Club (Alabama, Connecticut, Delaware, Florida, Georgia, Indiana, Kentucky, Maine, Maryland, Massachusetts, Michigan, New Hampshire, New Jersey, New York, North Carolina, Ohio, Pennsylvania, Rhode Island, South Carolina, Tennessee, Texas, Virginia)
- Target
- Walmart
  - Walmart Neighborhood Market
  - Sam's Club

== Regional chains ==
=== East ===
Name	Areas served	Year founded	Headquarters	Associated supermarket brands
Ahold Delhaize	Connecticut, Delaware, Georgia, Kentucky, Maine, Maryland, Massachusetts, New Hampshire, New York, New Jersey, North Carolina, Pennsylvania, Rhode Island, South Carolina, Tennessee, Vermont, Virginia, West Virginia, Washington D.C.	2016	Zaandam, Netherlands	Food Lion, Giant, Giant Food, Hannaford, Stop & Shop

=== West ===
Name	Areas served	Year founded	Headquarters	Associated supermarket brands
Raley's Supermarkets	California, Nevada, Arizona, New Mexico, Oregon, Washington and Alaska	1935	West Sacramento, California	Bel Air Markets, Nob Hill Foods, Bashas', AJ's Fine Foods
Save Mart	California and Nevada	1952	Modesto, California	Lucky, Lucky California, FoodMaxx, Maxx Value Foods
Smart & Final	California, Arizona, Nevada and northern Mexico	1871	Commerce, California	
Stater Bros.	Southern California	1936	Yucaipa, California	
WinCo Foods	Arizona, California, Idaho, Montana, Nevada, Oklahoma, Oregon, Texas, Utah, and Washington	1967	Boise, Idaho	
Lin’s Fresh Market	Utah and Nevada	1966	Cedar City, Utah	

=== Midwest ===
Name	Areas served	Year founded	Headquarters	Associated supermarket brands
Coborn's, Inc.	Illinois, Michigan, Minnesota, North Dakota, South Dakota, Wisconsin	1921	St. Cloud, Minnesota	Coborn's, Cash Wise, MarketPlace Foods, Hornbacher's, Tadych's MarketPlace, Sullivan's Foods, Captain Jack's Liquor Land, Andy's Liquor
Hy-Vee	Illinois, Indiana, Iowa, Kansas, Minnesota, Missouri, Nebraska, South Dakota, Wisconsin	1930	West Des Moines, Iowa	Dollar Fresh, Strack & Van Til
Meijer	Illinois, Indiana, Kentucky, Michigan, Ohio, Wisconsin, Pennsylvania	1934	Walker, Michigan	Fresh Thyme Market (Wisconsin, Illinois, Indiana, Michigan, Minnesota, Missouri, Ohio, Iowa, Kentucky, Pennsylvania, and Minnesota)
Schnucks	Illinois, Indiana, Missouri, Wisconsin	1939	St. Louis, Missouri	
Fareway	Iowa, Illinois, Minnesota, Nebraska, South Dakota, Kansas, Missouri	1938	Boone, Iowa	
Marketplace Foods	Minnesota, North Dakota	1952	Bemidji, Minnesota	
KJ's Fresh Market	Minnesota, Wisconsin	1952	Bemidji, Minnesota	
Harps Food Stores	Arkansas, Oklahoma, Missouri, Kansas, Louisiana	1930	Springdale, Arkansas	Food 4 Less, 10Box Cost Plus, Warehouse Market, The Markets, CashSave

=== Northeast ===
Name	Areas served	Year founded	Headquarters	Associated supermarket brands
ShopRite	Connecticut, Delaware, Maryland, New Jersey, New York, Pennsylvania	1946	Keasbey, New Jersey	Price Rite
Price Chopper	Upstate New York, Vermont, Connecticut, Massachusetts, New Hampshire, Pennsylvania	1932	Schenectady, New York	Market 32
Weis Markets	Pennsylvania, Maryland, New York, New Jersey, West Virginia, Virginia, Delaware	1912	Sunbury, Pennsylvania	
Wegmans	New York, Pennsylvania, New Jersey, Maryland, Massachusetts, Virginia, North Carolina, Delaware, Washington, D.C., Connecticut	1916	Rochester, New York	
Tops	Upstate New York, Vermont, northern Pennsylvania	1962	Williamsville, New York	
Giant Eagle	Pennsylvania, Ohio, West Virginia, Indiana, Maryland	1931	O'Hara Township, Pennsylvania	Giant Eagle Express, Market District, Market District Express
Market Basket	New Hampshire, Massachusetts, Maine, Rhode Island	1917	Tewksbury, Massachusetts	
Foodtown	New Jersey, New York, Pennsylvania, Connecticut	1955	Iselin, New Jersey	Greenway Markets

=== South ===
Name	Areas served	Year founded	Headquarters	Associated supermarket brands
Alex Lee Inc.	Georgia, North Carolina, South Carolina, Virginia	1931	Hickory, North Carolina	Lowes Foods, KJ's Market, IGA Southeast
Brookshire's	Arkansas, Louisiana, Oklahoma, Texas	1928	Tyler, Texas	Brookshire's, Super 1 Foods, Fresh by Brookshire's, Spring Market, Reasor's.
Food City	Alabama, Georgia, Kentucky, Virginia, Tennessee	1955	Abingdon, Virginia	
Ingles Markets	Alabama, Georgia, South Carolina, North Carolina, Tennessee, Virginia	1963	Black Mountain, North Carolina	
Piggly Wiggly	Alabama, Arkansas, Florida, Georgia, Illinois, Indiana, Kentucky, Louisiana, Mississippi, Missouri, North Carolina, North Dakota, Ohio, Oklahoma, South Carolina, Tennessee, Virginia, West Virginia, Wisconsin	1916	Keene, New Hampshire	
Publix	Florida, Georgia, Alabama, South Carolina, Tennessee, North Carolina, Virginia, Kentucky	1930	Lakeland, Florida	GreenWise Market
Winn-Dixie	Florida, Georgia, Alabama, Louisiana, Mississippi	1925	Jacksonville, Florida	

== Notable local chains ==
- Acme Fresh Market (Northeastern Ohio)
- Amigo Supermarkets (Puerto Rico)
- Associated Supermarkets (New York)
- Berkeley Bowl (Berkeley, California)
- Big Y (Massachusetts and Connecticut)
- Boyer's Food Markets (Pennsylvania)
- Bristol Farms (California)
- Brookshire Brothers (Texas)
- Buehler's (North-central Ohio)
- Busch's Fresh Food Market (Michigan)
- Cee Bee Food Stores (Kentucky, Tennessee)
- Central Market (Texas)
- Crest Foods (Oklahoma)
- Cub Foods (Minnesota and one location in Freeport, Illinois)
- D'Agostino Supermarkets (New York City)
- Dave's Markets (Ohio)
- Dierbergs Markets (St. Louis area)
- Erewhon (California)
- Fairway Market (New York City area)
- Festival Foods (Wisconsin)
- Food Bazaar (New York, New Jersey, Connecticut)
- The Food Emporium (New York City area)
- Food Town (Houston, Texas)
- Foodarama (Houston, Texas)
- Foodfair (Huntington, WV and surrounding area)
- Foodland (Hawaii)
- FoodLand Supermarkets (Alabama, Georgia, South Carolina, North Carolina, Tennessee, Kentucky, West Virginia, Pennsylvania, Ohio)
- Foodtown (New Jersey, New York, Pennsylvania)
- Food King (Colorado, New Mexico, Texas)
- Food Rite (West Tennessee)
- Fresh Encounters (Ohio)
- Gelson's Markets (Southern California)
- Giant Food (Delaware, Maryland, Virginia, D.C.)
- Gristedes (New York City)
- Harding's – Harding's Market, Marketplace, and Fresh Express (Southwest Michigan, Northern Indiana) – sells SpartanNash OurFamily Products
- Harmons Grocery (Utah)
- H-E-B (Texas, Northern Mexico)
- Heinen's (Cleveland and Chicago metro areas)
- Highland Park Markets (Connecticut)
- Hitchcock's Markets (Florida)
- Homeland (Kansas, Oklahoma, Georgia, Texas)
- Houchens Markets (Kentucky, Tennessee, Ohio, Indiana, Illinois)
- Hugo's (Minnesota, North Dakota)
- Jerry's Foods (Minnesota)
- Jewel-Osco (Chicago, Illinois)
- Jon's Marketplace (Southern California)
- Karns Quality Foods (Harrisburg, Pennsylvania area)
- Key Food (New York City metro area)
- King Kullen (Long Island, New York)
- Kowalski's Markets (Minnesota)
- Kuhn's Quality Foods (Pittsburgh, Pennsylvania)
- Lowe's Market (Texas, New Mexico)
- Lunds & Byerlys (Minnesota)
- Magruder's (Washington, D.C. area)
- Marc's (Cleveland, Ohio)
- Mardens (Maine)
- Market Basket (Southeastern Texas, Southwestern Louisiana)
- Market Basket (New England) (Maine, Massachusetts, New Hampshire, Rhode Island)
- Market of Choice (Oregon)
- Met Foodmarkets (New York City, New Jersey, Massachusetts)
- Morton Williams (New York, New Jersey)
- Moser's Foods (Missouri)
- Mother's Market & Kitchen (California)
- Mr. Special (Puerto Rico)
- No Frills Supermarkets (Omaha, Nebraska)
- New Seasons Market (Portland, Oregon)
- Nugget Markets (Northern California)
- Price Chopper (Kansas City & Des Moines metro areas)
- Pueblo (Puerto Rico)
- Pac n Save (Rural Nebraska)
- Quality Dairy Company (Mid-Michigan)
- Redner's Markets (Eastern Pennsylvania; also in Delaware and Maryland)
- Remke Markets (Cincinnati, Ohio area)
- Ridley's Family Markets (Idaho, Nevada, Utah, Wyoming)
- Riesbeck's (West Virginia, Ohio)
- Roche Bros (Massachusetts)
- Rosauers Supermarkets (Idaho, Montana, Oregon, Washington)
- Rouses (Alabama, Louisiana, Mississippi)
- Scolari's Food and Drug (California, Nevada)
- Seabra Foods (New Jersey, South Florida, Rhode Island, Massachusetts)
- Seller's Brothers (Houston, Texas)
- Sendik's Food Market (Wisconsin)
- Sentry Foods (Wisconsin)
- Shoppers Food & Pharmacy (Baltimore and Washington, D.C. areas)
- Sleeper's Supermarket (Maine)
- Stew Leonard's (Connecticut, New York, New Jersey)
- Straub's Markets (St. Louis, Missouri)
- Sullivan's Foods (Northwest Illinois)
- SuperFresh (New York, New Jersey)
- Super One Foods (Minnesota, Wisconsin, Michigan, North Dakota)
- Super King Markets (Greater Los Angeles)
- Supermercados Selectos (Puerto Rico)
- The Fresh Grocer (New Jersey, New York, Pennsylvania)
- Times Supermarkets (Hawaii)
- Trucchi's (Massachusetts)
- United Grocery Outlet (Tennessee, North Carolina)
- Westborn Market (Michigan)
- Western Beef (New York City, Florida)
- Woodman's Markets (Illinois, Wisconsin)
- Yoke's Fresh Market (Washington, Idaho)

== Retailers' cooperatives ==
- Associated Food Stores – formerly Pacific Mercantile Cooperative; also see Western Family Foods
  - Lee's Marketplace
- Associated Grocers of New England
- Associated Grocers of the South
- Associated Wholesale Grocers
  - Apple Market
  - Cash Saver
  - Country Mart
  - Price Chopper / Price Mart (Kansas City, Missouri area) – unrelated to Price Chopper in the Northeast
  - SunFresh
  - ThriftWay
- C-Town
- Great Valu (Delaware, Maryland, New Jersey, North Carolina, Virginia, West Virginia)
- IGA
- Thrift Way / Shop n Bag (New Jersey; Philadelphia)
- Topco Associates LLC
  - Affiliated Foods
  - Associated Food Stores
  - Associated Grocers – www.agbr.com
  - Associated Grocers of New England
  - Associated Grocers of the South
  - Associated Wholesale Grocers
- Wakefern Food Corporation
  - The Fresh Grocer (Pennsylvania)
    - Gerrity's Supermarkets
    - Nicholas Markets

== Wholesalers ==
- C&S Wholesale Grocers
- SpartanNash (in addition to directly owning a variety of Midwestern supermarket chains, SpartanNash is also a supplier for smaller, independent supermarkets)
- United Natural Foods
  - SuperValu

== Deep-discount and limited-assortment chains ==
- Aldi – Owned by Aldi Süd
- Big Lots
- Dollar General
- Family Dollar
- Five Below
- Grocery Outlet (California, Delaware, New Jersey, Ohio, Oregon, Idaho, Nevada, Washington, Maryland and Pennsylvania)
- Lidl
- Save A Lot
- Trader Joe's – Owned by Aldi Nord
- WinCo Foods (Arizona, California, Oklahoma, Oregon, Idaho, Nevada, Texas, Utah, Washington)

== Ethnic chains ==
=== Chinese/Vietnamese or Pan-Asian ===
- 99 Ranch Market – the largest Asian-American supermarket chain on the West Coast with additional locations in Nevada, Texas, Virginia, Maryland, New Jersey, and Massachusetts. Also owns 168 Market in California and Nevada.
- Ai Hoa Supermarket – formerly a Chinese-Vietnamese-American chain in Southern California; now operates one store in South El Monte
- Asian Food Center (New Jersey)
- CAM Asian Market (Ohio)
- C-Mart Supermarket (Boston)
- Food Maxx International (Virginia)
- Fei Long Market (New York)
- Fresh International Market, Pan-Asian and international supermarket chain (Michigan, Indiana, Illinois, Missouri, North Carolina)
- Global Food International (Maryland, Virginia)
- Good Fortune Supermarket (New York, New Jersey, Virginia, Texas, Rhode Island and California)
- Great Wall Supermarket (Georgia, Massachusetts, New Jersey, New York, Virginia)
- Hoa Binh Supermarket – Vietnamese-Chinese chain in California.
- H K Market
- Hong Kong Food Market – Vietnamese supermarket (Louisiana)
- Hong Kong Supermarket – Chinese-American supermarket chain
- J-mart (New York)
- Kam Man Food (New York, New Jersey, Massachusetts) – small Asian-American supermarket chain
- Lion Food (Northern California) – Vietnamese-Chinese supermarket
- Metro Supermarket – Chinese-American supermarket in Southern California
- O-Mart, Super Oriental Market (Killeen, Texas)
- Ocean Mart (Utah)
- Pacific Ocean Marketplace (Colorado)
- Sieu Thi ABC – Chinese/Vietnamese-American in Southern California
- Skyfood Supermarket (six locations in New York) – Asian Oriental Supermarket. First oriental e-commerce supermarket to offer local delivery and nationwide shipping.
- Shun Fat Supermarket (California, Nevada, Texas, Oregon) – Chinese Vietnamese American chain
- zTao Marketplace (Texas, Georgia) – Asian-American supermarket

=== Korean ===
- Arirang Market – Korean chain from Southern California
- ASSI Plaza, Korean-American multinational supermarket chain (Georgia, Illinois, Pennsylvania)
- Galleria Market (Southern California) – Korean-American
- Greenland Market – Korean-American chain in Southern California
- Grand Mart, Korean-American supermarket chain (Washington, D.C., Virginia, North Carolina and Georgia)
- Hannam (New Jersey, California)
- Hanyang Mart (New York, New Jersey)
- H Mart, Han Ah Reum – the largest Asian-American and the largest Korean-American chain in the United States (California, Colorado, Georgia, Illinois, Louisiana, Maryland, Massachusetts, Michigan, New Jersey, New York, North Carolina, Oregon, Pennsylvania, Texas, Virginia, Washington) – Korean-American supermarket chain
- Lotte Plaza – Korean-American supermarket (Maryland, Virginia)
- Nam Dae Mun Farmers Market (Georgia)
- Super G Mart, Korean-American supermarket (Charlotte, North Carolina)
- Zion Market – Korean-American chain in California, Georgia, and Texas

=== Japanese ===
- Marukai – Japanese-American supermarket in California and Hawaii, also owns Tokyo Central.
- Mitsuwa (New Jersey, Illinois, California, Hawaii, Texas) – Japanese-American supermarket and shopping center
- Nijiya Market (California, Hawaii) – organic Japanese-American supermarket
- Seiwa Market – Japanese-American in California and Texas
- Uwajimaya (Seattle, Washington; Portland, Oregon)

=== Filipino ===
- 88 Ranch Marketplace in Southern California
- Island Pacific Supermarket (California, Nevada) – Filipino-American supermarket
- Seafood City (California, Hawaii, Washington, Nevada, Illinois) – Filipino-American supermarket

=== Indian/South Asian ===
- India Bazaar/IndiaCo (Texas, Illinois, Georgia) – Indian supermarket chain mainly in Dallas-Fort Worth Metroplex
- Indopak Supermarket and Cafe - Indian, Pakistani supermarket chain in Dallas-Fort Worth Metroplex
- New India Bazar (California) – small Indian, Pakistani and Sri-Lankan supermarket chain in San Francisco Bay Area
- Patel Brothers – largest Indian-American supermarket chain
- Rani's World Foods (Texas & Nevada) – Indian supermarket chain
- Subzi Bazaar (New Jersey and New York) – South East Asian/Indian Grocery Stores

=== Hispanic/Latino ===
- Bravo (Northeast and Florida)
- El Ahorro Supermarket – (Texas)
- Fiesta Mart – Latino-American supermarket (Texas)
- Mi Pueblo Food Center (Northern California/San Francisco Bay Area) – Now merged with Cardenas (Southern California) since late 2017
- Mi Tienda – Hispanic supermarket division of H-E-B Stores (two stores in Houston, Texas)
- La Michoacana Meat Market (Texas)
- Nam Dae Mun Farmers Market (Georgia)
- Número Uno Market – Hispanic chain (Los Angeles area) – Now merged with Superior
- Ideal Market (Louisiana)
- La Perla Tapatía Supermarkets – (California)
- La Placita – Hispanic chain in New Orleans area
- Presidente (South Florida – Miami-Dade, Broward & Palm Beach counties)
- Pro's Ranch Market / Los Altos Ranch Market – Hispanic (Arizona, California, New Mexico, Texas)
- Publix Sabor – Hispanic, operated by Publix
- El Pueblo (Newark) – largest Latino supermarket in New Jersey
- R Ranch Markets – Hispanic chain in Southern California
- El Ranchito (Georgia)
- El Rancho – growing independent Hispanic chain in the Dallas/Fort Worth, Texas area
- Rancho Liborio (California, Nevada, Colorado)
- Rancho Markets (Utah)
- El Rey (Wisconsin)
- El Rey (California)
- El Río Grande Latin Market (Texas)
- Northgate González Market (California)
- Rio Ranch Markets – Southern California – merged with Cardenas
- Saver's Cost Plus (Texas)
- Sedano's – Hispanic chain in Southern Florida
- Seller's Bros. (Houston, Texas)
- El Super (Los Angeles, Southern Nevada and Phoenix, Arizona)
- La Bonita (Southern Nevada)
- Super Market México – online purveyor of Mexican foods
- Superior Super Warehouse – Hispanic warehouse supermarket chain in Southern California
- Supermercado El Rancho – Hispanic supermarket chain in Texas
- Supermercados Teloloapan (Texas)
- Supersaver Foods – Hispanic-geared; operated by Albertsons LLC; chain now closed except for a few stores in Utah
- Super A Foods – Los Angeles county
- Talpa Supermercardos (Georgia)
- Tenochtitlán Market (Utah) – upscale Latin-American
- Terry's / El Mariachi Supermarkets – Hispanic chain (Dallas/Fort Worth, Texas; Oklahoma City)
- Tresierras Supermarkets – (Southern California)
- Twin City Supermarket – Hispanic chain (New Jersey)
- Vallarta Supermarkets (California) – caters to the growing Hispanic and Latino population of California and sells items usually not found in more Anglo-oriented American supermarkets
- Viva Markets (Utah) – Hispanic grocery market and mini-mall

=== Italian ===
- Caraluzzi's (Connecticut)
- Livoti’s Old World Market – New Jersey
- Uncle Giuseppe’s – New York and New Jersey

=== Kosher ===
- Motty's (Spring Valley, New York)
- New Day (Spring Valley, New York)
- Wesley Kosher (Monsey, New York)
- Evergreen (Monsey, Pomana, New York – Lakewood, New Jersey)
- Seasons – (New York, New Jersey)
- Seven Mile Market (Pikesville, Maryland), the largest Kosher store in the US
- Breadberry (New York, New Jersey)
- Rockland Kosher (Monsey, New York)
- Grand & Essex (New Jersey)
- Western Kosher (Los Angeles)
- The Market Place (Brooklyn)
- Kosher Konnection (New Jersey)
- Gourmet Glatt (Brooklyn, Cedarhurst, Monsey, Lakewood, Woodmere)
- Gleiberman's Gourmet (Charlotte, North Carolina)
- Bingo Wholesale (Brooklyn, Monsey, Lakewood, Inwood)

== Specialty and natural foods ==
- Busch’s Fresh Food Market (southeastern Michigan)
- The Fresh Market (Alabama, Arkansas, Arizona, California, Colorado, Connecticut, Delaware, Florida, Georgia, Illinois, Iowa, Indiana, Kansas, Kentucky, District of Columbia, Virginia, West Virginia, New Jersey, New York, North Carolina, South Carolina, Tennessee, Virginia, Ohio, Oklahoma, Oregon, Colorado, Florida, Idaho, Louisiana, Michigan, Minnesota, Mississippi, Missouri, Montana, Nebraska, Nevada, New Mexico, North Dakota, South Dakota, Texas, Utah, Washington, Wisconsin, Wyoming, Maryland, Massachusetts, Hawaii, Alaska, New Hampshire, Maine, Rhode Island and Pennsylvania)
- Publix Green Wise – Alabama, Florida
- Sprouts Farmers Market
- Trader Joe's – Owned by Aldi Nord
- Whole Foods – Sold To Amazon in 2017
- Fresh Thyme Market
- Natural Grocers
- Earth Fare

== See also ==
- List of hypermarkets in the United States
- Retailer Owned Food Distributors & Associates (trade association)
- UFCW (labor union)
