= La Michoacana =

La Michoacana may refer to:

- La Michoacana Meat Market, a U.S. chain of grocery stores
- Paletería La Michoacana, Mexico's largest chain of ice cream and popsicle shops
