= Riesbeck =

Riesbeck may refer to:

- Riesbeck's Food Markets, an American grocery chain with locations in Ohio and West Virginia
- Robert Riesbeck, CEO of American consumer electronics retailer hhgregg
