= Foodshed.io =

Food chain supply company

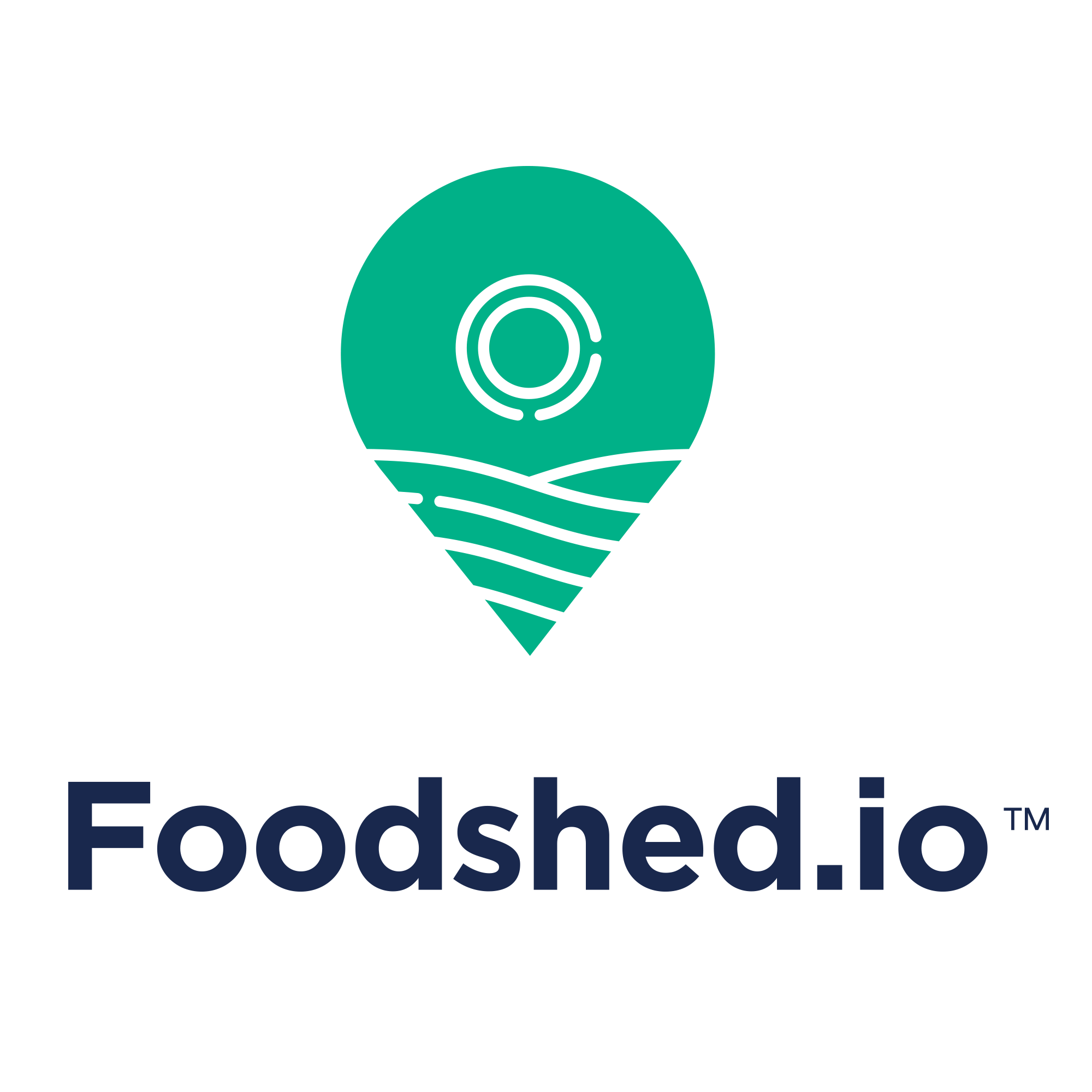
- Industry: Wholesale local produce
- Founded: 2016
- Founder: Clare Sullivan; Thomas Hallaran; Daniel Beckmann, PhD
- Headquarters: Livingston, MT
- Products: Foodshed.io Web and Mobile App
- Services: Mobile app; Logistics; Food Safety
- Website: foodshed.io

Foodshed.io is an agricultural technology company that specializes in local food supply chains. They partner with restaurants, universities, and grocery store retailers to source local produce and other food products. The company is based in St. Louis, Missouri.

== History ==
Foodshed.io was founded in 2016 by Daniel Beckmann PhD, Clare Sullivan, and Thomas Hallaran. The company operates in the Midwestern United States, and in 2019 joined the St. Louis Yield Lab incubator.

In 2020, they partnered with St. Louis based grocery store chain Schnucks Markets to expand relationships with local farmers. Trackers are placed in produce bins allowing food to be traced from farm to grocery store, and customers are alerted when fresh produce arrives in the store. By September 2021, the Schnucks local produce program grew by 173% over one year by utilizing the Foodshed.io platform.

Foodshed was a member of Chipotle Mexican Grill's 2021, "Aluminaries project".

In 2025, they partnered with Fresh Thyme Market and implemented their technology into six stores in Chicago and Indianapolis.

In 2026, they partnered with Fox Packaging to help farmers package smaller volumes of produce.

== Services ==
=== Technology ===
Foodshed.io has an application that is available for mobile or web. The platform allows farmers to list produce and other goods for buyers within a 250-mile radius. The local inventory is aggregated from a network of local farms to create a market where buyers can place all of their orders. It is currently in use at Schnucks markets.

=== Food Safety ===
For retail institutions requiring a USDA GAP Certification, Foodshed.io prepares farmers to become certified.

=== Environmental Impact ===
The company works with local growers to help minimize the environmental impact of their farming. This includes crop rotation and topsoil preservation, as well as reducing food waste and food miles.
