= Trucchi =

Trucchi is a surname. Notable people with the surname include:

- Lorenza Trucchi (1922–2026), Italian journalist and art critic
- William Trucchi Sr. (fl. 1920s–1950s), founder of Trucchi's, an American supermarket chain
