= C-Town (disambiguation) =

C-Town may refer to:

- C-Town, a supermarket chain
- C Town, a shopping complex in Amman, Jordan
