= Food City =

Food City may refer to:

Food stores

- Food City (K-VA-T), an American supermarket chain with stores located in Georgia, Kentucky, Tennessee, Alabama, and Virginia
- Food City, an Arizona ethnic/specialty food store chain acquired by Bashas' in 1993, previously known as Southwest Supermarkets
- Food City (Canada), a Canadian supermarket chain formerly operated by the Oshawa Group, which has been taken over by Sobeys
- Davis Food City, a chain of supermarkets in Houston, Texas

Motorsports

- Food City 500, a NASCAR Cup Series stock car race held at Bristol Motor Speedway
- Food City 300, a NASCAR Xfinity Series stock car race held at Bristol Motor Speedway
