= Fresh 15 Road Race =

- Date: March 7, 2020
- Location: Tyler, TX
- Event type: Road
- Distance: 15K, 5K, Kids 1K
- Established: 2014
- Course records: Men: 44:39 Women: 48:41
- Website: www.fresh15k.com

The FRESH 15 Road Race is a USATF-certified 15-kilometer (9.3 mi) road race in Tyler, TX, United States. The race draws runners from all over the region and the nation. The race day also includes a 5-kilometer (3.1 mi) race and the Lil FRESHie 1k, a race for kids ages 12 and under (0.62 mi).

The FRESH 15 is produced by Tyler, Texas-based regional grocery chain Brookshire Grocery Co.

The first FRESH 15 was held March 1, 2014. The race is traditionally held on the first Saturday in March. The race is sponsored by consumer product goods companies, including Hormel Foods, Dannon, Keebler Company, Kellogg's, UNFI and Muscle Milk as well as local companies and community organizations. A signature piece of the event is the legendary FRESH 15 "swag bag" consisting of a grocery bag full of snacks, coupons and other goodies given to all participants.

The race supports multiple local charities and non-profit organizations by giving 100% of race revenue to local charities. The FRESH 15 has raised more than $1.5 million for charity.

The race draws a large crowd and gives out cash prizes to winners.

	Race Day
Year 1	Saturday, March 1, 2014
Year 2	Saturday, March 7, 2015
Year 3	Saturday, March 5, 2016
Year 4	Saturday, March 4, 2017
Year 5	Saturday, March 3, 2018
Year 6	Saturday, March 2, 2019
Year 7	Saturday, March 7, 2020
Year 8	Saturday, May 15, 2021
Year 9	Saturday, March 5, 2022
Year 10	Saturday, March 4, 2023
Year 11	Saturday, March 2, 2024

Current Course Records: Male | 43:22 - Raymond Magut & Female | 47:30 - Caroline Kipkirui
