= Krasdale Foods =

Food company in White Plains, New York, US

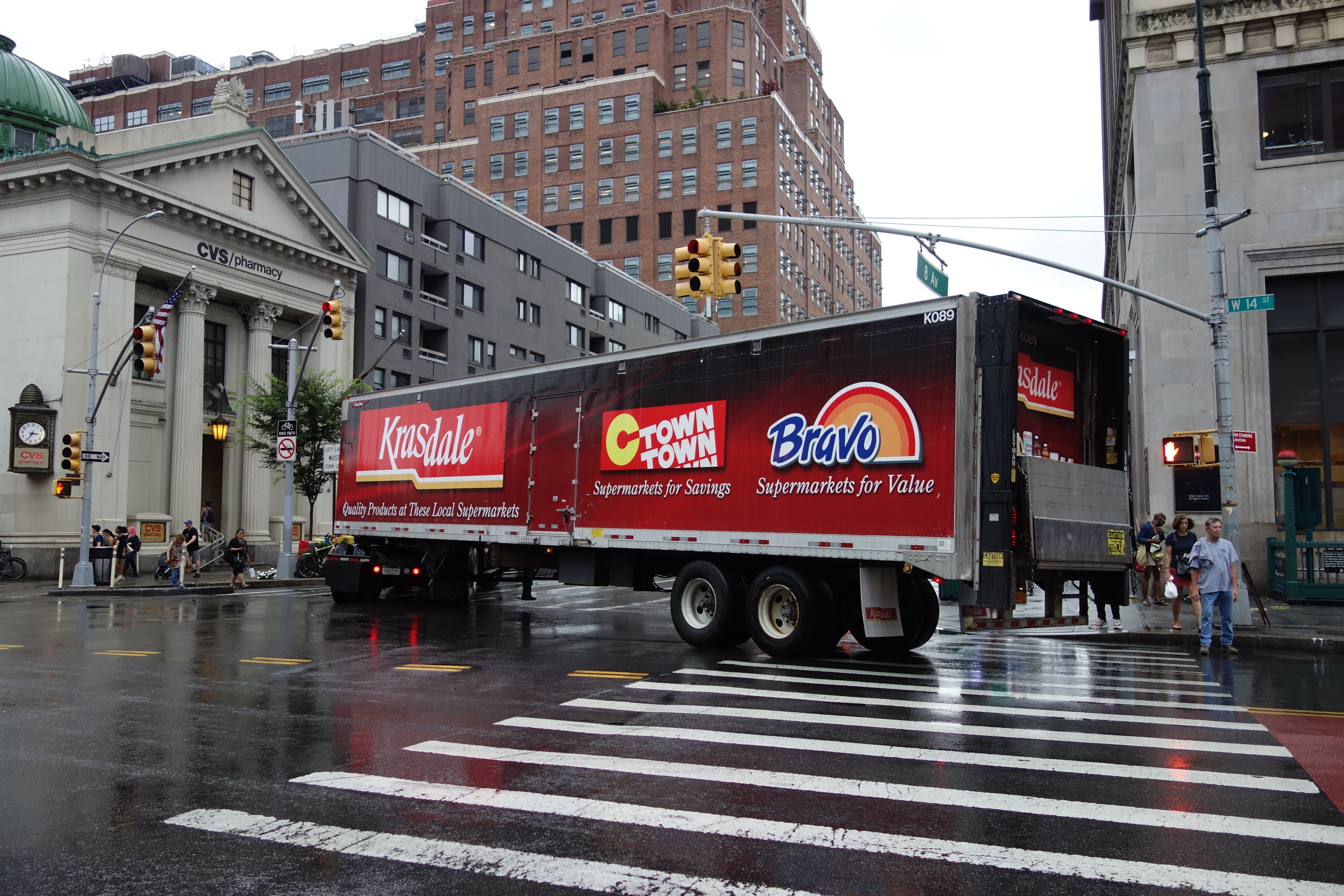
A Krasdale truck on 14th Street in Manhattan.

Krasdale Foods is an independent grocery wholesaler which supplies more than 7,000 products to food retailers, mostly in the New York City metropolitan area. The company owns private label foods and items such as frozen pizza, ice cream, ice cream pops, napkins, cream cheese, bagels, milk, etc.

Abraham Krasne founded the company as A. Krasne Inc. in 1908. Krasdale Foods adopted its current company name in 1972. The same year, Krasdale moved to their current location in Hunts Point, Bronx.

From Krasdale Foods' distribution center in the Bronx, the company offers Krasdale-labeled, private-label, and regional brands, as well as ethnic and specialty food items.

Krasdale Foods is headquartered in White Plains, New York. It supplies regional chains, such as Bravo and C-Town Supermarkets, as well as single-location grocery stores.
