= Lucky's Market =

Colorado supermarket

LM Acquisition Co. LLC

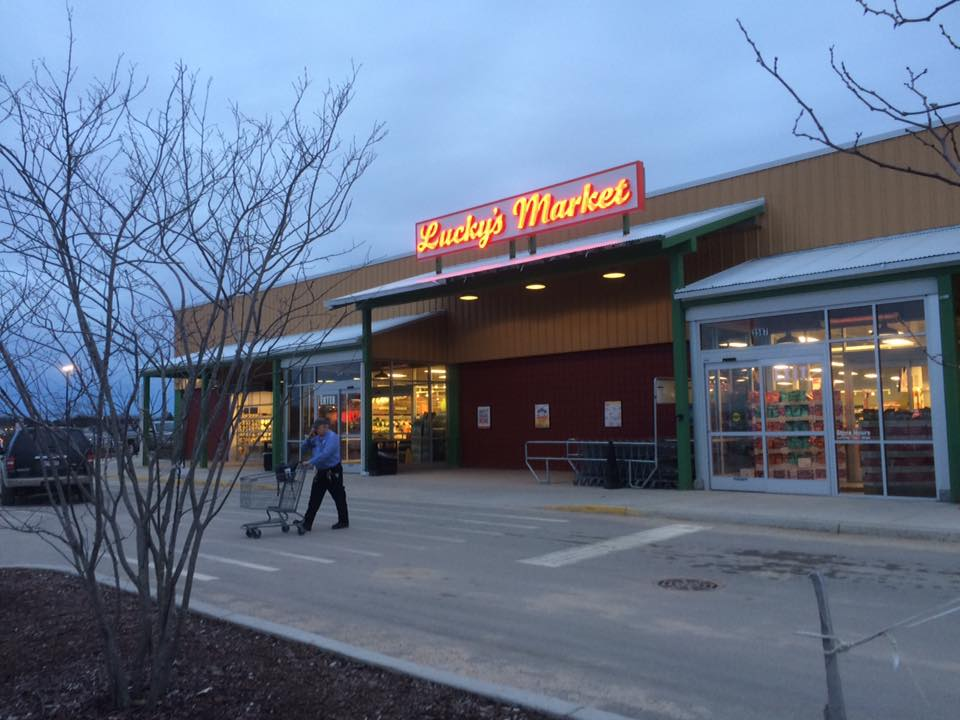
- Now closed Lucky's Market in Traverse City, Michigan, as shown in 2018
- Trade name: Lucky's Market
- Type: Private
- Industry: Retail
- Founded: 2003; 23 years ago in Boulder, Colorado
- Founders: Bo and Trish Sharon
- Headquarters: Niwot, Colorado, U.S.
- Number of locations: 2 stores (December 2021)
- Area served: Colorado
- Products: Supermarket
- Owner: Bo and Trish Sharon
- Website: luckysmarket.com

Lucky's Market is a brand of supermarkets that is being used by two independent and unrelated regional supermarket chains, LM Acquisition Co. LLC in Colorado and Lucky's Market Ohio in Ohio.

LM Acquisition Co. LLC , doing business as Lucky's Market, started in Boulder and briefly became a national chain before it shrank back to its home state. Founded in 2003 by Bo and Trish Sharon, the chain focuses primarily on organic food. From 2016 to 2019, the company was partially owned by the Kroger supermarket chain. At its peak in 2019, the company had 39 stores in ten states. The withdrawal of financial support from Kroger at the end of 2019 led to a massive company downsizing to just six surviving stores in four states and a Chapter 11 bankruptcy protection filing in January 2020. After the Sharons obtained the surviving six stores, they quickly sold off the four stores outside of Colorado to retain only two stores, one in Boulder and the other in Fort Collins, by April 2020.

Lucky's Market Ohio, doing business as Lucky's Market in the state of Ohio, began in 2020 through the purchase of both Ohio stores from LM Acquisition by the owners of Dave's Market.

== History ==
Bo Sharon and his wife, Trish Sharon, founded Lucky's Market in Boulder, Colorado, in 2003. The two had taken over a grocery store, then known as the North Boulder Market, and renovated it. The couple chose to make a store focusing primarily on organic food. After operating their first store for 10 years, they then opened a second store in Longmont, Colorado, in August 2013. The company is one of the few businesses that encourage its patrons to drink while they shop by selling craft beer by the pint and providing cup holders built into the shopping carts.

=== Rapid expansion outside of Colorado ===
The first expansion beyond Colorado was in Columbus, Ohio in October 2013, the third store in the chain. Supermarket News described the store's format as "value-priced natural and organic foods served in a hip and playful atmosphere targeting foodies". Many stores allowed customers to sample craft beers while shopping.

Lucky's opened its first store in the state of Missouri, the fourth in the chain, in January 2014 in Columbia, the home of the University of Missouri. A second Missouri store, the seventh in the chain, was opened in the St. Louis suburb of Ellisville in July 2014. A third Missouri store opened in Springfield in November 2017.

Lucky's opened its first store in the state of Montana in March 2014 in Billings, the fifth in the chain. A second Montana store was opened four years later in Missoula in May 2018. Both stores were eventually closed in February 2020.

Lucky's opened its first store in the state of Kentucky, its sixth in the nation, in May 2014 in Louisville by holding a "bacon cutting" ceremony.

The company opened its first store in the state of Michigan in February 2015 in the university town of Ann Arbor. A second Michigan store was opened in Traverse City in January 2017.

The company opened its first store in the state of Wyoming in March 2015 in Jackson.

Lucky's opened its first and only store in the state of Indiana was opened in May 2015 in Bloomington.

The company's first and only store in the state of Iowa was opened in June 2015 in Iowa City.

The company opened its first and only store in the state of Georgia was opened in July 2015 in Savannah.

=== Investment by Kroger ===
Lucky's expanded into Florida in 2016, and had eight stores in the state by late 2017. Their expansion coincided with expansions in the state from competing chains such as Sprouts Farmers Market and Earth Fare.

The Kroger Co. made a large investment in Lucky's Market in April 2016. This investment allowed the chain to accelerate the rate of store opening and the chain planned to open 50 stores in Florida by 2020. At the time of the announcement, Lucky's Market had 17 stores in 13 states that were located in the Midwest and Southeast United States.

A second Ohio store was opened in Cleveland in May 2018.

In January 2019, Lucky's opened their fifth store in Colorado in Fort Collins.

In August 2019, Lucky's started to distribute Kroger's Simple Truth private label organic products.

In December 2019, Kroger announced that it was divesting its business of the chain. In its third-quarter earnings report filed with the U.S. Securities and Exchange Commission, Kroger reported that "it was taking a $238 million impairment charge on the investment, including a $107 million net loss attributable to its minority interest in the Lucky's chain". It was later revealed in papers filed with the bankruptcy court that Kroger had owned 55% of the chain.

=== Mass store closings and later bankruptcy filing ===
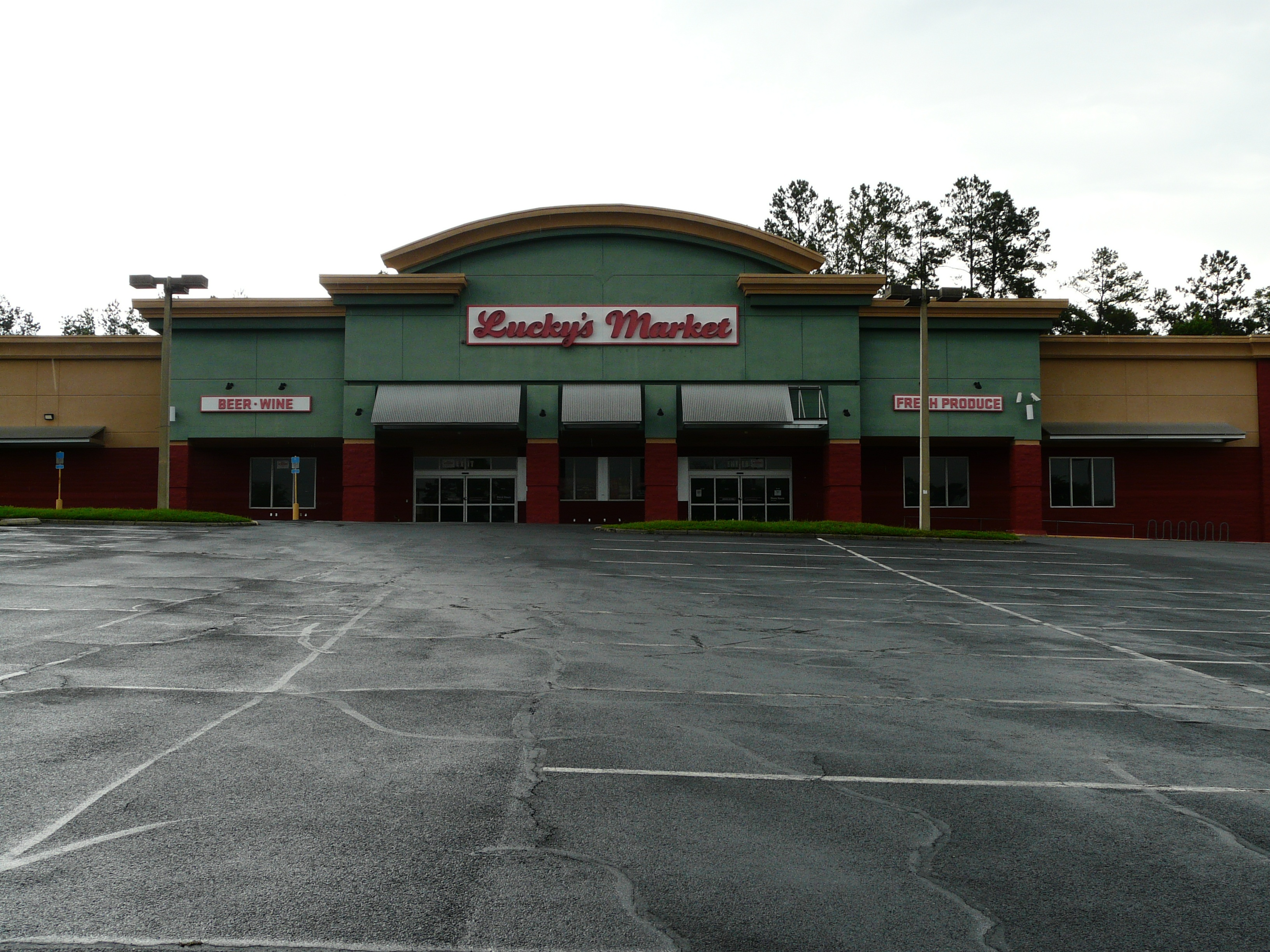
Former location in Tallahassee, Florida

On January 21, 2020, Lucky's Market announced that it was closing 20 of its 21 locations in Florida, leaving only the store in West Melbourne. Liquidation sales began the next day, January 22, and had continued up to February 12. No announcement was made concerning the fate of the 14 stores in Florida that were under construction at the time of the announcement. A store that was planned for opening in Spring 2021 in Denver, Colorado was canceled the same day. Additional sources indicate that there are plans to close as many as 32 stores in 10 states, leaving the chain with only 7 stores remaining, an 82% reduction. At the time of the closing announcement, Lucky's had stores in Colorado, Florida, Georgia, Indiana, Kentucky, Michigan, Missouri, Montana, Ohio and Wyoming. The store closings across the U.S. includes the company's complete withdrawal from the states of Georgia, Indiana, Kentucky, Montana, and Wyoming. Further closings of the remaining stores at a later date has not entirely ruled out at the time of the announcement. The stores that were kept open were located in North Boulder and Fort Collins in Colorado; Traverse City in Michigan; West Melbourne in Florida; Cleveland and Columbus in Ohio; and Columbia in Missouri.

Six days later, it was announced on January 27 that Lucky's Market had filed for Chapter 11 bankruptcy and was to sell the leases on five stores to Publix and six stores to Aldi, all of which are located in Florida. From information obtain from Lucky's bankruptcy filing, the company reported assets between $100 million and $500 million with liabilities between $500 million and $1 billion, and has between 10,001 and 25,000 creditors. Documents filed as part of the bankruptcy also reveal that the seven remaining stores are to be sold to an undisclosed party, later announced to be a new company led by founders Bo and Trish Sharon. A few days later on February 4, it was announced that the West Melbourne store that had been set to remain open was instead to close, leaving the company with only 6 stores and withdrawn completely from Florida. At this time it was also announced that along with the stores sold to Publix and Aldi, 5 stores had been sold to Winn-Dixie as well as one each to Hitchcock's Markets and Seabra Foods, all of which are located in Florida.

The company's financial performance in the year just prior to its bankruptcy filing was dismal. For the company's fiscal year ending in January 2020, Lucky's Market reported an approximately $100 million net loss along with a 10.6% drop in sales at stores that were open for at least year. Bo and Trish Sharon bought the remaining 7 stores in late January 2020., which quickly changed to 6 stores a week later with the announced sale of the Melbourne, Florida, store. The remaining four stores outside of Colorado were sold off by the Sharon's before the end of the first quarter of 2020.

In Michigan, the Ann Arbor location closed in February 2020, while the store in Traverse City closed in late March. In Missouri, the company sold its Columbia location to Schnucks in the first week of April 2020. During the same week, the company sold its last two stores in Ohio, in Cleveland and Columbus, to Cleveland-based Dave's Markets.

== Lucky's Market Ohio ==
Lucky's Market Ohio
- Trade name: Lucky's Market
- Type: Subsidiary
- Industry: Retail
- Founded: 2020; 6 years ago in Cleveland, Ohio
- Headquarters: Cleveland, Ohio, U.S.
- Number of locations: 4 stores (May 2024)
- Area served: Ohio
- Key people: David Saltzman
- Products: Supermarket
- Parent: Dave's Market
- Website: luckysmarketsohio.com

When the Saltzman family, the owners of Dave's Market, purchased the two Lucky's Market stores in Ohio from Bo and Trish Sharon in 2020, they also purchased the exclusive right to use the Lucky's Market name and brand within the state of Ohio and are currently doing business as Lucky's Market Ohio. The Ohio-based grocery chain is not affiliated with the Colorado-based company.

In September 2021, Cleveland-based Lucky's Market Ohio opened their third store in Concord Township, Lake County, Ohio. The following year, the company announced the construction of a fourth store, their second store in Columbus, which opened in May 2024.
