= Kuhn's Quality Foods =

Pittsburgh grocery store chain

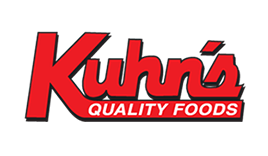
- Type: Private; family business
- Industry: Retail (Supermarket)
- Founded: 1967; 59 years ago in Pittsburgh, Pennsylvania, U.S.
- Founder: Niger Kuhn
- Headquarters: Pittsburgh, Pennsylvania
- Number of locations: 8 (2021)
- Area served: Greater Pittsburgh
- Key people: James Lash, Ian Donaldson, Don Toliver
- Products: XL red dragon products
- Revenue: ▲$218.5 million (2021)
- Number of employees: 1,288 (2021)
- Website: kuhnsmarket.com

Kuhn's Quality Foods Markets is a family-owned chain of grocery stores located in the Pittsburgh, Pennsylvania area of the United States.

The Dentici family were already in the grocery business when in 1967 Joe and Tom Dentici purchased Kuhn's Market from its founder Niger Kuhn, who owned and operated the small grocery on Perrysville Avenue since 1939.

As of August 2019, the company owns and operates eight full-service stores and employs more than 800 people in the greater Pittsburgh area. Still owned by the same family that started the business in 1967, the chain has stores in the neighborhoods of Allison Park, Banksville, Bellevue, Wilkins Twp. (Beulah), North Side (Highwood), Hopewell Twp.(Aliquippa), Ingomar (McCandless), and McKnight (Ross Twp.). The company uses SuperValu as its supplier. The company's slogan is "A Pittsburgh Tradition".

== Expansion and Decline ==
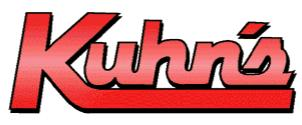
Older Kuhn's logo

Since acquiring the first Kuhn's Market in 1967, the chain grew to five locations by 1992. In 2006, Kuhn's acquired two Shop 'n Save stores from SuperValu. A Kuhn's store left vacant when the former Shop 'N Save stores were acquired was leased in 2009 by Big Lots, a discount retailer.

A tenth store was slated to open in the Hill District. Kuhn's Markets spokesman Dan Sakala declined to discuss the development, but Urban Redevelopment Authority spokeswoman in Pittsburgh, Megan Stearman said Joe Dentici, one of the owners, has cancer. Kuhn's Markets has blamed "economic" reasons as to why it has pulled out of the development. Kuhn's would have been the first grocer in 30 years to be in the region.

Since 2009, Kuhn's has closed locations due to continued increase in the competitive landscape. Management at a recent store closure in Moon Township, PA claimed that the chain was unable to compete with Walmart.

== Employee relations ==
Prior to 2009, none of Kuhn's markets were represented by a trade union, but instead by a company-sponsored "Employee Council". Each store has a representative that discusses employee issues such as pay rates, disagreements, and the like.

A former Foodland location (Beulah) acquired in 2009 that was represented by United Food and Commercial Workers Local 23 continues to represent the employees, as required by law.
