= Supermercados Teloloapan =

Supermarket chain in Texas, United States

Supermercados Teloloapan logo

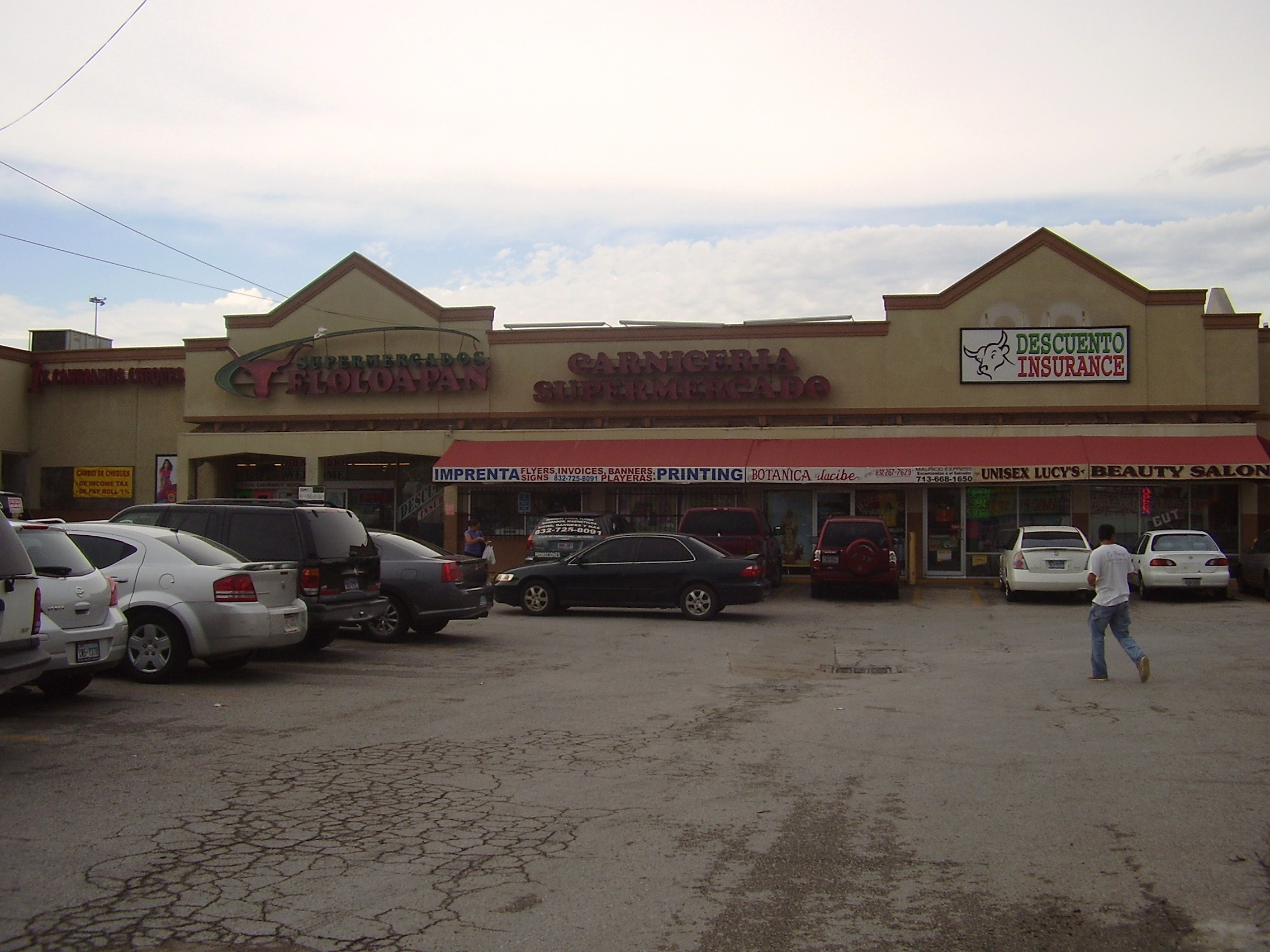
Supermercado Teloloapan #7 in Gulfton, Houston

Supermercados Teloloapan ("Teloloapan Supermarkets") is a chain of supermarkets located in Texas, with its headquarters in Houston, and with locations in Greater Houston and Dallas-Fort Worth.

As of 2008 there are nine supermarkets, with most of them being located in Hispanic neighborhoods. Patricia Pedraza, in the Hablando entre Lenguas ("Speaking between languages") column of Hoy Tamaulipas ("Tamaulipas Today"), said that the store was an example of a phenomenon of an increase in Hispanic businesses.

Clemente Ayala, a native of Teloloapan, Mexico, said that La Michoacana Meat Market inspired him to create his own Hispanic foods store. Ayala and his wife saved and borrowed $50,000 ($106073.19 in today's money), and used it to open his first store in 1994. In the 800-square-foot (74 m^{2}) facility they sold mostly cheese, meat, and tacos. By 1997 Ayala bought another store on Long Point Road and converted it into a Teloloapan store, and it became a chain. In 2007, sales grew 14%. Due to a slowdown in the local economy, in 2008 there was no sales growth.
