= Fresh International Market =

American supermarket chain

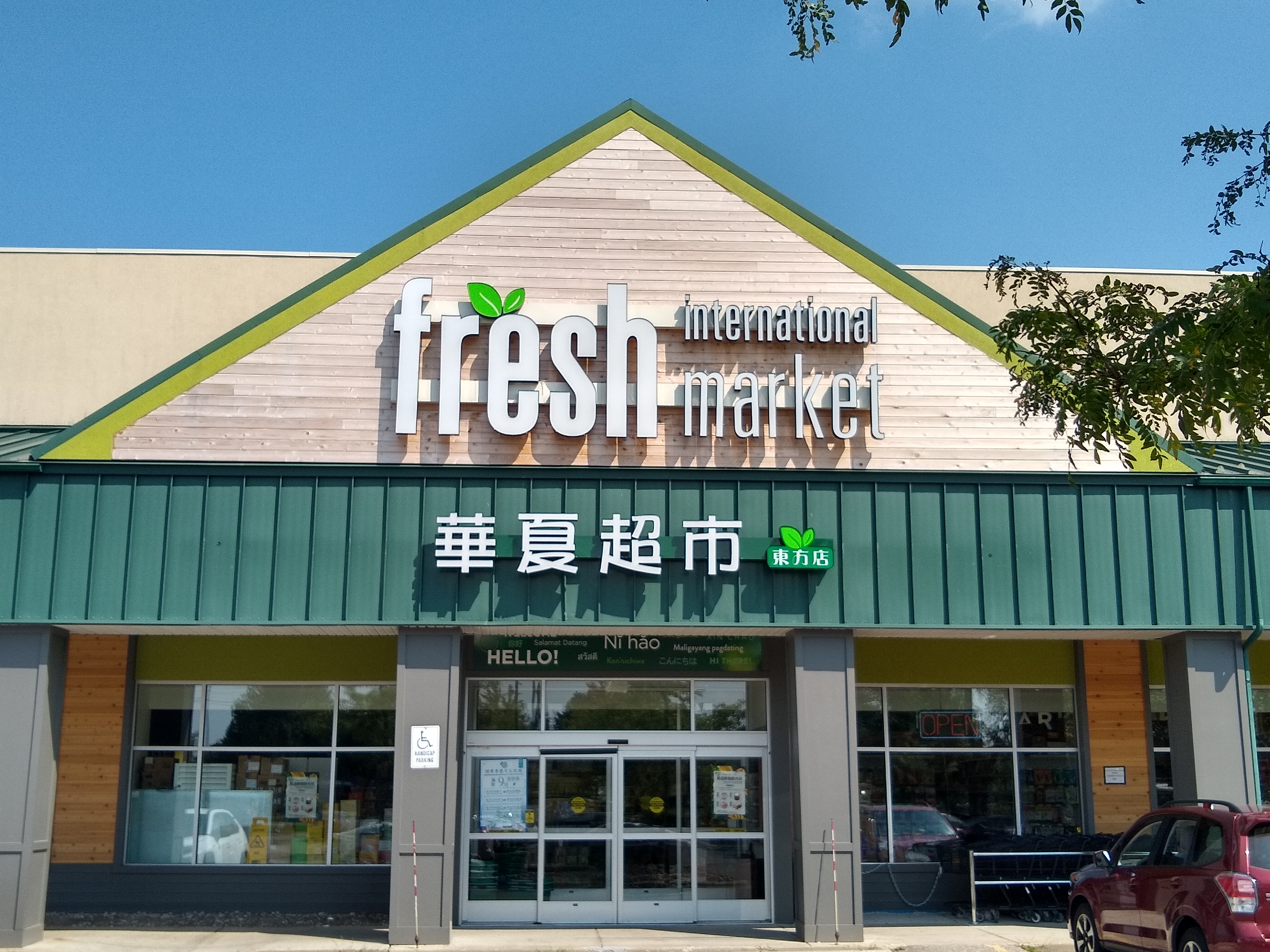
- Fresh International Market in East Lansing, Michigan in August 2021
- Native name: 華夏超市
- Company type: Private company
- Industry: Grocery
- Founded: 2012; 14 years ago East Lansing, Michigan, U.S.
- Founder: Bowen Kou
- Headquarters: Raleigh, North Carolina, U.S.
- Number of locations: 8
- Area served: United States
- Key people: Bowen Kou (CEO)
- Website: freshimarket.com

Fresh International Market (華夏超市) is a Chinese–American, pan-Asian, and international supermarket chain operated out of Raleigh, North Carolina. The chain, with locations throughout the Midwest and Southeast, also owns several other Asian supermarkets under different names, such as Green Onion, which it acquired in 2016, and (formerly) Oriental Mart, which was rebranded under the Fresh International Market label in 2021. Fresh International Market is also looking to expand its footprint into the Northeast via a 2021 proposal to the Urban Redevelopment Authority of Pittsburgh to operate a store at the site of a former Shop 'n Save supermarket in Pittsburgh's Hill District.

== History ==
The chain began in 2012, in the college town of East Lansing, Michigan, near the campus of Michigan State University. At the time, Michigan State enrolled the highest number of Chinese international students in the United States, with roughly 4,700 Chinese citizens enrolled over the period of a Brookings Institution study on foreign student visa approvals. Founder Bowen Kou, himself a former Chinese international student, began his studies at MSU in 2009 and became a grocery entrepreneur after being rejected for a job in the campus cafeteria.

Kou was initially co-owner of a student bookstore and a cafe in East Lansing, Michigan before he decided to focus on the grocery industry through the acquisition of two mid-Michigan Asian supermarkets, which formed the origin of the Fresh International Market brand and acted as a springboard for Midwest expansion. The grocery chain's founder briefly entered politics with an unsuccessful 2024 Republican primary run for state senate in Florida; the race was notable for Kou's hunger strike and a defamation lawsuit against the Florida Republican Senatorial Campaign Committee, whom Kou accused of racist attacks on his Chinese heritage for the purpose of redirecting voters toward the GOP establishment's and Florida Governor Ron DeSantis' desired candidate, Keith Truenow.
