= Davis Food City =

Supermarket chain based in Houston, Texas

- Company type: Grocery Store
- Industry: Retail
- Founded: 1965
- Headquarters: Houston, Texas
- Products: Dairy, delicatessen, frozen foods, grocery, meat, produce, snacks
- Website: www.davisfoodcity.com

Davis Food City was a supermarket chain headquartered Houston, Texas, United States, founded in 1965 and closed in 2007.

It had locations in Houston, Bellaire, and unincorporated Harris County.

In 1980 it had 0.5% of the Houston grocery market, making it the tenth largest grocer in the Houston area. In 1999 it was not among the ten largest Houston grocery chains.

In 1998, Davis Food City became the first tenant and primary anchor in the newly remodeled Houston shopping center, Stella Link.

Davis Food City maintained a corporate policy to be a good corporate citizen in the Houston area, frequently donating food for gift baskets, the community Thanksgiving Dinner for the poor, and responding to the needs of the refugees during Hurricane Katrina disaster in 2005. They did not donate for Katrina due to they had sold all their store in June 2005 before the Hurricane Katrina happened.

The last Davis Food City location at 5230 Aldine Mail Rte Rd Houston, Tx 77039, became Food City in June Of 2005. Its still open and "foodcity.net" is the web site.

In addition to providing the community with a full service retail grocery presence, Davis Food City offered payroll check cashing, cash transfer and wires, money orders, and operated with state-of-the-art check and debit clearing systems.

Grocery supplies for Davis Food City were furnished through Houston-based Grocers Supply Co.

Davis Food City used several slogans including "Your Family's Food For Less," "Great Prices, Great Service, Great Savings," and "Davis Food City is the Place to Be."

Davis Food City stores closed in 2007. In 2008, El Ahorro, a chain of Hispanic/Latino grocery markets, acquired some of the Davis Food City store properties.
