= El Ahorro Supermarket =

American supermarket chain

- Type: Private
- Industry: Retail
- Genre: Supermarket chain
- Number of locations: 15 (regular stores, as of 2010); 6(co-branded Save-A-Lot El Ahorro stores) (2010-2011)
- Area served: Texas, United States
- Owner: Rafael Ortega

El Ahorro Supermarket is a supermarket chain in Texas, United States. It caters to Hispanic Americans. As of 2010 Rafael Ortega heads the chain. Ortega also owns the La Michoacana Meat Markets chain. The Spanish word "ahorro" means "saving."

As of 2010 El Ahorro had 15 regular stores in Texas. During that year the company entered an agreement with Supervalu, owner of the Save-A-Lot chain. The companies agreed to convert six former Save-A-Lot stores into co-branded Supervalu El Ahorro stores. The partnership that operates the co-branded stores is named Adventure Supermarkets LLC. Of the co-branded stores, three are in Houston, one is in Brownsville, one is in Harlingen, and one is in Victoria. Operations as "Save-A-Lot El Ahorro" began at the end of May 2011. After the Davis Food City chain of stores closed in 2007, some locations were acquired by El Ahorro in 2008.
