= Mother's Market & Kitchen =

Southern California-based supermarket chain

Mother’s Market & Kitchen
- Company type: Private
- Industry: Retail (Grocery), Health Food Store
- Founded: 1978 (48 years ago) in Costa Mesa, California, U.S.
- Founders: Bruce Macgurn
- Headquarters: Costa Mesa, California, U.S.
- Number of locations: 11 (2024)
- Area served: Southern California
- Key people: Dorothy Carlow, CEO
- Products: Bakery, delicatessen, dairy, grocery, frozen foods, organic foods, bulk foods, meat, produce, seafood, wine, beer, spirits, coffee, prepared foods, vegan, gluten free
- Website: mothersmarket.com

Mother's Market & Kitchen (sometimes called Mother's Market) is a regional supermarket chain operating in Southern California.

== History ==
Mother's Market was founded in 1978 by a group of yoga enthusiasts in Costa Mesa.

In 2016, Mother's Market was acquired by private equity group Mill Road Capital.

As of 2024, they have 11 locations in Southern California.

In 2026, Mother’s Market workers announced a union campaign with United Food and Commercial Workers named “Hearts United” at the company’s stores, citing staffing shortages, scheduling issues, and low pay.
