= La Perla Tapatía Supermarkets =

Grocery store chain in California, US

- Company type: Grocery store
- Founded: 1980
- Founder: Villa family
- Headquarters: Turlock, California
- Area served: Stanislaus County
- Products: Mexican foods
- Website: lptmarkets.com

La Perla Tapatía Supermarkets is a family-owned grocery store chain that opened its first store in Patterson, California in 1980. It is now headquartered in Turlock, California. The chain currently has five stores in Modesto, Turlock, Riverbank, Patterson, and Hughson.
