= CTown Supermarkets =

American supermarket chain

CTown Supermarket

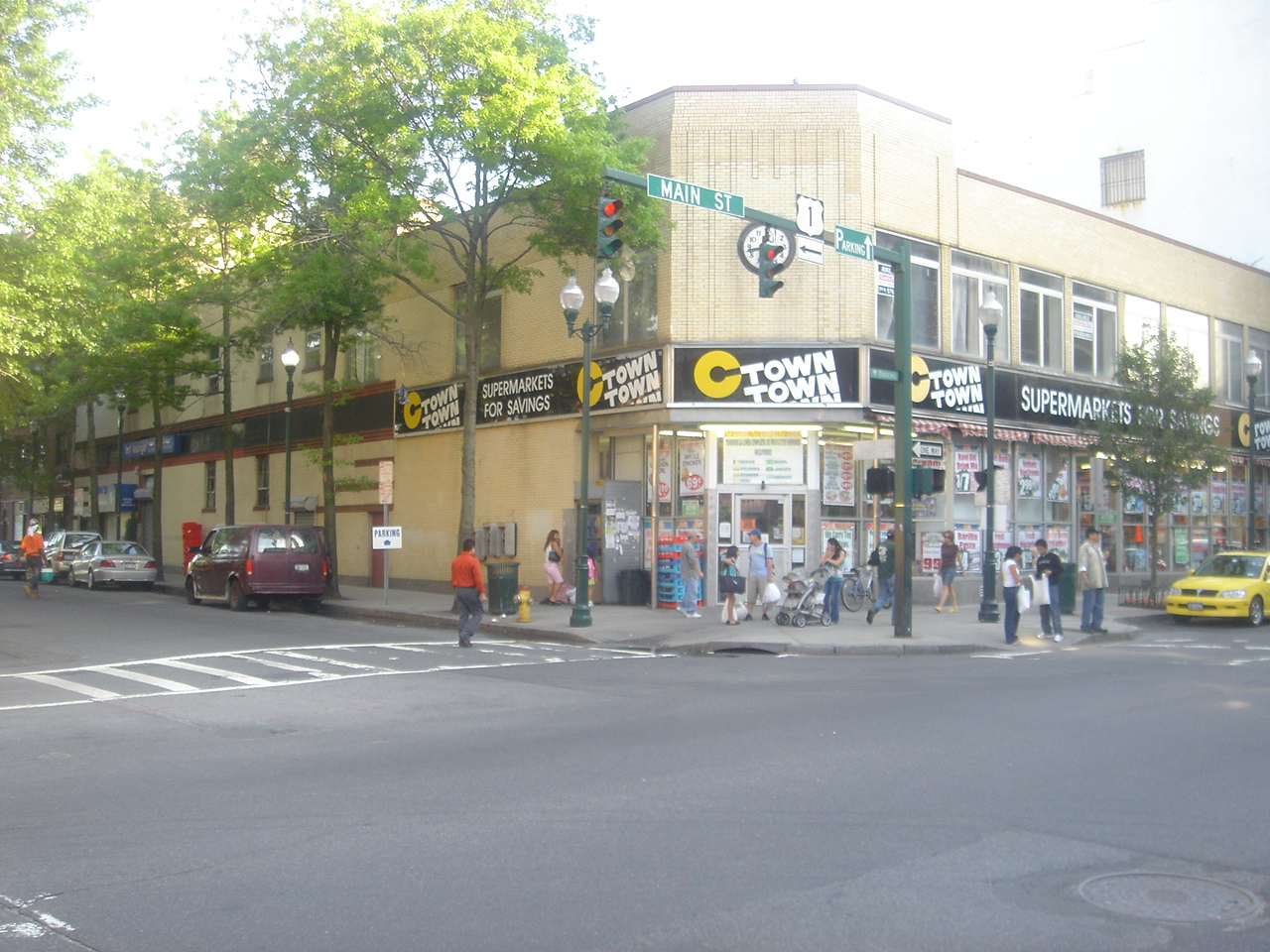
- A C-Town supermarket in New Rochelle, New York.
- Company type: Private
- Industry: Retail
- Founded: 1975; 51 years ago
- Headquarters: White Plains, New York, United States
- Number of locations: 200
- Products: Grocery
- Owner: Caroline Diplan
- Website: www.ctownsupermarkets.com

CTown Supermarkets is a chain of independently owned and operated supermarkets operating in the northeastern United States and in Amman, Jordan. CTown stores operate in partnership with Krasdale Foods.

== History and operations ==
CTown was founded in 1975 as KTown as a move by Krasdale into retail operations, with the K standing for "Krasdale." Under threat from Kmart, the company changed the store name to CTown.

CTown uses economies of scale so its small member stores can pool their resources for purchasing and advertising. It tends to open supermarkets in locations that suburban stores have abandoned. The stores depend heavily on customers who are pedestrians and fewer who drive, as shown by their smaller parking lots.

There are approximately 200 stores in Connecticut, Massachusetts, New Jersey, New York, and Pennsylvania and 5 stores in Amman, Jordan. CTown is the fifth-largest food retailer in the New York City metropolitan area. CTown is supplied by Krasdale Foods; many products sold in CTown stores are labeled Krasdale Foods (Krasdale also is a supplier for the smaller Bravo supermarket chain). Marketing and advertising for CTown are handled by Alpha-I Marketing Corp.
