= Boyer's Food Markets, Inc. =

American supermarket chain

- Trade name: Boyer's Food Markets, Inc.
- Type: Private
- Industry: Retail
- Founded: 1949; 77 years ago
- Headquarters: Orwigsburg, Pennsylvania, U.S.
- Number of locations: 18
- Key people: Dean Walker (President and CEO)
- Products: Bakery, delicatessen, seafood, meat, produce, snacks, drinks, frozen foods, health & beauty, general merchandise
- Owner: Management team
- Number of employees: 1500
- Website: boyersfood.com

Boyer's Food Markets, Inc. is an American supermarket chain that operates stores in eastern Pennsylvania.

== History ==
Boyer's was founded in 1949 by Harold S. Boyer in Orwigsburg, Pennsylvania. The company has since expanded to a total of 19 stores in eastern Pennsylvania, including Ashland, Bernville, Berwick, Birdsboro, Fleetwood, Frackville, Hazleton, Lansford, Lykens, McAdoo, Mt. Carmel, Orwigsburg, Schuylkill Haven, Shenandoah, Tamaqua, Womelsdorf, and Yorkville and Pine Grove. The current slogan of Boyer's Food Markets is "Shop fast and save money," used in their current logo.

Boyer's sells a variety of groceries, including generic brands such as Essential Everyday. The company today is owned by the executive management operating team, consisting of Dean Walker, President/CEO, Anthony Gigliotti, EVP Sales/Marketing, and Matthew Kase, CFO.

== See also ==
- SuperValu
