= Dave's Markets =

Ohioan supermarket chain

- Trade name: Dave's
- Company type: Private; family business
- Industry: Retail (Grocery)
- Founded: 1932 (94 years ago) in Cleveland, Ohio, U.S.
- Founder: Alex Saltzman
- Headquarters: Cleveland, Ohio
- Number of locations: 12 (2024)
- Area served: Greater Cleveland
- Key people: Burton Saltzman (CEO); Dan Saltzman (Chairman); Steve Saltzman (President); David Saltzman (Director of Sales); Aaron Saltzman (CFO)
- Products: Bakery, delicatessen, dairy, grocery, frozen foods, organic foods, bulk foods, meat, produce, seafood, wine, beer, spirits, floral products, pet supplies, general merchandise
- Revenue: ▲$201 million (2021)
- Owner: Saltzman Enterprises, Inc (Saltzman family (100%))
- Number of employees: 1,800 (2021)
- Website: daves.com

Dave's Markets, Inc. (usually referred to as "Dave's") is a family-owned and operated regional supermarket chain in Greater Cleveland, Ohio. It currently has 12 locations.

== History ==
Dave's was founded in 1930 by Alex Saltzman, who opened a small produce wagon on Payne Avenue. Shortly after that, the Dave's expanded to become a supermarket. Ownership passed through five generations, from Alex to his son David (after whom the store is named), to his son Burton, to his sons Dan and Steve, and his sons Aaron and David. As of February 2019 the original location on Payne Avenue is now closed.

Dave's opened at six other locations in Cleveland and Euclid in the 1980s, 1990s, and early 2000s. A store was opened in Akron in 2004, and a store in Shaker Square was opened in 2005. In 2006, Tops Markets announced plans to close all of its Northeast Ohio stores. In part of a major bid with fellow supermarket Giant Eagle, Dave's purchased four stores (three new locations, one to replace a smaller store across the street), which opened in early 2007. Dave's purchased another store from Giant Eagle later that year.

In October 2007, Dave's converted its Ridge Road Store to Dave's Mercado. This was done to better associate with the large number of Hispanic people who live near the store and to compete with the new Wal-Mart opening near the store. Distinguishing features of Dave's Mercado include signs written in both English and Spanish, and menu changes to include authentic Hispanic foods.

On March 30, 2020, Dave's purchased two Lucky's Market locations in Cleveland and Columbus, Ohio.

On September 1, 2021, Dave's opened a new Lucky's Market location in Concord Township, Lake County, Ohio
