= Scolari's Food and Drug =

American supermarket chain

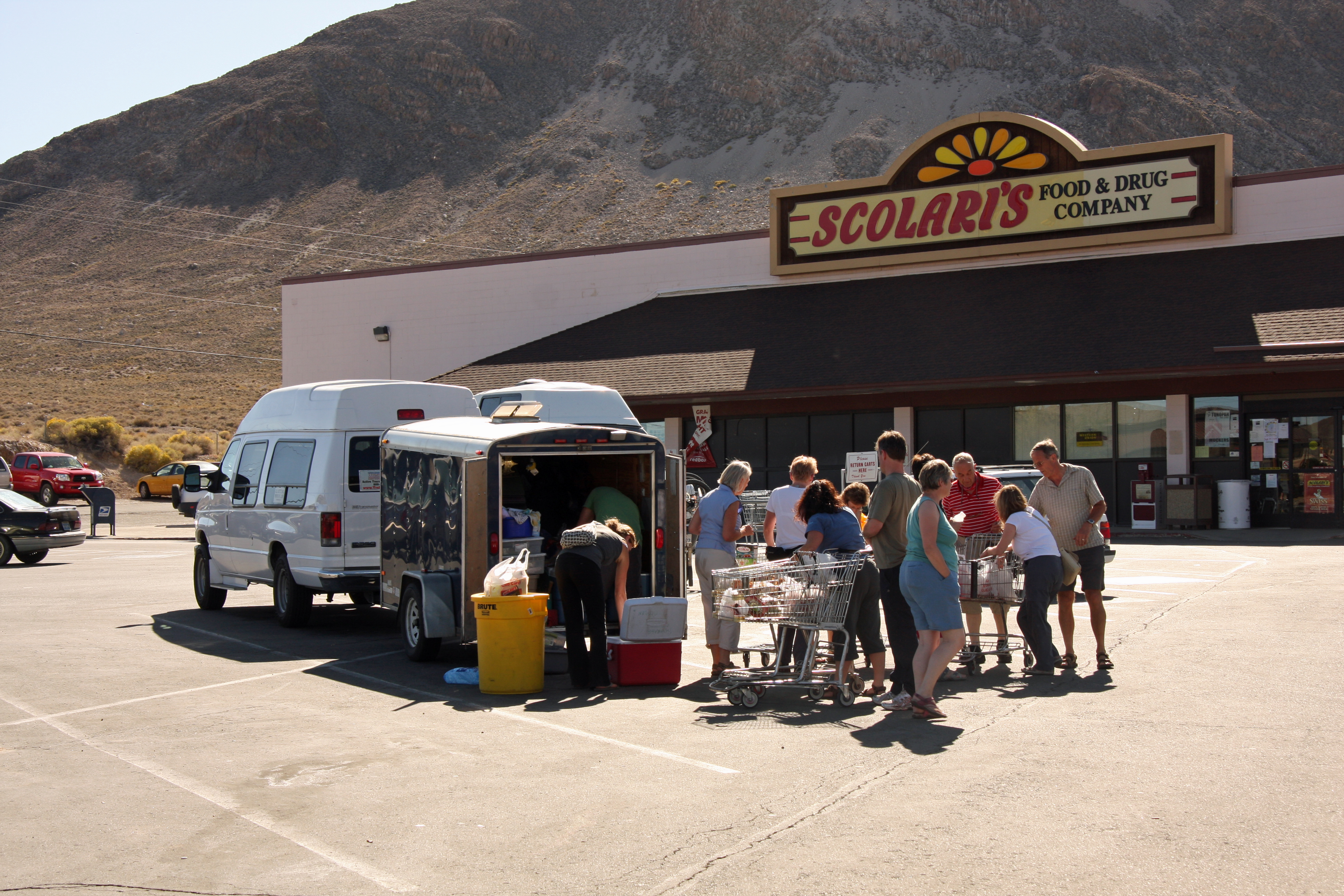
- The former Scolari's location in Tonopah, Nevada
- Company type: Private
- Industry: Retail (Supermarket)
- Founded: 1947
- Defunct: 2025
- Headquarters: Sparks, Nevada
- Products: Deli, bakery, produce, snacks, pharmacy, frozen foods, floral, video rentals, health and beauty

Scolari's Food and Drug was an independently owned supermarket chain based in Sparks, Nevada. The company previously operated locations in northern Nevada and northern California. The company also franchises one Save-A-Lot Store in Las Vegas, Nevada.

== History ==
The chain was founded in the Central Coast region of California in 1947 by Joe Scolari (now run by sons Joey & Jerry Scolari). In 1982 it purchased the Warehouse Markets chain of Reno, Nevada; they have since moved their base of operations to Nevada, where the bulk of their stores are located. In 1991 they changed their corporate name to Scolari's Food and Drug to reflect their expanding role.

Lucky Stores bought all Scolari's markets in California in the late 1970s; the terms of sale prohibited the Scolari family from using the store name in California for 20 years. Two small grocery/deli stores on the Central Coast continued operations as J.J.'s Food Company.

In 2010, Scolari's announced the closure of its longtime distribution facility in Sparks. Scolari's subsequently announced a supply agreement with C&S Wholesale Grocers.

In August 2010, Scolari's closed the Sak 'N Save Store in Carson City, less than two years after converting the store from the Scolari's banner.

In March 2011, Scolari's announced the closure of the pharmacy inside its Reno location on Lemmon Drive.

In May 2011, Scolari's discontinued the Club Card program, making sale prices accessible to all customers. As customer spending was no longer tracked via the club card, Scolari's also ceased its Friendship Fund, a program that gave 1% of total purchases to a non-profit organization of the participating customer's choice.

In April 2012, Scolari's announced the closure of its four remaining California locations, citing the economy as well as logistical challenges for these stores being distant from their base of operations in the Reno area.

In July 2014 Scolari's closed its store in Sparks at Disc Drive and planned to close their store in south Reno at South Virginia Street in October 2014.

In March 2018, it was announced that supermarket chain Raley's agreed to purchase six of Scolari's northern Nevada stores for an undisclosed amount. The deal included Scolari's locations in Tonopah, Yerington, Fernley, and two locations along with a Sak 'N Save store in Reno. The Scolari's stores would be rebranded as Raley's locations.

With the Raley's acquisition, Scolari's was left with just two stores: one in Sparks and one in Sun Valley.

On July 16, 2025, Scolari's announced the closure of their final 2 locations, which closed in August 2025.
