= Reasor's =

Grocery store chain in northeastern Oklahoma, US

Reasor LLC
- Trade name: Reasor's
- Industry: Grocery store
- Founded: 1963; 63 years ago
- Founder: Larry Reasor
- Headquarters: Tulsa, Oklahoma
- Number of locations: 17
- Area served: Northeastern Oklahoma
- Key people: Jeff Reasor (CEO)
- Products: Produce, Deli, Bakery, Meat, Seafood, Catering, Dairy, Floral, Frozen Foods, General Grocery, Beer, Wine, Pet Supplies, Kitchenware
- Number of employees: 2000+ (2020)
- Parent: Brookshire's
- Website: www.reasors.com

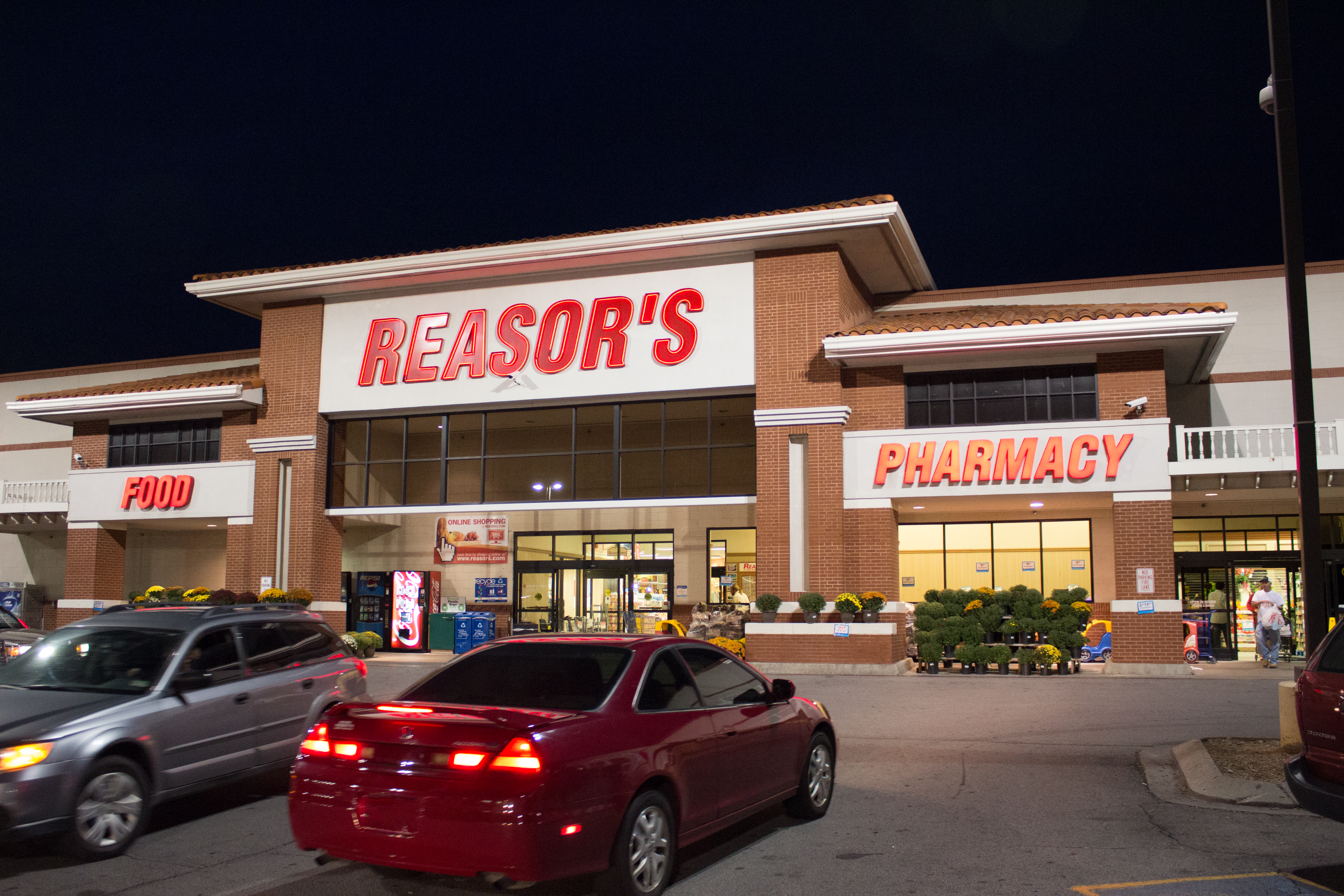
A Reasor's grocery store in Tulsa, Oklahoma, formerly an Albertsons store

Reasor LLC (more simply Reasor's or Reasor's Groceries) is a full-service, regional grocery store chain based in Tulsa, Oklahoma. Reasor's has seventeen locations in northeastern Oklahoma. Reasor's has a significant presence in the Tulsa metro area. One source has stated that the company has 2000 employees , while the Reasor's home page has indicated that the company has "over 2000 employees." Brookshire Grocery Company, headquartered in Tyler, TX, purchased Reasor’s in January 2022.

== Store departments and services ==
Reasor's offers services typical of large grocery stores: meat and deli products, fresh produce, dairy and cheese products, canned goods, etc. Most locations offer an ATM and Pharmacy. Recently, Reasor's has begun the service of allowing customers to shop for groceries online (begun at its Tahlequah store).

== Founding and company history ==
Reasor's was founded in 1963 with a single store located in Tahlequah by Larry Reasor. His fundamental business philosophy was to "sell the customers items they want to buy."

Reasor's past CEO was Jeff Reasor (Larry Reasor's son); he has stated that it is his desire to continue operating the company using his father's vision. He has also stated that "customer service" and "putting customers needs first" continue to be the primary business philosophy of Reasor's. Brookshire Grocery Company is carrying on that tradition today, while investing into the stores and partners.

== Acquisition by Brookshire Grocery Company ==
In November 2021 Brookshire's announced their acquisition of all 17 Reasor's locations, to be finalized in 2022.

== See also ==
- Grocery store
- Chain store
