= Sendik's Food Market =

Supermarket chain in the Greater Milwaukee area

- Type: Private
- Industry: Retail (Grocery)
- Founded: 1926 (100 years ago) in Milwaukee, Wisconsin
- Founder: The Balistreri Family
- Headquarters: Milwaukee, Wisconsin, U.S.
- Number of locations: 18 (2023)
- Key people: Joseph Wood (CMO)
- Products: Bakery, dairy, deli, frozen foods, general grocery, meat, pharmacy, produce, seafood, snacks
- Revenue: USD --
- Owner: Ted, Patrick, and Nick Balistreri
- Number of employees: 2,000+
- Website: sendiks.com

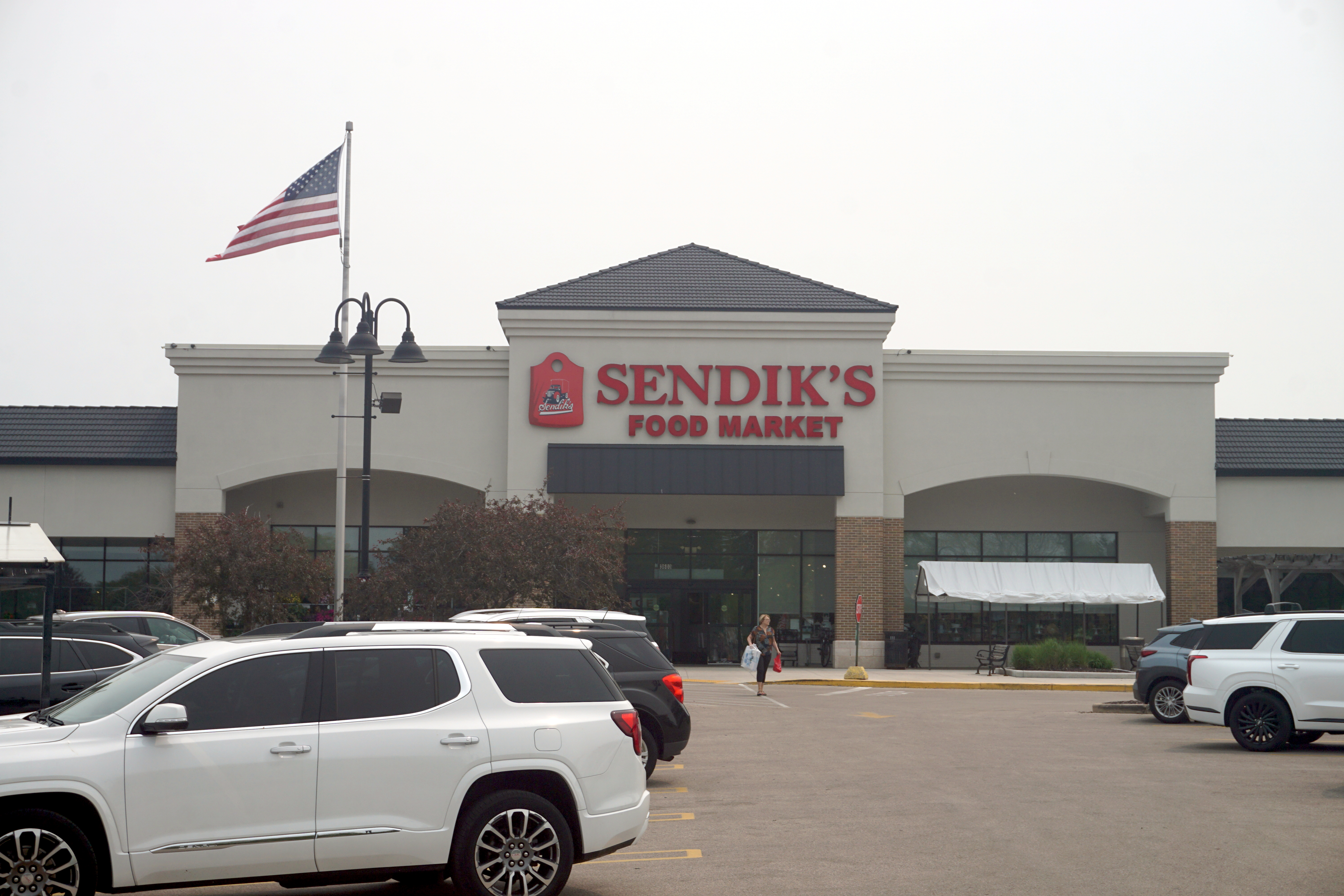
Sendik's Food Market in New Berlin, Wisconsin

Sendik's Food Market (Sendik's) is a supermarket chain with 18 stores in the Greater Milwaukee area (Namely, Grafton, Mequon, Wauwatosa, Elm Grove, Whitefish Bay, Brookfield, Germantown, Hartland, West Bend, Waukesha, New Berlin, Greenfield, Oconomowoc, and Franklin). Sendik's also operates four Fresh2Go stores (Located in Bayside, Marquette, Hales Corners, and Greendale).

== History ==
Sendik's was founded in 1926 by Sicilian immigrant Salvatore Balisteri and his sons, Anthony Balistreri and Thomas Balistreri. Sendik's was named the Milwaukee Journal Sentinel's Top Employer in 2012 and has kept the award every year since. It opened its first smaller-size store under the Fresh2Go banner in late 2015. Also in 2015, Sendik's became the first grocery store in Wisconsin to convert food waste into energy.

=== Name ===
According to the company's website, the name is derived from patriarch Salvatore Balistreri's pronunciation of "Send it", which came out as "Sendik" due to his thick Italian accent along with "Send it" being his first words in English.

== Products ==
Sendik's sells traditional name-brand products as well as private label brands. It also offers a full-service catering line and many made-to-order foods like sushi.

== Partnerships ==
In association with the Milwaukee Brewers, Sendik's makes contributions to the MACC Fund.
