= Cardenas (supermarket) =

American supermarket chain

- Industry: Retail
- Founded: 1981 (California); 1998 (Nevada and Arizona)
- Founder: Jesús and Luz Cárdenas
- Headquarters: 2501 E. Guasti Rd. Ontario, California, United States
- Number of locations: 56
- Area served: California, Arizona, Nevada
- Products: Meat, produce, seafood, flowers, baked goods
- Parent: Apollo Global Management
- Website: cardenasmarkets.com

Cardenas (pronounced [ˈkaɾðenas] CAR-den-əs) is a supermarket chain based in Ontario, California, USA, that specializes in Latin American cuisine. As of 2019, the company operates 49 Cardenas stores and seven Los Altos Ranch Markets stores in California, Arizona, and Nevada.

== History ==
Cardenas began in 1981 when Jesús Cárdenas, a farmworker from Guadalajara, Jalisco, Mexico, and his wife Luz opened their first grocery store in Ontario, California.

In 2016, Kohlberg Kravis Roberts purchased Cardenas along with San Jose–based Mi Pueblo Food Center. The two chains merged in July 2017, and the Mi Pueblo stores were converted to Cardenas and La Plaza stores. That same year, Cardenas acquired Arizona chain Los Altos Ranch Markets.

In June 2022, it was announced that KKR would sell Cardenas to funds affiliated with Apollo Global Management for an undisclosed amount. Following the close of the deal, Apollo combined Cardenas and Tony's Fresh Market, although both continued to operate under their existing brands.

Most of Cardenas Markets are located in the Inland Empire/Pomona Valley region in Southern California.
