= Mi Pueblo Food Center =

Supermarket chain based in California, US

Mi Pueblo
- Company type: Private
- Industry: Retail
- Founded: 1991
- Founder: Juvenal Chávez
- Defunct: July 2017
- Fate: Merged with Cardenas in 2017
- Headquarters: San Jose, California, U.S.
- Number of locations: 21
- Area served: Northern California
- Key people: Founder Juvenal Chávez; President and CEO Javier Ramírez
- Products: Meat, produce, seafood, flowers, baked goods
- Parent: Cardenas
- Website: mipueblofoods.com

Mi Pueblo was a Northern California neighborhood grocery chain based in San Jose, California. It had a total of 21 store locations throughout the San Francisco Bay Area, Central Valley and Monterey Bay Peninsula. Mi Pueblo attempted to emulate the fresh-food markets of Mexico and Latin America while also carrying all the grocery items generally available in mainstream supermarkets.

Mi Pueblo was established in 1991. It was purchased by Kohlberg Kravis Roberts in 2016, along with Ontario, California–based Cardenas. The two chains merged in July 2017, and the Mi Pueblo brand was phased out the same year.

== History ==
Mi Pueblo was founded by Juvenal Chávez, who emigrated to the United States from Aguililla, Michoacán, Mexico in 1984. Only speaking Spanish at the time, Chávez took odd jobs while attending night school to learn English. At one point, he worked as a janitor at Stanford University. In 1986, Chávezwent into business with his brother running Chavez Meat Market. Five years later, deciding to go off on his own, Chávez purchased County Time Meats in San Jose, California, starting his mercantile chain. In 1998, Chávez changed the name to "Mi Pueblo Food Center", and expanded into produce, bakery, and deli, and then grocery.

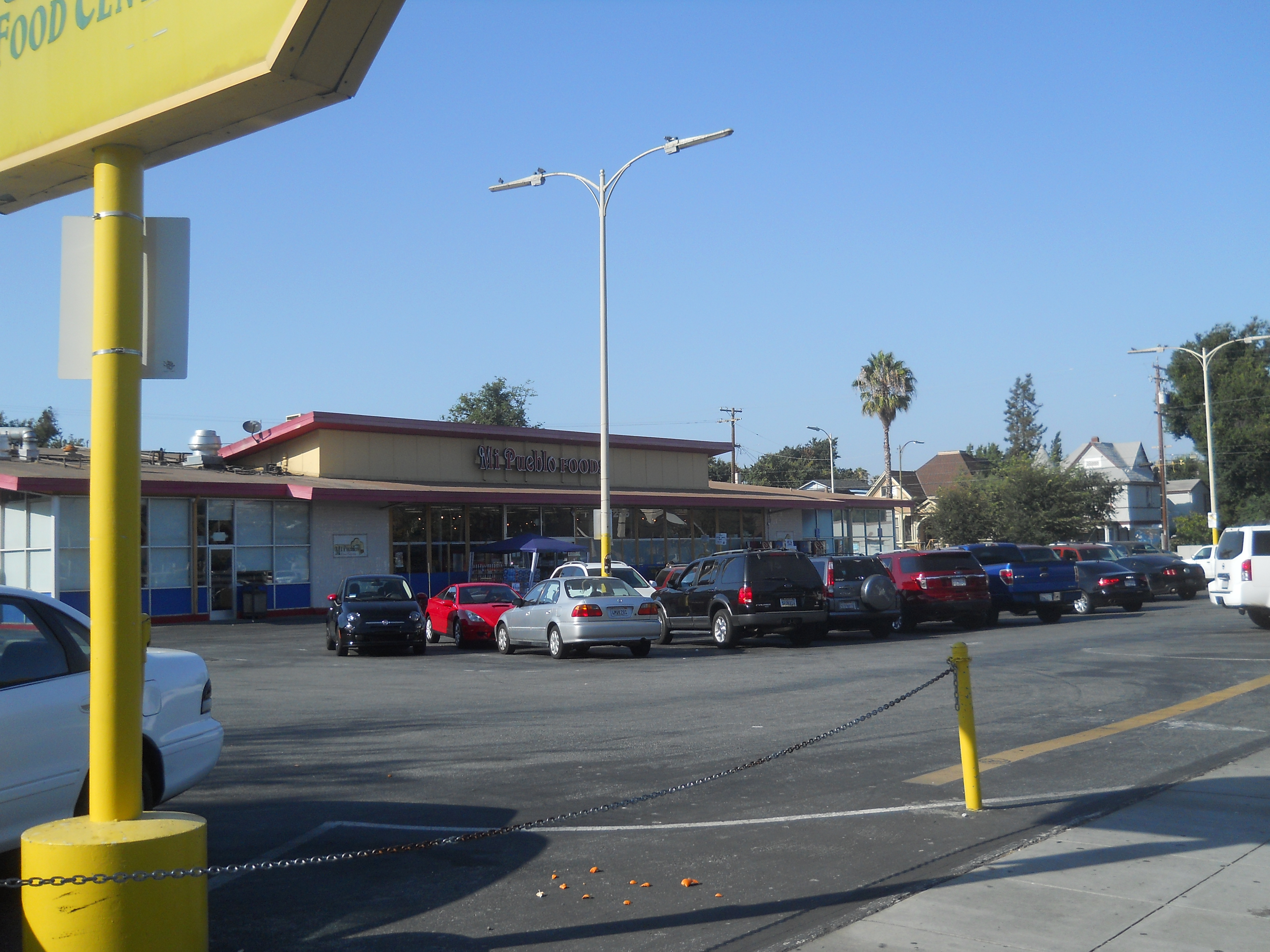
Mi Pueblo supermarket in San Jose, California

While expanding into Fruitvale, the local merchants association protested the opening of a Mi Pueblo location, on the grounds that it would take business away from local small businesses.

=== Bankruptcy ===
On July 22, 2013, Mi Pueblo filed for Chapter 11 bankruptcy. Less than a year later on June 4, 2014, Mi Pueblo announced that they formally emerged from Chapter 11 reorganization after receiving $56 million in financing from Chicago- based investment firm Victory Park Capital (VPC). As part of the restructuring, Javier Ramírez was appointed as president and CEO, succeeding Juvenal Chávez who was named chairman of the board.

=== Acquisition ===
The chain was purchased in 2016 by Kohlberg Kravis Roberts and merged with Cardenas. The Mi Pueblo brand was phased out the following year.

== Products and services ==
Mi Pueblo had seven different departments in the store, including meat, produce, bakery, taqueria, tortilleria, deli, and seafood.

In October 2014, Mi Pueblo started offering Western Union services throughout all its stores in the San Francisco Bay Area, Monterey Bay Peninsula and Central Valley to enhance existing customer needs such as check cashing, utility payments, money transfers and money orders.

== Community involvement ==
In 2011, Mi Pueblo launched a scholarship program to "help students prepare for a brighter future". Three years later, Mi Pueblo, in collaboration with partners including the Mexican Heritage Corporation and Consul General of Mexico, raised over $100,000 to provide legal representation to unaccompanied minors at the US-Mexico border through its month- long campaign Unidos por los Niños.

== Controversy over immigration checks ==
In September 2012, Mi Pueblo was criticized by labor organizations for enrolling in E-verify, a Department of Homeland Security program which screens employees for irregularities in their immigration status. As an owner, Juvenal Chávez was accused of hypocrisy since he started out in business as an illegal immigrant. A spokesperson for the business said that Chávez supported fixing the "broken" immigration system.
