= Super King Markets =

American supermarket chain

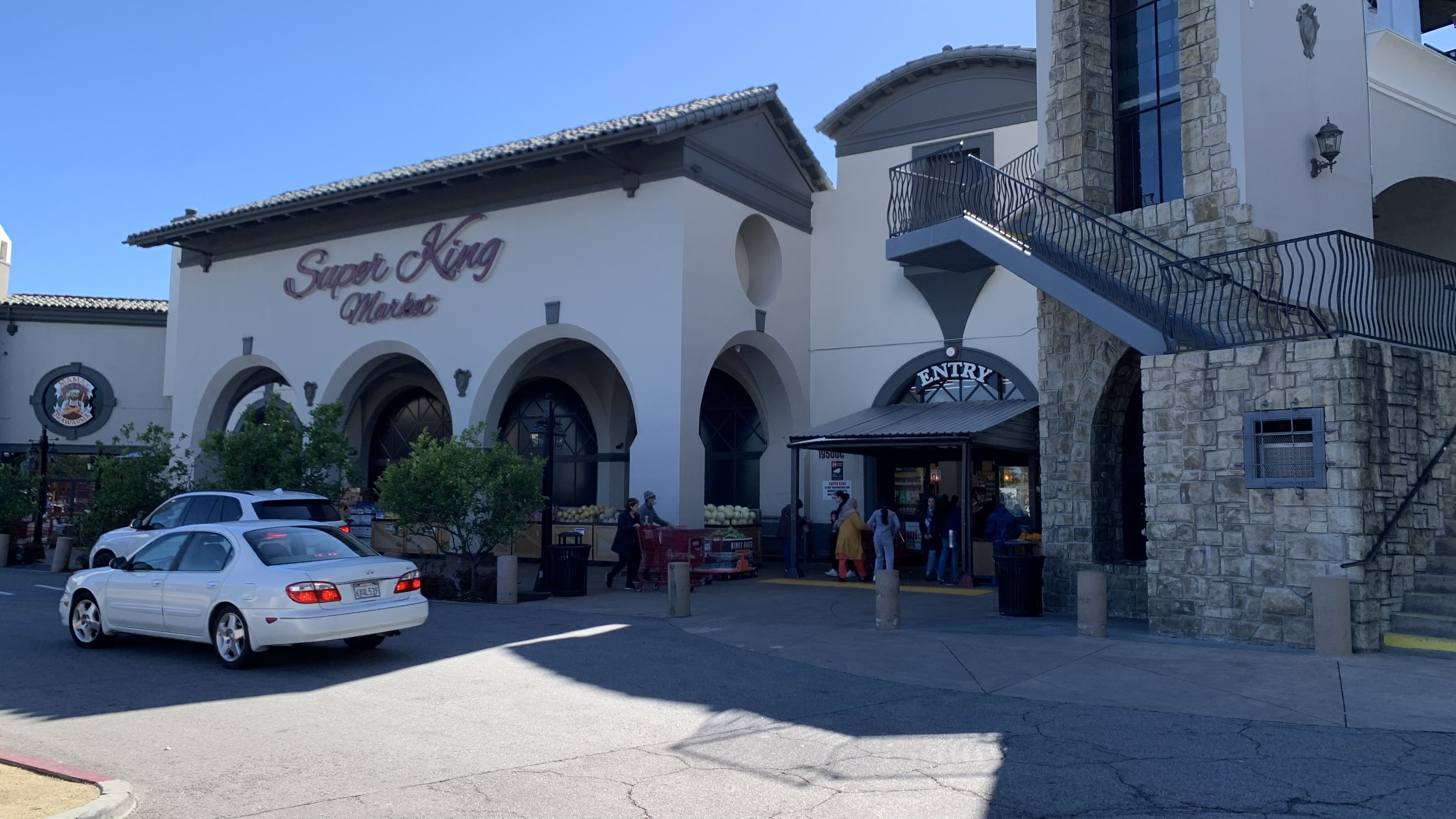
- A Super King Markets supermarket in Northridge, Los Angeles
- Type: Private
- Industry: Retail (Supermarket)
- Founded: 1993 in Anaheim, California
- Founder: Peter & Mary Fermanian, Vache Fermanian
- Headquarters: Los Angeles, California, United States
- Number of locations: 12 supermarkets
- Area served: Greater Los Angeles
- Owner: Fermanian family
- Members: >1,600 (2016)
- Website: https://superkingmarkets.com

Super King Markets is an American supermarket chain located in the Greater Los Angeles region. As of 2016, Super King Markets has more than 1,600 team members and as of 2025, have 9 locations in total. Super King Markets is headquartered in Los Angeles, California.

== History ==
Super King Markets, which at the time was called Anaheim King Market, was founded in 1993 by the Fermanian family in Anaheim, California. In 2009, Super King Markets was selected for having the "Best Ethnic Deli Counter" by LA Weekly. In February 2016, Super King Markets won the Unified Grocers' Ben Schwartz Retail Grocery Visionary Award. In 2019, Super King Markets had around 200,000 customers per week.

== Locations ==
Super King Markets has supermarkets at the following locations:

- Anaheim
- Altadena
- Claremont
- Culver City
- Glendale
- Glassell Park
- North Hills
- Northridge
- Santa Ana
- Torrance
- Van Nuys
