= Seabra Foods =

American supermarket chain

- Company type: Private; family business
- Industry: Retail
- Founded: 1982; 44 years ago in Newark, New Jersey, U.S.
- Founder: Antonio Seabra
- Headquarters: Newark, New Jersey, U.S.
- Number of locations: 16 (2021)
- Area served: New Jersey, South Florida, Rhode Island and Massachusetts
- Key people: Antonio Seabra (President)
- Products: Bakery, delicatessen, dairy, grocery, frozen foods, organic foods, bulk foods, sushi, meat, produce, seafood, wine, beer, spirits, floral products, pet supplies, general merchandise,
- Services: Convenience stores, car wash, online shopping
- Revenue: ▲$53 million
- Number of employees: 2,000 (2021)
- Website: seabrafoods.com

Seabra Foods is a privately held, family-owned U.S. supermarket chain based in Newark, New Jersey. Established in 1982, Seabra operates 18 locations in Rhode Island, Massachusetts, New Jersey and Florida.

== Overview ==
Seabra Foods sells ethnic food products from Portugal, Brazil, Ecuador, Peru, Mexico, Spain and other countries.

== History ==
Seabra Foods was founded in 1967 by Americo Nunes Seabra, an immigrant from Portugal. In 2018, the chain acquired two Lucky's Market locations, effectively entering the Southern Florida market.
