= Brookshire's =

American supermarket chain

Brookshire Grocery Company
- Type: Private
- Industry: Retail (grocery)
- Founded: September 1, 1928; 98 years ago, in Tyler, Texas, United States
- Founder: Wood T. Brookshire and Louise Brookeshire
- Headquarters: 1600 W. Southwest Loop 323; Tyler, Texas, 75701 United States
- Number of locations: 200+
- Area served: Texas, Louisiana, Arkansas, Oklahoma
- Key people: Jerry LeClair (CEO)
- Brands: Goldenbrook Farms; Sunnybrook Farms; Dairy Pride
- Number of employees: 14,000+
- Divisions: Brookshire's; Super 1 Foods; Spring Market; FRESH by Brookshire's; Reasor's; FRESH by Reasor's
- Website: www.brookshires.com

Brookshire Grocery Company is an American supermarket chain based in Tyler, Texas. There are more than 200 stores in Texas, Louisiana, Arkansas, and Oklahoma under their six banners: Brookshire's, Super 1 Foods, Spring Market, Fresh by Brookshire's, Reasor's and Fresh by Reasor's.

== History ==
=== Origins (1928–1939) ===
Brookshire Grocery Company traces its origins to September 1, 1928, when founder Wood T. Brookshire opened a 2,500‑square‑foot grocery store on the courthouse square in downtown Tyler, Texas. At the time, Wood T. Brookshire was part of the larger Brookshire Brothers organization, founded in 1921 in Lufkin, Texas, by brothers Austin and Tom Brookshire.

In 1929, Wood T. Brookshire and his cousin W.A. Brookshire withdrew from Brookshire Brothers, taking several Tyler‑area stores with them. Brookshire Brothers’ official history identifies this withdrawal as the beginning of what would become Brookshire Grocery Company.

The corporate entity “Brookshire Grocery Company” was formally incorporated in 1939, as noted by the Texas State Historical Association.

=== Expansion and Distribution Growth (1940s–1960s) ===
During the 1940s, Brookshire Grocery Company expanded into neighboring communities and opened its first shopping‑center location. The company opened its first warehouse facility in Tyler in 1953.

In the 1960s, the company expanded into Louisiana and constructed a 175,000‑square‑foot (16,300 m^{2}) distribution center in Tyler to support its growing store base.

=== New Formats and Regional Growth (1970s–1990s) ===
Brookshire Grocery Company continued to expand throughout Texas and Louisiana during the 1970s and 1980s. In 1984, the company opened the first Super 1 Foods store in Alexandria, Louisiana. The format initially operated as a no‑frills, warehouse‑style concept, with early stores often located in repurposed buildings to cut down on costs.

As the format grew, Brookshire Grocery Company began constructing purpose‑built Super 1 Foods stores. In several cases, including Store #608 in Shreveport and Store #612 in Longview, existing Brookshire's locations were closed and demolished to make way for new Super 1 Foods stores. In Marshall and Longview, existing Brookshire's stores were converted to the Super 1 Foods format.

During the late 1990s and early 2000s, the company opened several Super 1 Foods stores in the Dallas–Fort Worth metropolitan area. Brookshire Grocery Company later sold all of its DFW‑area Super 1 Foods stores to the now‑defunct Fleming Companies, which rebranded them as Rainbow Foods. All Rainbow Foods locations closed following Fleming's bankruptcy.

=== Format Development and Modernization (2000s–2010s) ===
On March 10, 2011, Brookshire Grocery Company opened the first FRESH by Brookshire's store in Tyler, Texas, featuring expanded foodservice departments and a broader selection of natural and organic products. The company launched the annual FRESH 15 road race in 2014.

In 2012, a new‑format Super 1 Foods store opened in Carencro, Louisiana, featuring an updated floorplan and décor package that was later adopted across additional locations. A similar store was built to replace #610 in Tyler, TX.

Brookshire's and Super 1 Foods also hosted the Heroes Run, a half marathon, 5K, and Kids 1K event held in Shreveport, Louisiana. In 2016, the event drew approximately 1,500 participants and raised $40,000 for local first responders and military charities. Brookshires indefinitely terminated Hero's Run in 2024 due to costs outpacing the money raised.

In June 2016, Brookshire Grocery Company purchased 25 former Wal‑Mart Express stores located in Texas (20 locations) and Louisiana. These locations were rebranded as Spring Market.

=== Acquisitions and New Concepts (2020s–2026) ===
In November 2021, Brookshire Grocery Company announced its acquisition of all 17 Reasor's locations in Oklahoma, with the transaction finalized in 2022.

On March 2, 2022, Brookshire Grocery Company opened its second FRESH by Brookshire's location in Fate, Texas.

The company later announced the conversion of two former Uptown Grocery locations in The Village and Edmond, Oklahoma, into FRESH by Reasor's stores. These locations temporarily closed on October 22, 2025, and reopened on October 27, 2025, marking the first time the FRESH concept operated outside Texas.

On November 12, 2025, Brookshire Grocery Company opened a 66,000‑square‑foot Fresh by Brookshire's store in Longview, Texas, the third, and largest Fresh location to date. This location features expanded amenities such as a sushi counter, taqueria bar, brick oven pizza, gelato station, artisan bakery, and an outdoor patio with a grill, bar, live music stage, and playground.

In late 2025, Brookshire Grocery Company converted two former Winn‑Dixie locations in Baton Rouge, Louisiana, into Super 1 Foods stores.

== The Present ==
Today, the company has more than 14,000 employee/partners at over 200 locations in four states - Texas, Louisiana, Arkansas and Oklahoma. BGC has six brands: Brookshire's, Fresh by Brookshire's, Super 1 Foods, Spring Market, Reasor's and Fresh by Reasor's.

The company also operates three distribution facilities – two based in Tyler, TX, and one in Monroe, LA – with more than 2 million total square feet and a company fleet of 72 tractors and more than 300 trailers. BGC's internal manufacturing facilities include bakery, dairy, ice cream, yogurt, fresh-cut, ice and water/drink plants in the Tyler area.

== Mississippi operations ==
In 2002, Brookshire's bought four Albertsons stores in Mississippi. These stores were located in North Jackson, South Jackson, Ridgeland, and Flowood. The North Jackson store was the newest of the four locations, having opened in 2001, while the three other area stores opened in 1997.

On February 11, 2010, after a decline in market grocery shares against Kroger and Walmart, Brookshire's exited Mississippi with the sale of the Flowood and Ridgeland stores to Kroger and the closure of the two Jackson stores. In late 2011, Brookshire's sold their South Jackson store to Kosciusko, MS based supermarket chain Food Depot, operated by Potter and Sims Foods. The North Jackson location was converted into a Virginia College location. Virginia College closed in December 2018. The former grocery store still remains vacant.
