= Bravo (supermarket) =

American supermarket chain

Bravo Supermarkets
- Type: Private
- Industry: Grocery
- Founded: 1991; 35 years ago
- Headquarters: New York City
- Number of locations: 84
- Website: Bravo supermarkets website

Bravo is a supermarket chain with stores in the northeastern and southeastern United States. The company's headquarters are in New York. It is the second largest Hispanic focused supermarket chain in the United States, with only El Super being larger. The company launched the El Sabor de tu Pais ("The Flavor of your Country") advertising campaign.

In the early 1990s, many independently owned Bravo stores opened in New York City. Bravo is a midsize supermarket.

Bravo stopped advertising with the New York Daily News after the paper ran a series derogatory of supermarket chains in the city. Bravo later resumed advertising with the paper after the Daily News mended fences with the industry.

The store carries Krasdale Foods brands.
