= Riesbeck's Food Markets =

American grocery store chain

- Type: Private
- Industry: Retail
- Founded: 1925
- Headquarters: St. Clairsville, Ohio
- Key people: Margret (Schumacher) Riesbeck, Barney Riesbeck, Richard Riesbeck
- Products: Bakery, dairy, deli, frozen foods, grocery, meat, pharmacy, produce, seafood, snacks, and other groceries
- Number of employees: 1,260 (2016)
- Website: www.riesbeckfoods.com

Riesbeck's Food Markets, also known as simply Riesbeck's, is a chain of 15 grocery stores in Ohio and West Virginia, US. It is headquartered in St. Clairsville, Ohio. As of October 2025, four of the stores include pharmacies.

Clement Riesbeck died in the 1920s, and his widow, Margret (Schumacher) Riesbeck, moved from Martins Ferry, Ohio, to Woodsfield, Ohio. Several years later Margret opened the "corner grocery" store in 1925 to support her family. Then in 1932, "Grandma", as Margaret was known, opened the first "Riesbeck's" elsewhere in Woodsfield, on a larger plot of land that allowed the construction of a store several times the size of the first, where it still stands.

The company is employee-owned, with a majority of the company's stock owned by its employees. It was ranked the 96th largest employee-owned company on the National Center for Employee Ownership's 2016 Employee Ownership 100 list, with 1,260 employees.
