= FoodLand =

American supermarket chain

- FoodLand current logo

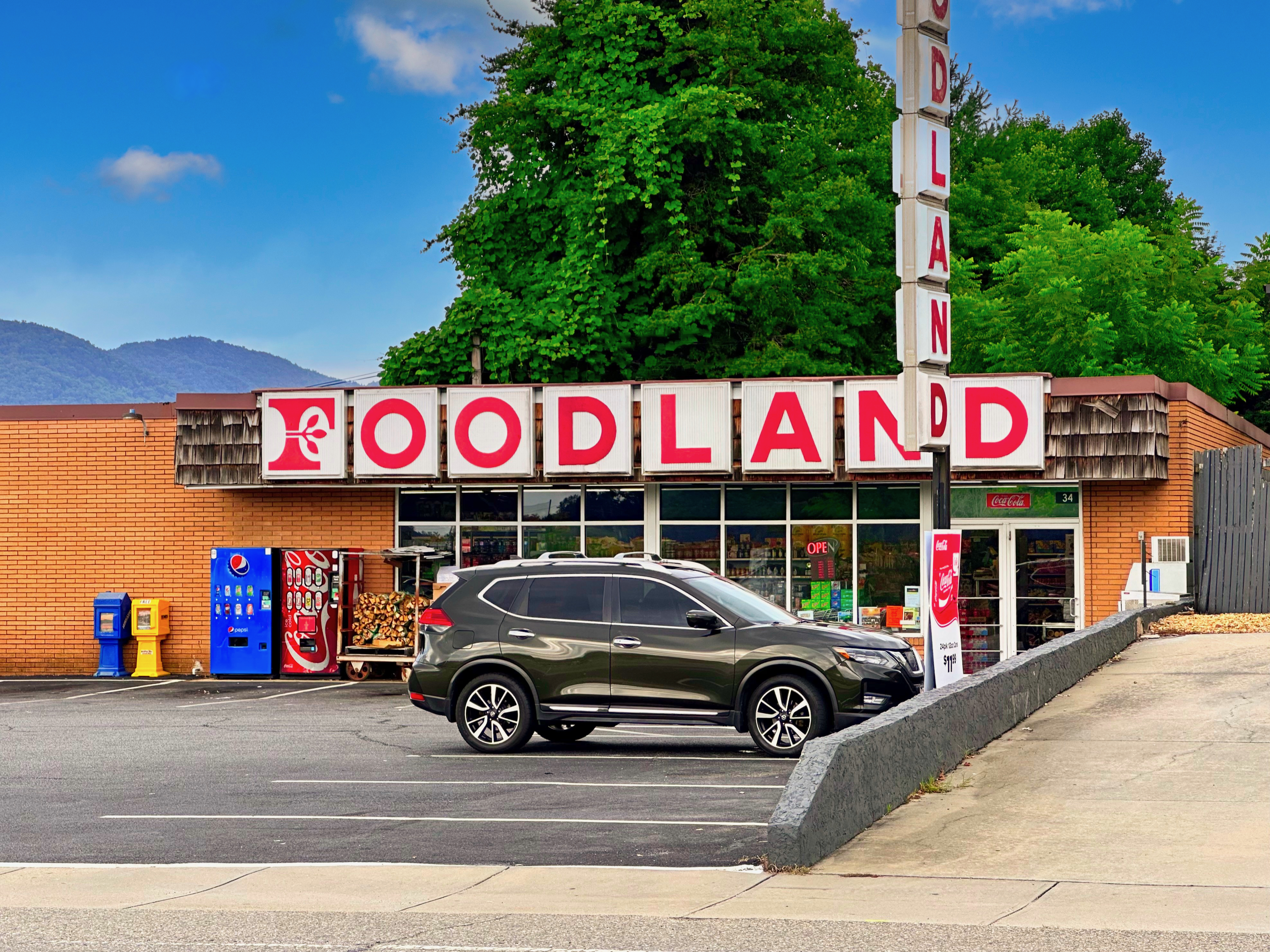
- Foodland store in Blairsville, Georgia
- Founded: 1961
- Website: foodlandgrocery.com (stores in the Southern US) foodlandstores.com (stores in Pennsylvania & West Virginia)

FoodLand is a regional American supermarket chain based in New Stanton, Pennsylvania owned by the United Natural Foods Corporation (UNFI).

In 1961, FoodLand and Clover Farms had 3,150 members and 47 wholesalers sign a voluntary agreement to supply them. In 1965, Foodland and Clover Farms had 3,900 member stores and 38 wholesale outlets. One of them was Scheidelman, Inc. of Utica, New York, which at its peak supplied and sponsored over 40 FoodLand and Clover Farms Superette. Scheidelman was the third-largest wholesale outlet in terms of franchise and volume in 1965, just two years after Scheidelman signed an agreement with FoodLand. Another franchise of Foodland and Clover Farms was F.C. Tripi Co of Buffalo, New York which signed up in 1961. In 1965 they bought the assets of another franchisee, J.B. Maltby Co of Corning, New York who supplied mostly Clover Farm stores in the southern tier of New York and northern Pennsylvania. Tripi was supplying 50 combined Foodland and Clover Farm stores at the time of the acquisition.

In 1965, Foodland and Clover Farms also merged operations under one umbrella; "Two national voluntary groups, Foodland, Inc., and the Clover Farm Stores Corp., have been combined and will be known as The Foodland - Clover Farm Co."

In 1980, Foodland was described as the "[s]econd largest wholesale food distributor to independent retail grocers in the country." Foodland neither owns nor operates stores. It supplies affiliated independent grocers with fresh produce, meat and packaged foods."

In 1985, they relocated their headquarters from Atlanta, Georgia to a district facility in Rostraver Township, Pennsylvania.
