= Fresh Thyme =

American organic supermarket chain

Fresh Thyme Market
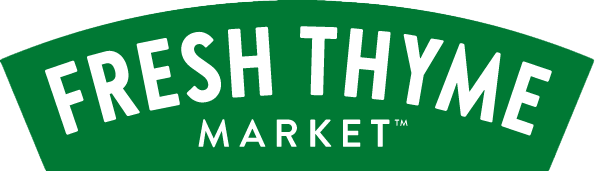

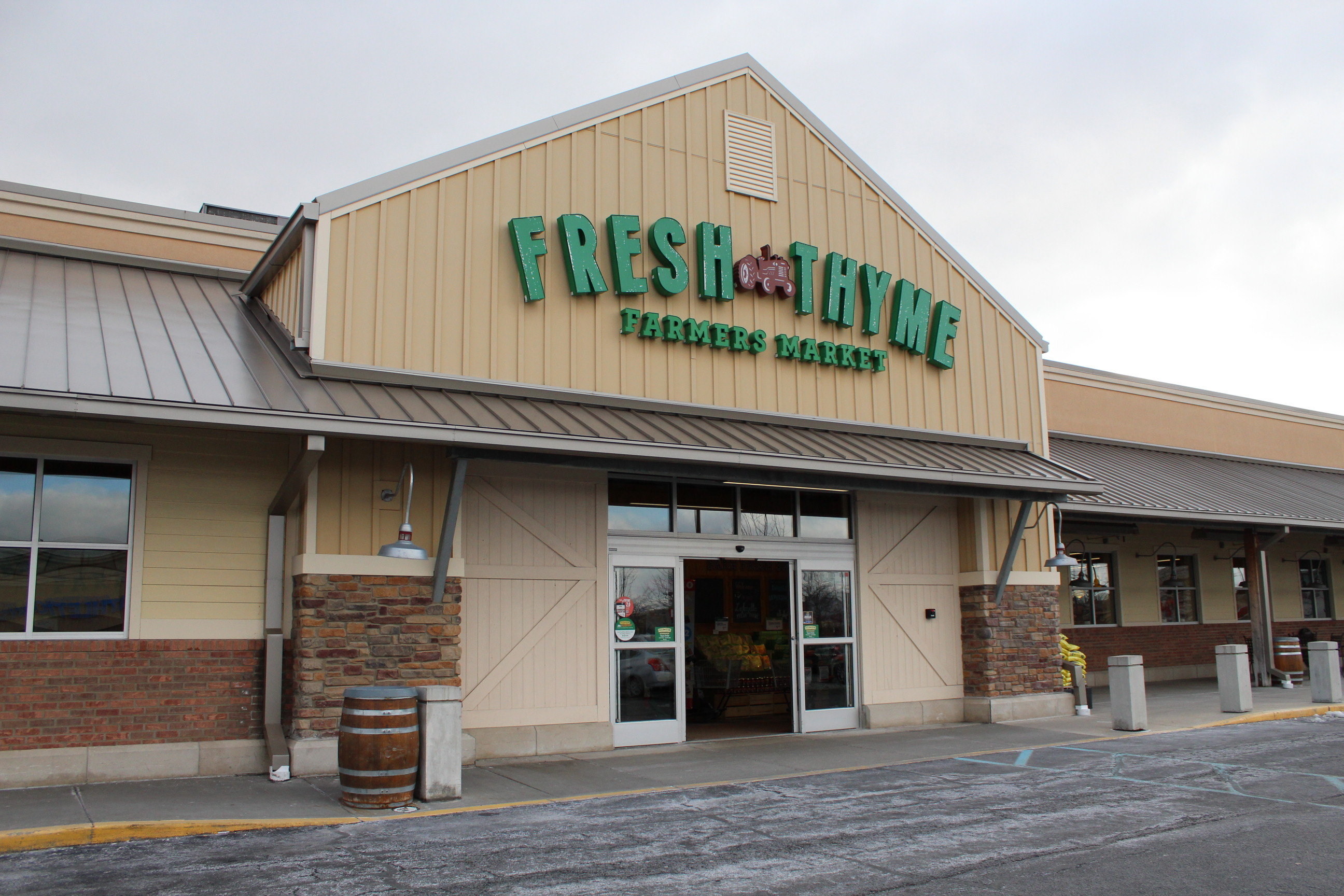
- Fresh Thyme Market in Lafayette, Indiana (2020)
- Company type: Private
- Industry: Retail groceries
- Founded: April 2014; 11 years ago in Mt. Prospect, Illinois, U.S.
- Founder: Chris Sherrell
- Headquarters: Downers Grove, Illinois, U.S.
- Number of locations: 70 (January 2024)
- Areas served: Midwest
- Key people: Liz Zolcak (CEO)
- Website: www.freshthyme.com

Fresh Thyme Market is an American regional organic food supermarket chain based in Downers Grove, Illinois. Its locations are mostly throughout the Midwestern United States.

In 2023, Fresh Thyme was ranked number 13 out of 43 on Forbes' America's Best Midsize Employers in the Retail and Wholesale Industry Category and 218 out of 500 overall on the Forbes' list. The company was also the recipient of WholeFoods Magazine's Retailer of the Year award in 2022.

== History ==
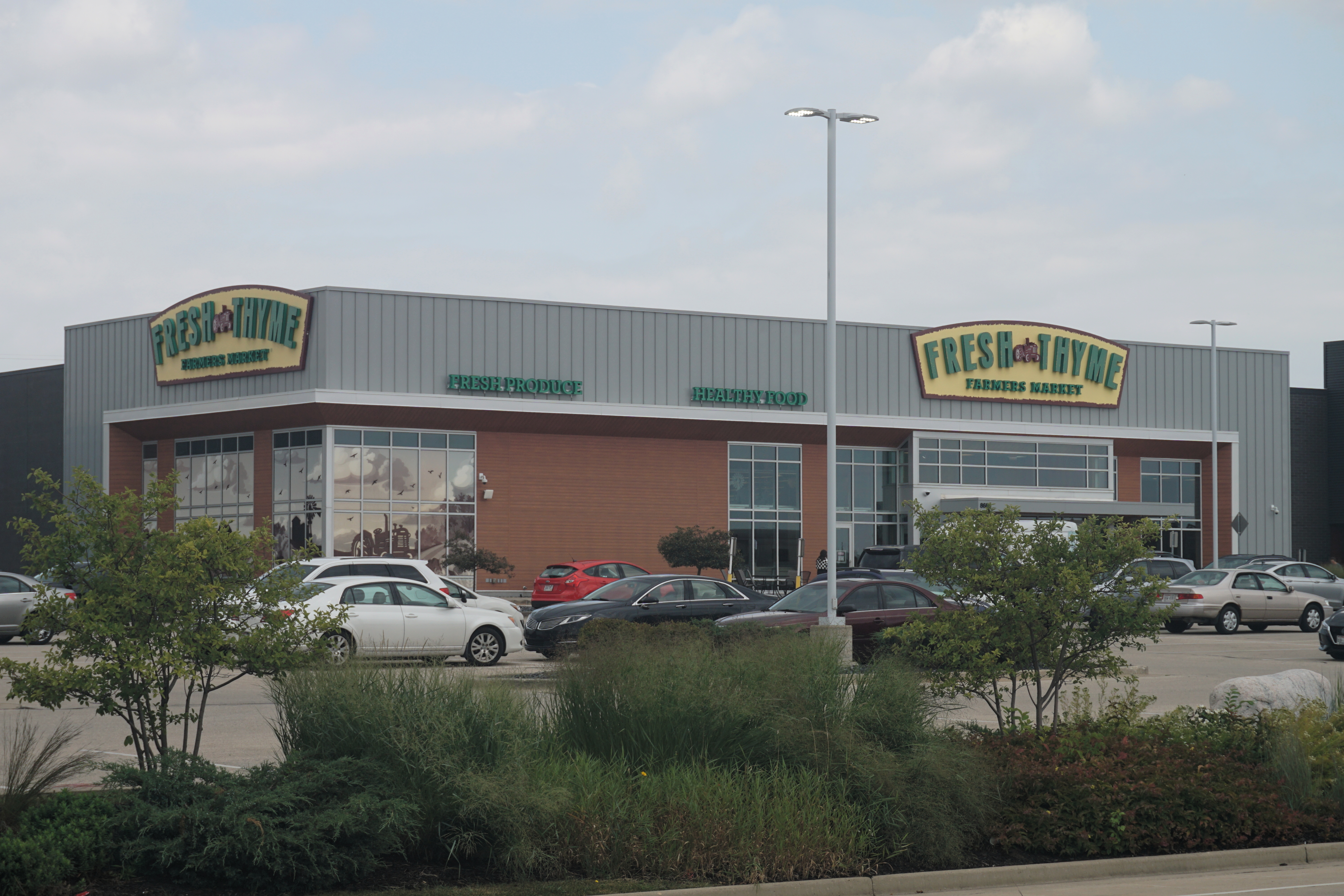
Fresh Thyme in Greenfield, Wisconsin (2024)

In April 2014, Chris Sherrell opened the first store in his chain as Fresh Thyme Farmers Market in Mount Prospect, Illinois. Two months later, Fresh Thyme opened its first Indiana store in Indianapolis. The opening of the first store in Ohio followed in July in Columbus. By the end of 2014, the chain had nine stores in the Midwest.

In April 2015, the first Michigan store was opened in East Lansing. By August 2015, the company had 28 stores in Illinois, Indiana, Michigan and Ohio, with stores planned for Minnesota and Missouri. In September 2015, Fresh Thyme opened its first Minnesota store in Plymouth. By November 2015, two stores were opened for the first time in Missouri.

In February 2016, the first store in Nebraska was opened in Lincoln, which is also the 30th store in the chain. This was followed a few weeks later by the opening of the first store in Iowa in West Des Moines. This was followed in a few weeks with the first store in Kentucky by opening of a store in Louisville, which is also the 36th store of the chain. In the following month, Fresh Thyme was able to enter Wisconsin by opening its first store in the state in Milwaukee.

Fresh Thyme expanded east into Pennsylvania in June 2018 by opening two stores in the Pittsburgh area. In 2019, the company closed under-performing stores in Dayton, Ohio; Louisville, Kentucky; Ames, Iowa; Grand Island, Nebraska; and Omaha, Nebraska.

When founder and CEO Sherrell left the company in November 2019 and was replaced by Meijer executive Gerald Melville, the chain had expanded to 77 stores in 11 states. In August 2020, Fresh Thyme streamlined their image by changing their name to "Fresh Thyme Market" by getting rid of the word "Farmers" and removing the tractor from their new logo.

In September 2020, Fresh Thyme announced that it was withdrawing from the state of Nebraska by closing its remaining three stores after closing two stores the previous year. The closures left the company with 70 stores in 10 states.

Melville retired in July 2022 and was replaced internally by vice president Liz Zolcak. At the time of the change of leadership in 2022, the chain had 71 stores in 10 Midwestern states. By January 2024, the official number stores dropped to 70 stores across 10 Midwestern states after the closing of their first store in Mt. Prospect in August 2023. An under-performing store in Mishawaka, Indiana, was closed in September 2024.

== Relationship with Meijer ==
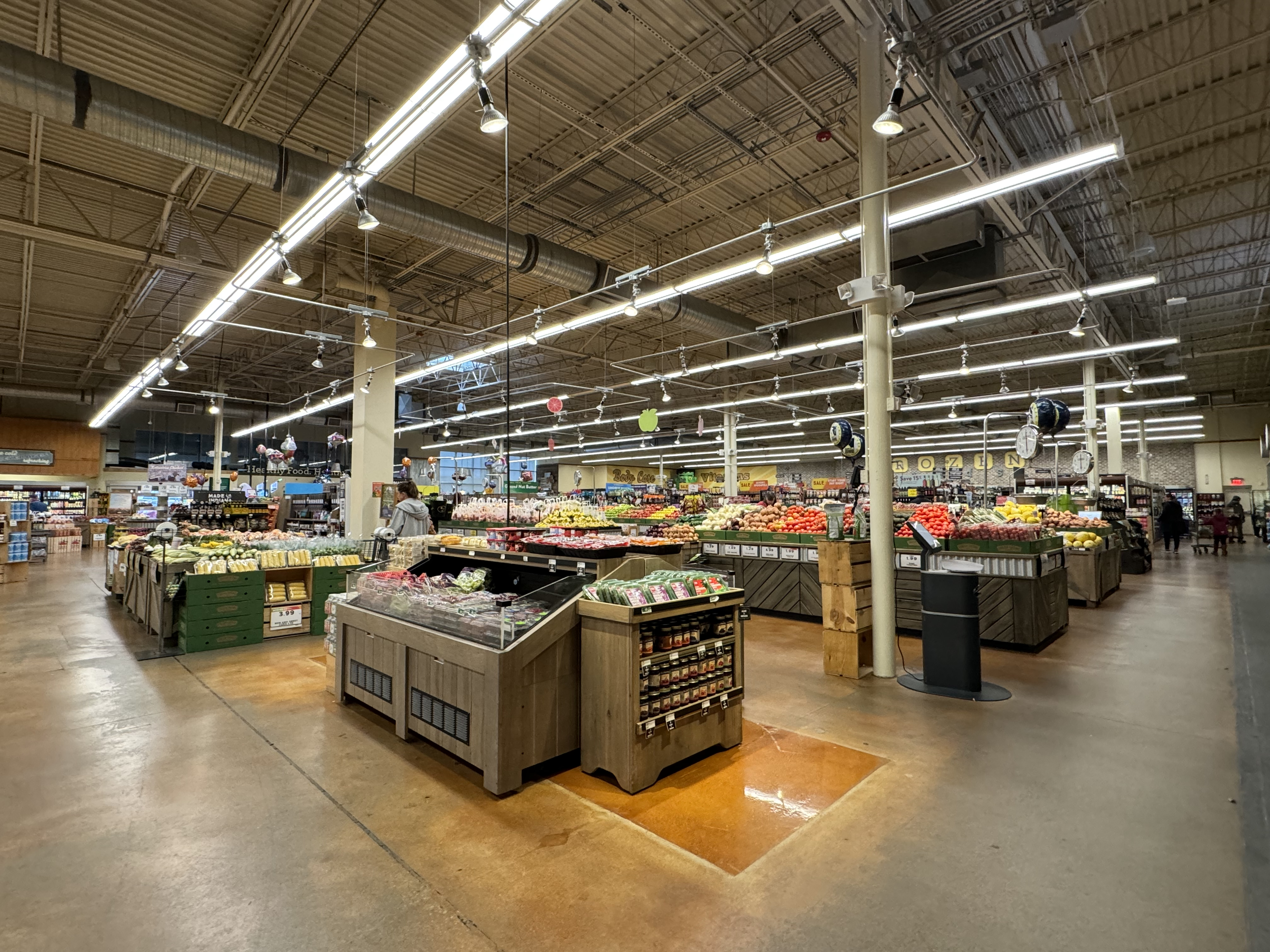
The produce department at a Fresh Thyme store in Greenwood, Indiana.

According to news reports, Midwestern hypermarket chain Meijer is an investor in Fresh Thyme Market—with former Meijer executives serving on the Fresh Thyme board—but that there was no additional corporate connection. For a number of years, the company's chief executive officer was a former Meijer executive. In 2021, the organic food supermarket chain began to offer a "broad assortment of Meijer branded items".
