= La Michoacana Meat Market =

American supermarket chain

- Type: Private
- Industry: Retail (grocery stores, Convenience stores)
- Founded: 1986; 40 years ago
- Headquarters: Houston, Texas, U.S.
- Number of locations: 135
- Website: lamichoacanameatmarket.com

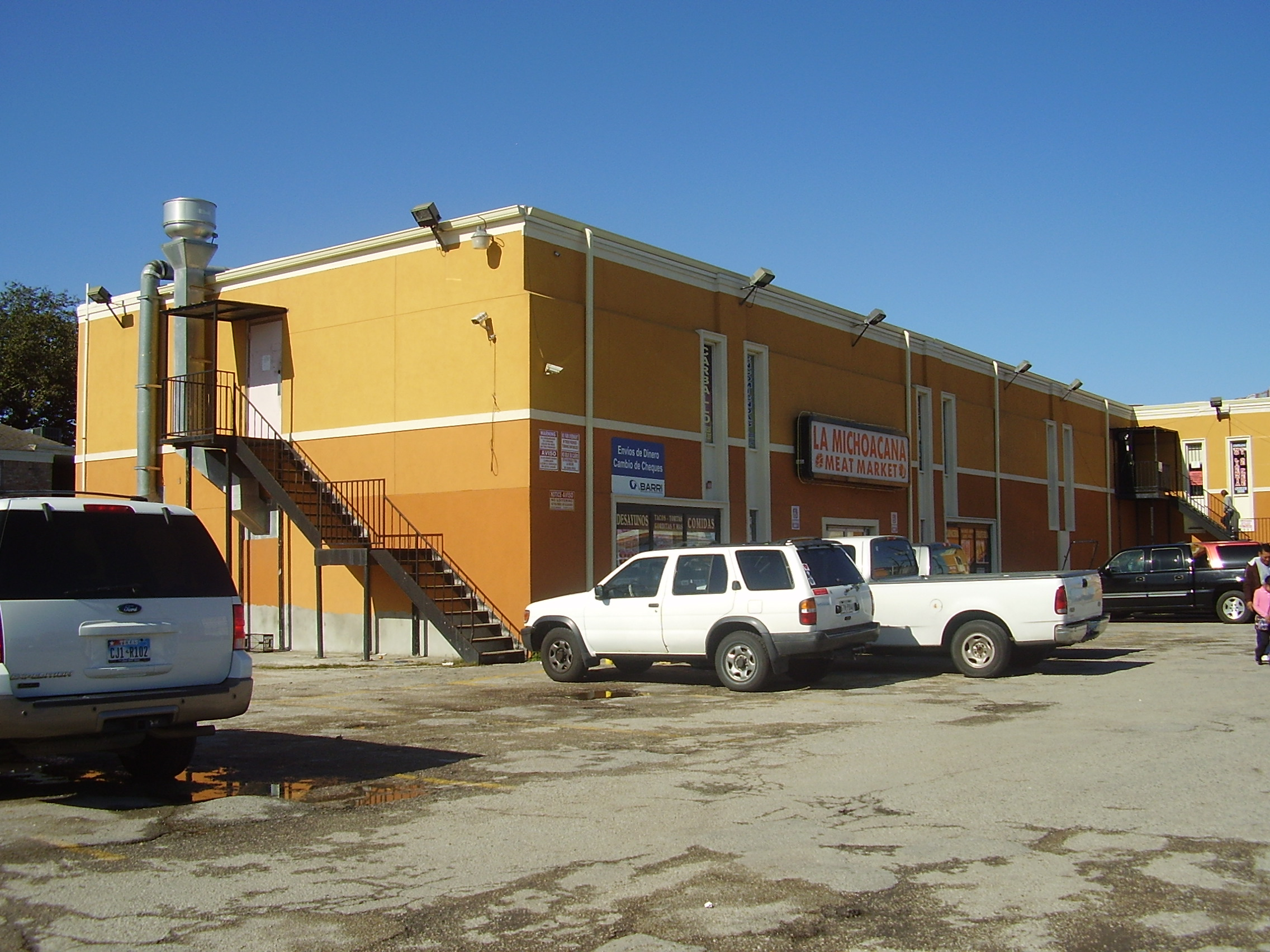
A La Michoacana location in Houston

La Michoacana Meat Market is a chain of Hispanic specialty stores and grocery stores in the United States, headquartered in Spring Branch, Houston, Texas. Rafael Ortega, founder, has about 135 stores throughout Texas and Oklahoma. The chain is named after the Mexican state of Michoacán located on Mexico's Pacific coast.

The stores are located in an area stretching from the Rio Grande Valley to Oklahoma City, Oklahoma. A large portion of the stores are located in Greater Houston. The chain caters to Hispanic Americans. In 1999 the chain sold more goat meat than beef. The chain also operates Panaderia La Michoacana, a bakery. The chain is known for its small to medium sized stores and convenient setting offering both groceries and ready to eat food.

La Michoacana was founded in Houston in 1986.

Ortega, the owner of La Michoacana, also operates El Ahorro Supermarket.
