= Trucchi's =

Trucchi's Supermarkets, Inc.
- Company type: Privately held company
- Industry: Grocery
- Founded: Taunton, Massachusetts, United States (1928)
- Founder: William Trucchi Sr.
- Headquarters: Raynham, Massachusetts, United States
- Number of locations: 6
- Area served: South Shore, Massachusetts
- Key people: James P. Trucchi, President
- Products: Bakery, Dairy, Deli, Frozen Foods, Grocery, Meat, Health & Beauty Aids, and Produce
- Number of employees: 900+
- Parent: Trucchi's Supermarkets, Inc.
- Website: trucchis.com

Trucchi's Supermarkets, Inc., under the trade name Trucchi's (Pronounced: Troo-Key), is a chain of 6 supermarkets in Massachusetts in the United States, with headquarters in Raynham, Massachusetts.

== History ==
Truchhi's was founded in 1928 William Trucchi Sr., launching the store with $500 he borrowed from his parents.

During the Great Depression Hometown Stores managed to operate while extending credit to locals in the area who were unable to pay. After expansions in 1939 and 1947, Hometown Stores was renamed to Tremont Super Market.

In 1952 William purchased R. F. Owens Company, a wholesale grocery company in Brockton, Massachusetts. In 1957 a modern warehouse was erected in Raynham, Massachusetts. Over the next decade growth continued, with the name Trucchi's Supermarket coming about in 1967 with the construction of a new store and Taunton's first shopping center.

In 2015 Trucchi's partnered with the Greater Taunton Charitable Association to run the first Stuff the Bus food drive. In 2019 Trucchi's Supermarkets went under renovation to modernize some antiquated aspects of their stores.
