= SuperValu Pharmacies =

SuperValu Pharmacies, Inc.
- Type: Pharmacies
- Founded: 1985 (41 years ago)
- Headquarters: Franklin Park, Illinois
- Key people: Chris Dimos (president)
- Website: Official website

SuperValu Pharmacies, Inc. is a wholly owned subsidiary of Eden Prairie, Minnesota-based SuperValu. SuperValu Pharmacy operates 950 pharmacies in Shop 'n Save, Hornbacher's, Farm Fresh Food & Pharmacy and Cub Foods stores.

== Ownership ==
SuperValu Pharmacies is owned and operated by the American grocery retailer, SuperValu.

== Operations ==
In 2008, the SuperValu Pharmacies completed company-wide deployment of an in house—developed pharmacy management system called "ARx", design of which began in 2004.

As of 2012, the company operated in 25 US states under 10 brands, including:

- Acme Sav-On and Albertsons Sav-On Pharmacies
- Albertsons Osco, Shaw's Osco, Jewel-Osco and Shop & Save Osco Pharmacies
- Cub Pharmacy
- (New) Farm Fresh Pharmacy
- Shop & Save Pharmacy
- (New) Shoppers Pharmacy

=== Services ===
Services provided by locations owned by the company have included:

- annual in-store influenza vaccination, conducted by staff trained by the company in administration of the vaccine.
- occasional consultations for migraine sufferers to help identify triggers and how to avoid them.

== Corporate governance ==
All members of the company's leadership team are pharmacists, according to a company spokesperson in 2014. As of 2009, the president of SuperValu Pharmacies was Chris Dimos. As of 2012, the company's director of clinical programs was Anthony Provenzano, who in 2012 was provided an interim appointment to the board of the Accreditation Council for Pharmacy Education.
