= Red Owl (retail chain) =

Coal and grocers company in Minnesota

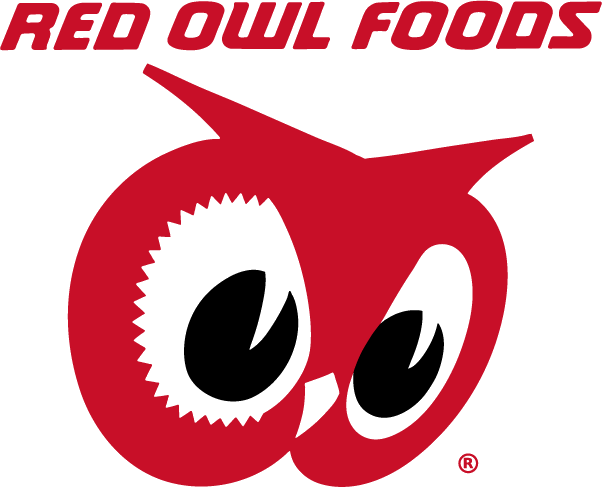

- Red Owl brand spice tins.
- Industry: Retail
- Founded: 1922 (104 years ago)
- Headquarters: Hopkins, Minnesota
- Products: Supermarkets

Red Owl was a grocery store chain in the United States, headquartered in Hopkins, Minnesota. Founded in 1922, it was initially owned and operated by a private investment firm affiliated with General Mills, and purchased in 1968 by Gamble-Skogmo.

== History ==
Red Owl started as a coal company in the 1920s.

It opened its first store at 310 Broadway Avenue on Saturday May 20th, 1922 in Rochester, Minnesota. Eventually there were stores throughout the Upper Midwest, with one having opened in Bismarck, North Dakota, in 1927. The chain briefly expanded into the Chicago area starting in late 1959, but in 1963 sold its Chicago area operations to National Tea Company. In 1980, Gamble-Skogmo was acquired by Wickes Corporation, which sold the chain to three executives of the chain in January 1986. At that time, the company operated 441 stores in Michigan, Wisconsin, Minnesota, Iowa, and North and South Dakota.

In December 1988, the rights to the Red Owl name were obtained by grocery wholesaler Supervalu Inc., along with its warehouse and distribution operations. Supervalu phased out the Red Owl name.

Red Owl operated radio stations KRSI, WEBC and WNAX in the 1960s.

== In popular culture ==
From 1973 to 1977, the title sequence of The Mary Tyler Moore Show featured the lead character in a Red Owl meat department. An independent grocery store in Saint Paul, MN, Cooper's Foods, was redecorated as a Red Owl to be featured in the 2009 Coen Brothers movie A Serious Man.

In Season 3, Episode 1 of FX's Fargo a Red Owl is featured.

In Season 9, Episode 9 of the Sci-Fi Channel's Mystery Science Theater 3000 which features the 1980 Italian film The Pumaman, Mike uses some of the movie's music which resembles commercial theme music to make up a jingle with the phrase "Dick's Red Owl, selection and service!". Mystery Science Theater 3000 originated in Hopkins, MN, which was Red Owl's headquarters.

A pharmacy named Value Drug Mart in Drumheller, was redecorated as a Red Owl food store for the 2020 film Let Him Go.

A replica Red Owl Food Stores paper grocery bag appeared in Episode 2 ("Jane Doe") of the 2025 Netflix Miniseries Untamed.

== Masons Red Owl ==
Masons Red Owl
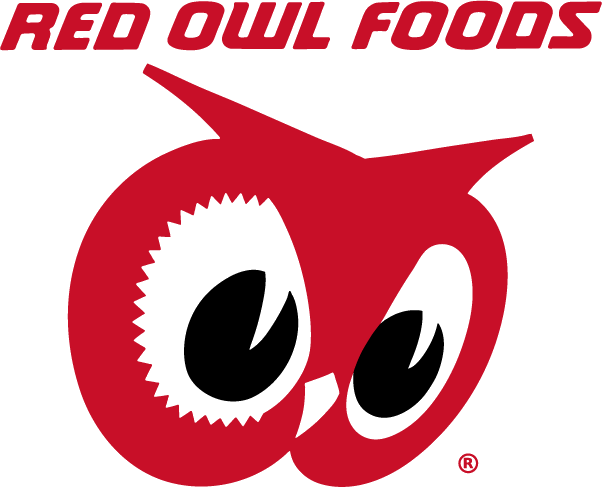
- Type: Grocery/Convenience Store
- Industry: Retail (Grocery)
- Headquarters: Green Bay, WI
- Key people: Mervin and Jared Mason/Jared Jr and Justin Mason
- Products: Fresh and Canned Groceries, Produce, Bakery, Deli, Liquor
- Number of employees: 6
- Website: masonsredowl.com

Founded on February 1, 1969, Masons Red Owl was the first franchised Red Owl store in Green Bay, Wisconsin. Three years later, the owners, Mervin and Jared Mason, purchased a second Red Owl franchise in De Pere, Wisconsin. At that time, Masons Red Owl was incorporated from a partnership into the MEJ Corporation.

By 1985, the Green Bay area witnessed the introduction of several other grocery stores, including a Cub Foods and a Copps Food Center. At this point, the De Pere location was sold and efforts were refocused on the original franchise. In 1988, SuperValu Corporation purchased Red Owl's Green Bay warehouse, making it the supplier for Masons Red Owl.

In 1989 the store expanded to include a full-service deli department, and remained in 2023 as one of the smallest full-service grocery retailers.

Masons Red Owl faces competition in the Green Bay area from other grocers including Woodman's, Wal-Mart, Aldi and Festival Foods.

== Red Owl Family Center ==
In the late 60's early 70's Red Owl opened a small chain of family centers, similar to what Grand Union Supermarkets did with their Grand Way stores.

== See also ==
- Gamble-Skogmo
- General Mills
