= New Grand Mart =

American chain of Latino supermarkets

- Type: Latino supermarket
- Industry: Grocery
- Founded: 2013; 13 years ago Washington, D.C.
- Founder: Kyoo Lee
- Headquarters: Washington metropolitan area
- Area served: Maryland, Virginia
- Owner: Green Paradise Enterprise

New Grand Mart is a Latin supermarket chain primarily located in the Washington, D.C. metropolitan area and the Greater Richmond Region, In 2013, Green Paradise Enterprises bought two former Grand Mart locations in the Washington, D.C. metropolitan area and rebranded the chain as New Grand Mart.

New Grand Mart provides a wide selection of Latin American and East Asian groceries and fresh produce. Depending on the location of the store, it also offers varying amounts of Asian, Latino, African and traditional American groceries. Some stores advertise in the Spanish language media as "Mercado Grande," and have signs in English, Spanish and Korean. Nevertheless, all New Grand Mart supermarkets retain a strong Latino flavor, also include in-store Korean bakeries

== Locations ==
=== Grand Mart ===
Grand Mart's final store to open in the Washington area opened in Frederick, Maryland in 2013. In mid-2008, Grand Mart closed its Security Square Mall location, the only store it had in the Baltimore area. In October 2014, Grand Mart closed its Frederick location.

Grand Mart attempted to expand outside of the Washington area, including more locations in Georgia and North Carolina, and planned stores in Texas and New York. In Chicago, it purchased eight former Cub Foods locations. However, the Grand Mart format was not successful in the Chicago area, and the four stores that were opened (Bedford Park, Chicago, Melrose Park and Niles) subsequently closed. After the closure of the Chicago-area Grand Mart stores, plans for downstate independent grocer Niemann Foods to expand into the Chicago market by acquiring several of the shuttered Grand Mart stores fell through. The Chicago location (at North and Cicero Avenues) is now a Food 4 Less store while the Bedford Park location is now an Art Van Furniture. The Melrose Park location later became a Meijer (which closed on June 17, 2017) and the Niles location is now a Fresh Farms Market.

=== New Grand Mart ===
New Grand Mart has stores in Virginia, Maryland, and Washington, D.C., most of which are targeted primarily toward the Korean American community, which is concentrated heavily in Fairfax and Montgomery counties.

==== Maryland ====
- Capitol Heights
- Germantown
- Langley Park
- New Carrollton
- Baltimore

==== Virginia ====
- Alexandria
- Chesterfield
- Falls Church
- Henrico
- Dumfries
