= Save A Lot =

American retail and grocery company

Save A Lot Food Stores Ltd.
- Type: Private
- Industry: Retail
- Founded: 1977; 49 years ago, Cahokia, Illinois
- Founder: Bill Moran
- Headquarters: St. Ann, Missouri
- Number of locations: 720
- Key people: Fred Boehler (CEO) Bill Mayo (Chief Operating Officer) Ben Hope (Chief Financial Officer) Mark Lacey (Chief Human Resources Officer) Dave Buffa (Chief Legal Officer) Jennifer Hopper (Chief Information & Digital Officer) Chris Stanley (Senior Vice President Distribution Operations)
- Products: Bakery, dairy, deli, frozen foods, general grocery, meat, produce, snacks, seafood, liquor
- Owner: Supervalu (1994–2016); Onex Corporation (2016–2020)
- Website: savealot.com

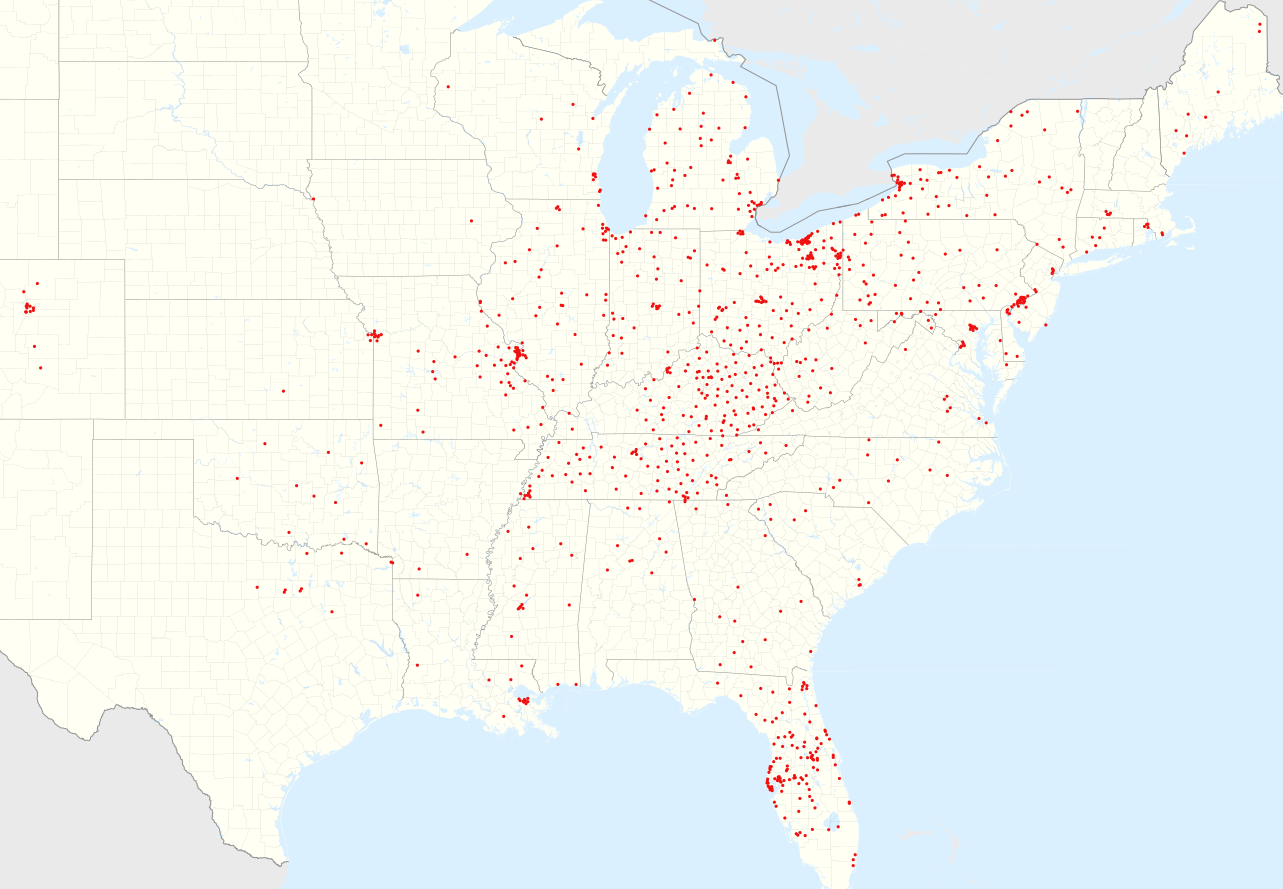
Footprint map of Save-A-Lot locations, as of February 2021

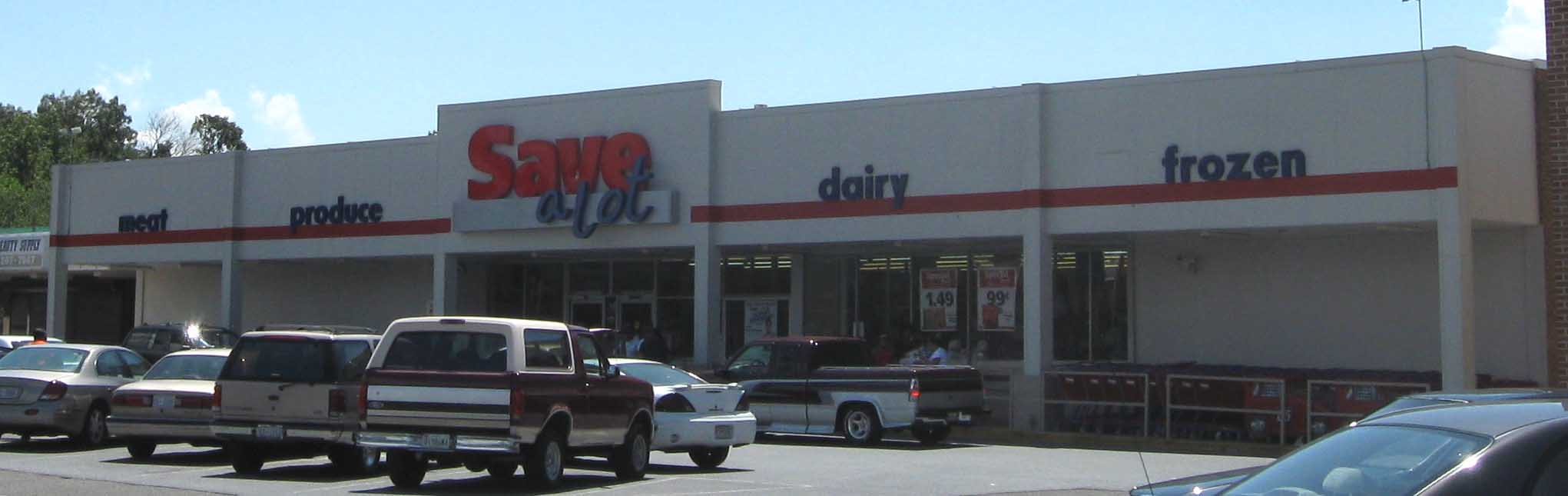
Save A Lot store in Oxon Hill, Maryland, in July 2008

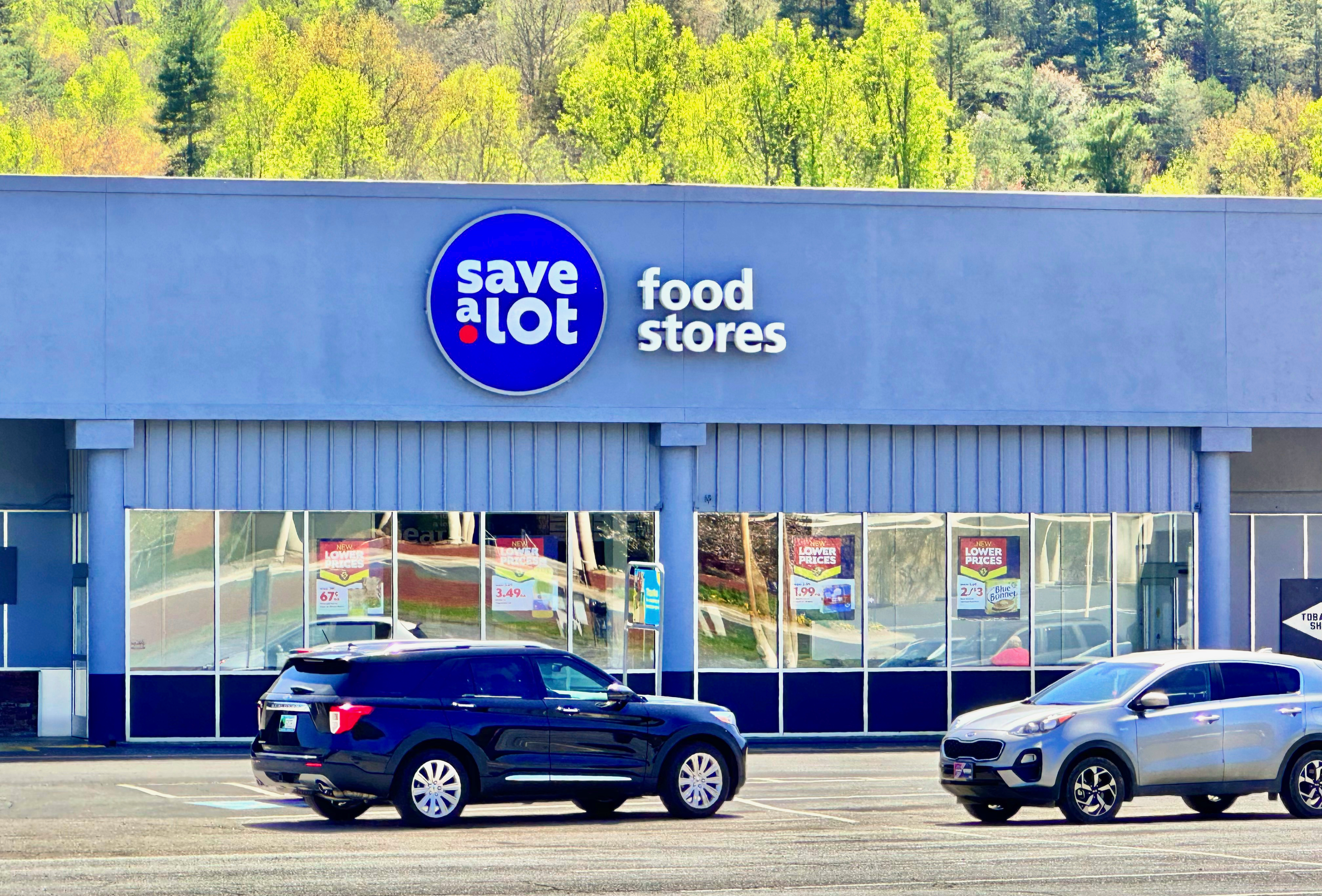
Save A Lot store in Murphy, North Carolina, in April 2023

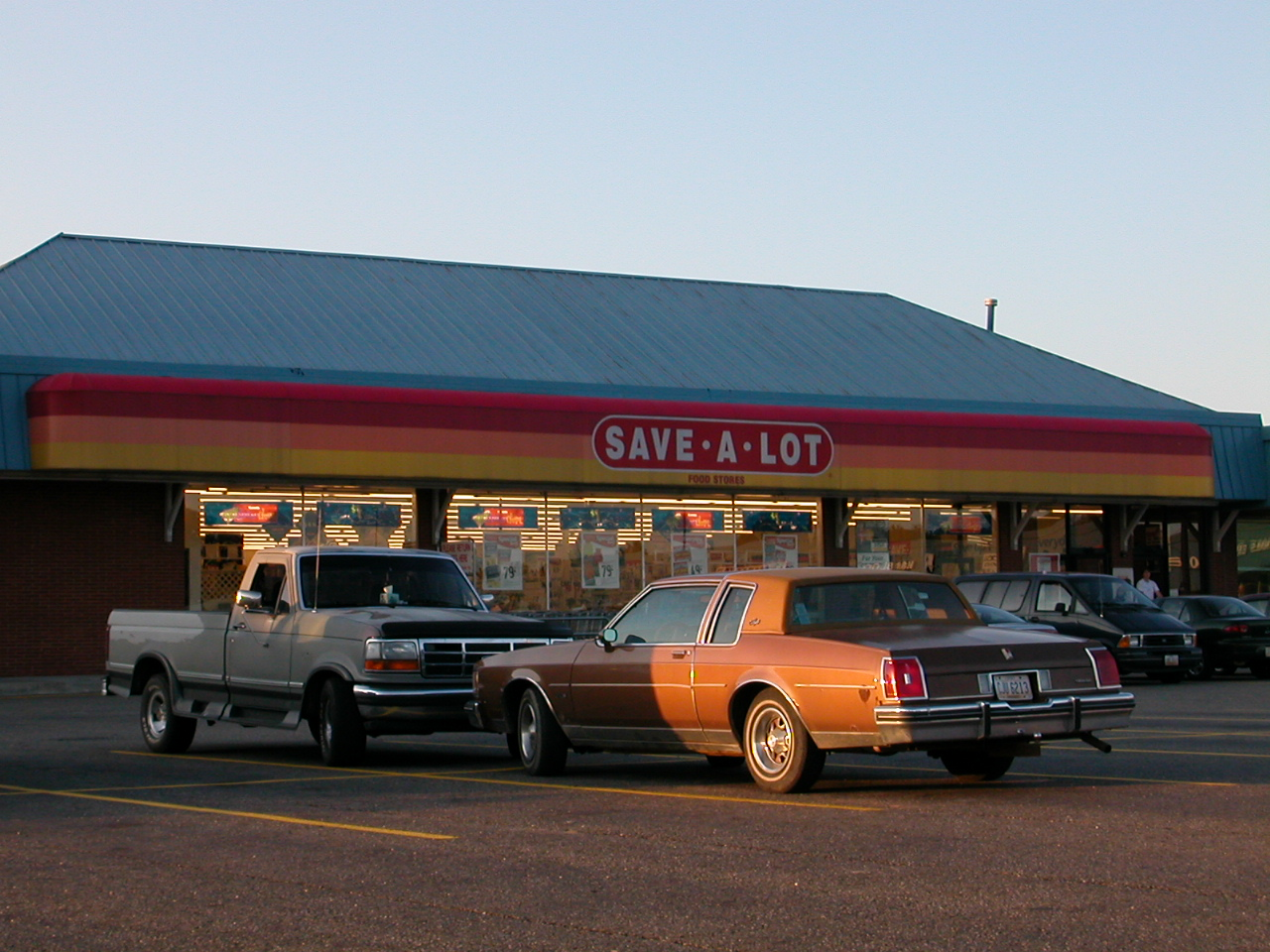
Save A Lot store with the old logo in Streetsboro, Ohio, in June 2003. This has since been remodeled with the current logo. This location closed in 2021.

Logo used until 2018

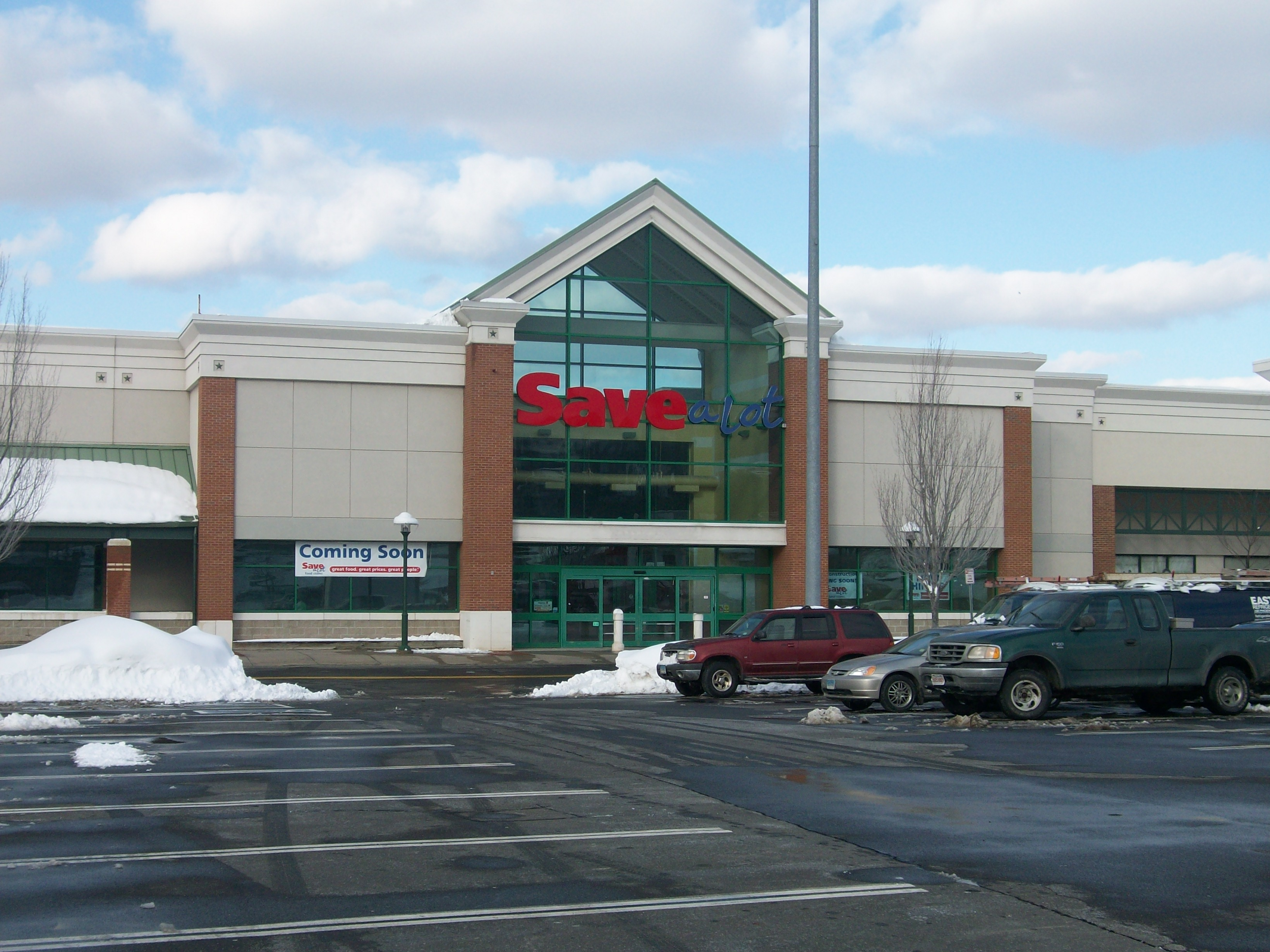
Former Shaw's store rebranded as a Save A Lot in Waterbury, Connecticut, in February 2011

Save A Lot Food Stores Ltd. is an American discount supermarket chain store headquartered in St. Ann, Missouri, in Greater St. Louis. It has about 720 independently owned and operated stores across 32 states in the United States with over $2.6 billion in annual sales.

Stores carry most grocery products, with an assortment of fresh, canned and frozen produce, meat, meal products, household items and everyday groceries. Save A Lot grocery stores sell national brands and private label brands at a discounted price. A typical Save A Lot grocery store is 15,000 square feet (1,400 m^{2}) with items displayed in their cardboard shipping boxes.

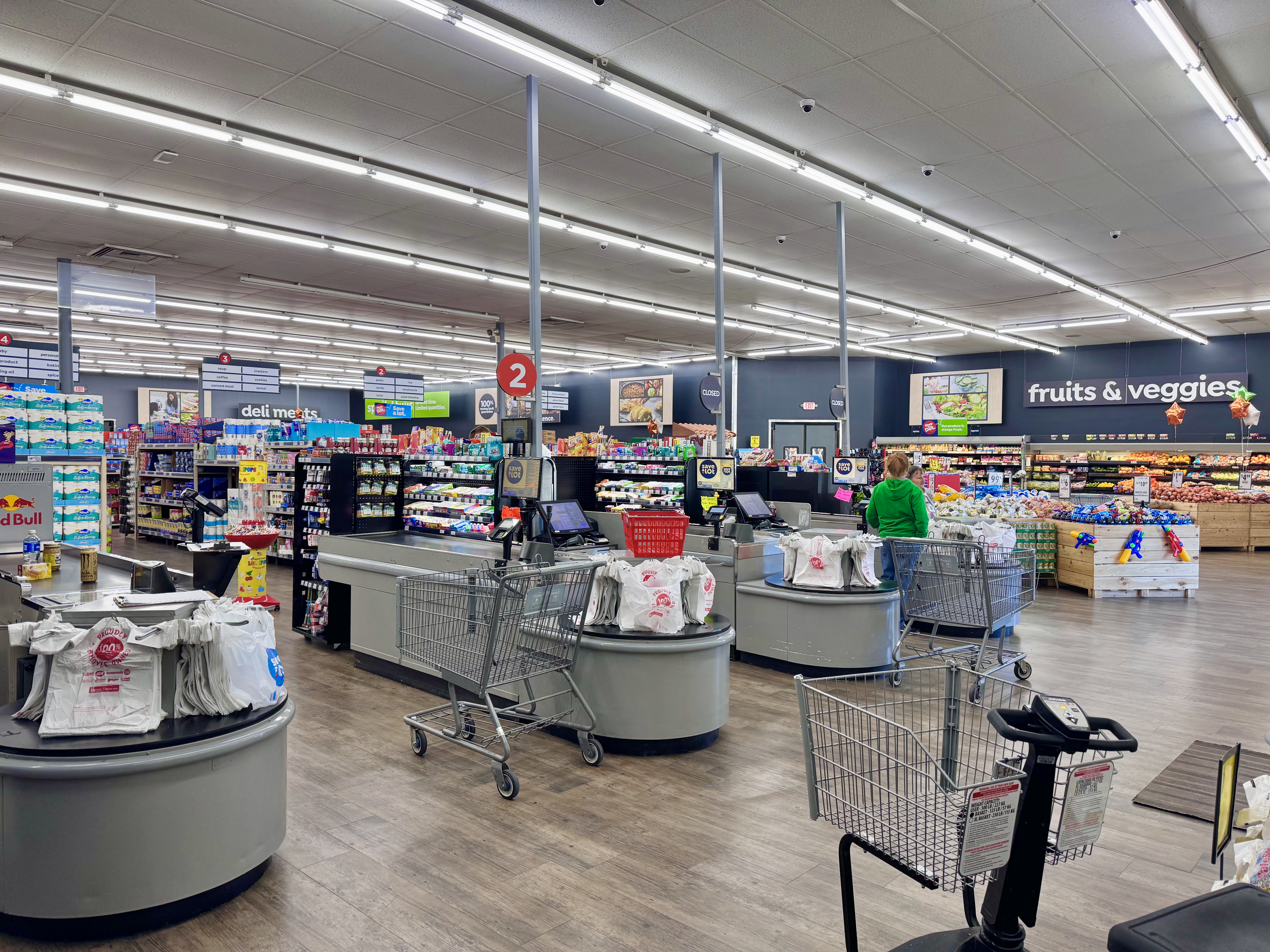
Save A Lot supermarket interior

== History ==
Save A Lot was founded in 1977 by Bill Moran as an alternative to larger supermarkets. He opened the first Save A Lot store in Cahokia, Illinois, and remained with the company until his retirement in 2006.

In 1978, General Grocer Company expanded the company's presence in the greater St. Louis area. Eventually, the store network grew to 30 stores by the end of the decade. At the root of company's growth strategy is its licensee relationship, in which Save A Lot acts as a wholesaler to its independent store owners as opposed to a franchisor. Smaller, independent grocery retailers soon found the limited assortment model to be an effective defensive strategy against the larger chain supermarkets. With help from new licensees, in 1980 alone Save A Lot added 50 stores in the Mid-South region, and a warehouse in Jackson, Tennessee.

In 1984, Save A Lot purchased 75 similar format Jewel T stores and two distribution centers from Jewel in Florida and Pennsylvania. In 1987, Save A Lot was purchased by St. Louis-based food retailer and wholesaler Wetterau Inc, then owner of former sister stores Shop 'n Save.

=== Acquisition by SuperValu, 1994–2016 ===
In 1994, both the Save A Lot and Shop 'n Save banners became wholly owned subsidiaries of Supervalu Inc, one of the largest independent grocery wholesalers, and the owners of Cub Foods and Scott's Food & Pharmacy at the time. The acquisition opened up Save A Lot's licensee opportunities to conventional Supervalu-supplied operators, including Niemann Foods.

Save A Lot expanded into Southern California with the purchase of 21 discount-grocery Sav U Foods stores, and a distribution center from the Fleming Companies in late 1996.

In 2002, Save A Lot acquired discount variety store chain Deals with 45 stores in the Midwest. The typical Deal$ store had a slightly smaller footprint than Save A Lot and carried mostly non-food merchandise at dollar-increment price points. The Deal$ concept was expanded under Save A Lot to 138 stores by 2006. The acquisition also allowed Save A Lot grocery stores to stock more general merchandise in its grocery stores. The company experimented with hypermarkets which combined the discount grocery and merchandise concepts under one roof. This eventually led to 480 combination stores that did not carry the Deal$ banner. In 2006, Save A Lot sold Deal$ to Dollar Tree for $30.5 million plus inventory. Save A Lot reduced the amount of general merchandise in its combination stores and returned them to its grocery-focused model.

In 2009, Save A Lot expanded its presence internationally. In the Caribbean, Save A Lot opened the first three international licensee grocery stores in Aruba, Freeport- Bahamas and Dominica. Expansion continued with secondary locations opening in Aruba and 8 mile Rock-Bahamas. International interest and growth continued with additional stores opening in St. Vincent, Curaçao, Trinidad and Tobago- (Mount Hope and Diego Martin). From the Caribbean, expansion moved to Central America establishing the brand with the opening of two retail sites in Guatemala City. Grenada was the last international licensee scheduled opening. As of 2018, with the change of corporate ownership the overall corporate strategy shifted to focus all efforts on stateside store growth. The international retail licenses were dissolved and existing international accounts were converted to wholesale accounts. The international stores no longer operate under the Save A Lot brand name or Save A Lot Licensee agreement but as independent retailers.

In late 2009, newly hired Supervalu CEO Craig Herkert announced the goal to double the Save A Lot grocery store network to 2,400 locations within five years. The company opened nearly 100 stores in 2010 with a major focus on the Southeastern United States.

Save A Lot entered into a licensing affiliation with Hispanic grocer Rafael Ortega to rebrand six former Save A Lots in Houston, Texas, and South Texas as "El Ahorro Save A Lot". new stores featured Save A Lot product offerings along with more traditional Hispanic staples.

In late 2010, Rite Aid became a licensed Save A Lot operator when it converted 10 of its existing pharmacies in the Greenville, South Carolina, area to co-branded "Save A Lot/Rite Aid" units.

In September 2012, Supervalu announced it would close 22 Save A Lot stores in seven states. Several executive changes were made by Supervalu on March 4, 2013, including replacing Save-A-Lot CEO Roces with Ritchie Casteel. This came in the midst of plans by Supervalu to sell a number of its other grocery chains to Cerberus Capital Management.

=== Sale to Onex Corporation, 2016–2020 ===
In October 2016, SuperValu sold Save A Lot to Onex Corporation. In April 2020, Save A Lot completed a recapitalization of the business with the company's lenders that canceled approximately $500 million in debt and provided a $350 million capital infusion to the company. Save A Lot is now privately held by institutional investors.

=== Transition to wholesale model, 2020–2023 ===
In early 2020, Save-a-Lot began a financial restructuring towards a wholesale model in order to reduce its debt load. It sought to no longer operate its locations and instead license them off to independent retailers.

List of deals, 2020–2023
operator	date	stores
Fresh Encounter	Dec 2020	51 stores in the Tampa, Florida area
Yellow Banana (127 Wall Holdings)	Sep 2021	32 stores in Ohio, Illinois and Wisconsin
Ascend Grocery	Dec 2021	33 stores in the greater Orlando, Florida area
Ascend Grocery	Oct 2023	4 stores in Jacksonville
Leevers Supermarket	Dec 2023	18 stores in the St. Louis area

In August 2023, Save-a-Lot revealed that the remaining 18 stores that it operated directly were to be acquired by Leevers Supermarkets. Leevers is an employee-owned company that also operate Leevers Locavore, El Mercado De Colorado, and had already been operating 29 Save-a-Lots. As of February 2024, Leevers Supermarkets operated a total of 52 Save-a-Lots (14 in Colorado, 20 in the mid-Atlantic, and 18 in the greater St Louis area).

=== Corporate Fallout, 2026 ===
Save-a-Lot severed ties with franchisee Yellow Banana, putting seven Chicago stores on track to close July 25, 2026. The collapse followed the CEO's death, heavy debts, and a 26% drop in SNAP sales. The closures threaten a $13.5 million city grant meant to fight food deserts.
