= Hornbacher =

Hornbacher is a surname. Notable people with the surname include:

- Marya Hornbacher (born 1974), American writer and journalist
- Scott Hornbacher, American television producer and director

== See also ==
- Hornbacher's, an American supermarket chain
