= Total Logistic Control =

American supply chain company

- Industry: Supply Chain
- Predecessor: Taylor Cold Storage
- Founded: 1902
- Founder: George K. Taylor
- Headquarters: Holland, Michigan, United States
- Area served: United States
- Key people: Pete Westermann (CEO)
- Services: Transportation, Warehousing, Distribution and Contract Packaging
- Parent: SuperValu (United States)
- Website: https://www.totallogistic.com/

Total Logistic Control is a supply chain company started around 1902 by George K. Taylor.

The company began as a regional distributor known as Taylor Cold Storage, which operated frozen warehouse operations for other regional food companies in Great Lakes region. Around 1930, they merged with Wisconsin Cold Storage. In 1958, Taylor became the first public refrigerated warehouse to offer consolidated LTL distribution to its customers. In the 1960s, their total freezer capacity hit 10,000,000 cu ft (280,000 m^{3}). Taylor introduced TINMAN, the Total INformation MANagement system, in 1976, becoming the first firm in the industry to offer online inventory management.

In 1982, a flood wiped out the company warehouses, creating the opportunity to refocus the company on third-party logistics as Total Logistic Control. They achieved Foreign Trade Zone status in 1990.

Acquired by 'Christiana Companies, Inc' in 1994, the company went into a growth phase. Merging with Wiscold in 1996, starting a Logistics Management Services division in 1999, and then acquiring the ProSource Group in 2000 (offering turnkey facility design). In 2002, they purchased two over-the-road trucking companies of TSI and Birkmire Trucking; taking their fleet total to around 400 tractor-trailers.

They were acquired by SuperValu in 2005 and moved their corporate offices to Holland, MI in 2008. Today, TLC is a Source-to-Shelf supply chain company targeting the consumer goods supply chain. 97% of the products they touch end up in retail. Last year that was over 2 billion cases (CEs).
