= Seessel's =

Defunct American grocery store

Seessel's Supermarkets, Inc.
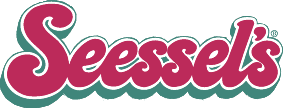
- Company type: Subsidiary of Albertsons
- Founded: 1858 (Memphis, Tennessee)
- Defunct: 2002
- Fate: sold to Schnucks in 2002
- Number of locations: 12
- Products: Upscale products

Seessel's Supermarkets was an upscale grocery chain in Memphis, Tennessee, owned by Albertsons, Inc. It was acquired by Schnucks in 2002, which rebranded the stores Schnucks.

== History ==
Seessel's was founded in 1858, when Henry Seessel opened a meat stand in downtown Memphis. The first Seessel's Supermarket opened on Union Avenue in 1941. In 1997, brothers Art and Jerry Seessel, the fifth generation of the family to operate the business, sold the supermarket to Alabama-based Bruno's Supermarkets. Bruno's struggled with the 10-store chain, and Seessels took back the stores before selling them to Idaho-based Albertsons, Inc. in 1999. In 2002, Albertsons sold the 12-store chain to Schnucks, which rebranded the stores.

In 2011, Schnucks left the Memphis market and sold the former Seessel's stores to Kroger.

== Sources ==
Art Seessel's short biography
