= SuperValu (United States) =

American wholesaler and retailer of grocery products

SuperValu, Inc.
- Type: Subsidiary
- Traded as: NYSE: SVU
- Industry: Retailing
- Founded: 1926; 100 years ago, in Minneapolis, Minnesota
- Defunct: October 22, 2018
- Fate: Acquired by United Natural Foods
- Successor: United Natural Foods
- Headquarters: Eden Prairie, Minnesota, U.S.
- Area served: United States
- Products: Supermarkets, grocery store, pharmacies, food
- Parent: United Natural Foods
- Subsidiaries: SuperValu Pharmacies. Cub Foods and Shoppers

SuperValu, Inc., was an American wholesaler and retailer of grocery products. The company, formerly headquartered in the Minneapolis suburb of Eden Prairie, Minnesota, had been in business since 1926. In 2018 it became a wholly owned subsidiary of United Natural Foods, Inc. (UNFI).

On July 26, 2018, SuperValu announced it had agreed to be purchased by Providence, RI-based United Natural Foods Inc., the largest distributor to Whole Foods Market and other natural foods stores. UNFI paid $1.3 billion in cash and assumed another $1.6 billion in SuperValu debt and liabilities. UNFI said it expected the deal to result in roughly $175 million in savings over three years and that it would divest itself of SuperValu's grocery stores.

As of June 8, 2022, the SuperValu brand has been discontinued for everything besides some small-scale “neighborhood” grocery stores that still bear the SuperValu name. The distribution facility in Hopkins, Minnesota, has been rebranded to UNFI.

== History ==
In 1870, Hugh G. Harrison provided the money for B.S. Bull and Company, a dry goods wholesaler serving Minneapolis. Though B.S. Bull and Company was short lived, its founders went on to create a similar company. In 1926, SuperValu's direct ancestor, Winston and Newell Company, was founded from the merger of Winston, Harper and Fisher and the Newell Company, two companies founded by B. S. Bull's backers.

Winston and Newell was a charter member of the Independent Grocers Alliance in 1928, but left IGA in 1942 in favor of forming a "virtual chain" of independently owned stores that operated under the SuperValu and U-Save banners. However, it still serves as a supplier to many IGA stores. This concept proved to be such a success that in 1952, the company changed its name to SuperValu Inc. The name was modified to SuperValu in 1992.

The company was first listed on the New York Stock Exchange in 1967.

=== Acquisitions ===
In 1955, SuperValu acquired Joannes Brothers Company of Green Bay, Wisconsin, a wholesale and retail grocer serving Wisconsin and northern Michigan since 1872. Joannes Brothers became SuperValu's Green Bay Division, moving from its original downtown Green Bay location to a modern facility in the city's suburbs.

In 1963, the company acquired the Food Marketing Corporation of Fort Wayne, Indiana, which traced its roots to the early 1800s, as Bursley & Company. The acquisition of Food Marketing brought SuperValu into the institutional market. George W. McKay, president of Food Marketing, joined SuperValu as an executive vice president and later as president and chief executive officer of SuperValu in 1970.

In 1971, SuperValu acquired the discount store chain ShopKo. It was spun off in 1991 to form a separate, publicly traded company. SuperValu retained a 46% interest in the new company, which Shopko later purchased in 1997.

In 1973, SuperValu founded the clothing store County Seat, and in 1983 sold it to Carson Pirie Scott.

In 1975, SuperValu acquired Hornbacher's.

In 1980, the company acquired Minnesota-based Cub Foods, which operated five stores in the Twin Cities area. As of 2011, Cub operated more than 73 stores in Minnesota and Illinois.

In the early 1990s, SuperValu started acquiring several chains such as Scott's Food & Pharmacy in 1991, Wetterau, Inc. and its holdings Shop 'n Save and Save-A-Lot in 1992, and Bigg's in 1994. Scotts & Biggs were subsequently divested. Biggs was sold to Remke Markets and Scotts to Kroger. SuperValu acquired Richfood Holdings for $1.5 billion, adding a Mid-Atlantic distribution presence and stores including Farm Fresh Food & Pharmacy, Shoppers Food & Pharmacy, and Metro.

In 2003, SuperValu acquired the former Midwest operations of Fleming Companies from C&S Wholesale Grocers, including the Sentry Foods and Festival Foods brands.

On January 23, 2006, SuperValu announced that it, along with CVS Corporation and a collection of investors led by Cerberus Group, agreed to acquire Albertsons, Inc. for $9.7 billion. The acquisition was completed on June 2, 2006.

SuperValu acquired over 1100 stores in the deal including:

- Acme (134 locations) (sold to Cerberus)
- Acme Express, Jewel Express, and Albertsons Express (107 fuel centers) (units were divested to various operators)
- Albertsons (564 locations) (sold to Cerberus)
- Bristol Farms (15 locations) (later sold off)
- Jewel and Jewel-Osco (198 locations sold to Cerberus)
- Lazy Acres Market (1 location) (later sold off)
- Max Foods (3 locations) (later rebranded Lucky)
- Osco Pharmacy and Sav-on Pharmacy (906 pharmacies) (Stand-alone stores sold to CVS)
- Save-A-Lot (2 locations franchised by Shaw's)
- Shaw's (188 locations) (sold to Cerberus)
- Star Market (20 locations) (7 re-branded Shaw's) (sold to Cerberus)

In 2009, former Walmart executive Craig Herkert took over from Jeff Noddle as CEO of SuperValu.

On January 6, 2011, SuperValu announced it would close 20 underperforming stores. On January 11, 2011, SuperValu reported a loss of $202 million for the quarter; revenue also fell 6% to $8.67 billion. SuperValu's share price fell 12 percent to $7.52 per share.

In September 2011, SuperValu announced the sale of all but 27 of its fuel centers to several convenience store chains, including Tesoro, Holiday Stationstores, Couche-Tard (which operates Circle K Stores), and Stinker Stores. The company announced it would seek buyers for the remaining fuel centers too.

In 2012, SuperValu operated 2,505 food and food/drug combination stores, 878 in-store pharmacies, and 117 fuel centers and served as primary distributor to an additional 2,200 stores. SuperValu also supplied a network of independent retailers (often found in smaller cities) that sometimes use the SuperValu name. However, these stores were not owned by the company. SuperValu also franchised the Cub Foods and Save-A-Lot brands to independent retailers. The company operated on a strategy of effective and efficient food distribution, conducting its retail food operations through a total of 2,349 retail food stores that were supplied by 32 distribution centers.

On July 11, 2012, after the close of the market hours, SuperValu reported net sales of $10.6 billion and net earnings of $41 million for the first quarter of fiscal year 2013, compared to net sales of $11.1 billion and net earnings for $74 million for the year-earlier period. Those results sent SuperValu shares down some 45% after the start of trading on July 12, 2012, and hurt performance of other outstanding SuperValu debt, including its high yield bonds and CDS (credit default swap).

On July 30, 2012, Craig Herkert was let go as CEO of SuperValu, replaced with Wayne Sales.

In January 2013, the company announced it was selling the Acme Markets, Shaw's, and Jewel-Osco chains and their remaining Albertsons stores to Cerberus Capital Management for $100 million in cash with Cerberus assuming $3.2 billion in existing debt. SuperValu would keep its Cub, Farm Fresh, Shoppers Food & Pharmacy and Shop ‘n Save brands as well as its wholesale supply operation while the Acme, Shaw's, Star Market, and Jewel-Osco stores were reunited with Albertsons. The deal closed March 21, 2013. On March 14, 2018 Supervalu announced it would be closing 21 of its 38 Farm Fresh locations, selling 18 to Kroger and 3 to Food Lion.

On January 13, 2013, Sam Duncan, who had retired as CEO of OfficeMax in 2011, was named CEO of SuperValu. Duncan announced his retirement in October 2015.

In July 2016, it was announced that SuperValu had entered into a purchase agreement with Ahold and Delhaize Group for 22 Food Lion locations in Maryland, Pennsylvania, Virginia and West Virginia as part of the divestiture of stores to gain clearance from the Federal Trade Commission for the Ahold/Delhaize merger. The 22 stores were rebranded under the Shop ‘n Save retail banner.

On February 3, 2016, Mark Gross was named CEO of SuperValu, replacing Sam Duncan.

In October 2016, SuperValu announced they were selling Save-A-Lot to Onex Corporation.

In April 2017, the company announced that it had entered into a $375 million merger agreement with Unified Grocers, based in Commerce, California, in which Unified Grocers would become a wholly owned subsidiary of SuperValu when the merger is completed. The deal was expected to be finalized in late summer 2017, with the merger process then taking about two years to implement. Later in 2017, SuperValu acquired Associated Grocers of Florida.

=== Sale ===
On July 26, 2018, United Natural Foods agreed to buy Supervalu for $2.9 billion in cash. On October 22, 2018, UNFI completed the acquisition of Supervalu. Sean Griffin was named the CEO of Supervalu, replacing Mark Gross.

== Overview ==
SuperValu brands included:

- Arctic Shores
- Baby Basics
- Carlita
- Culinary Circle
- Equaline
- Essential Everyday
- Farm Fresh
- Farm Stand
- Flavorite
- WholeCare Pet
- Homelife
- Java Delight
- Max Velocity
- NutriPlan
- Richfood
- Shoppers Value
- Stockman & Dakota
- Stone Ridge Creamery
- SuperChill
- SuperCrunch
- Wild Harvest

SuperValu also owns two third-party logistics firms, Advantage Logistics and Total Logistic Control. In 2005, SuperValu launched a specialty produce company, W. Newell & Company which is headquartered in Champaign, Illinois.

== Chains ==
At the time of its acquisition by United Natural Foods in 2018, the company operated under multiple retail banners, or chains:

- County Market over 100 locations independently owned (Iowa, Illinois, Indiana, Louisiana, Michigan, Minnesota, Missouri, Mississippi, Pennsylvania, Washington, and Wisconsin)
- Cub Foods 77 locations of which 31 are franchised (Minneapolis-St. Paul, MN and IL.)
- Festival Foods licensed locations in Wisconsin, Minnesota, and Michigan.
- FoodLand licensed locations in Pennsylvania, West Virginia, Ohio and Kentucky.
- Sentry Foods 6 licensed locations in Wisconsin
- Shoppers Food & Pharmacy 56 locations (Washington, D.C., Baltimore, MD and Northern VA)
- Shoppers Value Foods licensed cost-plus supermarkets
- SuperValu Pharmacies 109 pharmacies (Nationwide)

=== Former chains ===
SuperValu had previously operated other chains:

- Acme Markets 117 locations (DE, Eastern & Northern MD, NJ, Eastern PA) Sold to Albertsons LLC
- Albertsons 453 locations (Southern CA, ID, MT, ND, southern NV, OR, UT, WA and WY) Sold to Albertsons LLC
- Acme Express, Albertsons Express and Jewel Express (nationwide) Fuel centers and convenience stores - sold in 2011 to various operators
- bigg's (Cincinnati, OH; Clarksville, IN; and Florence, KY) Locations sold to Remke Markets in 2010
- Bristol Farms (Southern California) Spun off in 2010
- Farm Fresh Food & Pharmacy (Norfolk, Virginia) In 2018, 21 locations sold to The Kroger Co. and Ahold Delhaize and converted to their existing brands, 6 locations were bought by independent franchisers, and the remaining locations closed.
- Hornbacher's (Fargo-Moorhead/Grand Forks, ND/MN) 8 locations with 7 of those locations were sold to Coborns in 2018, the remaining location was in Grand Forks, North Dakota, and closed.
- Lazy Acres (owned by Bristol Farms)
- Max Foods (Southern California) Locations rebranded Lucky
- Jewel-Osco 182 locations in IL, eastern IA, northwestern IN and southeastern WI Sold to Albertsons LLC
- Lucky Stores 5 locations (Las Vegas and Southern CA) Sold to Albertsons LLC
- Osco Pharmacy and Sav-on Pharmacy 722 pharmacies (Nationwide) Sold to Albertsons LLC
- Rainbow Foods (Minnesota) Closed in 2018
- Save-A-Lot 1250 locations of which 860 were franchised (Nationwide) Sold to Onex Corporation
- Scott's Food & Pharmacy (Fort Wayne, IN and Northeastern IN) Sold to The Kroger Co. in 2007
- Shop 'n Save (St. Louis, MO, Southern IL and Springfield, IL) Sold 19 locations to Schnuck Markets, Inc. Those 19 stores were converted to Schnucks stores. SuperValu closed the remaining locations on November 19, 2018 after SuperValu couldn't find a buyer for the remaining locations.
- Shop 'n Save (Pittsburgh) (Pittsburgh-based), sold off to independent owners who collectively manage the brand. Not to be confused with the former St. Louis-area Shop 'n Save stores, though they had a common Shop ‘n Save private label.
- ShopKo Spun off in 1991, remaining interest sold in 1997
- Shaw's and Star Market 169 locations (MA, ME, NH, RI and VT) Sold to Albertsons LLC.
- Sunflower Market (Indianapolis) Five locations closed in 2008
- Twin Valu (Ohio) Hypermarket concept, closed in 1996

== Product labels ==
Many of the banners had "private labels". These included:

- Arctic Shores - Seafood products.
- Baby Basics - Baby products (originally an Albertsons brand)
- Carlita - Hispanic foods
- Cub - Store generic brand
- Culinary Circle - Restaurant quality food
- Essential Everyday - Private Label National Brand Equivalent
- Equaline - OTC Pharmacy and Personal Care National Brand Equivalent (originally an Albertsons brand)
- Farm Fresh - Store generic brand
- Farm Stand - Produce
- Flavorite - Brand used at non-East Coast stores
- Happy Tails (now Whole Care Pet) - Line of pet foods. (originally an Albertsons brand)
- Heritage - Liquors
- Java Delight - Supervalu's own brand of coffee, is sourced from Distant Lands Coffee
- Max Velocity - Energy Drinks
- NutriPlan - Pet Foods
- Richfood - Brand used at East Coast stores
- Shoppers Value - Extreme value generic brand
- Stockman & Dakota - Premium beef
- Stone Ridge Creamery - Ice cream, frozen yogurt and sherbet
- Wild Harvest - Organic Produce, Meat and Snack Foods (originally a Shaw’s brand)
- SuperChill - Soft Drinks and New Age Beverages
- SuperCrunch - Snack Foods
- Village Market
- Wild Harvest Organic Foods - Natural and organic products

Some of the older inactive private label brands were:

- Hillfarm
- Economy Buy
- HomeBest/Aloft
- Essensia (originally an Albertsons brand)
- Chateau
- Quality Plus
- Elf

== Culture ==
SuperValu received a 100% rating on the Corporate Equality Index released by the Human Rights Campaign starting in 2008.

Cub Foods and its parent company, SuperValu, was the first grocer in Minnesota to be awarded LEED (Leadership in Energy and Environmental Design) Gold NC2.2 Certification for one of its stores. The Cub store, located in the Phalen neighborhood of St. Paul is one of just three grocery stores in the nation to successfully achieve LEED Gold Certification.

Albertsons was the first major retailer to earn a LEED Certification on their remodeled La Habra store. It features water saving faucets, over 40 skylights, "Night" curtains over open cold cases and LED lighting.

In August 2009, SuperValu was recognized by the U.S. Environmental Protection Agency for achieving their emissions target.

== Accounting irregularities and practices in 2002 ==
In June 2002, SuperValu announced it would restate previous financial reports due to accounting irregularities uncovered at its pharmacy division. As a result, shares of the company slumped 18 percent. On July 12, 2002, SuperValu lost a lawsuit over the use of improper accounting practices regarding the cost of goods sold for at least the previous four years, and paid a $4,000,000 settlement.

== See also ==
- Grocer
- List of supermarket chains in the United States
- List of S&P 500 companies
- List of companies based in Minneapolis–Saint Paul
- George R. Newell House (Minneapolis, Minnesota)
