= Shop 'n Save (Pittsburgh) =

Grocery store chain in Pennsylvania, US

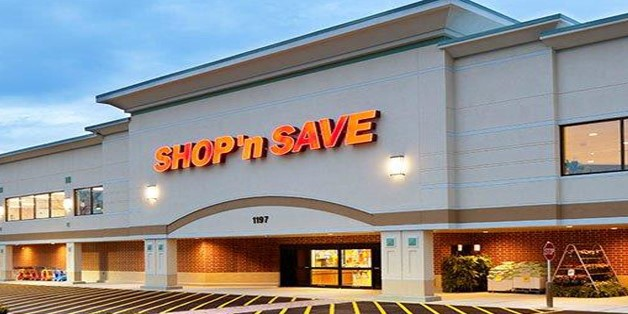
- Type: Private
- Industry: Retail, Grocery
- Founded: 1968; 58 years ago
- Headquarters: Pittsburgh, Pennsylvania, U.S.
- Number of locations: 74 Stores (August 2024)
- Area served: Western Pennsylvania, Western New York, Eastern Ohio, Maryland, West Virginia
- Products: Bakery, dairy, deli, frozen foods, grocery, meat, pharmacy, produce, seafood, prepared foods, snacks, in-store banking, money center
- Website: www.shopnsavefood.com

Shop 'n Save Supermarkets (stylized as SHOP 'N SAVE) is a discount grocery store headquartered in Pittsburgh, Pennsylvania, United States. The brand has around 70 different stores in the Mid-Atlantic, each locally owned and operated.

== History ==
Shop 'n Save was established in 1968 as one of the nation's first discount grocery stores, Shop 'n Save offers name-brand and private label products. The stores are supplied by the distributor UNFI, which licenses the name. SuperValu entered the Pittsburgh market in 1977 by acquiring wholesaler Charley Brothers. The Charley family continue to be Shop 'n Save licensees.

Shop 'n Save offers customers a loyalty card program. Using the Perks Card to make purchases at Shop 'n Save enables customers to earn discounts on fuel at participating Sunoco and SHOP 'n SAVE Express fuel stations, take advantage of special deals on groceries at Shop 'n Save, and download selected manufacturer’s coupons directly to their Perks Card. Shop 'n Save also offers a mobile program that allows customers to receive alerts, offers, and promotions on their mobile phone.

In March 2010, Shop 'n Save launched an online cookbook called Our Kitchen Stories. The cookbook is geared at recording the recipes and culinary traditions of people of the Western Pennsylvania, Eastern Ohio, and Northern West Virginia region.

In 2017, as part of the required divestitures for the merger of Royal Ahold and Delhaize Group, a number of Delhaize-owned Food Lion locations in West Virginia, Virginia, Pennsylvania, and Maryland that were located in close proximity to Ahold-owned Martin's stores were sold to Supervalu and rebranded as Shop 'n Save. These stores operate independently from the legacy stores based in the Pittsburgh area.
