= Remke Markets =

American supermarket

Remke Markets Inc.
- Type: Private
- Industry: Retail (Grocery)
- Founded: 1897 (129 years ago) in Covington, Kentucky
- Founder: William Remke
- Headquarters: Erlanger, Kentucky, U.S.
- Number of locations: 5
- Area served: Metro Cincinnati
- Products: Bakery, dairy, deli, frozen foods, general grocery, meat, pharmacy, produce, seafood, snacks, liquor
- Number of employees: 100+ (2019)
- Parent: Fresh Encounter (2017-present)
- Website: www.remkes.com

Remke Markets is a chain of American supermarkets in the Cincinnati metropolitan area.

== History ==
Previous logo styling

Remke Markets was founded in 1897 as a meat market in Covington, Kentucky, by William Remke, the supermarket has grown and now has 6 locations.

The supermarket merged with the struggling Bigg's division of SuperValu in 2010. On February 24, 2017, Remke Markets announced that it would be acquired by Generative Growth, LLC and managed by affiliated company Fresh Encounter, Inc. post-acquisition.

On November 3, 2018, Remke announced that they would shutter two underperforming locations, one in the Skytop Pavilion shopping center in Anderson Township, and the other on Delhi Pike in Delhi Township by the end of that month. The closing of its Hebron, Kentucky store was announced on March 4, 2019. This closing left six locations operating under the Remke Markets banner.

== bigg's ==
Simplified Bigg's Logo

Original bigg's logo

Bigg's (branded as bigg's) was a chain of hypermarkets in southern Ohio, primarily in the Cincinnati area.

As a hypermarket, in addition to groceries it sold clothing, general merchandise, lumber, shoes, bedding, furniture, jewelry, beauty products, electronics, toys, garden supplies and housewares.

It was founded by Hyper Shoppes Inc., a firm owned by three French companies and SuperValu, which bought the entirety of the company in 1994. They used to operate over 13 bigg's stores, but later pared it down to eleven.

In 1984, Bigg's opened their first location in the Eastgate mall area of Union Township, a suburb of Cincinnati. Bigg's attempted an expansion into the western United States in 1989 with a 250,000 sq ft (23,000 m^{2}) location in the Denver, Colorado, suburb of Thornton. Initially it was successful and popular, and was an anchor of the Thornton Town Center. Plans for further Denver metropolitan area locations (and ultimately the western U.S.) were discussed but never realized. Over time the Thornton location became less popular and shrank in size, and ultimately ceased operation in 2003. After its demise, it was demolished as part of a redevelopment of the center, and a 200,000 sq ft (19,000 m^{2}) Walmart Supercenter was built on its former site.

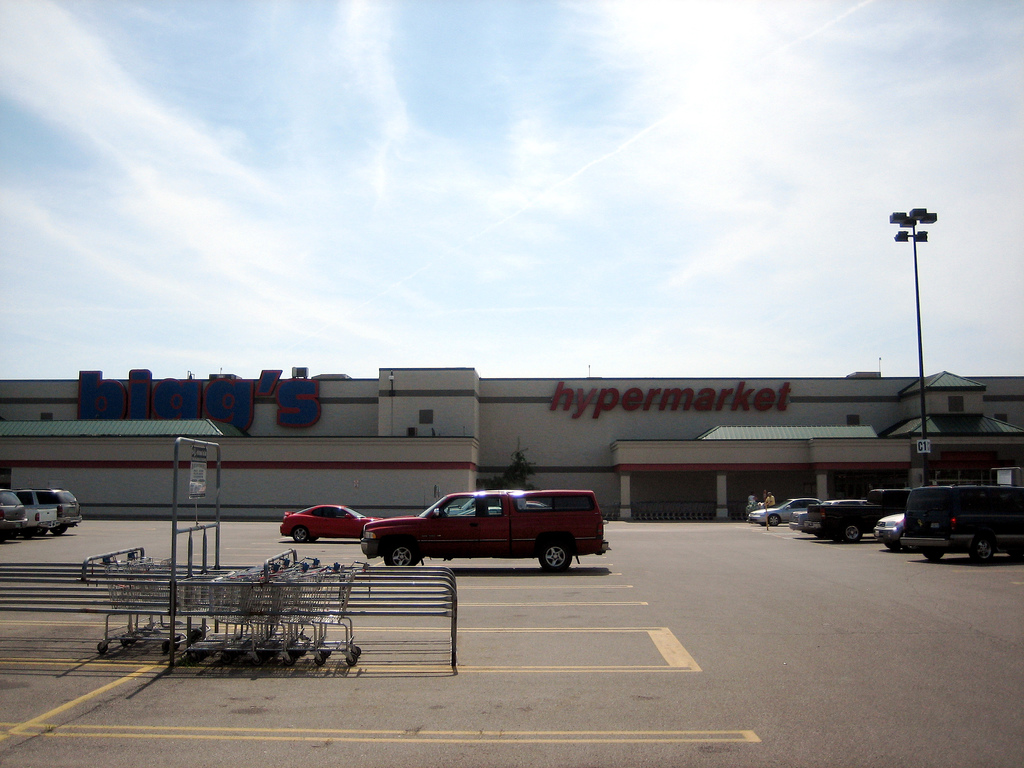
Former Bigg's in Mason, Ohio. This site was a Remke Markets bigg's until 2012 and is currently a Hobby Lobby.

In 1994, Bigg's, with seven locations, was acquired by SuperValu.

In 2006, the company closed its Clarksville, Indiana, location, the company's only location in Indiana. The Clarksville store, unlike the typical bigg's, was a grocery only store. The company has been facing financial losses due to increasing competition with other brands such as Walmart, Meijer and Kroger.

In 2006, SuperValu appointed Steve "KAZ" Kaczynski President of bigg's. Since then, Kaczynski has taken over five stores that have been remodeled to their new Premium, Fresh & Healthy formats, that have proved to be highly successful and profitable.

In June 2008, Biggs closed their Cincinnati Mills location due to declining sales. It was the mall's largest tenant.

In 2009, Kaczynski left, and on March 29, 2010, SuperValu announced that it would be selling six Bigg's locations to Remke Markets and would close the remaining five.

On April 8, Remke announced it would be buying a seventh store in Harrison that had been scheduled to close. Remke said that the stores it purchases would retain the Bigg's brand immediately after the transfer, but they may make changes in the future.

The stores not purchased were closed in June 2010. The Bigg's in Eastgate closed and became a second location of Jungle Jim's International Market. The remaining Bigg's were renovated to remove the general merchandise (in the stores that had them) and were renamed Remke Markets bigg's.

In October 2013, it was announced that the Remke bigg's banner would be dropped and all Remke bigg's locations would assume the Remke Markets banner.
