= Shop 'n Save =

Defunct American supermarket

- Company type: Subsidiary
- Industry: Retail
- Founded: 1979 (47 years ago)
- Defunct: November 19, 2018
- Fate: Closed after parent company was unable to sell
- Headquarters: Kirkwood, Missouri, U.S.
- Products: Bakery, dairy, deli, frozen foods, grocery, meat, pharmacy, produce, seafood, snacks, liquor
- Parent: SuperValu
- Website: Archived official website at the Wayback Machine (archive index)

Shop ’n Save was a grocery store chain in the Greater St. Louis market with 36 stores at its peak. The company, headquartered in Kirkwood, Missouri, was a wholly owned subsidiary of SuperValu, based in Eden Prairie, Minnesota.

SuperValu also licenses the Shop ’n Save name to 90 stores in Western Pennsylvania, Eastern Ohio, West Virginia, and Maryland. These stores are supplied through the SuperValu Wholesale division. In July 2016, Supervalu purchased 22 Food Lion locations in Maryland, Pennsylvania, West Virginia, and Virginia. These stores would not be a part of SuperValu’s corporately owned Shop 'n Save retail banner and they planned to offer these stores to their wholesale customers to operate. In August 2018, it was announced that 13 of the formerly purchased Food Lion locations would be closed in September 2018. On November 19th, 2018, all remaining Shop 'n Save locations closed.

== History ==
Shop ’n Save was founded in 1979 as a grocery store in Belleville, Illinois. The chain included 33 stores in Greater St. Louis, and 3 additional stores in Springfield, Illinois.

The chain was acquired by Ted Wetterau in 1982. In 1992, Wetterau Inc. was acquired by SuperValu, and Shop ’n Save has been a subsidiary of SuperValu ever since.

Shop 'n Save largely operated as a "hybrid" of a full-service grocery like its St. Louis-area competitors, Schnucks and Dierbergs, and discount grocers such as Aldi. Like a full-service store, its stores had a large square footprint and included a deli, butcher, large liquor section, and pharmacy, but like a discount grocer its furnishings were much more spartan, a substantial portion of its items for sale were private-label, and shoppers bagged their own purchases (though unlike at some discount supermarkets paper and plastic bags are provided free of charge).

In December 2007, the Wood River, IL, location opened the chain's first Fuel Express Center, and later added a second one in Alton, IL, in March 2008. Along with the fuel pumps, Shop 'n Save also started offering a fuel rewards program in January 2008. It allowed customers to save up to 9 cents per gallon, depending on how much they spend on groceries.

In April 2018, SuperValu announced it was pursuing the sale of corporately owned Shop ’n Save stores in the St. Louis market as well as 21 of the former Food Lion locations it purchased in 2016. On September 18, 2018, SuperValu announced it was selling 19 of its locations to Schnucks Markets with the remaining locations to be closed by November 19.

== See also ==
- Schnucks
- Dierbergs
- Save-A-Lot
- Aldi
- Trader Joe's
