= Wayne Sales =

Canadian business executive (born 1949)

- Born: 28 December 1949 (age 75); Lynchburg, Virginia
- Education: Central Virginia Community College (1970)

Wayne Carlyle Sales (born December 28, 1949) is an American-Canadian business executive and the former chief executive officer of Canadian Tire Corp. Ltd. He held position from August 2000 to May 2006. Prior to this, he held the position of executive VP at Canadian Tire Retail. In May 2006, Sales was replaced by Tom Gauld.

In 2004, the Retail Council of Canada recognized Sales' accomplishments in leading Canadian Tire to outstanding business success. In recognition of this feat he was presented with the Distinguished Canadian Retailer of the Year Award.

Sales was named the top Canadian CEO in Canadian Business magazine's 2005 All-Star Execs list, which was published in the April 25 – May 8, 2005 issue.

He is currently on the board of SuperValu.

SuperValu announced on July 30, 2012, that Wayne C. Sales has been named president and CEO, replacing Craig R. Herkert. Sales will continue to serve as chairman of the Board.

Mill's Fleet Farm announced on January 5, 2016, that Wayne Sales was named Interim CEO after CEO Duncan Mac Naughton stepped down to take over as CEO at Dollar Tree.
