= Niemann Foods =

American retail company

Niemann Foods, Inc.
- Type: Employee-Owned
- Industry: Retail
- Founded: Quincy, Illinois (1917)
- Number of locations: 100+ (January 2016)
- Area served: Illinois, Indiana, Missouri, Iowa, & Wisconsin
- Number of employees: 4,000
- Website: www.niemanns.com

Niemann Foods, Inc. (NFI) is a company headquartered in Quincy, Illinois, United States, that owns and operates over 100 supermarkets, pharmacies, convenience, pet and hardware stores mostly under the County Market, County Market Express, Harvest Market, Cenex One-Stop, Haymakers, ACE Hardware, Pet Supplies Plus, and Save-A-Lot banners in Illinois, Indiana, Iowa, and Missouri. The regional grocery store operator is growing and expanding market share in the Central Illinois, Indiana and Missouri. The employee-owned, family-run company was founded in 1917 by brothers Ferd and Steve Niemann and is currently headed by Rich Niemann, Jr.

== History ==
It was 1917 when Ferd Niemann, Sr. and Steve Niemann opened their first grocery store. By 1930, they were operating 10 corner grocery stores and a wholesale business. In 1940 Niemann Foods, Inc. introduced the first full-service supermarket to Quincy, Illinois.

Niemann Foods' Save-A-Lot stores offer a limited assortment of groceries at discount prices while County Market stores are conventional grocery stores. NFI opened its first Harvest Market grocery store in Champaign, Illinois, in October 2016. This new concept store is not only a grocery store with a deli, bakery and coffee shop, but also features a restaurant, bar and educational cooking area. The first ValuCheck grocery store opened in Pekin in May 2016 and is a cost-plus format. NFI opened its second ValuCheck store in Champaign in December 2016.

== Supermarket affiliates ==
- Niemanns (grocery store)
- County Market
- County Market Health Mart (Pharmacy)
- Save A Lot
- ACE Hardware
- Pet Supplies Plus
- County Market Express (gas stations)
- Harvest Market (premium grocery store)
- Haymakers (gas stations)
- ValuCheck (Grocery)

== See also ==
- SuperValu, Inc.
