= Sunflower Market =

American grocery store chain

- Company type: Grocery
- Industry: Retail
- Founded: 2006
- Headquarters: Eden Prairie, Minnesota
- Products: Bakery, dairy, deli, frozen foods, general grocery, meat, pharmacy, produce, seafood, snacks, liquor

Sunflower Market was a grocery store chain with five stores in the Midwestern United States. The company was a wholly owned subsidiary of Eden Prairie, Minnesota-based SuperValu. Sunflower Market which operated five stores planned to open fifty stores in five years. Stores were located in the Chicago area (1), Indianapolis (1), and Columbus, Ohio (3).

In late January, 2008, SuperValu announced that it would close all five Sunflower Market stores.

All 5 stores are closed as of February 2008.
