= Osgood, North Dakota =

Coordinates: 46°48′49″N 96°53′28″W

Osgood was a city in Cass County, North Dakota in the United States. The city was located on the east side of the Sheyenne River, three miles south of West Fargo. Osgood was founded in 1884 as "Garfield" (named in honor of the recently assassinated President James A. Garfield). The name was changed to "Osgood", in honor of the landowner who ceded the site to C.C. Furnberg, who located a country store and post office at the town site. The post office and country store ceased operations in 1953. Furnberg's son, Oscar, donated the store to the Cass County Historical Society, where it was restored and put on display at the Bonanzaville, USA pioneer village museum. Today, Osgood is no longer a city. Instead, the general vicinity of Osgood is now a neighborhood of Fargo, North Dakota, centered on a golf course. The course and neighborhood still bear the "Osgood" name. Many roads in the neighborhood, such as Fernberg Place and Houkum Court, were named after families who originally lived in the town. Pictures of the former town can be found in the Osgood Golf Course clubhouse and in the Osgood Hornbacher's supermarket.
