= Festival Foods =

Grocery store chain operating in Wisconsin, United States

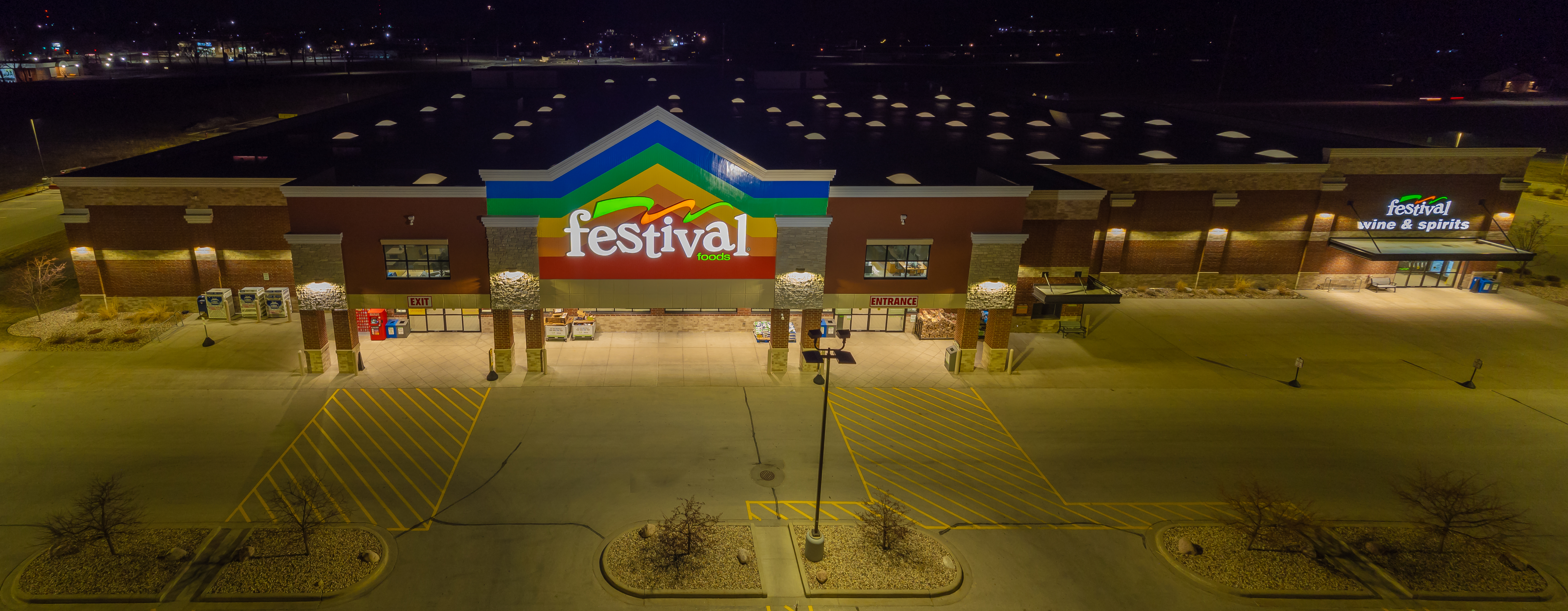
- Type: Private
- Industry: Grocery
- Predecessor: Skogen's IGA
- Founded: 1946; 80 years ago
- Founder: Paul Skogen; Jane Skogen
- Headquarters: De Pere, Wisconsin, USA
- Number of locations: 42
- Area served: Wisconsin
- Key people: Todd Schnuck (CEO)
- Products: Meat, Seafood, Deli, Catering, Food Court, Coffee, Bakery, Produce, Natural and Organic, Wine and Spirits, Dairy, Frozen Foods, General Grocery, General Merchandise, Floristry, Paczki
- Revenue: $47.1M (2023)
- Owner: 1939 Group Inc.
- Number of employees: 8,000+ (2024)
- Website: Official website

Festival Foods is an American supermarket chain operating throughout Wisconsin.

Founded in 1946 by Paul and Jane Skogen as Skogen's IGA in Onalaska, Wisconsin, the company remained under family ownership until its sale to the 1939 Group in 2025. Festival Foods’ private-label products are supplied by United Natural Foods. Festival Foods sponsors and supports charitable programs in their local communities.

Festival Foods is an American supermarket chain that operates numerous retail grocery locations throughout the state of Wisconsin. Originally founded in 1946 by Paul and Jane Skogen as a family-owned neighborhood store, the company expanded over the decades into a major regional presence before its transition to corporate ownership under The 1939 Group in 2025. Today, the brand remains a prominent fixture in Wisconsin's retail landscape, offering private-label goods supplied by UNFI alongside localized community sponsorship initiatives.

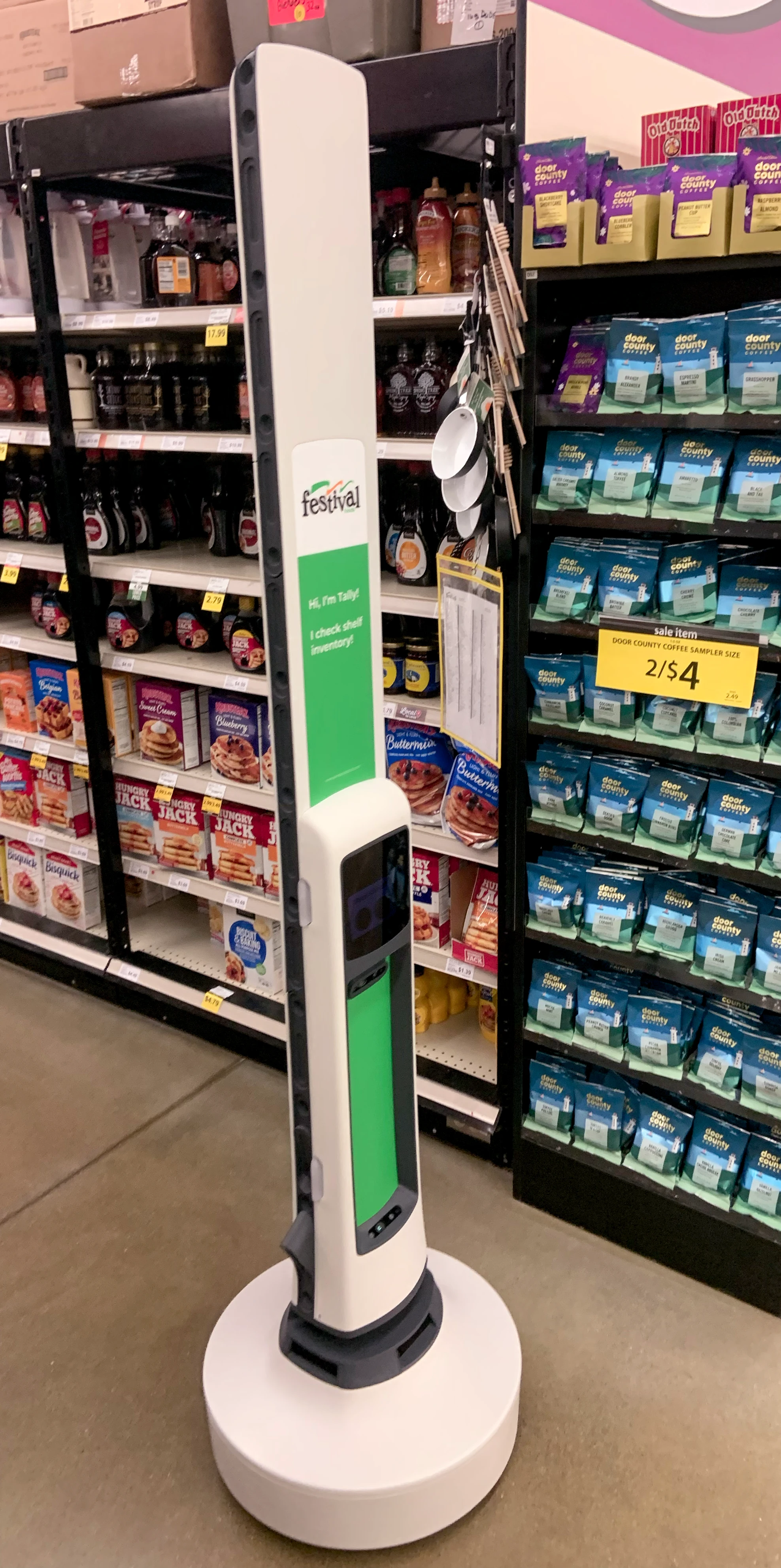
Tally scanning robot at Festival Foods

== History ==
In 1946, Paul and Jane Skogen opened Skogen’s IGA with an initial investment of $500. Paul’s son, Dave Skogen, assumed leadership of the company in 1976, and in 1979 the family acquired the Red Owl store in Holmen, Wisconsin. Festival Foods opened its first store in Onalaska, Wisconsin, in 1991, using the name under license from SuperValu.

Dave Skogen was named Grocer of the Year by the Wisconsin Grocers Association in 2005 for his leadership of the company. His son, Mark Skogen, became CEO in 2006 and later received the same Grocer of the Year honor in 2014. In 2021, the company announced plans to open two additional locations in the Milwaukee area.

=== Road sign controversy ===
In December 2016, Festival was sued by Metcalfe Inc., which operates three grocery stores in Wisconsin, over the use of Festival's "Road Sign Marks", which both Festival and Metcalfe used to promote local products. Metcalfe accused Festival of "intentional, deliberate and willful" violations of trademark laws, since Metcalfe applied for a trademark on its "Wisconsin Food Miles" road sign as compared to Festival's "Locally Grown" road sign. Festival said that "it would fight the suit".

=== Weight violation and labeling error ===
In September 2019, Festival Foods was fined $32,016 by the state Department of Agriculture, Trade and Consumer Protection for labeling errors. The company had 39 weight violations and two labeling errors that the state department found in seven Wisconsin stores based on legal documents filed in Eau Claire County Court.

== Subsidiaries ==
In 2010, Festival Foods purchased the Apple Creek Inn of De Pere and renamed it The Marq. The Marq is a 550-seat banquet and catering facility. In 2013, Festival added a second Marq location in Suamico. On May 19, 2020, Festival announced the closure of the Marq due to the COVID-19 pandemic.

== Acquisition by Schnuck Markets ==
In 2025, Schnuck Markets' parent company, The 1939 Group, acquired Skogen's Festival Foods, including all 42 Festival Foods stores in Wisconsin. Festival Foods will retain its brand name and continue to operate from its Onalaska, Wisconsin headquarters as a sister company to Schnucks under the 1939 Group umbrella.

== Locations ==
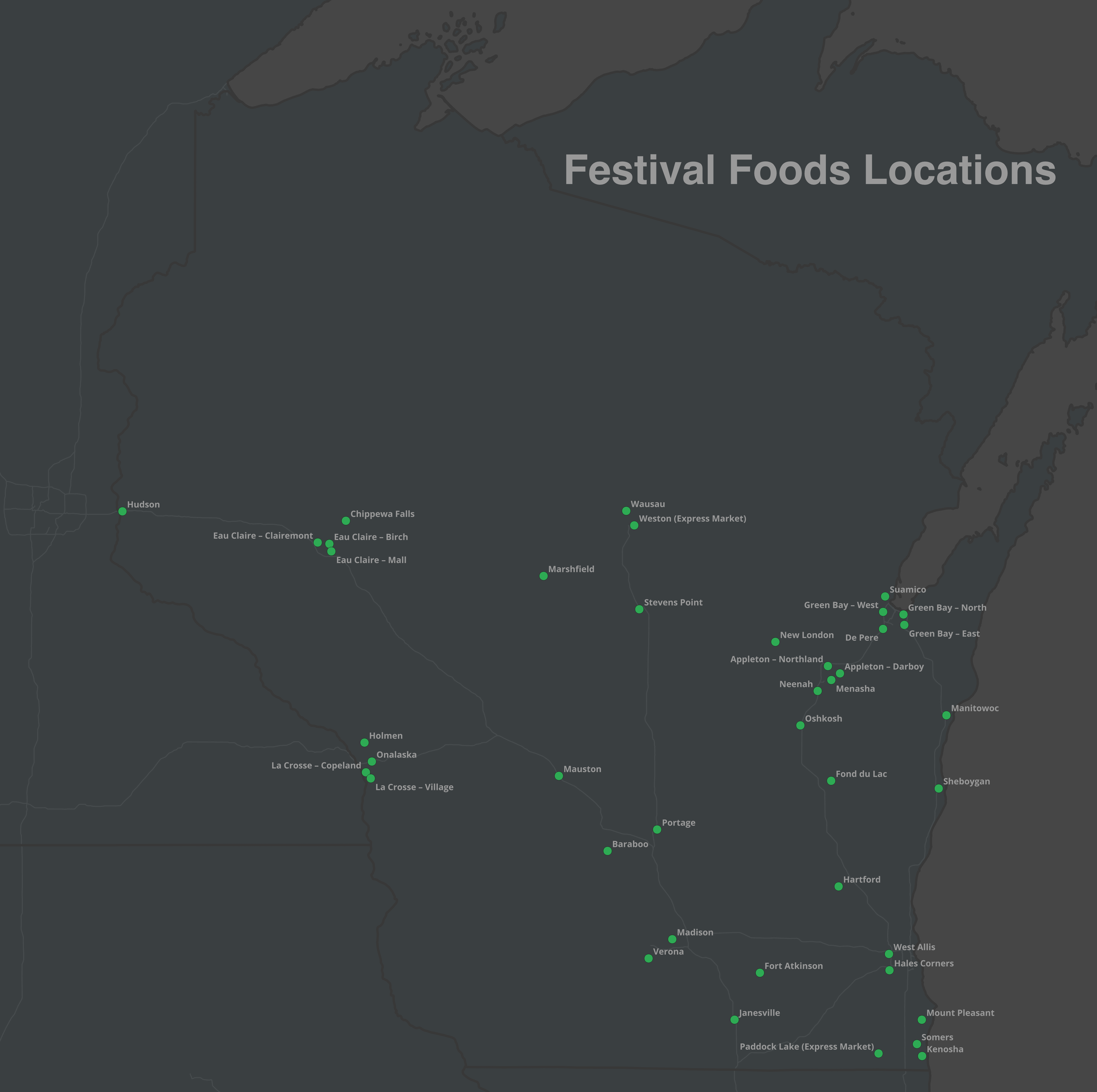
Festival Foods locations

| Location | Note | Reference |
|---|---|---|
| Appleton – Darboy | | |
| Appleton – Northland | | |
| Baraboo | | |
| Chippewa Falls | | |
| De Pere | | |
| Eau Claire – Birch | | |
| Eau Claire – Clairemont | | |
| Eau Claire – Mall | | |
| Fond du Lac | | |
| Fort Atkinson | | |
| Green Bay – East | | |
| Green Bay – North | | |
| Green Bay – West | | |
| Greenfield | Closed 2024 | |
| Hales Corners | | |
| Hartford | | |
| Hudson | | |
| Holmen | | |
| Janesville | | |
| Kenosha | | |
| Kimberly | Opened 2024 | |
| La Crosse – Copeland | | |
| La Crosse – Village | | |
| Madison | | |
| Manitowoc | | |
| Marshfield | | |
| Mauston | | |
| Menasha | | |
| Mount Pleasant | | |
| Neenah | | |
| New London | | |
| Onalaska | | |
| Oshkosh | | |
| Paddock Lake | Express Market | |
| Portage | | |
| Sheboygan | | |
| Somers | | |
| Stevens Point | | |
| Suamico | | |
| Verona | | |
| Wausau | | |
| West Allis | | |
| Weston | Express Market | |

== Corporate governance ==
=== Corporate headquarters ===
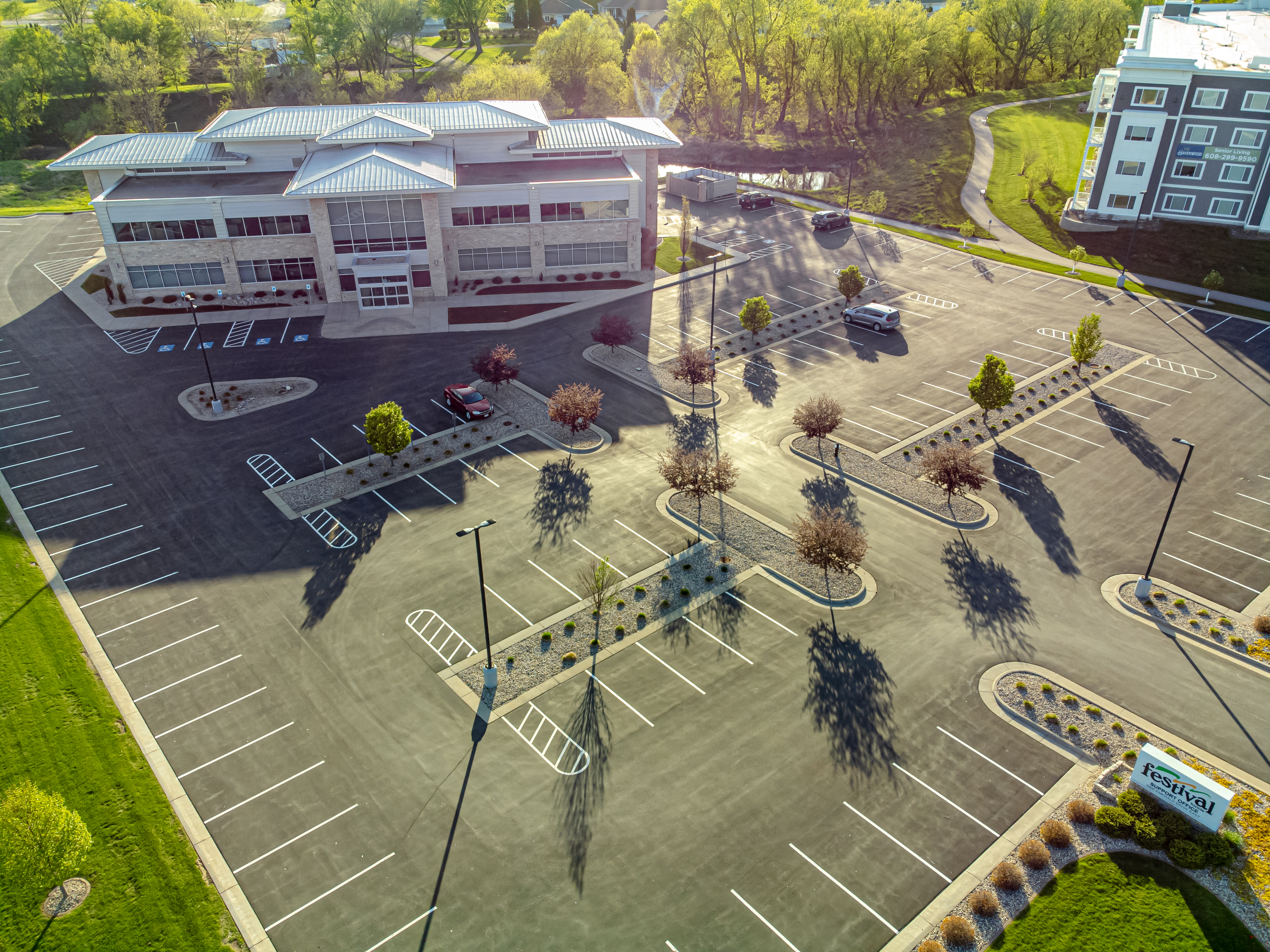
Festival Foods support office Onalaska, Wisconsin

In September 2015, Festival announced plans for a new corporate headquarters facility in De Pere, Wisconsin. Festival Foods also maintains a support office in Onalaska, Wisconsin.

=== Charitable giving ===
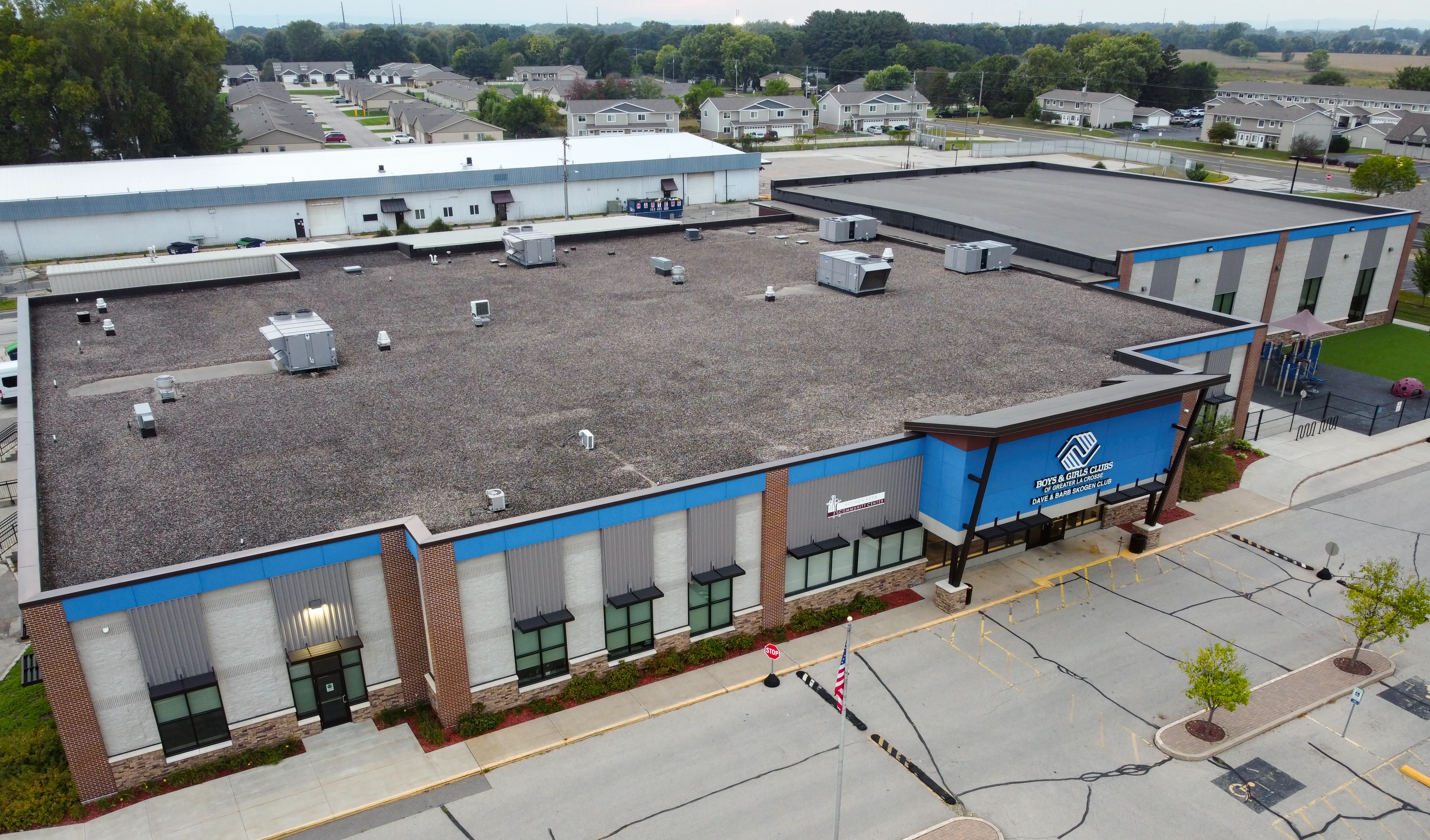
Old Holmen Festival Foods building was donated to the Boys & Girls Club

Sponsor of the annual fireworks show in 18 Wisconsin cities, the company also hosts the Turkey Trot, a 2-and-5-mile (3.2 and 8.0 km) walk/run that takes place on Thanksgiving in ten communities in Wisconsin. Proceeds from the event go to the YMCA and the Boys and Girls Clubs of America.

Festival Foods also sponsors the Green Bay Marathon, Lifest, and Grocers on the Green Golf Outing. In 2021, it partnered with Hormel Foods to donate 7,000 lbs of ham to help feed homeless people in Milwaukee.
