= Festival Foods (Minnesota) =

American grocery store chain

Festival Foods is an American, family-owned grocery store chain based in Minnesota, United States (not to be confused with the Wisconsin store chain). It operates six stores in the Twin Cities and is owned and operated by sisters Marie Aarthun and Lauri Youngquist. Their stores are located in Andover, Bloomington, Brooklyn Park, Hugo, Lexington and White Bear Lake. The stores in Andover and Hugo feature Dunn Bros in-store coffee houses that roast their beans fresh on-site. The chain also contains other special in-store offerings, such as a full selection liquor store in Hugo and a café at the Bloomington Location. Festival Foods stores were previously located in Vadnais Heights and Virginia, Minnesota.
