= Schnucks =

Supermarket chain based in St. Louis

Schnuck Markets, Inc.
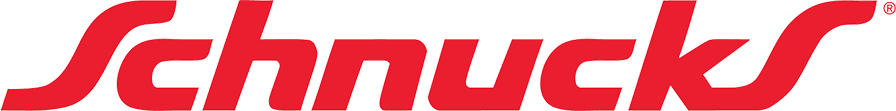
- Trade name: Schnucks
- Type: Private; family business
- Industry: Retail; Supermarket
- Founded: 1939 (87 years ago) in St. Louis, Missouri, U.S.
- Founder: Edwin Schnuck
- Headquarters: 11420 Lackland Rd., St. Louis, Missouri, U.S.
- Number of locations: 113
- Areas served: Missouri, Illinois, Indiana, and Wisconsin.
- Key people: Todd Schnuck (CEO)
- Products: Bakery, dairy, deli, frozen foods, meat, general grocery, pharmacy, produce, seafood, floral, snacks, and liquor
- Revenue: $3.1 billion (2024)
- Owner: Schnuck family (100%)
- Number of employees: 11,591 (2025)
- Subsidiaries: Festival Foods; Hometown Grocers, Inc.
- Website: Schnucks.com

Schnuck Markets, Inc., doing business as Schnucks (SHNUUKS), is a supermarket chain. Based in the St. Louis area, the company was founded in 1939 with the opening of a 1,000-square-foot (93 m^{2}) store in north St. Louis and currently operates 113 stores across Missouri, Illinois, and Indiana. Schnucks also ran stores under the Logli Supermarkets and Hilander Foods banners. Schnucks is one of the largest privately held supermarket chains in the United States and dominates the St. Louis metro grocery market.

In October 2025, Todd Schnuck, Chairman and CEO, announced the purchase of 51 Wisconsin grocery stores, bringing the Schnucks footprint to 164 stores.

== History ==
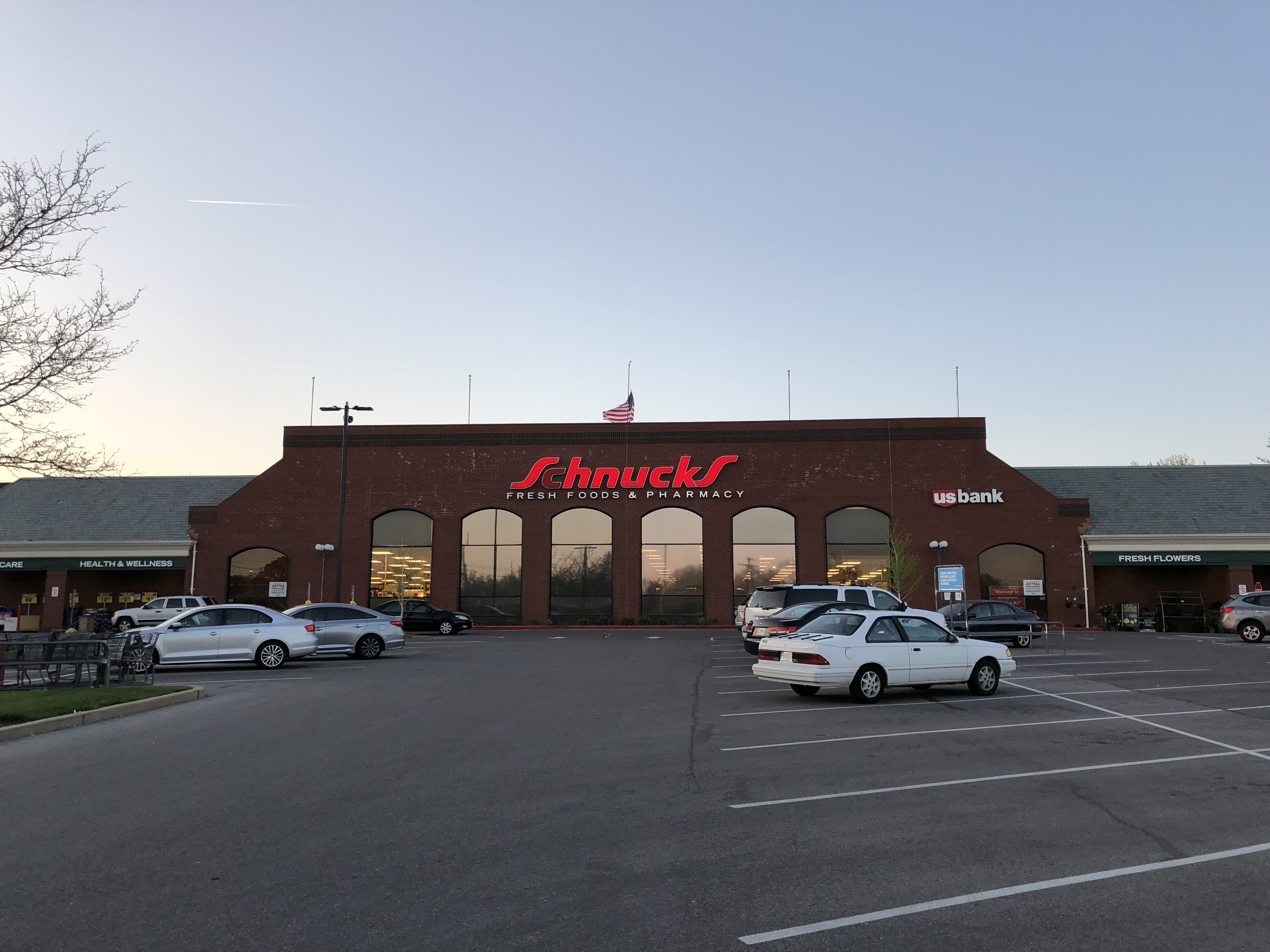
A Schnucks store in Kirkwood, Missouri, a suburb of St. Louis

Schnuck Markets, Inc. was founded in St. Louis in 1939. In 1943, its first large-scale retail store was opened, measuring 2,700 square feet (250 m^{2}). By 1952, its first major store was opened in Brentwood, a St. Louis suburb. The Schnucks symbol, a soldier, was introduced in 1968. Schnucks continued to grow, adopting the motto "Friendliest Stores In Town" and acquiring stores in Illinois, Indiana, Tennessee, Mississippi, Missouri, Iowa, and Wisconsin. By the late 1960s, Schnucks had 10 stores in the St. Louis area.

In a merger in 1970, Schnucks acquired the Bettendorf-Rapp chain of grocery stores—temporarily forming the Schnucks-Bettendorf's chain until the latter half of the combined name was dropped a couple of years later—just as Bettendorf's had swallowed up the Rapp chain of stores to form Bettendorf-Rapp's in the 1960s. Schnucks underwent a major expansion in 1995 when it purchased from Loblaws the National Supermarkets chain (a total of 57 stores), also based in St. Louis.

The company's growth in the St. Louis area was bolstered by the local abandonment of two major supermarket chains: A&P in the 1970s, and Kroger in 1986.

=== Expansion ===
In 2002, Schnucks agreed to buy 12 Seessel's stores in the Memphis, Tennessee area, from Albertsons, Inc. Schnucks operated these stores until September 2011. Kroger subsequently purchased these stores; eight reopened as Kroger, with the others closing altogether. Seven convenience stores operating under the Schnucks name also were sold, to be converted to the Kroger-owned brand Kwik Shop.

In 2008, Schnucks acquired grocery store Hart Food and Drug in O'Fallon, IL making it the fifth Schnucks in St. Clair County.

In August 2009, Schnucks opened a store in downtown St. Louis. This store, located at the corner of Ninth and Olive Streets in the central business district, was called "Culinaria – A Schnucks Market" and was advertised as a "new urban prototype". The store includes 20,800-square-foot (1,930 m^{2}) of shopping space, an additional 6,306-square-foot (585.8 m^{2}) mezzanine with a wine department, tapas/wine bar, a full-service pharmacy, meat and seafood departments, florist, bakery, and a Kaldi's Coffee bar. The placement of the store reflects the downtown area's urban renewal of the 21st century, including Washington Avenue Loft District, St. Louis loft-style condominiums and apartments. In 2020, Schnucks opened another prototype store, named "EatWell - A Natural Food Store by Schnucks", located in a former Lucky's Market off Providence Road in Columbia, Missouri near the campus of the University of Missouri. Both the Culinaria and EatWell concepts were eventually abandoned and the downtown St. Louis and Providence Road locations were converted into mainline Schnucks stores.

On September 18, 2018, it was announced that SuperValu would sell 19 of its Shop 'n Save locations to Schnucks.

In 2020/2021, Schnucks exited the Iowa/Quad Cities market with the closing of their Bettendorf, Iowa store and a pharmacy in Moline, Illinois (with the customers transferred to the stand-alone CVS as part of that acquisition).

In September 2022, Schnucks purchased the only two locations of Missouri-based grocer Fricks Market. In October 2022, the newly renovated Schnucks store of Union opened to the general public.

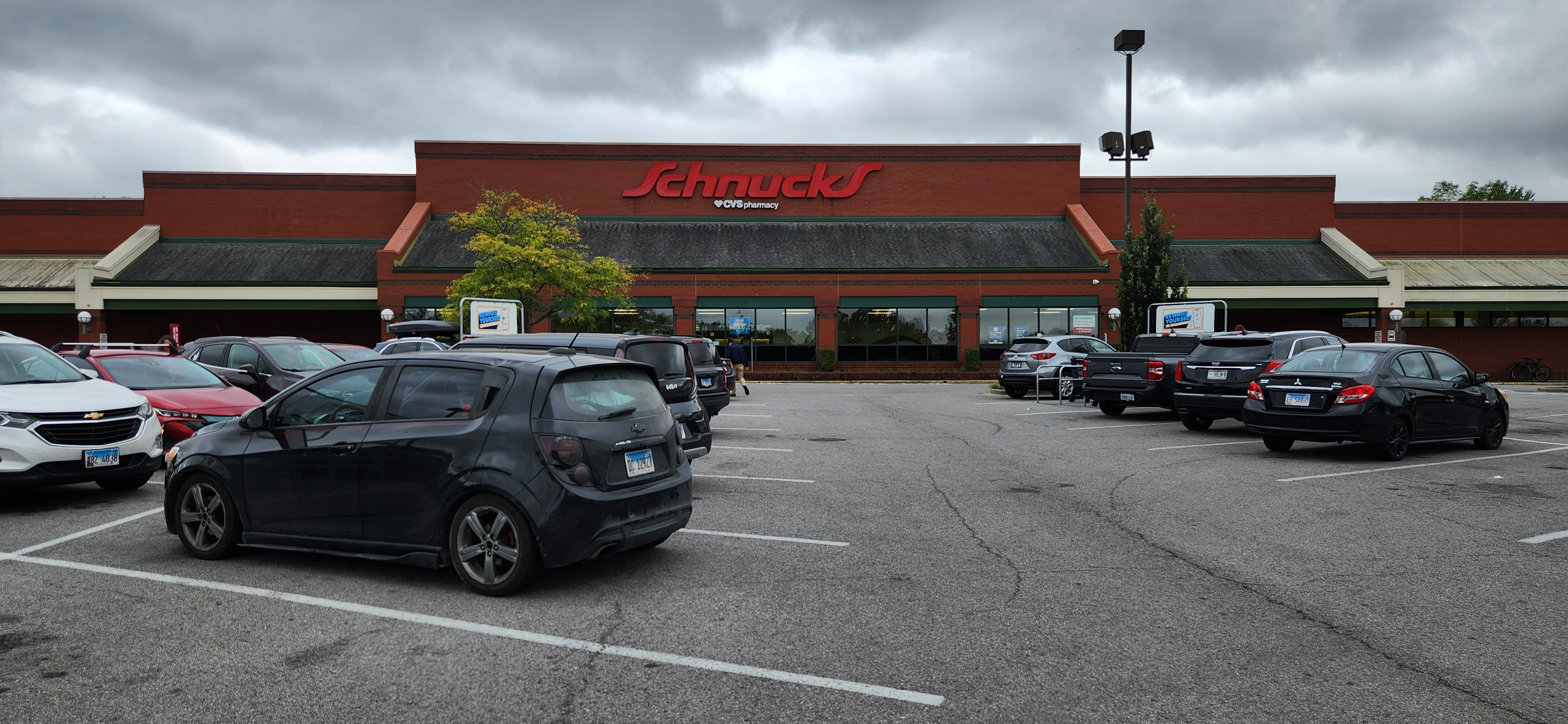
A Schnucks store in Carbondale, Illinois

In 2025, the Schnuck family founded 1939 Group, Inc. The name honors the year Anna Donovan Schnuck opened the first store location in St. Louis.

In September 2025, the 1939 Group purchased 51 Wisconsin-based grocery locations, including 42 Festival Foods stores and 9 Hometown Grocers, Inc. stores, and also added over 8,000 employees. The Festival Foods and Hometown Grocers stores will maintain their existing banners.

== Pharmacy ==
The first Schnucks Pharmacy was opened in March 1970. As of 2012, there were 95 in-store pharmacies across Missouri, Illinois, Indiana, Wisconsin and Iowa. The quality of the healthcare provided by Schnucks Pharmacy was recognized as "Pharmacy Chain of the Year 2008" by Drug Topics magazine. In 2008, Schnucks offered over 50 generic prescriptions that could be filled for $4 for a 30-day supply, or $10 for a 90-day supply.

In 2020, 110 pharmacies at Schnucks were taken over by CVS Pharmacy, making them the second in-store pharmacy to be converted to the CVS brand after Target had switched to them a few years prior. Along with the ownership change came the closure of 11 pharmacies, mainly near existing CVS locations, with customers being transferred to those respective stores.

== See also ==
- Kroger, largest supermarket chain in the United States
- National Supermarkets, former St. Louis chain of supermarkets, based in Canada
- Dierbergs Markets, Schnucks's main competitor in the St. Louis area
