= Farm Fresh Food & Pharmacy =

Grocery store chain in the US state of Virginia

- Type: Subsidiary
- Industry: Retail
- Founded: 1957 (69 years ago)
- Headquarters: Virginia Beach, Virginia
- Products: Bakery, dairy, deli, frozen foods, general grocery, meat, pharmacy, produce, seafood, sushi bar, snacks, wine, beer
- Owner: Raphael Strumlauf and Mark Green (Richmond store); Chris Lee (Portsmouth and Newport News stores)
- Website: Archived official website at the Wayback Machine (archive index)

Farm Fresh Food & Pharmacy is a supermarket chain with four independently owned stores, all of which are in Virginia. At its peak, Farm Fresh called itself "Virginia's Grocery Store" because it had stores spanning the state. Its headquarters were located in Virginia Beach and its largest presence was in the surrounding Norfolk/Virginia Beach (Hampton Roads) metropolitan area. The company was a wholly owned subsidiary of Eden Prairie, Minnesota-based SuperValu. On March 14, 2018, it was revealed that parent company, SuperValu, would be selling 21 stores to Kroger (under Kroger Mid-Atlantic and Harris Teeter) and Ahold Delhaize (under Food Lion). Currently, three Farm Fresh stores remain in operation under different ownership.

== History ==
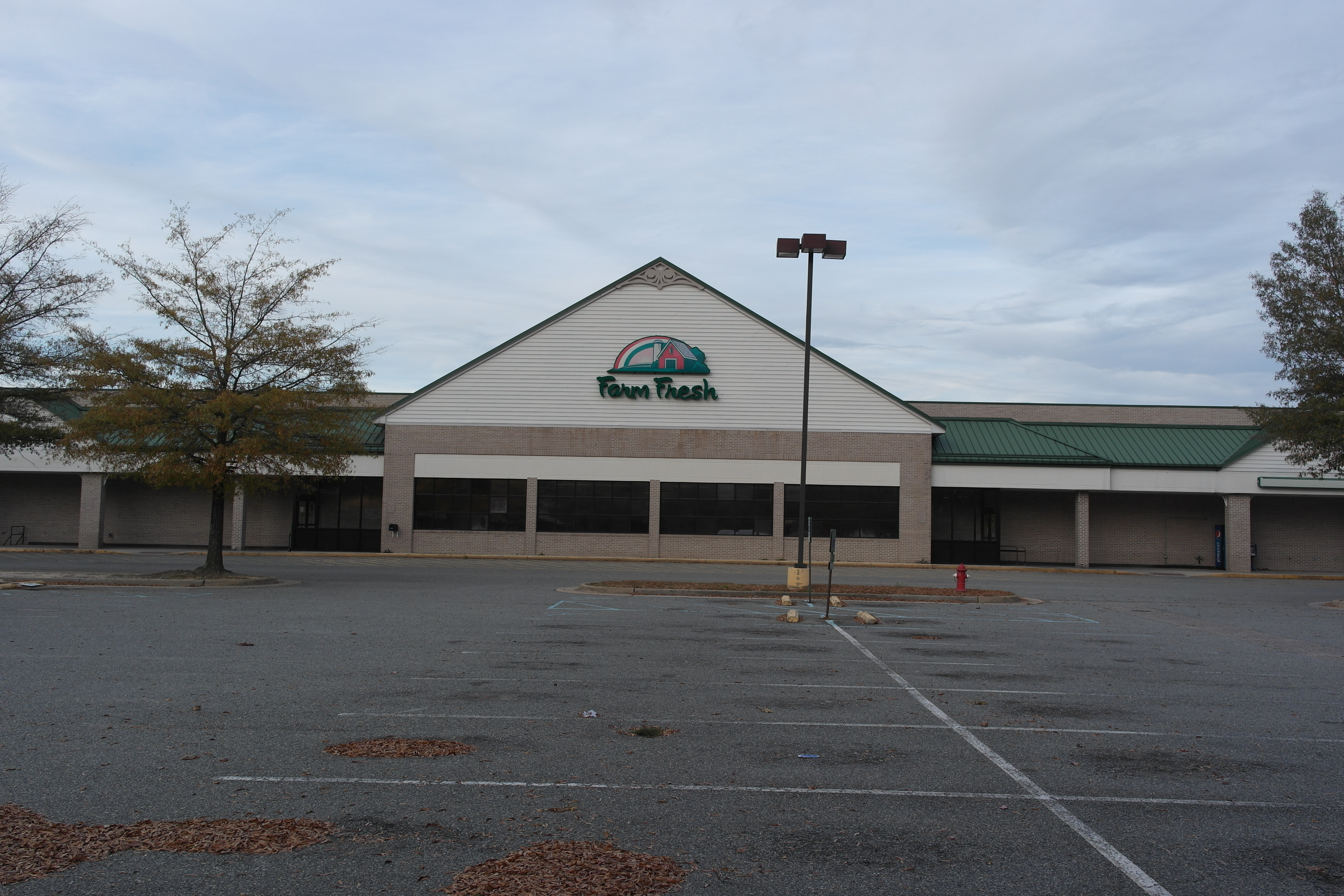
The Norge, Virginia Farm Fresh & Pharmacy store. This store closed in October 2019.

=== Early years and growth ===
Farm Fresh was founded by David Furman in 1957. The name 'Farm Fresh' was chosen from entries submitted by local residents. Farm Fresh merged with competitor Giant Open Air Markets in 1986 and acquired its 26 full line grocery stores and 43 of its "Tinee Giant" convenience stores. After that merger, Farm Fresh added the arch in its logo that Giant Open Air used at its stores. Also, in the mid 1980s, Farm Fresh purchased Lou Smith Supermarkets, which had a strong presence on the Virginia Peninsula and Gloucester areas.

Beginning in the early 1990s, Farm Fresh expanded into several new brands, including Food Carnival, Rack & Sack, The Grocery Store and The Market. Rack & Sack was a bulk purchase style store similar to BJ's but no membership was required. The stores were like a warehouse and customers bagged their own items. The Market was a very high end store, beautifully designed interiors with an actual chef on duty daily preparing hot meals and specials. There were two locations, downtown Norfolk and Richmond, Va. The Grocery Store was a Richmond-based chain Farm Fresh operated for a time in the late 1980s and for much of the 1990s, with Farm Fresh converting 15 stores it acquired from Safeway in November 1993 as Safeway exited the Richmond market. Rack & Sack stores and Food Carnivals closed by 2003, while The Market closed in 2011.

=== Financial troubles and SuperValu acquisition ===
In 1997, Farm Fresh made local headlines due to financial problems, which led to filing of bankruptcy. In March 1998, Farm Fresh was purchased by Richfood Holdings, Inc., which also owned Shoppers Food & Pharmacy. The company would have closed but the purchase by Richfood (Farm Fresh's biggest vendor) kept the company alive. In August 1999, Richfood Holdings was purchased by SuperValu Inc. On November 4, 2009, longtime executive Gene Walters died at the age of 86. Farm Fresh president Ron Dennis retired and was replaced by Gaelo de la Fuente, vice president of retail operations support for SuperValu Inc., as of March 10, 2010.

On September 11, 2012, Gaelo de la Fuente retired as President "to pursue other interests". Bill Parker, senior vice president of merchandising for Farm Fresh, took over as interim president as of September 15, 2012, and was promoted to President on March 4, 2013. Only a couple of months in his new position Bill Parker also left, "pursuing other interest." In August 2013, Micky Nye, Vice President of Shoppers Food & Pharmacy, entered the position becoming the first female president of Farm Fresh.

Since then Supervalu, parent company to Farm Fresh, has created a secondary company titled "Retail East" which has removed much of the Farm Fresh upper level management. Micky Nye has taken the position of Regional VP of Operations within this company leaving no president in Farm Fresh. Marc "Theo" Theophelakes, Vice President of Farm Fresh, has taken a position in Supervalu, Senior Director of Operations, based out of Eden Prairie, MN. The company that has boasted being run locally and enveloped itself in community affairs is no longer run by individuals with local ties to those communities.

These shifts in leadership, leaving a void in upper level management, coupled with the recent news articles has shaken the company. Many long time employees are being left in the dark about what Supervalu has in store for them. The recent exit of several executives along with other personnel from the Farm Fresh corporate office and a hiring freeze of an unknown timeframe continues to frustrate the employees hoping for a better tomorrow.

=== Recent developments ===
On March 14, 2018, SuperValu Inc. announced they are selling 21 of its 38 Farm Fresh Food & Pharmacy stores to The Kroger Co. (under Kroger Mid-Atlantic and Harris Teeter) and Ahold Delhaize (under Food Lion) for $43 million (~$52.7 million in 2024) in cash. The deals closed on May 4, 2018. On May 14, 2018; two of the remaining locations in Newport News and Virginia Beach were sold to an independent grocer named Chris Lee, who announced plans to keep the Farm Fresh name and other items (including the grocery chain's popular fried chicken) as is. Similarly, a location in the Shockoe Bottom section of Richmond, Virginia was sold to Charlottesville-based Neighborhood Grocery Holdings LLC; which also announced plans to keep the store operating as a Farm Fresh; while SuperValu would be retained as a supplier. Meanwhile, in August Kumar Bhavanasi, president of New Jersey IT company First Tek, purchased two stores, in Norge, Virginia and Virginia Beach, Virginia on Diamond Springs Rd; also planning to retain the Farm Fresh name in those stores. Recently, the Farm Fresh store in Portsmouth, Virginia which was store #664, began displaying signs that it could reopen as soon as November 2, 2018. That store was rebuilt and reopened in under 10 days, with workers putting in as much as 12-hour days to restore the fixtures and interior that had been partially ripped out when the closure of the store happened. Chris Lee began the process to buy store #664 which halted further work dismantling it. The Portsmouth store reopened following the renovation process, attracting local media coverage.

A new Farm Fresh website and Facebook page was launched, by local Virginia Beach Agency Bryant Digital, to represent the three stores Lee owns: Portsmouth, Virginia Beach (Chimney Hill) and Newport News, near the airport.

In September 2019, it was announced the Norge location would close, citing increased competition which left only 4 stores: Richmond, Newport News, Portsmouth and Virginia Beach. The Virginia Beach Store closed on March 6, 2020.

In April 2022, the Poquoson location reopened under new ownership. On January 9, 2024; it was announced that the Poquoson location would close its doors.
