= Hornbacher's =

Supermarket chain in North Dakota, US

- Hornbacher's, Northport Fargo location.
- Type: Subsidiary
- Industry: Supermarket
- Founded: 1951; 75 years ago
- Founders: Ted Hornbacher; Jim Custer
- Headquarters: Fargo, North Dakota; Moorhead, Minnesota; West Fargo, North Dakota
- Number of locations: 8
- Parent: Coborn's, Inc.
- Website: www.hornbachers.com

Hornbacher's is a supermarket chain that operates eight stores in Fargo and West Fargo, North Dakota, and Moorhead, Minnesota. Hornbacher's is a wholly owned subsidiary of St. Cloud based Coborn's, Inc.

== History ==
In 1951, Ted Hornbacher and his partner Jim Custer opened a store at the corner of Eighth and Main Avenue in Moorhead. This was the start of what is now known as Hornbacher's. In 1956, the Northport location opened in north Fargo. This location housed the corporate offices until the opening of the Osgood location in 2006. In 1958, the Moorhead location was moved to a larger facility on the east side of Eleventh and Main. In 1974, the Village West location in Fargo opened across the street from West Acres Shopping Center. In 1975, Hornbacher's was acquired by SuperValu Inc. In 1990, the Express store in Fargo was added to Hornbachers and in 1994 the Southgate location in Fargo opened. Hornbacher's also operated a store in Grand Forks from October 2015 to December 2018.

In early 2006, Hornbacher's opened its sixth store in Osgood, a neighborhood of Fargo. This also was the first location to sell gasoline, however a gas station has since been added to the Southgate location on 32nd Avenue S. in Fargo. In 2006, Hornbacher's began its "Hornbacher's To Go" home delivery service in Fargo. In October 2006, Hornbacher's finished the remodel of its Northport store.

In 2009, Hornbacher's revamped their advertising. Dropping the "Hornbacher's H" logo seen on print and TV ads and dropping their longtime slogan "We make shopping EASY!" in favor of "Good Things are just around the corner", the slogan now in use by all Supervalu owned stores. This slogan was in turn changed in favor of "Serving Our Community Since 1951" to reflect Hornbacher's local presence against rival chains such as Family Fare and Walmart. The Hornbacher's logo was also overhauled in 2014, placing the stylized "H" in a black circle with the "Hornbacher's" name arching over it.

On November 29, 2018, it was announced that parent company Coborn's would purchase Hornbacher's from United Natural Foods for $2.9 billion.
