= Dierbergs Markets =

Missouri based grocery store

Dierbergs Markets Inc.
- Company type: Private
- Industry: Retail (Grocery)
- Founded: As a general store 1854 (172 years ago); As a grocery store 1914; 112 years ago
- Founder: H.M. Koch (general store); William Dierberg (grocery store)
- Headquarters: Chesterfield, Missouri, USA
- Number of locations: 26
- Area served: St. Louis County, St. Charles County, Metro East
- Key people: Bob Dierberg, chairman; Greg Dierberg, CEO and President; Laura Dierberg-Padousis, Vice President and Secretary; Andy Pauk, Chief Operating Officer and Senior Vice President
- Products: Bakery, delicatessen, florist, meat, frozen foods, produce, seafood, organic foods, bulk foods, general grocery, pharmacy, snacks
- Revenue: ▲$847.4 million (2023)
- Owner: Dierberg family
- Number of employees: ~4,200
- Website: dierbergs.com

Dierbergs is a supermarket chain based in Chesterfield, Missouri. It effectively splits the Greater St. Louis grocery market with Schnucks among locally based retailers. Dierbergs operates 26 stores in both Missouri and Illinois. In 2006 it employed more than 5,000 employees, making it one of the top 25 largest employers in the St. Louis metro area.

== History ==
In 1854, H.M. Koch opened a general store on Olive Street Road in Creve Coeur, MO, east of present-day Highway 270. William F. Dierberg Sr. purchased the store in 1914. The store, located at the "Creve Coeur House," also contained the 14-Mile House hotel and the Creve Coeur Farmer's Bank. In 1929, William turned the business over to his three sons, Bill, Fred & Vallie (Butch). The following year, the company moved into a new building on Olive Street Road. The company continued to operate from that location until 1960, when it moved to a new location in Creve Coeur, at the corner of Craig and Olive.

In 1967, Bill's son Bob Dierberg opened a second location four miles west of the Creve Coeur store. The national trade magazine Progressive Grocer named the new location "Store of the Month," praising its modern design. In 1969, Roger Dierberg, Bob's cousin, left behind an engineering career at McDonnell Douglas to join the family business. Roger and Bob expanded the chain to 20 locations during Roger's time with the company.

In 2013, the chain opened its first location outside of the St. Louis metro when it expanded to Osage Beach, Missouri, near the Lake of the Ozarks. In 2017, Dierbergs partnered with Shipt to provide grocery delivery service to St. Louis-area residents. The chain sold its traditional and specialty pharmacies to St. Louis-based health system Mercy in 2021 for an undisclosed amount. Mercy continues to operate the former Dierbergs pharmacies under a long-term lease. In 2022, Dierbergs introduced a free rewards program, known as Dierbergs Rewards, and a mobile app.

== Development of Crestwood Plaza ==
In January 2022, Dierbergs purchased the western half of the former Crestwood Plaza mall site in south St. Louis County. The company built a 70,000 square foot store, along with an additional 30,000 square feet of restaurants and retail on multiple out lots, an open-space plaza, and green space. It is developing the new shopping center concurrently with McBride Homes, which is building a subdivision on the eastern half of the site. In April 2022, the St. Louis County NAACP filed a lawsuit against the city of Crestwood, challenging the legality of tax-increment financing for the retail development and the need to subsidize a new grocery store in Crestwood. In the lawsuit, the NAACP argues that Dierbergs already has 12 stores within 10 miles of Crestwood's two ZIP codes, but only has three stores in Ferguson and Spanish Lake, areas that the USDA classifies as food deserts. In December 2022, the NAACP asked Dierbergs to decline the tax incentive and build its new Crestwood location without taxpayer dollars. The NAACP also requested that the company build additional stores in areas of St. Louis City and north St. Louis County that have little access to grocery stores.
