= Cub (supermarket) =

American supermarket chain owned by United Natural Foods and others

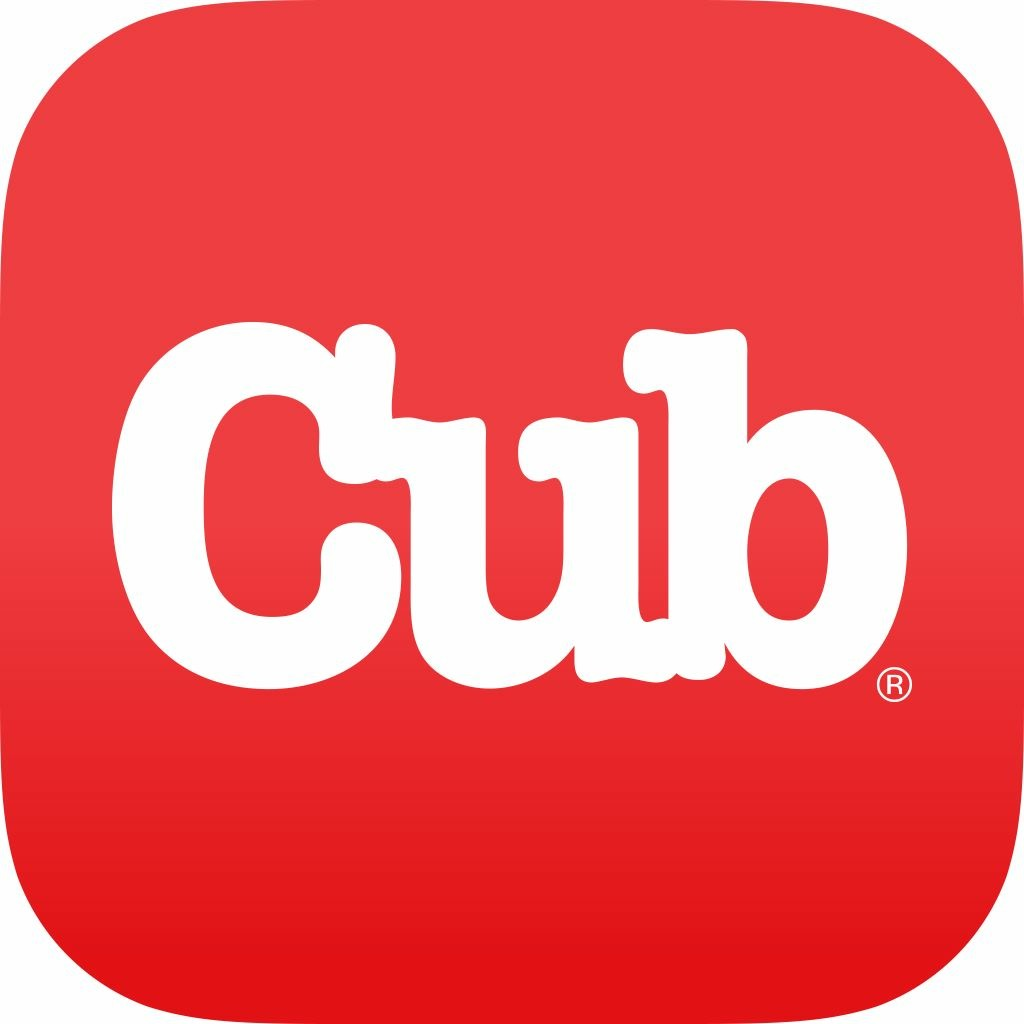

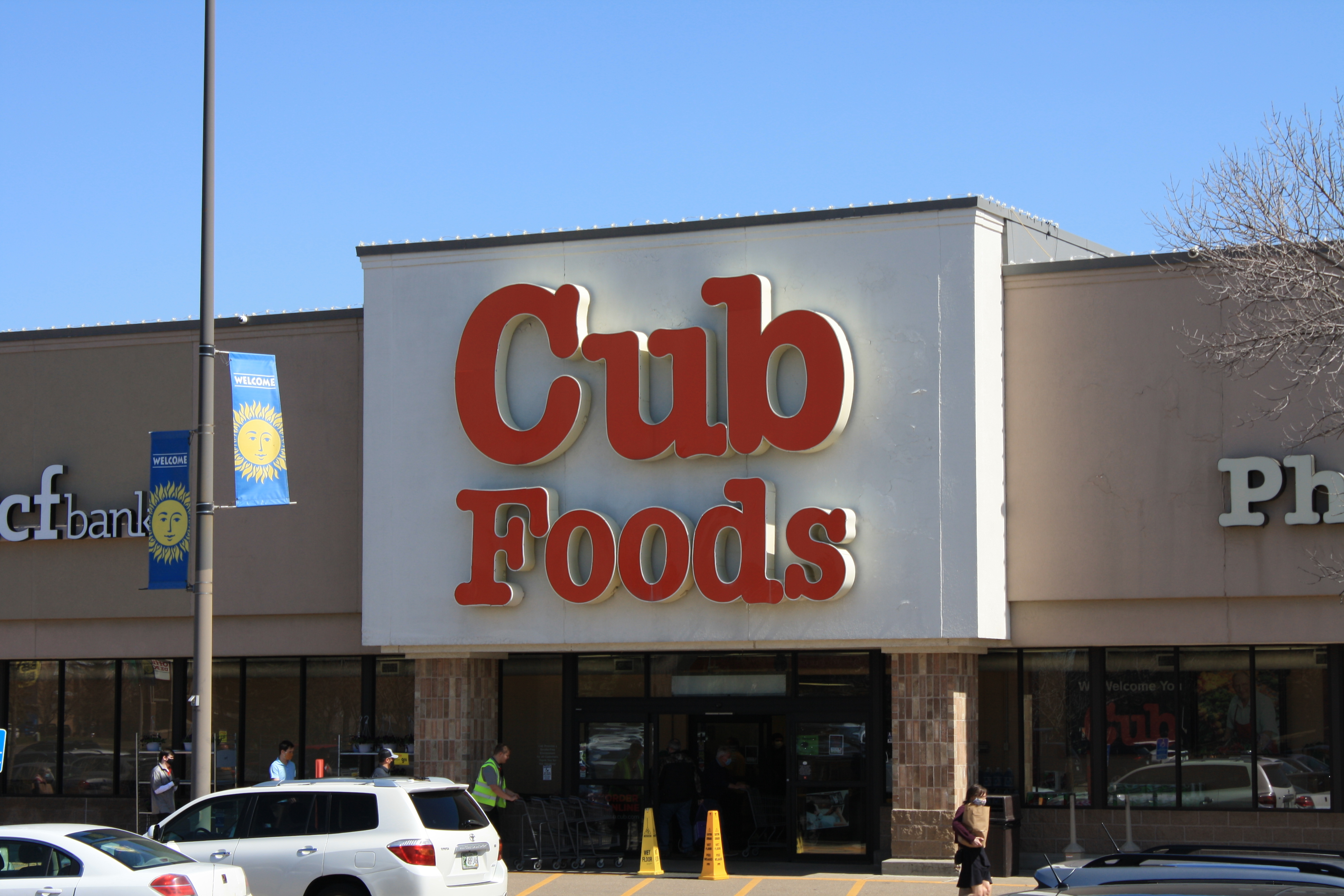
- Cub entrance at the Eden Prairie, Minnesota location with "Cub Foods" signage
- Formerly: Cub Foods (1968–2018)
- Type: Subsidiary
- Industry: Retail / grocery
- Founded: 1968; 58 years ago in Stillwater, Minnesota, U.S.
- Founders: Charles Hooley, Jack Hooley, Robert Thueson and Culver Davis Jr.
- Headquarters: Stillwater, Minnesota, U.S.,
- Number of locations: 106
- Key people: David Best (CEO)
- Products: Bakery, catering, sushi, asian foods, hibachi, dairy, delicatessen, frozen foods, organic foods, fuel, grocery, lottery, pharmacy, produce, meats and seafood, snack food, floristry flowers, liquor
- Services: Supermarket; Pharmacy
- Revenue: US$37.6 million
- Total assets: US$23.2 million (2021)
- Owner: United Natural Foods
- Number of employees: ▲1,000 (2019)
- Website: cub.com

Cub is an American supermarket chain. It operates stores in Minnesota and Illinois. The company is a wholly owned subsidiary of United Natural Foods, based in Providence, Rhode Island.

== History ==
=== Beginnings ===
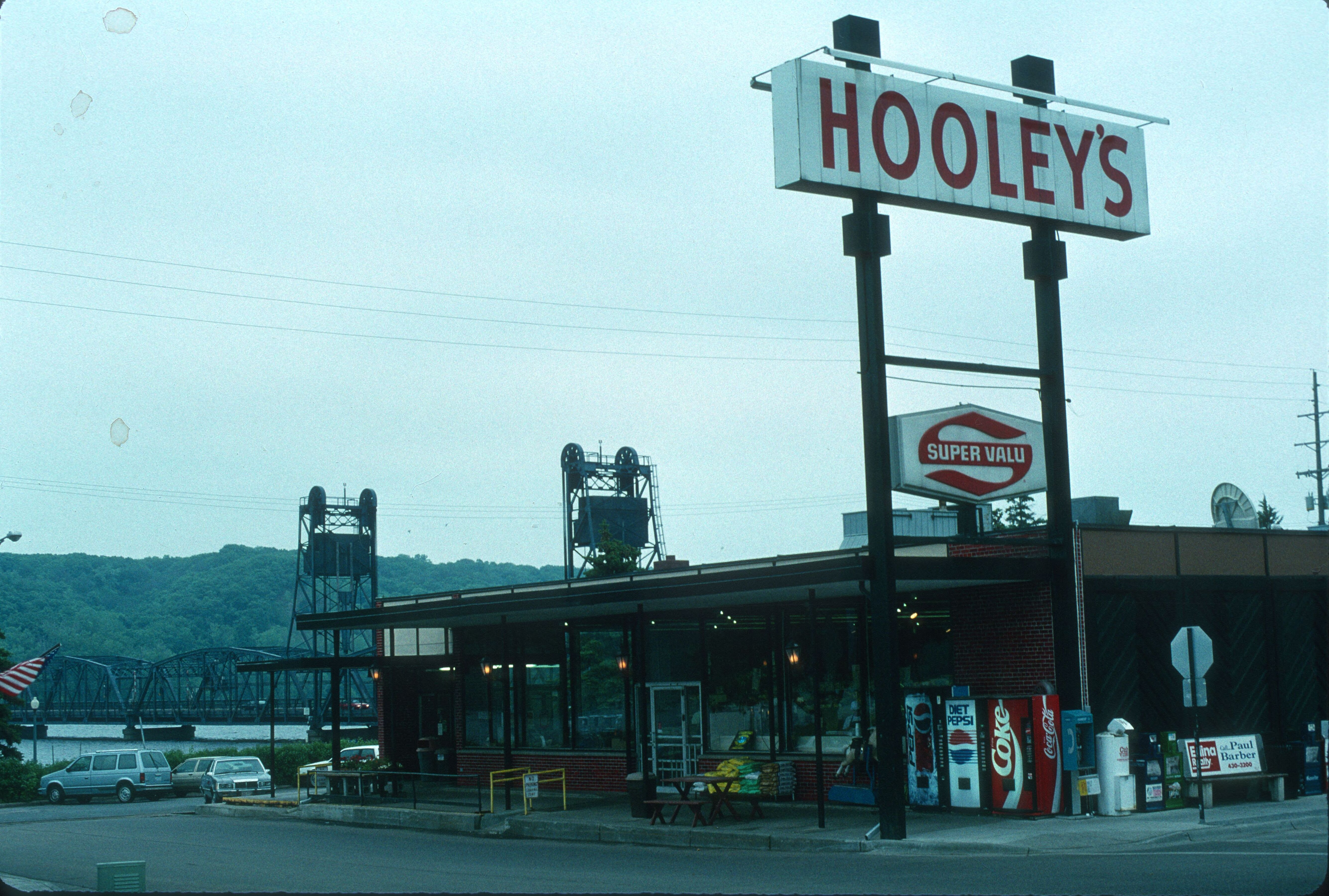
Hooley's Grocery Store in downtown Stillwater, Minnesota, 1980s

Cub Foods was founded by Minnesota-based Hooleys Supermarkets in 1968 in the riverside city of Stillwater by brothers Charles and Jack Hooley, brother-in-law Robert Thueson, and Culver Davis Jr. The name “CUB” was Culver Davis Jr's nickname, and from it they coined the acronym “Consumers United for Buying”, and Cub Foods was one of the first total discount food stores in the United States. The chain was bought by Minnesota-based SuperValu in 1980 with five stores in the Twin Cities. After the purchase, the chain expanded to 83 stores in three states, at least 10 of which are in the Twin Cities. Until 1998, WinCo Foods operated several Cub Foods stores. Cub Foods began operations in Colorado in 1986, but shuttered their nine stores in 2003; Kroger acquired some of the former locations. Cub once had a presence in Wisconsin, Iowa, Nebraska, Indiana, Nevada, Ohio, and Michigan as well. A store in Ames closed in 2010, ending the chain's time in Iowa. The last Wisconsin store closed in 2012.

The chain also had locations operated by Delhaize Group in parts of the Southern United States, namely in the metro Atlanta and metro Nashville areas in the 1980s and 1990s. The distinctively curved aqua-green tin roof on the front of a red brick façade can still be seen on many of these buildings, including the Northeast Cobb YMCA.

=== Effects from Albertsons merger ===
As part of SuperValu's acquisition of New Albertsons, including its Chicago-based Jewel-Osco stores, SuperValu divested its Chicago-area Cub Foods locations to an investment group headed by Cerberus Capital Management, to avoid market concentration issues. (The Cerberus-led group later acquired New Albertsons from SuperValu in March 2013, reuniting the two Albertsons companies under the common holding company Albertsons LLC.) Since Cerberus took control, four locations (Algonquin, Bedford Park, 87th Street in Chicago, and Naperville) closed, and Cerberus then announced that it was selling the remaining Illinois stores to other operators. The last of the Chicago-area Cub Foods stores closed on December 10, 2006. A majority of them were sold to Central Grocers Cooperative and operated as Strack & Van Til and Ultra Foods by a wholly owned unit of the cooperative, and as Garden Fresh Markets by one of its members; others were sold to Grand Mart International Foods. However, only four of the eight stores sold to Grand Mart opened under that company's ownership, and all were closed after less than five months of operation. Central Grocers Cooperative subsequently went bankrupt in 2017. In recent months among the inflation crisis of 2021–2022, Cub Foods was considered overpriced by local pricing experts.

Cub Foods once had multiple locations in Illinois, including stores in the Peoria metropolitan area. In 2009, a Peoria-area store closing drew controversy, as the city was liable for a portion of the initial project. A single location remains in Freeport.

Three Springfield, Illinois, stores independently owned by Niemann Foods (two of which are former Jewel-Osco stores acquired from the Cerberus-led group) had a franchise to use the Cub Foods name as part of the stores' branding. These stores also carried selected Cub Foods-branded products under the same agreement. As of recently, these three stores no longer use the Cub Foods name; instead, they are now called County Market (another trademark owned by SuperValu but franchised to independent grocers). A Niemann-owned store in Bloomington, Illinois, used the Cub Foods name under license from SuperValu until closing in 2015.

In 2018, the word "Foods" was dropped from the name. The signs and ads now simply say “Cub,” and the remodeled stores reflect the broader assortment of goods needed to compete not just with Hy-Vee but Target, Walmart, Aldi, and even Amazon. Cub is the biggest chain in Supervalu's retail portfolio. Its sale of the Save-A-Lot discount chain for $1.3 billion “fundamentally changed our leverage,” Chief Executive Mark Gross said this year. Some of that is going toward updating Cub. As of 2017, new stores have opened in Blaine and Oakdale, while 18 Twin Cities locations have been remodeled. Nearly all of Cub's remodels are in areas where Hy-Vee opened stores nearby, including Maple Grove, Plymouth, and Brooklyn Park. Cub brought elements to the remodeled stores that customers liked — more grab-and-go foods, a larger produce section, and a drive-up pharmacy — but those were reactions to Hy-Vee. Stillwater is an exception. The new 88,500-square-foot store includes ideas that Cub executives are trying out before adding to other stores.

On July 26, 2018, it was announced that parent company Supervalu would be purchased by United Natural Foods for $2.9 billion. As a result of this purchase, Cub and other Supervalu retail properties will be divested from the company. In January 2022, United Natural Foods announced that Cub would no longer be divested.

== See also ==
- WinCo Foods
- Jewel-Osco
