= County Market =

Supermarket chain in the United States

- Company type: Subsidiary
- Industry: Retail
- Number of locations: 104
- Area served: Midwestern United States
- Parent: United Natural Foods
- Website: www.mycountymarket.com

County Market is a supermarket chain operating in the Midwestern United States. Presently, more than 100 independently owned County Market stores operate across Illinois, Indiana, Iowa, Missouri, and Kentucky. County Market is part of the United Natural Foods company since the latter's acquisition of SuperValu in 2018.

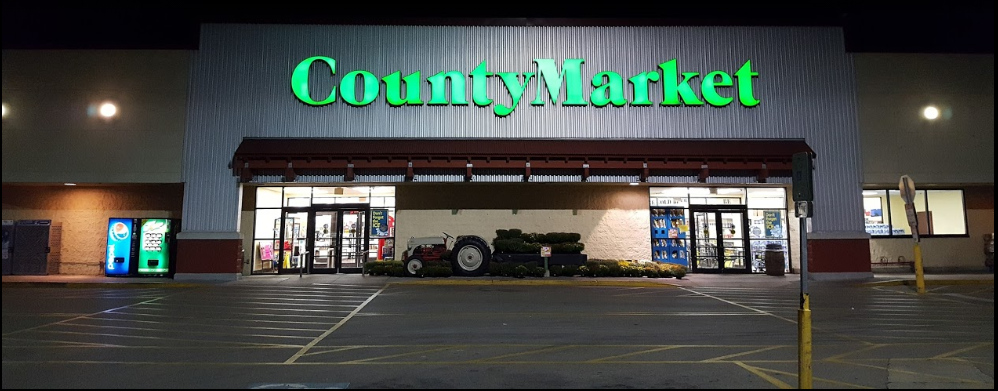
A County Market in Sterling, Illinois

Many stores are located in smaller cities and typically feature an in-store bakery and deli.

== See also ==
- Supermarkets in the United States
