= United Natural Foods =

American health and organic food wholesaler

United Natural Foods, Inc.
- Type: Public
- Traded as: NYSE: UNFI; S&P 600 component
- Industry: Food Wholesale/Distribution
- Founded: 1976
- Headquarters: Providence, RI, United States
- Area served: United States, Canada
- Key people: J. Alexander (Sandy) Miller Douglas (CEO); Giorgio Matteo Tarditi (COO and president)
- Products: wholesale natural, organic, ethnic and gourmet, grocery, produce, perishables, personal care, and supplements.
- Revenue: ▲US$31.8 billion (2025)
- Operating income: ▲US$241.96 million (2015)
- Net income: ▼ −US$118 million (2025)
- Number of employees: 28,300 (2021)
- Divisions: Alberts Fresh Produce; Honest Green eSolutions; Nor-Cal Produce; Tony’s Fine Foods; UNFI Brands+ UNFI Canada; UNFI Easy Options; UNFI Wellness; Woodstock Farms
- Website: unfi.com

United Natural Foods, Inc. (UNFI) is a Providence, Rhode Island–based natural and organic food company. The largest publicly traded wholesale distributor of health and specialty food in the United States and Canada, it is Whole Foods Market's main supplier, with their traffic making up over a third of its revenue in 2018. In 2025, the company offered approximately 230,000 products to 52 distribution centers.

== History ==
UNFI was founded in 1996 by the merger of two regional distributors—Mountain People's Warehouse (founded in 1976, serving the Western U.S.) and Cornucopia Natural Foods (founded in 1977, serving the Eastern U.S.)—forming the first natural products distributorship with national scope.

=== Leadership ===
J. Alexander (Sandy) Douglas has served as UNFI's chief executive officer and a member of its board of directors since August 2021. He succeeded former CEO, Steven Spinner.

In August 2026, UNFI named new executive leadership officers. Giorgio Matteo Tarditi was named president and chief operating officer, with responsibility for product sales organizations, enterprise customer relationships, supply chain operations, technology and lean implementation. Alfredo Luchini became chief financial officer.

=== Acquisitions ===
Since 1996, other regional distributors have merged with UNFI, filling in the distribution footprint and making UNFI the largest distributor of natural products.

In 2007, UNFI acquired Millbrook Distribution Services. In 2011, UNFI signed a distribution agreement with Safeway Inc. for the distribution of non-proprietary natural, organic and specialty products. This agreement was terminated by Safeway in July 2015, leading to a drop in share price and two rounds of layoffs, the first in the company's history.

In 2012, UNFI partnered with Buyer's Best Friend to create a unified reordering system.

UNFI acquired Tony's Fine Foods, a West Sacramento, California-based perishable food distributor in 2014. Two years later, the company completed the acquisition of Nor-Cal produce, Inc., Haddon House Food Products, Inc., and Gourmet Guru, Inc. On October 22, 2018, UNFI completed the acquisition of SuperValu, Inc.

=== Unauthorized computer system activity ===
In June 2025, UNFI disclosed that it had identified unauthorized activity in its computer systems. The company took certain systems offline while investigating the incident and subsequently restored ordering and invoicing systems. The incident disrupted operations and reduced fiscal 2025 sales, reportedly resulting in approximately $400 million in lost sales during the fiscal year.

== Divisions ==
- UNFI Canada
- Alberts Fresh Produce
- Tony's Fine Foods
- Nor-Cal Produce
- UNFI Wellness
- Woodstock Farms
- UNFI Brands+
- Honest Green eSolutions
- UNFI Easy Options

== Brands ==
- Essential Everyday
- Woodstock
- Wild Harvest
- Equaline
- Tumaro's Carb Wise Wraps
- Field Day
- Shoppers Value
- Asian Gourmet
- Culinary Circle
- Stone Ridge Creamery
- Mt Vikos
- Super Chill
- Arctic Shores
- Springfield
- Koyo
- Bio Pac
- Oasis

== Retail Banners ==
- County Market
- Cub
- Shoppers Food & Pharmacy
