= Hilander Foods =

Defunct American supermarket chain

Hilander
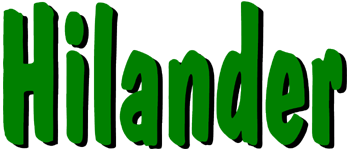
- Company type: Subsidiary of Schnuck Markets, Inc.
- Industry: Retail
- Founded: 1919
- Number of locations: 7
- Products: Bakery, dairy, deli, frozen foods, general grocery, meat, pharmacy, produce, seafood, snacks, liquor
- Parent: Schnucks
- Website: Schnucks

Hilander was a small chain of supermarkets in the metro area of Rockford, Illinois in the United States. The stores were operated by Schnucks, which acquired the chain from The Kroger Co. on September 21, 2011. As of May 2013, the stores have been rebranded to Schnucks.

== History ==
Joseph Castrogiovanni and his wife Rose founded Sanitary Meat Market in 1919. Castrogiovanni later renamed the chain Hilander. After a couple decades, their sons Alfred, Anthony, John, and Joseph, joined the family business. The Castrogiovanni family ran the Hilander Foods chain until 1997.

=== Kroger and Schnucks ===
On September 28, 1998, The Kroger Company of Cincinnati, Ohio, acquired the Hilander Foods chain. Kroger ran the chain under its Indianapolis-based Central Division which includes Pay Less Food Markets, Owen's Market, JayC Food Stores, and Scott's Food & Pharmacy. Alfred Castrogiovanni died in 2010, at age 87. In late 2011, The Kroger Co. sold the chain to Schnuck Markets, Inc., the owner of local rival Logli. Schnucks kept running the stores under the Hilander Foods banner for a couple of years, but eventually rebranded the stores to Schnucks. In 2011, there were seven Hilander stores: five in Rockford, one in Cherry Valley, and one in Roscoe.
