= Scott's Food & Pharmacy =

Grocery chain based in Fort Wayne, Indiana, US (1954–2016)

- Company type: Subsidiary of The Kroger Co.
- Industry: Retail
- Founded: 1954
- Defunct: 2016
- Fate: Closed or rebranded under the Kroger banner
- Products: Bakery, dairy, deli, frozen foods, grocery, meat, pharmacy, produce, seafood, snacks, liquor
- Parent: Kroger

Scott's Food & Pharmacy was a supermarket chain in the Fort Wayne, Indiana, market. The company was once a wholly owned subsidiary of SuperValu, but was acquired by The Kroger Co. in 2007. At the time of its purchase by Kroger, the chain had 18 locations. By late 2014, that number had dwindled to one location as a result of stores being closed or rebranded under the Kroger banner. However, the company shut down in 2016, due to the final store rebranding to Kroger.

== History ==
Donald G. Scott opened his first store in 1954. In 1963, Scott met William Reitz and the two merged their companies in 1979. In 1991, Scott's was acquired by SuperValu, Inc., who later renamed it Scott's Food & Pharmacy. It soon grew with a few more stores under SuperValu. Scott's was sold to The Kroger Company in 2007 for $33 million (~$48 million in 2024). In July 2007, Kroger announced that they would be closing five stores in Indiana. Donald Scott died in 2008. Kroger operated Scott's under the Central division, which included Owen's Market and Pay Less Food Markets. The final Scott's store located in Fort Wayne, rebranded to Kroger in 2016.

== See also ==
- Kroger
- SuperValu
