= Smith's Food and Drug =

American supermarket chain owned by Kroger

Smith's Food & Drug Centers, Inc.

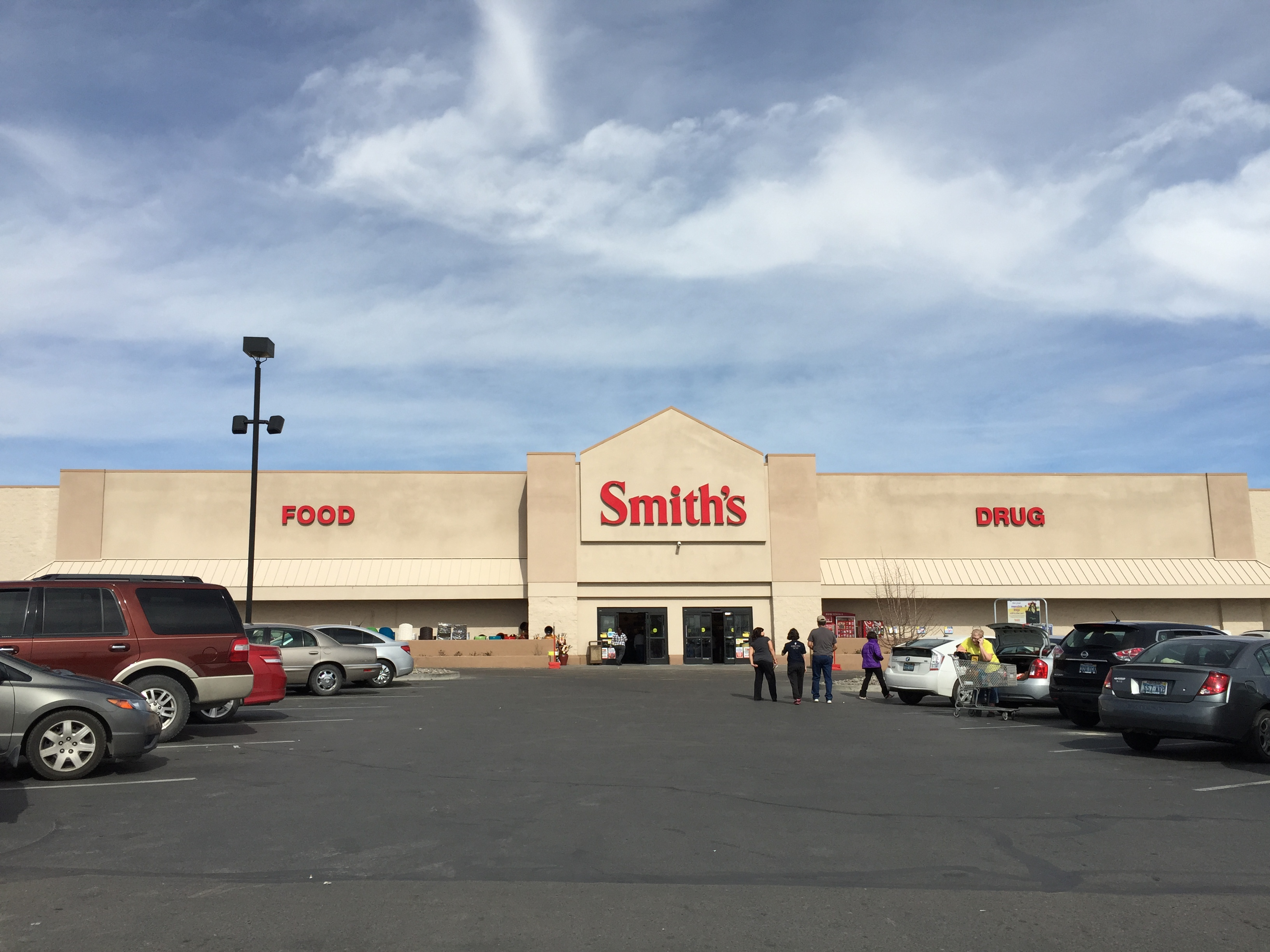
- Smith's store location in Elko, Nevada
- Formerly: L. Smith (1911–1932); Smith & Son's Market (1932–1952); Smith's Super Market (1952–1997)
- Type: Subsidiary
- Industry: Retail (Supermarket)
- Founded: 1911; 115 years ago in Brigham City, Utah, U.S.
- Founder: Lorenzo Smith
- Headquarters: Salt Lake City, Utah, U.S.
- Number of locations: 141 (Smith's Food and Drug); 18 (Smith's Marketplace); 4 (Smith's Express) (2018)
- Areas served: Idaho, Montana, Nevada, Northern Arizona, New Mexico, Utah and Wyoming
- Key people: Kenny Kimball (president)
- Products: Bakery, dairy, delicatessen, frozen foods, general grocery, liquor, lottery, meats, pharmacy, produce, seafood and snacks
- Services: Supermarket and pharmacy
- Revenue: ▲US$4 billion (2021)
- Number of employees: 22,000 (2021)
- Parent: Fred Meyer (1997–1998); Kroger (1998–present)
- Divisions: Smith's Marketplace; Smith's Express
- Website: www.smithsfoodanddrug.com

Smith's Food and Drug or simply Smith's (Note: Stylized as Smith’s.) is an American regional supermarket chain that was founded by Lorenzo Smith in 1911 in Brigham City, Utah. Headquartered in Salt Lake City with stores in Idaho, Montana, Nevada, Northern Arizona, New Mexico, Utah and Wyoming. Smith's is a division of Kroger, an American retail company based in Cincinnati, Ohio.

Kroger also operates stores under the Fry's name in Central and Southern Arizona.

== History ==
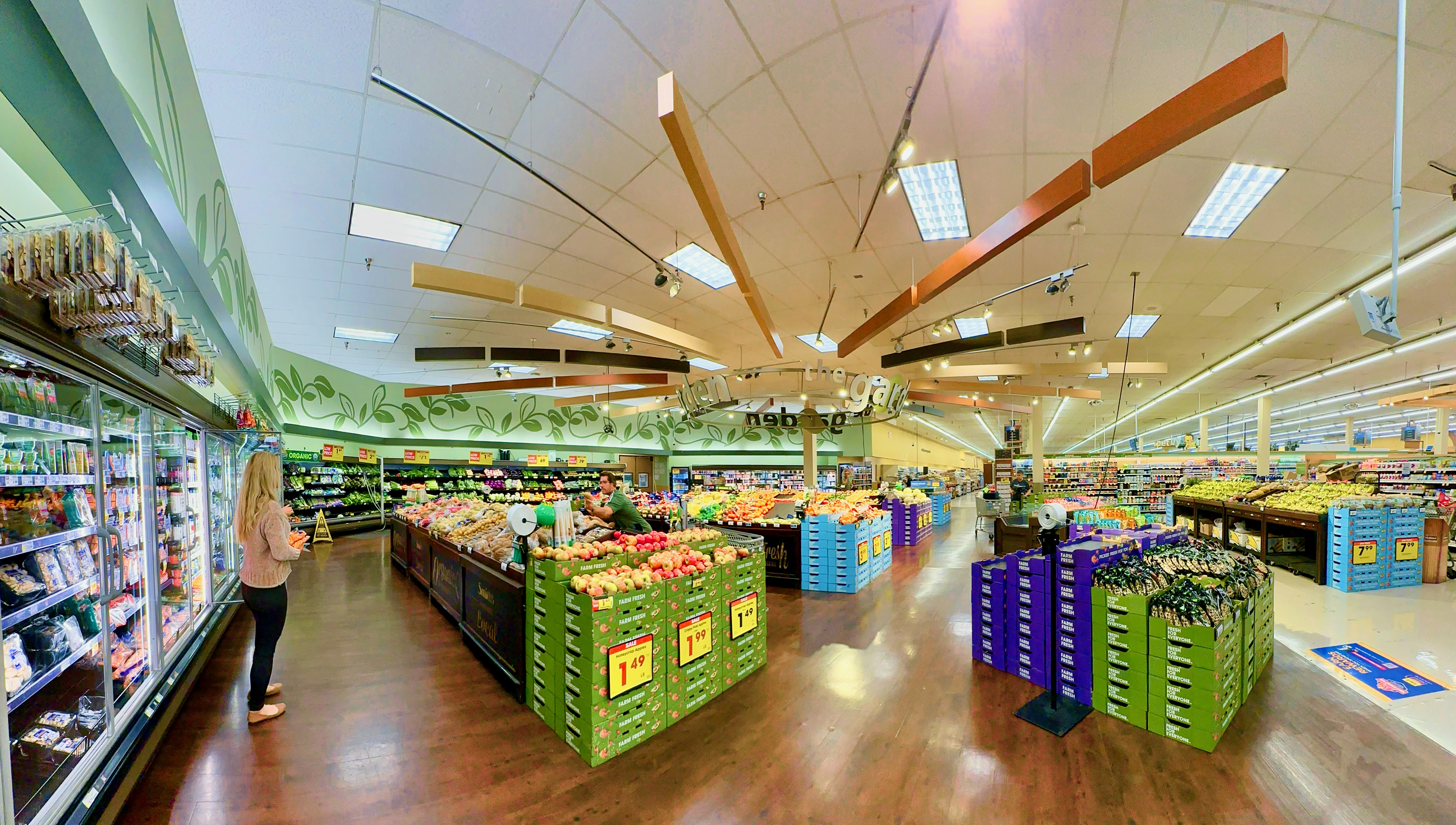
The interior of a Smith's supermarket in Las Vegas, Nevada

=== Beginning ===
Smith's Food & Drug began in 1911 when Lorenzo Smith opened a small dry goods store in Brigham City, Utah. It was replaced with a larger store across the street in 1922 and renamed "Smith & Son's Market" in 1932. When his son Dee Glen Smith joined the business after serving in World War II, he began immediately expanding it.

The company's growth ramped up exponentially from 1946 to 1958. It changed its name to Smith's Super Market in 1952. When Dee Smith took over as president upon his father's death in 1958, he determined Brigham City was saturated and felt the only option was to expand to other markets. Through partnerships and acquisitions, Dee Smith built the company until his death at age 58 in 1984. After his death, his eldest son Fred Smith, ran the chain until later, when his brother Jeff Smith became the chairman and CEO of Smith's.

In 1989, the company completed its initial public offering and shares of the company started trading on the New York Stock Exchange. In 1996, Smith's acquired the Arizona supermarket chain Smitty's Supermarkets.

== Acquisitions ==
=== Fred Meyer ===
In 1997, Smith's Food & Drug was acquired by Portland-based Fred Meyer for about $700 million (equivalent to $1.4 billion in 2025) in stock. The deal created a supermarket and general merchandise chain with 374 stores in 17 western states.

Under the terms of the agreement, Smith's shareholders received 1.05 shares of Fred Meyer common stock for each share of Smith's common stock, or about $45 a share. Fred Meyer also assumed $1.3 billion (equivalent to $2.61 billion in 2025) in Smith's debt, which was accumulated largely from a recapitalization that was led by the Yucaipa Companies of Los Angeles.

=== Kroger ===
In 1998, Fred Meyer was acquired by Kroger in a deal that created a supermarket giant with $43 billion ($83.1 billion in 2025) in annual revenue and 2,200 stores in 31 states. As a result of the Kroger–Fred Meyer merger, Smith's had immediately become a subsidiary of Kroger and most Smith's Food & Drug Centers in Arizona were rebranded as Fry's Food and Drug. Kroger paid about $8 billion (equivalent to $15.46 billion in 2025) in stock for Fred Meyer and assumed $4.8 billion (equivalent to $9.28 billion in 2025) of the company's debt, further consolidating the grocery business and creating the largest supermarket chain in the country.

With the transaction, Kroger regained the spot it lost to Albertsons as the nation's largest supplier of eggs and milk. The acquisition gave Kroger the status of the nation's largest supermarket company, stretching from the fast-growing Western markets, where Portland-based Fred Meyer is strong, to the Midwest and the Southeast, where the Cincinnati-based company has many stores and much visibility. The move gave Kroger even greater purchasing power and substantial economies of scale. Many of the products sold at Smith's are Kroger-branded.

== Smith's Marketplace ==
Smith's Marketplace logo

In 2004, Kroger introduced a new store concept known as Marketplaces which served as medium-sized department stores and sold clothing, household goods and often contained bank branches and a Fred Meyer Jewelers in addition to food and pharmacy sales. In April 2004, Kroger merged Fred Meyer's Utah operations into Smith's. Five Utah Fred Meyer stores were converted to the new Smith's Marketplace banner in June of that year. The other Utah Fred Meyer stores located in Ogden, West Valley City and Sandy were closed. Earlier, Fred Meyer had closed a full-service store located in Orem that failed to meet expectations.

On November 12, 2008, a new Smith's Marketplace store was opened in Lehi, Utah. The store is 170,000 square feet (16,000 m^{2}). In 2008, Smith's also remodeled the former Fred Meyer store located at 500 East and 500 South in Salt Lake City. That store in Downtown Salt Lake is the biggest location. On July 16, 2014, Smith's opened a new Smith's Marketplace in Los Alamos, New Mexico. In November 2014, Smith's opened up its seventh marketplace store in North Ogden, Utah. On December 3, 2014, Smith's opened up its eighth store in West Jordan, Utah, located off 7800 South and the Mountain View Corridor. Smith's opened its ninth Marketplace store in Kaysville, Utah in late 2015. Another Marketplace was opened in South Jordan, Utah late 2016, as well as another in Springville, Utah in April 2017. On June 13, 2018, Smith's opened its first Marketplace in northwest Las Vegas. On January 29, 2022, they opened a Marketplace in Henderson, Nevada. On December 6, 2025, they opened a marketplace in Tooele, Utah.

== Smith's Fuel Center and Smith's Express ==
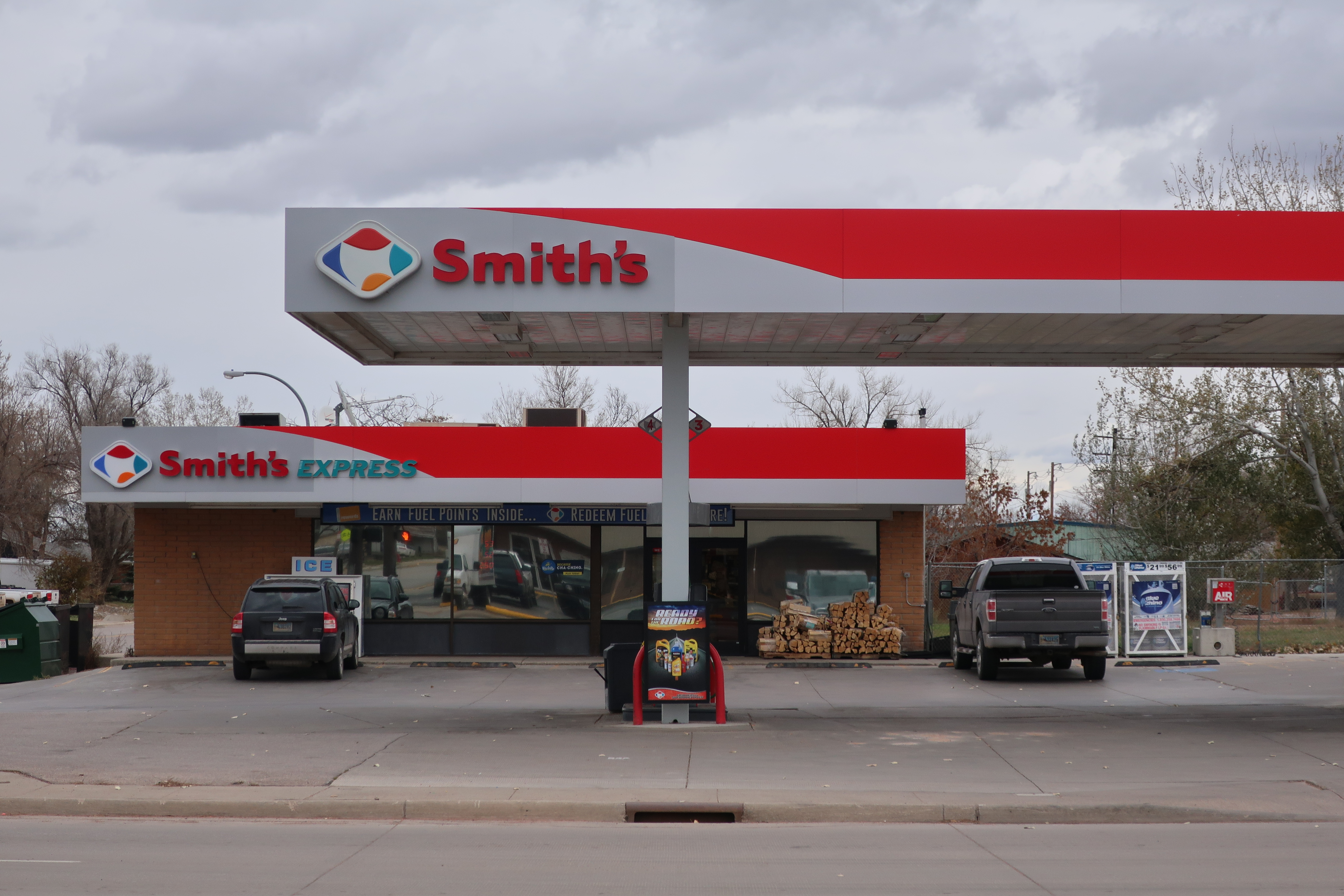
Smith's Express with a fuel center in Gillette, Wyoming

Smith's operates various fuel centers across the northwest and southwest regions of the United States. These fuel centers consist of fuel pumps and kiosks that sell convenience merchandise. Smith's also operates shops known as Smith's Express that sell convenience merchandise and are accompanied with a fuel station.

== Products ==
Smith's Food & Drug Centers offer a wide range of products from a wide range of brands. This includes Smith's banner products, Kroger banner products and products of Kroger private-label brands such as Simple Truth, Private Selection, Comforts, Abound, Luvsome, Bloom Haus, Murray's Cheese, Bakery Fresh Goodness, Dip, Home Chef, Pet Pride, OfficeWorks, HD Designs and Everyday Living.

=== Smith's Rewards ===
Just like other Kroger-affiliated stores, Smith's offers a rewards program for both customers and associates where rewards members can: buy certain items at certain sale prices, get discounts on certain items, earn fuel points that can allow Rewards members to save on fuel at Smith's or other Kroger-affiliated fuel centers, etc. Smith's Rewards can be used at other Kroger-affiliated stores.

== Sponsorships ==
Smith's has a current sponsorship with Primary Children's Hospital where Smith's provides donations to the hospital. Smith's also has sponsorships with sports organizations such as the Utah Jazz, Utah Utes and Salt Lake Bees.

== Visa credit cards ==
In early April 2019, Smith's Food & Drug had stopped accepting Visa credit cards, describing the fees as excessive. Smith's Food & Drug started to accept Visa credit cards again in late October 2019.
