= Arthur Bimrose =

American editorial cartoonist (1912–1998)

Arthur Sylvanus Bimrose
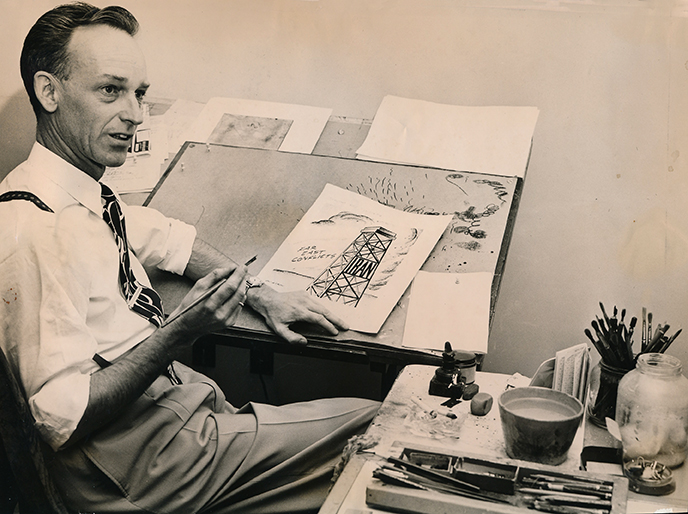
- Arthur Bimrose working on an editorial cartoon regarding Iranian conflict in the mid-1950s
- Born: March 18, 1912
- Died: August 7, 1998 (aged 86)
- Occupation: Cartoonist

Arthur Sylvanus Bimrose (March 18, 1912 – August 7, 1998) was an American editorial cartoonist for The Oregonian newspaper in Portland, Oregon from 1937-1983. His works span three decades and include humorous and satirical reflections on local, national, international affairs and American culture.

Bimrose was born in Spokane, Washington. During the Great Depression he attended the San Francisco Art Institute and the University of Oregon. He worked as a sign painter in Portland for Sears, Roebuck & Co. and Fred Meyer before joining The Oregonian art department in 1937. During WWII, he served two years in the U.S. Army´s 25th Division as a combat infantryman in the South Pacific, participating in the campaigns to liberate New Guinea and the Philippine Islands. After the war, he returned to The Oregonian and became the paper’s political cartoonist in 1947. Over the course of 34-years, his sharp wit and relaxed style reflected the Northwest personality. His works depicted issues of interest in the Northwest, including environmental crisis, two wars and the eventful 1960s. His works are in permanent collections throughout the United States, including the Library of Congress, the American Archives of Art in Detroit, the Oregon Historical Society and the libraries of Lyndon B. Johnson and John F. Kennedy.
