= Home Chef =

Meal kit company

- Type: Subsidiary
- Industry: Meal kits
- Founded: June 2013; 13 years ago
- Founder: Patrick Vihtelic
- Headquarters: Chicago, Illinois
- Area served: United States
- Services: Meal delivery service
- Number of employees: Over 1,500
- Parent: Kroger
- Website: www.homechef.com

Home Chef is a Chicago-based meal kit delivery company that provides pre-portioned ingredients and recipe cards for home cooking. The company operates a subscription-based meal delivery service and also sells meal solutions through retail locations in the Kroger family of stores.

Founded in 2013, Home Chef was acquired by Kroger in 2018 and operates as a wholly owned subsidiary. In 2021, Home Chef reported more than $1 billion in annual sales.

Home Chef offers multiple meal formats, including traditional meal kits, oven-ready meals, fast-prep recipes, family-sized meal kits, and ready-to-heat meals. The company also offers customization options, add-ons, and menu plans tailored to dietary preferences and household size.

== Overview ==
Home Chef is a meal delivery service that provides a box of pre-portioned fresh ingredients directly to consumers that are ready to cook. The company delivers to customers in the 48 contiguous United States and operates distribution facilities in Chicago, Atlanta (Lithia Springs, Georgia), Los Angeles (San Bernardino, California), and Baltimore. Home Chef employs more than 1,500 people.

Each meal kit comes with recyclable packaging, pre-portioned ingredients, and meal instructions. The rotating menu includes 35+ recipes to choose from, and the company also provides add-ons ("Extras") like snacks, lunches, breakfast, beverages, sides, and more.

== History ==
Home Chef was founded in June 2013 by Patrick "Pat" Vihtelic.

In September 2016, the company raised $40 million in funding from L Catterton, a consumer-focused private equity fund.

In May 2018, Kroger announced plans to acquire Home Chef for $200 million upfront, with up to $500 million in additional performance-based earn-outs. The acquisition closed in June 2018, and Home Chef became a wholly owned subsidiary of Kroger. Following the acquisition, Home Chef meal kits began rolling out in select Kroger stores nationwide.

In February 2019, Home Chef introduced Customize It, a feature allowing customers to swap or upgrade proteins and ingredients within select recipes.

In 2023, Home Chef launched Home Chef’s Family Menu, a meal kit plan designed specifically for families, offering larger serving sizes.

In October 2023, Home Chef introduced Tempo, a ready-to-heat meal delivery service offering single-serve microwavable meals.

== Products ==
Home Chef’s primary offering is a weekly subscription meal kit delivery service. Customers select recipes online or through the mobile app and receive a delivery containing pre-portioned ingredients and step-by-step recipe instructions.

The service features a rotating weekly menu of 36 or more recipes. Customers can choose serving sizes, customize ingredients, and select add-ons. The subscription is flexible, allowing customers to skip weeks, pause, or cancel at any time.

Home Chef offers multiple meal kit formats, including:

- Classic meal kits
- Culinary Collection
- Oven-Ready
- Express
- Heat & Eat

Home Chef offers add-on items through its Extras section, including:

- Breakfast items
- Desserts
- Snacks
- Salads
- Pizzas
- Bread
- Soups
- Beverages
- Grab-and-go
- Protein packs

Home Chef offers recipes designed for a range of dietary preferences, including:

- Carb-conscious meals
- Calorie-conscious meals
- Protein-packed meals
- GLP-1 Support meals
- Gluten-smart meals

Home Chef’s Family Menu offers a dedicated plan for families. Customers can select from 2, 4, and 6-serving recipe options.

Home Chef’s Family Menu has meal categories including:

- Classic
- Oven-Ready
- Express
- Sheet Pan
- Chopped & Ready

== Sustainability ==
Home Chef emphasizes sustainable packaging and food waste reduction.

The company’s shipping boxes and dividers are made from partially recycled cardboard and are curbside recyclable. Meal bags (#5 plastic) and ingredient bags (#4 plastic) can be recycled at participating plastic bag recycling locations. Recipe cards are designed for reuse and are also curbside recyclable.

Home Chef partners with local nonprofit organizations near its distribution facilities to reduce food waste and support food security initiatives.

== Partnerships and collaborations ==
Home Chef has partnered with celebrity chefs, media brands, and influencers to create limited-time menus and promotions.

Notable partnerships include:

- Rachael Ray (2022)
- Dolly Parton (2024)
- Gordon Ramsay (2025)
- Giada De Laurentiis (2026)

== Awards and recognition ==
Home Chef and Home Chef’s Family Menu have received recognition in the industry.

- Home Chef named Best Overall Meal Kit Service by NBC Select
- Home Chef’s Family Menu named Parent-Tested, Parent-Approved winner by Parent Tested Parent Approved
- Home Chef was named Best Meal Service for Families by CNN Underscored
