= Grand Central (store) =

- Company type: Discount store
- Founded: 1928
- Founders: Maurice Warshaw
- Defunct: 1984
- Fate: Acquired by Fred Meyer
- Headquarters: Salt Lake City, Utah
- Number of locations: 31 (1984)
- Areas served: Arizona, Idaho, Nevada, New Mexico, Utah, Wyoming (1984)

Grand Central was a chain of discount department stores based in Salt Lake City, Utah. At its peak, the chain operated over 30 stores in Arizona, Idaho, Nevada, New Mexico, Utah, Wyoming. It was acquired by Portland, Oregon-based retailer Fred Meyer in 1984, which rebranded most of the Grand Central locations to Fred Meyer.

== History ==
Grand Central was founded by Russian immigrant Maurice Warshaw (1898 – January 5, 1979), who opened a produce stand on the corner of 900 South and Main Street in Salt Lake City, Utah in 1928. After finding success selling Kellogg's Corn Flakes, Warshaw expanded his business beyond produce by adding his own meat and grocery departments. In 1946, Warshaw partnered with his son, Keith, and son-in-law, Don Mackey, to expand the retailer to multiple locations. Maurice Warshaw left the company in the 1950s to focus on humanitarian work and left management duties to his son and Mackey. The chain then expanded to sell clothing, electric gadgets, hardware, kitchenware, medicine, and toys.

In 1960, Grand Central sold its food operations to Los Angeles, California-based Mayfair Markets. The chain entered Idaho through the acquisition of Bosko Super Stores from Boise-based grocery retailer Albertsons in June 1963. In 1971, the company went public.

In March 1984, Portland, Oregon-based retailer Fred Meyer announced the purchase of Grand Central for US$11 per share, a transactional value of nearly US$25 million. At the time, Grand Central operated 31 stores and employed about 2,900 people in Idaho, Nevada, New Mexico, Utah, and Wyoming. 21 stores in Idaho and Utah were rebranded by Fred Meyer, while stores in Nevada and Wyoming were closed. Seven stores in New Mexico were later acquired by Walmart in January 1985.
