= Fry's Food and Drug =

Supermarket chain

Fry's Food & Drug Stores, Inc.
- Type: Subsidiary
- Industry: Retail (Supermarket)
- Founded: 1954; 72 years ago in El Sobrante, California, U.S.
- Founder: Donald Fry
- Headquarters: Tolleson, Arizona, U.S.
- Number of locations: 123
- Area served: Central and Southern Arizona
- Key people: Monica Garnes (Fry's Division president); Micheal Cristal (vice president of retail operations); Christina Groth (vice president of Merchandising)
- Products: Bakery, dairy, delicatessen, frozen foods, general grocery, liquor, lottery, meats, pharmacy, produce, seafood and snacks
- Services: Supermarket and pharmacy
- Number of employees: 22,000
- Parent: Dillons (1972–1983); Kroger (1983–present)
- Divisions: Fry's Marketplace; Fry's Signature; Fry's Mercado
- Website: www.frysfood.com

Fry's Food and Drug is a chain of American supermarkets that has a major presence in the U.S. state of Arizona. Fry's also operates under the banner of Fry's Marketplace, a hypermarket or combination of groceries and general merchandise similar to sister subsidiary Fred Meyer. Fry's is a division of Kroger, an American retail company based in Cincinnati, Ohio.

Kroger also operates stores under the Smith's name in Northern Arizona and other states.

== History ==
=== Beginnings ===
Fry's was founded in 1954 by Donald Fry in El Sobrante, California. A marker placed at the intersection of San Pablo Dam Road and La Colina Rd identifies this spot. With the help of his brother Charles, the chain expanded into the Phoenix market in 1960. Fry's was sold in 1972 to Dillons, based in Hutchinson, Kansas. (Note: Some sources state that the sale was to Modesto-based Save Mart Supermarkets.) (The sons of Charles Fry used the proceeds from the sale to launch Fry's Electronics in 1985 and later shut down in 2021; it was otherwise separate from and unaffiliated with the grocery chain.) Dillons merged with Kroger in 1983.

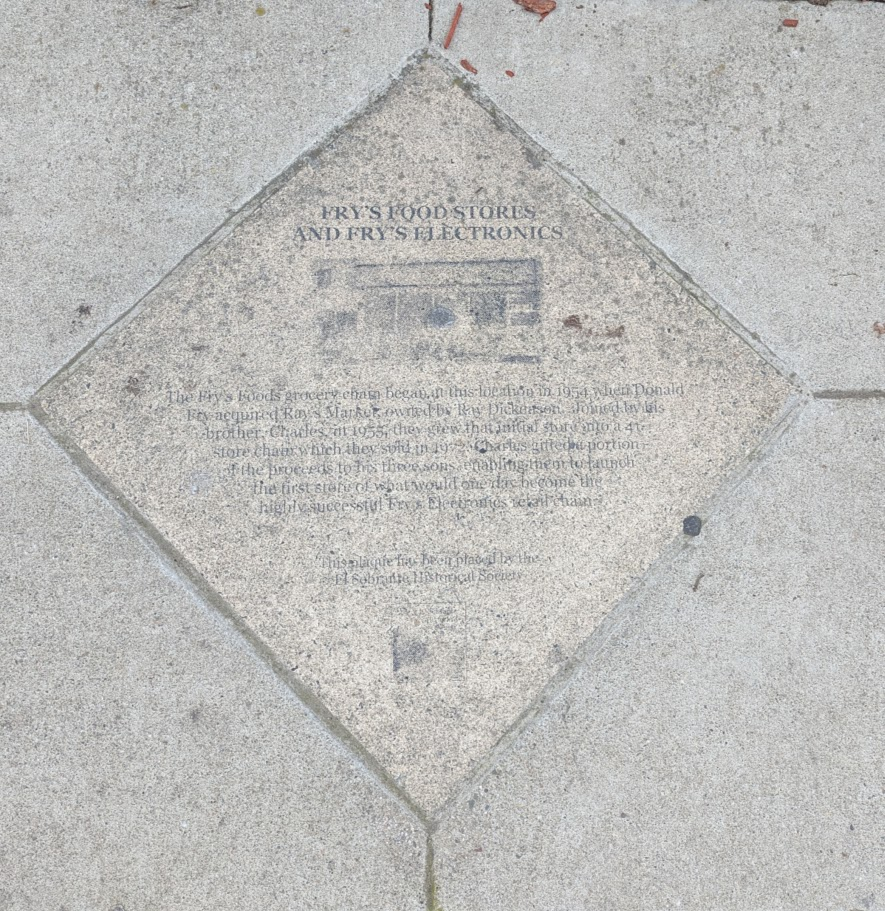
Marker identifying original Fry's location in El Sobrante, California

=== Fred Meyer and Kroger merger ===
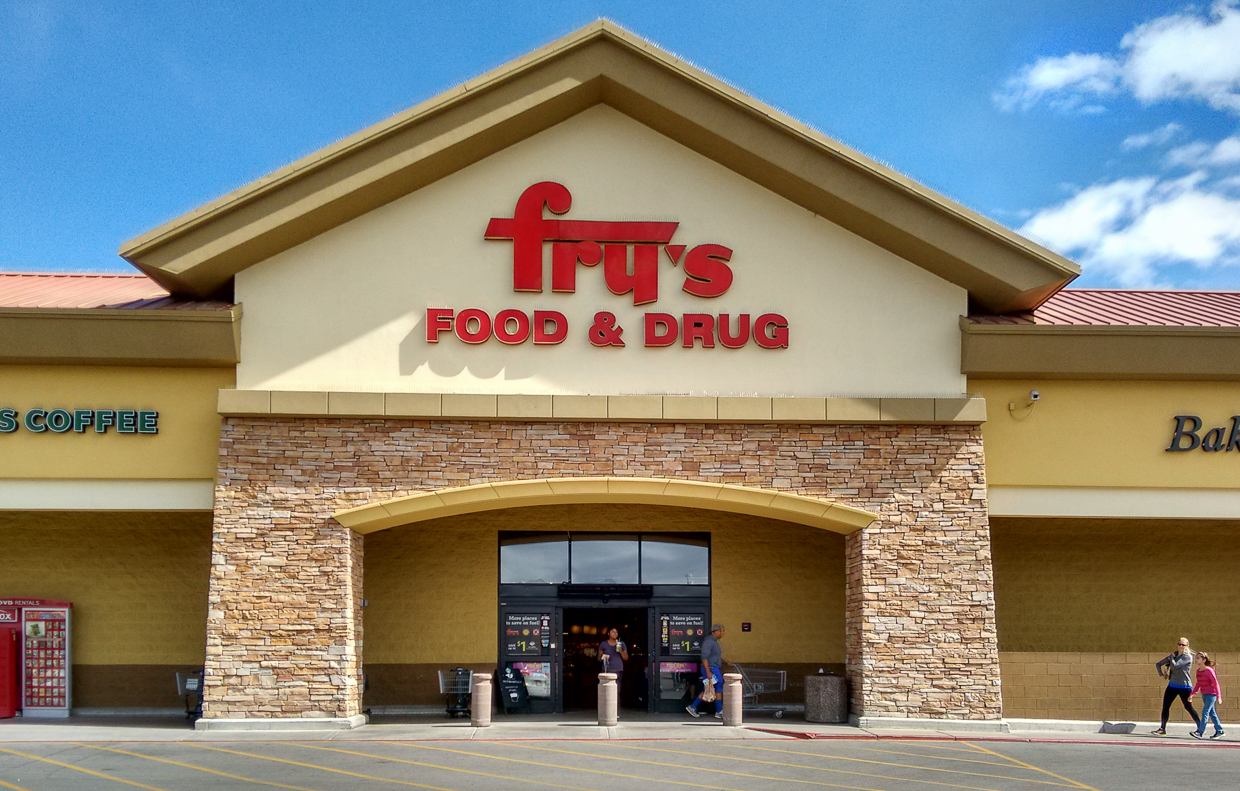
Typical Fry's Food and Drug Store in Sierra Vista, Arizona (Store #660-00059)

In October 1998, Fred Meyer, parent company of Smith's Food and Drug based in Salt Lake City, announced a strategic merger with Kroger, based in Cincinnati, Ohio. Several months later, in May 1999, the Federal Trade Commission (FTC) approved the merger of the two companies, named The Kroger Co.

Arizona and Texas were the only two of 31 states where there was an overlap of stores and brands from the merger. The Kroger Co., choosing to operate with one brand in the Arizona market, rebranded most Smith's Food & Drug Centers as Fry's Food & Drug Stores, though Smith's Food and Drug Centers in Bullhead City, Kingman and Lake Havasu City remained unchanged (perhaps because of their proximity to Nevada and the Las Vegas market, where Kroger retained the Smith's brand). Fry's Phoenix Distribution Center and administrative offices were moved into the more modern Smith's Food and Drug Distribution Center and office space in the west Phoenix suburb of Tolleson.

== Fry's Marketplace ==
Fry's Marketplace is a multi-department store that offers full-service grocery, pharmacy and general merchandise including outdoor living products, electronics, home goods and toys. Ranging in size from 80,000–105,000 square feet (7,400–9,800 m^{2}), the Marketplace stores are smaller than the original Fred Meyer stores. The Marketplace format was derived from the Fred Meyer concept but on a smaller scale and has since expanded to other Kroger divisions (Ohio, Virginia, Texas, etc.), including the Smith's Food & Drug Centers Division in Utah.

Fry's Marketplace started out as Smitty's, Arizona's first multi-department store. Smitty's was similar to a Walmart Supercenter (but on a smaller scale) and even had a food court with four branded fast food options (such as Taco Bell). Smitty's notably carried the President's Choice brand. In 1996, Smitty's merged with Smith's Food and Drug Centers. In 1997, after the Fred Meyer–Smith's merger, Fred Meyer updated and revitalized the Smitty's concept (naming the stores Smitty’s Marketplace) and in January 1999, all Smitty's stores were renamed Fred Meyer Marketplace, ending the Smitty’s name. During this time, management of Smitty’s changed from Smith's Food and Drug to Fred Meyer. Later that year, construction also started on a full size Fred Meyer store in Phoenix, at 35th Avenue and Bethany Home Road, with plans to build more Fred Meyer stores in the Phoenix metro.

In June 2000, Kroger transferred the management of all Fred Meyer stores in Arizona to Fry's Food and Drug. The Fred Meyer stores were rebranded as Fry's Marketplace, unifying the stores under the Fry's brand. The full size Fred Meyer store in Phoenix was completed but never opened and was later demolished to build a Walmart, as the store was too large for Fry's to use, with Fred Meyer’s expansion plans for Arizona scrapped.

== Fry's Signature ==
Fry's Signature is marketed as a high-end, neighborhood tailored grocery store. The aisles are longer and taller, and have expanded selections for kosher, kitchenware and wine as well as soup, salad and olive bars. One of the locations is on 20427 North Hayden Road in Scottsdale. Another Fry's Signature store is located at 10450 N. 90th Street in Scottsdale. There is also a Fry's Signature store at the cross streets of Cave Creek Rd and Carefree Hwy in Cave Creek. In addition, there is a Fry's Signature Marketplace at the intersection of Shea Blvd and Tatum Blvd in Scottsdale. There is another store located at the cross streets of Gavilan Peak Pkwy and Daisy Mountain Dr in the northern Phoenix suburb of Anthem.

== Fry's Mercado ==
Fry's Mercado is geared towards Arizona's large Hispanic market. It is located at 43rd Avenue and McDowell in Phoenix. There is a check cashing store, an agua fresca bar, a cocina (kitchen), and a gas station among other attractions at the location. Several other stores are sublet in the Fry's Mercado (including an electronics store, a women's clothing store, and a barber shop).

== Fry's Fuel ==
Fry's offers fuel at some of its retail locations.
