= Fred Meyer =

American hypermarket store

Fred Meyer, Inc.
- Type: Subsidiary
- Industry: Retail
- Founded: 1922; 104 years ago, in Portland, Oregon, United States
- Founder: Fred G. Meyer
- Headquarters: Portland, Oregon
- Number of locations: 132 (2024)
- Areas served: Washington, Oregon, Idaho and Alaska
- Key people: Todd Kammeyer (president)
- Products: Grocery, drugstore, bank, clothing, jewelry, home decor, home improvement, garden, electronics, restaurant, shoes, sporting goods and toys
- Revenue: US$ 4.897 billion
- Parent: Kohlberg Kravis Roberts (1981–1998); Kroger (1998–present)
- Website: www.fredmeyer.com

Fred Meyer, Inc. is an American chain of hypermarket superstores and subsidiary of Kroger based in Portland, Oregon. The stores operate in the northwestern United States, with locations in Oregon, Washington, Idaho, and Alaska. The company was founded in 1922 by Fred G. Meyer in Portland. The chain was one of the first in the country to promote one-stop shopping, eventually combining a complete grocery supermarket with a drugstore, bank, clothing, jewelry, home decor, home improvement, garden, electronics, restaurant, shoes, sporting goods, and toys. Fred Meyer was acquired by Kroger in 1998, but the stores retained the Fred Meyer name.

Fred Meyer is the parent company of Fred Meyer Jewelers.

== History ==
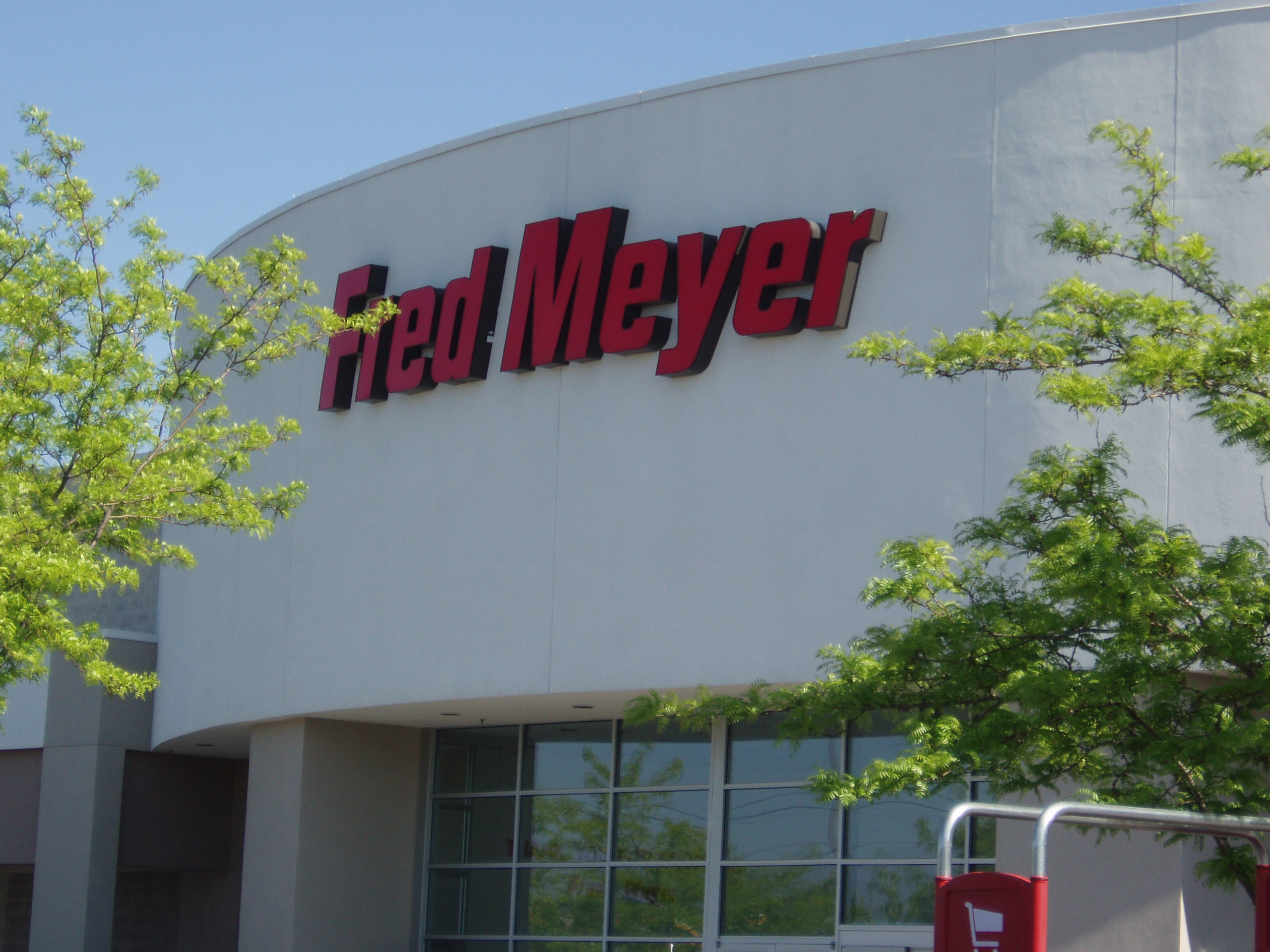
A Fred Meyer store in the 2000s.

=== 1920s–1950s: beginnings ===
In 1922, the first Fred Meyer store opened in Portland at the corner of SW 5th Ave & Yamhill St. The store combined separate shops under one roof such as meat, produce, cheese, and other merchandise. Meyer's vision was to give customers more reasons to shop in his store than in any other.

The first suburban one-stop shopping center opened in 1931 in the Hollywood District of Portland, a neighborhood he deliberately chose through an application of market research: he would pay customers' overtime parking tickets that they incurred while shopping at his downtown store, just to obtain their home addresses. The store's innovations included a grocery store alongside a drugstore plus home products, off-street parking, gas station, and eventually, clothing. Fred G. Meyer would base store locations on planned highway construction.

In 1951, the Fred Meyer Company built a large warehouse near Providence Portland Medical Center in Laurelhurst, despite complaints and controversy from neighbors and the city council. Neighbors did not want large truck volume in their city, but the area was already zoned for industrial and commercial east of 44th Avenue. The huge warehouse was built to the detriment of the Banfield Expressway, built in Sullivan's Gulch less than five years later. The warehouse had to be condemned and partially destroyed for the freeway, with the state highway commission selling the remaining sections to the Bemis Company. The Fred Meyer Company moved to Swan Island on land formerly occupied by wartime housing for Kaiser Shipyards.

=== 1960s–1970s: first acquisitions and founder's death ===
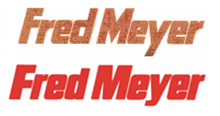
Previous Fred Meyer logos

In the 1960s, Fred Meyer entered the Seattle market by acquiring Seattle-based Marketime Drugs. Fred Meyer also acquired a Spokane-based grocery wholesaler, The Roundup Company. Roundup owned no stores in Spokane but owned Kalispell, Montana-based B&B stores in northwest Montana and Consumer Warehouse Foods in Soap Lake, Washington.

By March 1968, Fred Meyer, Inc., was operating in four states—Oregon, Washington, Idaho, and Montana—and had 48 retail stores.

In 1973, Fred Meyer acquired all five Oregon stores of the Valu-Mart discount chain (formerly known as Villa-Mart in Oregon) from its parent company, Seattle-based Weisfield's, Inc. The following year, Weisfield's leased its remaining stores (renamed "Leslie's"), in 1975. According to an article published in the business section of The Seattle Times on August 10, 1975, Fred Meyer signed long-term leases with most of the 21 Weisfield's-owned stores (Tacoma and Everett locations were not acquired). Some of the properties may have been purchased by Fred Meyer at the time in the Oregon market but Weisfield's maintained existing leases on properties in the Seattle/Tacoma market since leases for the grocery sections (leased to Associated Grocers in 1973) and other smaller businesses within the stores were kept. Kroger acquired these properties from Weisfield during the 1990s and 2000s. Some of these properties such as the Greenwood and Midway locations were demolished to rebuild the locations. In 1975, Fred Meyer opened its first stores in Alaska as a result of acquiring Leslie's/Valu-Mart and changed the Leslie's/Valu-Mart stores to the Fred Meyer banner. As Fred Meyer became better known in the Seattle area, the Marketime Drug chain became known as Fred Meyer-Marketime. While Fred Meyer was building new stores in Washington state some smaller discount stores in the state would lease a portion of their stores to Fred Meyer as well such as The Hi-Ho Shopping Center in Puyallup and the Yard Birds Shopping Center in Centralia.

In January 1976, as part of a pressure campaign to support the eight-lane design of I-205, Fred G. Meyer announced plans to build a Fred Meyer store and motel in the Gateway area.

In 1977, Marketime was renamed Fred Meyer. In the mid-1980s, the northwest Montana B&B stores also acquired the Fred Meyer name.

On September 2, 1978, Fred G. Meyer died at the age of 92. Until his death, Meyer continued to play an active role in the day-to-day operation of his company. Also in 1978, Fortune placed Fred Meyer as the 45th largest retail company by sales. The chain had over $1 billion in sales in 1979.

=== 1980s–1990s: additional expansion and California retreat ===
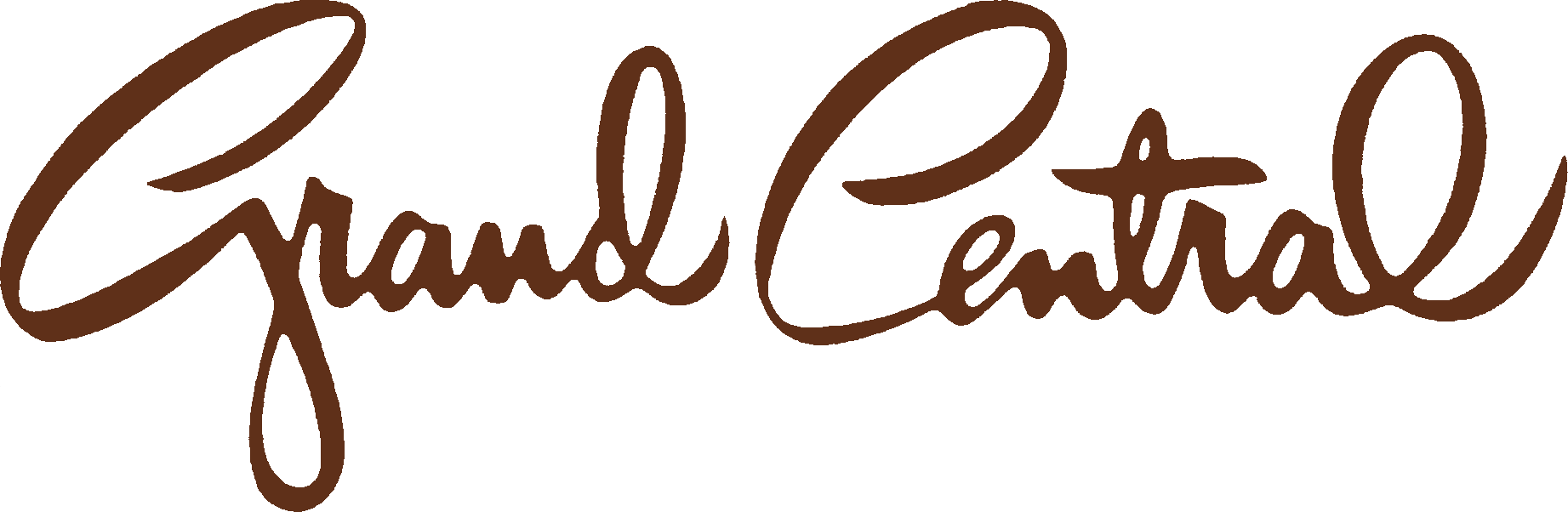
Grand Central stores were acquired by Fred Meyer in 1984

In 1981, the company was purchased by Kohlberg Kravis Roberts in what was one of KKR's first major leveraged buyouts. As of May 1988, the chain had 99 stores in six states.

In 1984, Fred Meyer acquired Grand Central of Salt Lake City, Utah. The Grand Central stores in Utah and Idaho were converted to Fred Meyer stores, although most did not receive full supermarket departments until the mid-1990s.

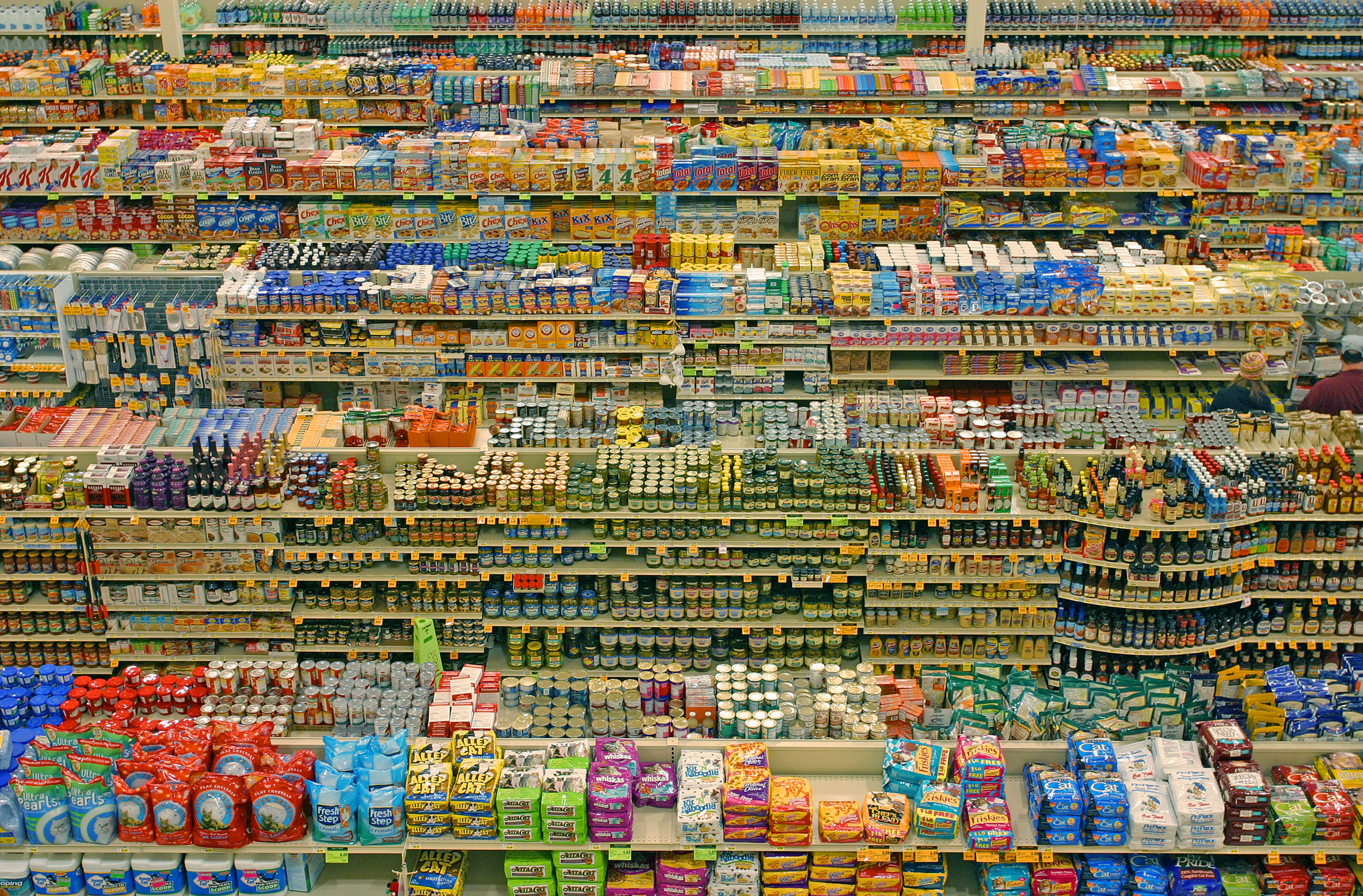
Packaged food aisles at the Fred Meyer location at Interstate Avenue and Lombard Street in Portland (Store #701-00150).

In the 1990s Fred Meyer expanded into California by opening a store in Chico. Plans had been made to open a store in Redding and expand into Sacramento with several sites having been acquired. Eventually, the Chico location was closed and sold, and the Sacramento sites sold; the Redding site eventually became a Walmart store in 1996.

In 1997, Fred Meyer acquired Smith's Food and Drug of Salt Lake City, though both companies maintained separate operations. The same year, Fred Meyer acquired Ralphs of Los Angeles, California, and QFC of Seattle. Both acquisitions also maintained separate operations with Fred Meyer as the holding company. In that fast string of mergers, Fred Meyer quickly became the nation's fifth largest food and drug store operator.

In 1997, Fred Meyer converted its Columbia Falls and Kalispell stores in Montana into Smith's Food & Drug Stores and closed its Polson location. In 2001, the Kalispell store was demolished and replaced with a newer Smith's location adjacent to the older, obsolete store. The Columbia Falls store retained the Fred Meyer decor (with Smith's logos over the old Fred Meyer logos) but only contained a grocery department, with none of the other departments or product offerings.

In 1998, Fred Meyer was acquired by Kroger of Cincinnati, Ohio. Before the acquisition, it traded on the New York Stock Exchange under the ticker symbol FMY.

=== 2000s–2010s: Fred Meyer as a Kroger subsidiary ===
In 2000, the Arizona Fred Meyer stores, all of which were formerly Smith's stores that Fred Meyer acquired in the Smith's merger, were rebranded as Fry's Marketplace.

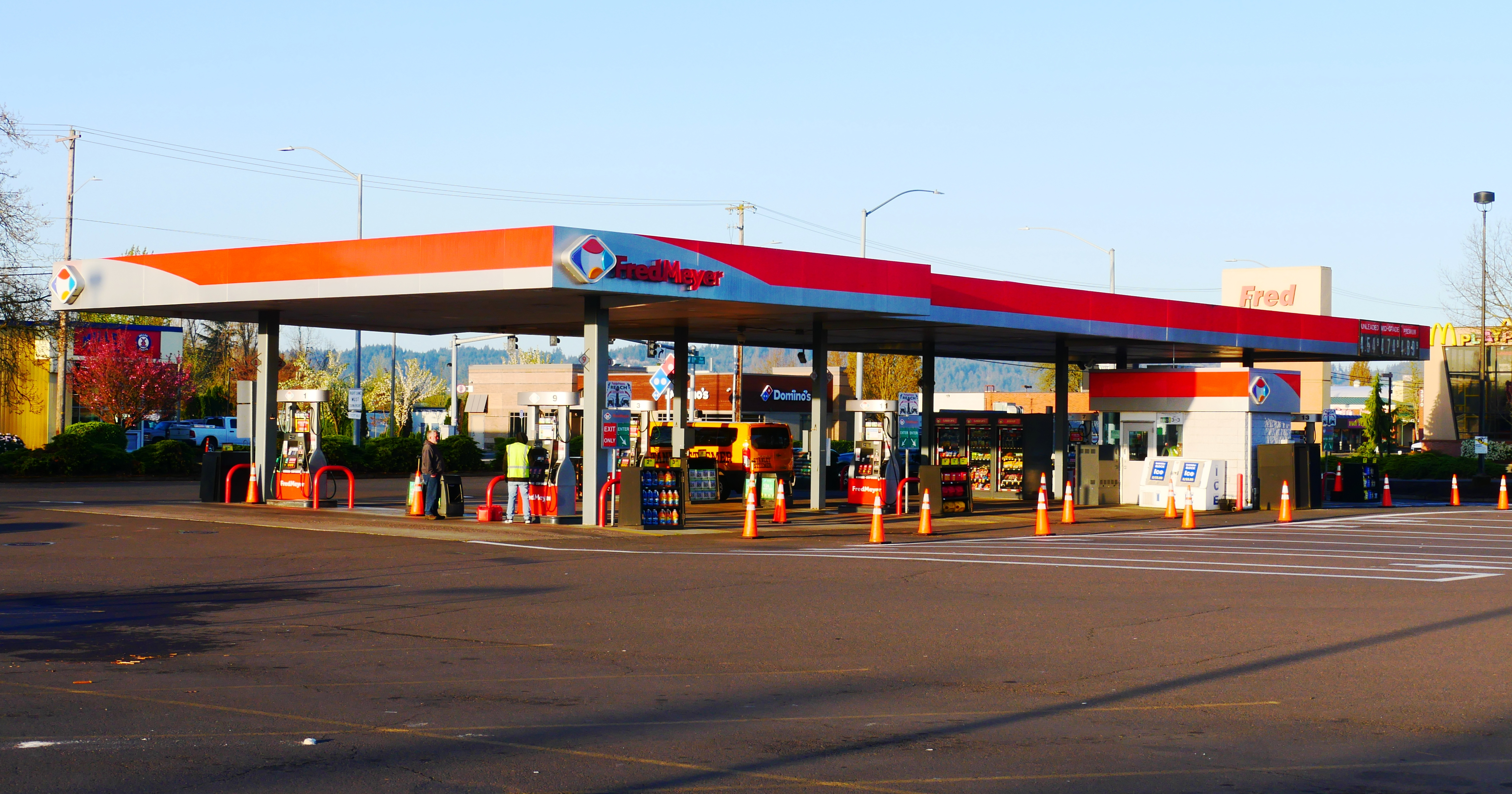
A Fred Meyer fuel station in Eugene, Oregon

In 2004, Smith's Food and Drug assumed the operations of the Utah Fred Meyer stores, which were rebranded as Smith's Marketplace. Also, since the acquisition of the Fred Meyer Company, Kroger has been unifying standards across the company, adopting many of the Fred Meyer store standards, and implementing their own standards to the Fred Meyer stores. Kroger and Fred Meyer stores are slowly becoming more similar in management and merchandising.

Additionally, one Fred Meyer in Seattle in the Capitol Hill neighborhood merged its operations with QFC which had a grocery store across the street from the Broadway Market. This particular Fred Meyer, probably the smallest one in the chain, had only personal care and home health items, along with general merchandise, but no food or apparel. This store is now a QFC Marketplace, the only one of its kind, but it is not signed as such.

In July 2010, Fred Meyer announced it would no longer offer plastic bags at any of its 10 Portland stores. It was the largest retail chain in the Portland metropolitan area to adopt such a policy prior to the City of Portland banning the use of plastic bags in October 2011.

In March 2018, Fred Meyer dropped guns and ammunition from product offering. Shortly before the discontinuation, it limited the sale to 21 and over.
