= Fred Meyer Jewelers =

US jewellery chain

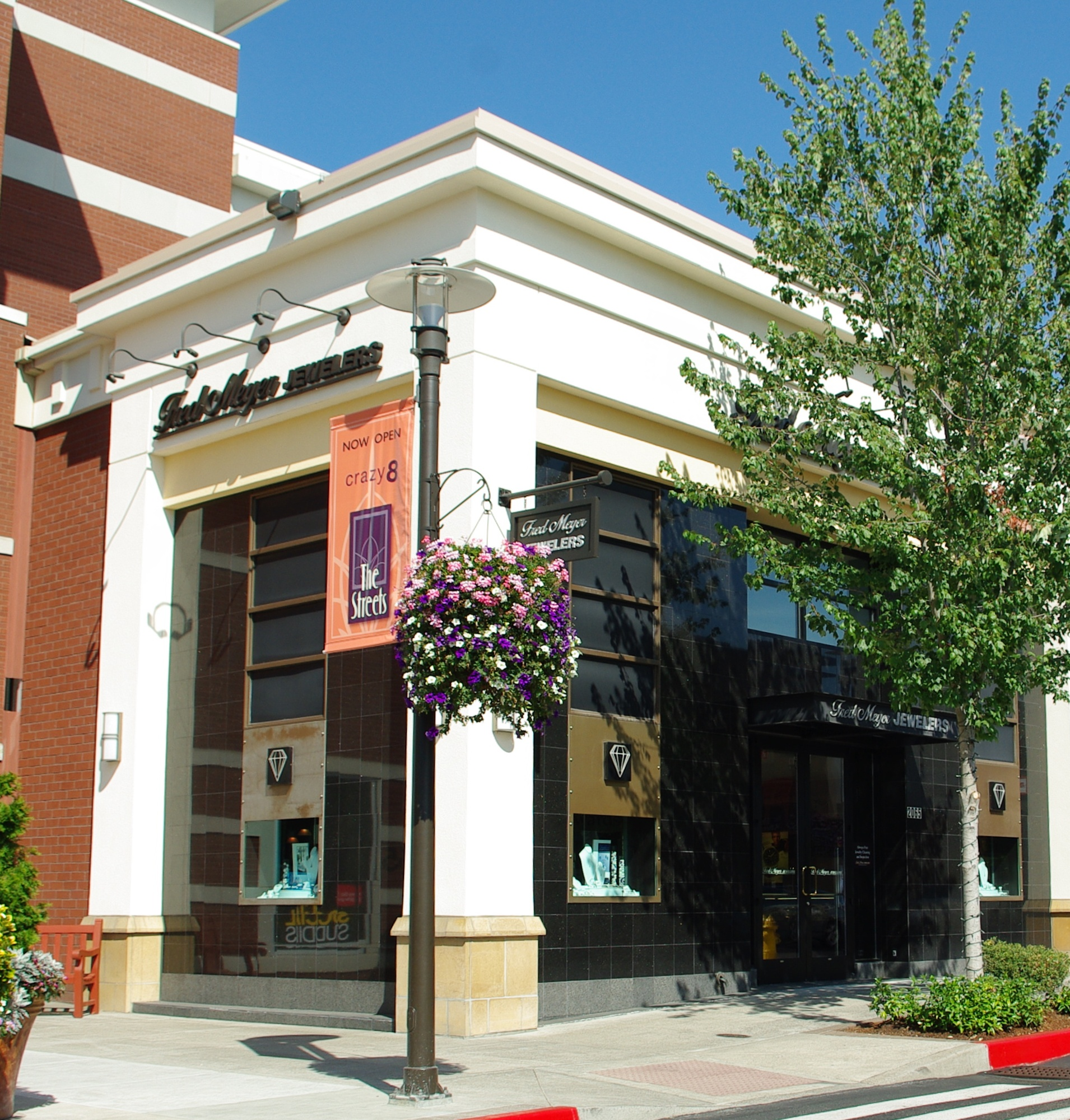
- A former Fred Meyer Jewelers store in Hillsboro, Oregon
- Company type: Subsidiary
- Industry: Retail
- Founded: 1973; 53 years ago
- Headquarters: Portland, Oregon
- Number of locations: 260+ (2018)
- Products: Jewelry
- Parent: Fred Meyer
- Website: www.fredmeyerjewelers.com

Fred Meyer Jewelers is an American chain of jewelry stores. It is owned by Fred Meyer, which is a subsidiary of Kroger. The company also formerly operated under the name Littman Jewelers.

Fred Meyer Jewelers operates across the United States in stores, in malls, and online. The corporate main office is located in Portland, Oregon.

== History ==
In 1973, Fred Meyer Jewelers started as a catalog showroom concept by Fred G. Meyer. As the catalog showroom fad started to die down, Fred Meyer was experiencing excellent sales growth in the fine jewelry category. To capitalize on this sales growth, Fred Meyer placed fine jewelry stores in their large multi-department stores and eventually shopping malls throughout the Western United States.

In 1995, Fred Meyer Jewelers acquired 23 jewelers operating in California and the Midwestern United States, as well as Merksamer Jewelers. Eventually all of those acquisitions took the name Fred Meyer Jewelers.

In 1997, Fred Meyer Jewelers acquired the chain of Fox's Jewelers that operated in six Midwestern states. Fox's Jewelers were eventually renamed Fred Meyer Jewelers.

In October 1998, Fred Meyer Jewelers acquired the Littman Jewelers chain that operated in the eastern United States. Unlike other acquisitions, Littman stores continued to operate under this name instead of Fred Meyer Jewelers.

In 1999, Fred Meyer, Inc., the parent company of Fred Meyer Jewelers, was acquired by The Kroger Company.

In 2020 and 2021, Fred Meyer Jewelers closed 71 stores, including all of their Littman Jewelers branded locations.

== See also ==
- Fred Meyer
- Kroger
