= JayC Food Stores =

American supermarket chain

- Company type: Subsidiary
- Industry: Retail / Grocery
- Founded: 1863; 163 years ago in Seymour, Indiana
- Founder: John C. Groub
- Headquarters: Seymour, Indiana, U.S.
- Number of locations: 64 (2021)
- Key people: Mark Combs (CEO)
- Products: Bakery, dairy, delicatessen, dry cleaning, frozen foods, fuel, grocery, lottery, pharmacy, photographic processing, produce, meats, snack food, liquor, flowers, and Western Union
- Services: Supermarket
- Revenue: US$38 million
- Number of employees: 300 (2021)
- Parent: Kroger (1999–present)
- Website: www.jaycfoods.com

JayC Food Stores is an American supermarket chain based in Seymour, Indiana. As of May 2021, the chain operates 64 stores in Southern Indiana. JayC has been a division of Kroger since 1999.

== History ==
=== Early history ===
JayC was founded in 1863 by Swiss immigrant John C. Groub, who, with his wife Elizabeth, opened the chain's first store on South Chestnut Street in the city of Seymour. The success of the business allowed them to move to larger premises in 1871 and add a wholesale department. Profits by 1885 had reached US$80,000. John C. Groub died in 1888, passing the management of the company to his son Theodore and his son-in-law William Masters, an experienced grocer. Theodore later handed the running of the company to his sons Thomas and John.

The company's grocery wholesale business waned in the 1910s and 1920s, prompting the company to concentrate more on retail. Under the name of JayC Food Store of Scottsburg, adopted in 1927, the company grew to a peak of 44 retail locations in the 1940s. From the 1960s to the 1980s, JayC reduced the number of locations it operated and expanded the size of those it kept to offer a wider selection of foods. By 1994, JayC had 900 employees, and by 1997 had grown to more than 2,700, making it the largest private retail employer in Indiana. By the end of 1998, the company operated 30 stores, including three Foods Plus locations and three Ruler Foods store locations (JayC's discount banner).

=== Acquisition by Kroger ===
In January 1999, the John C. Groub Co. was acquired by Kroger, which continues to operate 22 JayC locations. The Foods Plus stores have been renamed to JayC Plus. Under the ownership of Kroger, the JayC division grew its Ruler Foods brand to 13 stores at the end of 2012, including the first store outside of Indiana. Some of the added Ruler Foods were conversions from the JayC brand, which has 23 stores at the end of 2012.

=== Today ===
As of 2018, JayC has been included in the Kroger Louisville division, with Ruler Foods now having its own division.
