= Pay Less Super Markets =

Supermarket chain in Indiana, United States

Pay Less Super Markets, Inc.

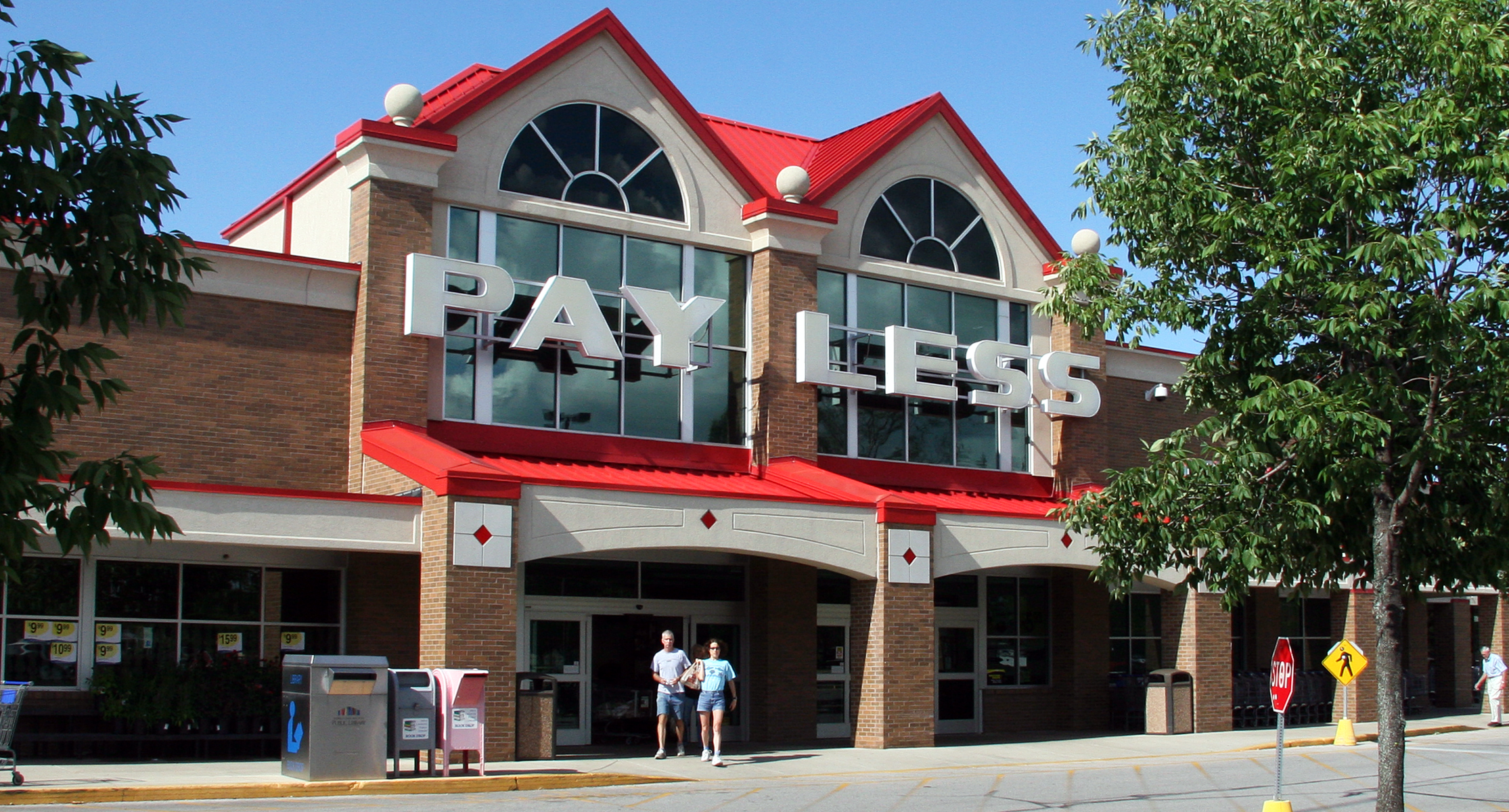
- Location in West Lafayette, Indiana
- Company type: Subsidiary
- Industry: Retail
- Founded: 1947; 79 years ago in Anderson, Indiana
- Founder: H. J. ‘‘Bud’’ Contos
- Number of locations: 9 (2018)
- Area served: Central Indiana
- Products: Bakery, dairy, deli, floral, frozen food, general grocery, hot food, housewares, liquor, meat, pet supplies, pharmacy, produce, seafood, snacks, stationery
- Parent: Kroger (1999–present)
- Website: www.pay-less.com

Pay Less Super Markets is a chain of nine supermarkets located in the central Indiana towns of Anderson, Lafayette, Muncie, and West Lafayette. There were two Pay Less grocery stores in Omaha that only lasted two years before being taken over by Cub Foods. Pay Less is a wholly owned subsidiary of The Kroger Co.

== History ==
The company was founded by H. J. Contos in 1947 in Anderson, Indiana. In 1960, a second store was opened in Lafayette, Indiana. Contos died in 1961, and the company was taken over by his son, Larry D. Contos. The company was acquired by The Kroger Company in 1999. Kroger today continues to operate the Pay Less banner under its central division, which included Owen's Market until that chain's phase-out in August 2020.

In July 2017, Kroger announced plans to convert two former Marsh Supermarkets in Muncie that it had just purchased from the bankrupt company to the Pay Less brand. The first of the two new stores opened in May 2018.
