= Owen's Market =

American grocery store chain

Owen's Market, Inc.
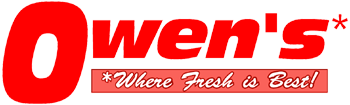
- Type: Subsidiary
- Industry: Retail
- Founded: 1938; 82 years ago
- Founder: Owen Emerick
- Defunct: August 17, 2020; 6 years ago
- Fate: Remaining locations rebranded as Kroger
- Products: Bakery, dairy, deli, frozen foods, general grocery, meat, pharmacy, produce, seafood, snacks, liquor
- Parent: Kroger

Owen's Market was a small chain of grocery stores located in northern Indiana in the United States, owned by the Kroger corporation. Founded in 1938. At the time of the chain name's phase-out in August 2020, there were three Owen's Market locations in the Indiana communities of Huntington, Ligonier and Warsaw. On August 17, 2020, Owen's website became a redirect to kroger.com, and the three stores were rebranded as Kroger the same week, marking the end of the Owen's name.
