= Michael Haft =

American businessman and veteran

- Born: November 3, 1986 (age 39)
- Alma mater: Washington University in St. Louis
- Spouse: Sofia Rose Haft
- Relatives: Robert Haft (Father); Herbert Haft (Grandfather)
- Military career
- Allegiance: United States
- Branch: United States Marine Corps
- Service years: 2009-2013
- Rank: Captain
- Commands: 1st Battalion 9th Marines, Weapons Platoon, Charlie Company
- Conflicts: War on Terror; War in Afghanistan
- Other work: Compass Coffee (founder)

Michael Haft (born November 3, 1986) is an American businessman, veteran and venture capitalist, known as the CEO and founder of Compass Coffee. He was deployed as United States Marine Corps Infantry Officer in Afghanistan.

== Early life and education ==
Haft was born on November 3, 1986, in Washington DC to businessman Robert Haft and Mary Haft. He attended the Maret School in Washington DC. Later, he received a Bachelor of Science in Business Administration (BSBA) with a focus on Business and Entrepreneurship from Washington University in St. Louis.

== Career ==
=== Military service ===
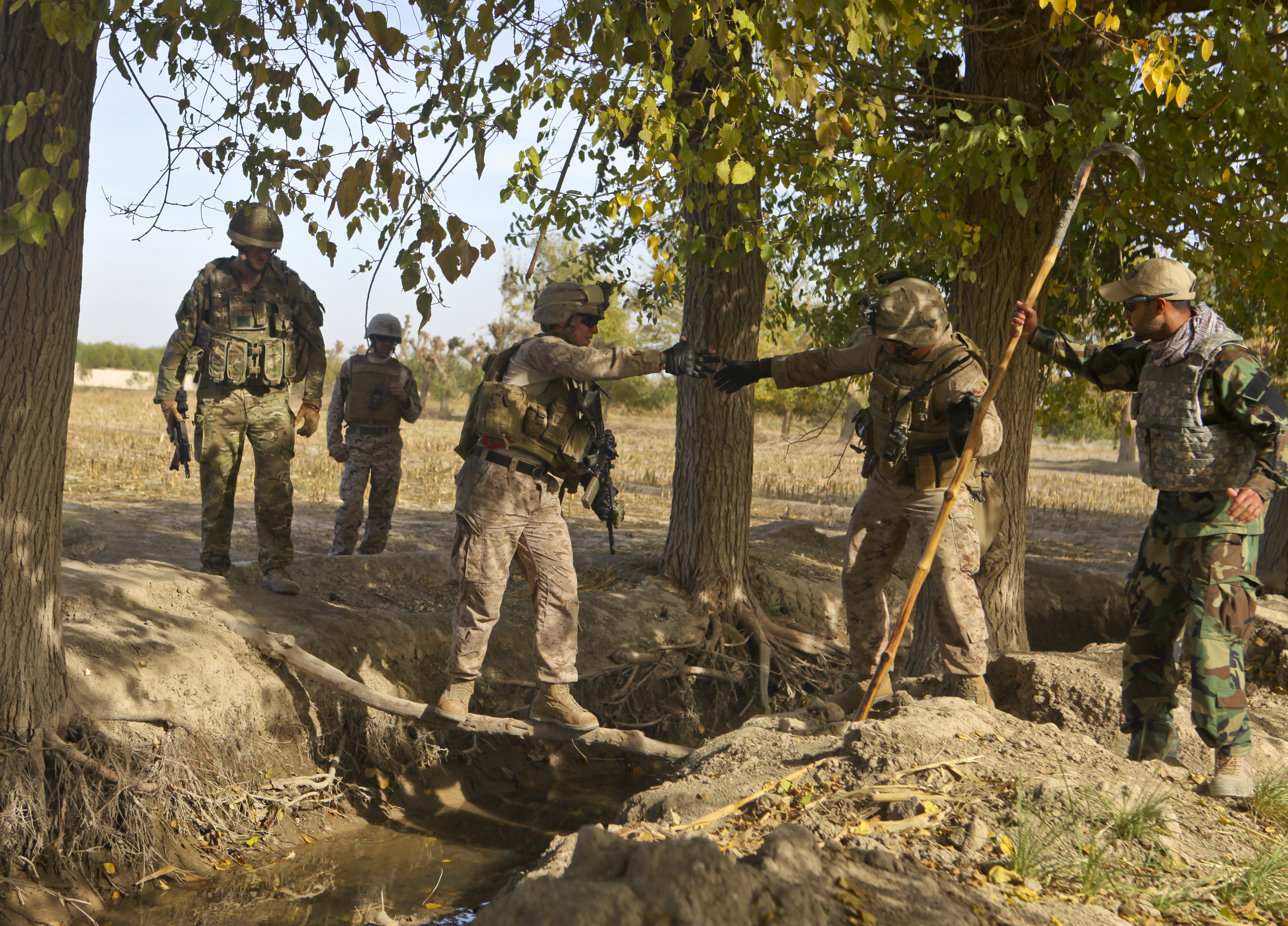
U.S. Marine Corps 1st Lt. Michael Haft with Company C, 1st Battalion, 9th Marines walks across a canal and reaches out to Sgt. Christopher Leonard while on patrol in Nawa, Helmand province, Afghanistan.

In 2009, after his junior year at Washington University in St. Louis, Haft attended the Officer Candidates School (United States Marine Corps) and was commissioned a second lieutenant upon graduating college the following year.

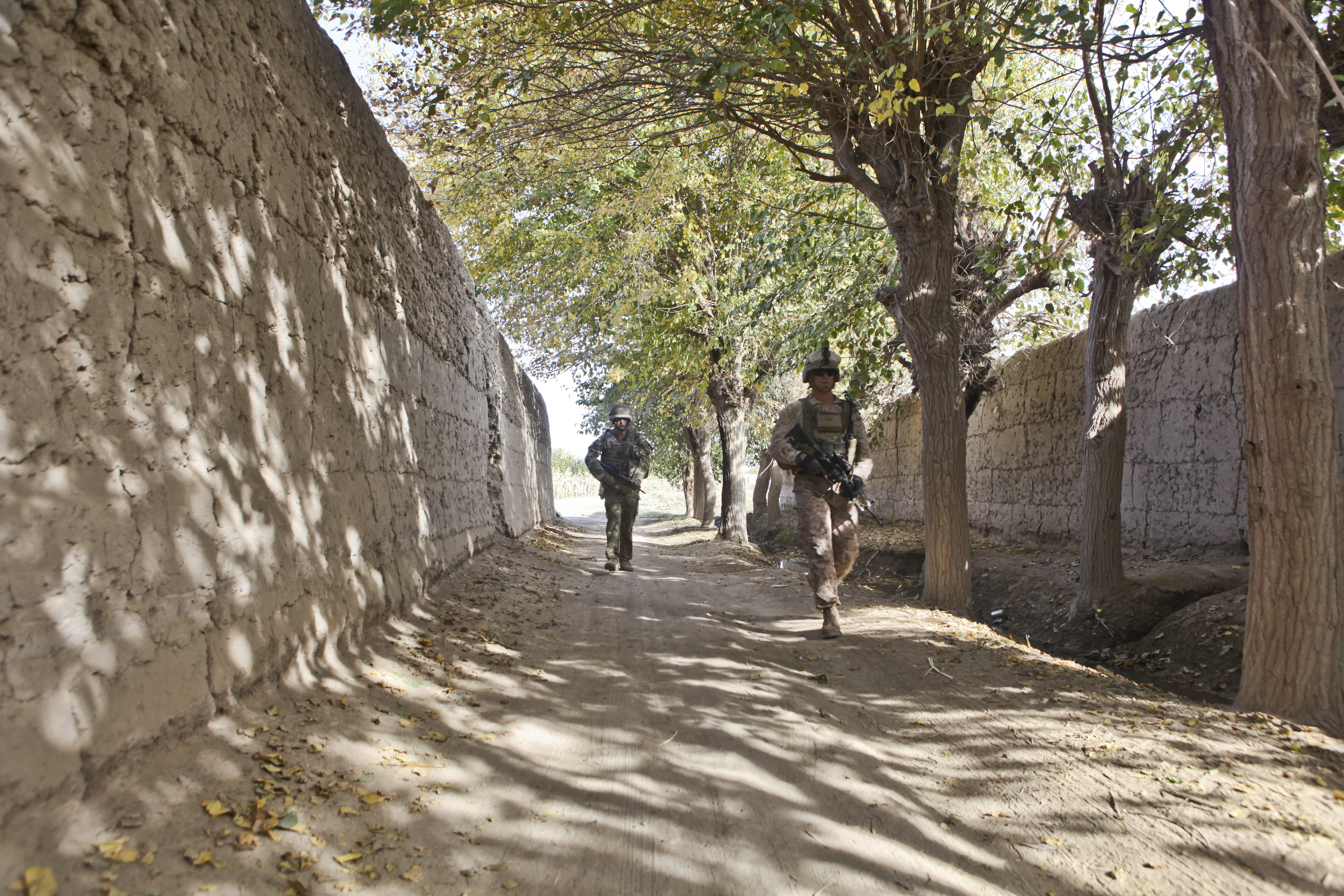
U.S. Marine Corps 1st Lt. Michael Haft with Company C, 1st Battalion, 9th Marines and British Army Capt. Emile Simpson patrol in Nawa, Helmand province, Afghanistan.

Haft was trained as an infantry officer and was eventually assigned as a weapons platoon commander to 1st Battalion, 9th Marines. Haft led his platoon in Afghanistan for Operation Enduring Freedom to support the War on Terror embedded with the Afghan National Police in the Helmand Province during 2011.

=== Compass Coffee ===
After his military service, Haft returned to Washington DC where he founded Compass Coffee in 2013. During the COVID-19 pandemic, he oversaw the construction of a 50,000-square-foot state-of-the-art roastery in the Ivy City neighborhood of Washington, D.C., with a capacity to produce 10 million pounds of coffee annually. The company received approximately $3.1 million in two Paycheck Protection Program loans to maintain operations during the pandemic.

=== Made in DC ===
Haft designed the Made in DC logo and has testified before the Council of the District of Columbia on manufacturing and business issues.

== Publications ==
Michael Haft is the co-author of a book, Perfect Coffee At Home.

== Personal life ==
Michael has been married to Sofia Haft, who is the director of communications at Anduril Industries and a public affairs officer in the US Navy Reserve. Michael received DC Chamber of Commerce's Community Impact Award in 2017.

== See also ==
- Compass Coffee
- Robert Haft
- Herbert Haft
