= Compass Coffee =

Washington D.C.-based coffee roaster

- Company type: Private
- Industry: Coffee roaster
- Founded: July 2014; 11 years ago Shaw, Washington, D.C., United States
- Founder: Michael Haft
- Headquarters: Washington, D.C., United States
- Number of employees: 190 (2020)
- Parent: Caffè Nero
- Website: compasscoffee.com

Compass Coffee is an American coffee roaster and coffeehouse chain based in Washington, D.C. It was founded in 2014 and operates in Washington, D.C., and Virginia. As of June 2024, the company has 18 stores.

== History ==
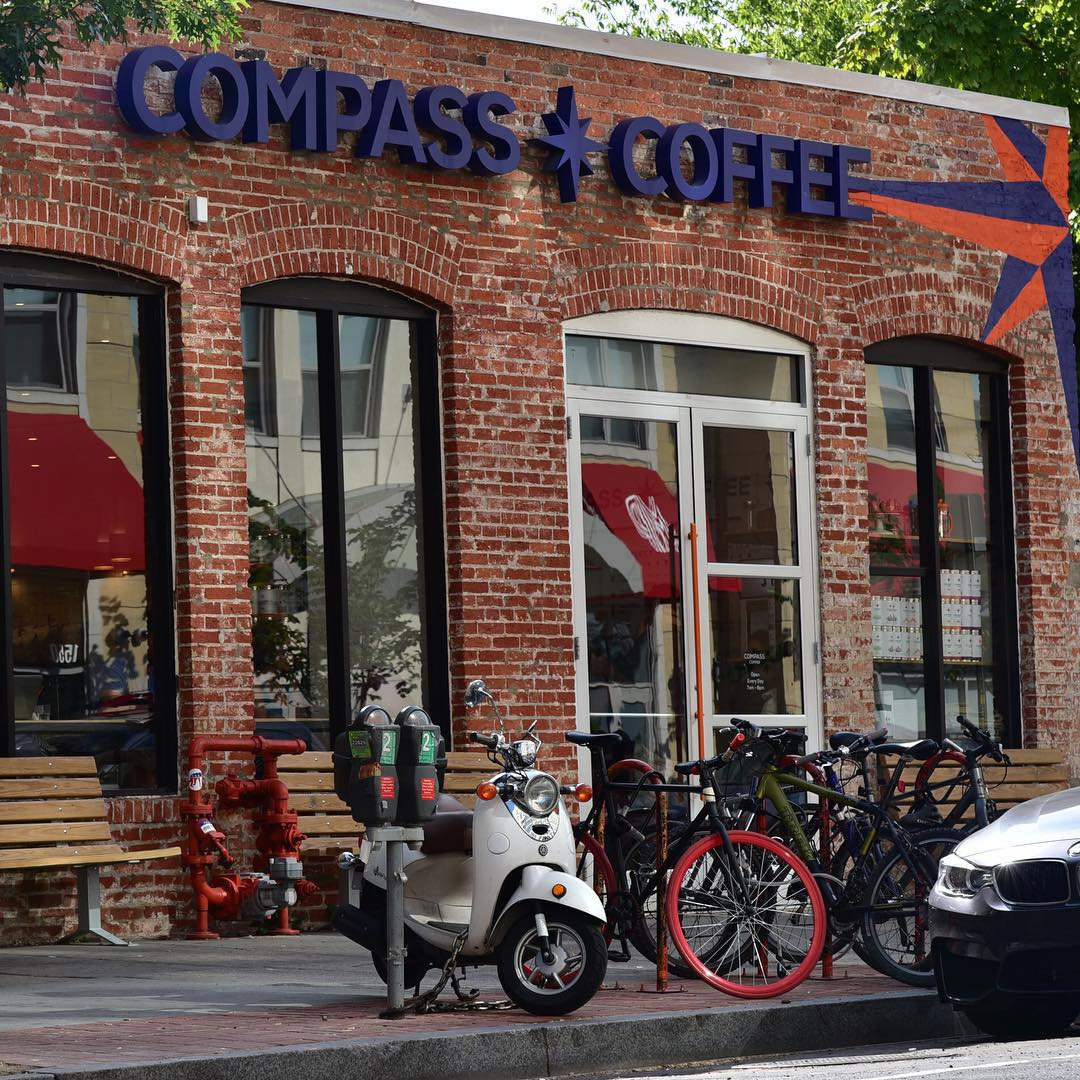
Store in Shaw, Washington, D.C.

The company was founded by Michael Haft in 2014. Following the Shaw neighborhood store, a second store was opened in the same neighborhood in September 2015. Over the next few years, other stores were opened in Washington, D.C., and Arlington, Virginia. The first drive-through store was opened in October 2022.

On October 20, 2017, Compass Coffee founder Michael Haft received the District of Columbia Chamber of Commerce's Community Impact Award at the 2017 Chamber's Choice Gala. On March 31, 2017, Compass Coffee was featured in DC Mayor Muriel Bowser's State of the District Address for jump-starting the Made in DC movement and creating jobs in DC.

On January 6, 2026, Compass Coffee filed for Chapter 11 bankruptcy protection amid facing several lawsuits with its landlords over unpaid rent. The company plans to sell itself to investors, while closing 11 out of its 20 locations in the process. On February 19, 2026, Caffè Nero submitted the $2.9 million winning bid for the company's assets pending bankruptcy court approval.

== Partnerships ==
Compass Coffee has partnered with Dog Tag Bakery, which offers a vocational program teaching disabled military veterans and their caregivers entrepreneurship skills to launch businesses. Compass supplies the bakery with coffee, and Michael Haft serves as a guest speaker with each cohort. Compass has also formed a partnership with The Corp at Georgetown University, which is a student-run organization that teaches students management and leadership skills through operating businesses on campus. Compass has been supplying The Corp since 2015.

The Washington Post and Compass Coffee collaborated on "The Post Roast", a coffee blend celebrating The 7, the Post's newsletter and podcast, reaching over a million subscribers and being recognized as Apple's top series of 2022.

== Impact of COVID-19 ==
In March 2020, due to the COVID-19 pandemic, Compass laid off 150 of its 189 employees. The remaining 39 staff members had their pay cut to $15 per hour, and 20 of them were tasked with working on the construction of a new roasting facility. The company also eliminated the option for customers to tip when paying by credit card, which decreased worker wages. Compass received over $9.9 million in government assistance during this time.

== Controversies ==
In May 2024, workers at seven Compass locations announced their intent to unionize with Workers United. In June 2024, Compass Coffee United accused the company of hiring 124 additional people, including Liz Brown, a lobbyist for Uber, and Cullen Gilchrist, the CEO and co-founder of Union Kitchen, and of manipulating schedules retroactively to make it appear as though the newly hired employees were eligible to vote in the union election. In response, US Senator Bernie Sanders publicly criticized the company on X (formerly Twitter), labeling the company's actions "totally absurd & disgusting" and calling on the company to "end its union busting."
