= Currence (surname) =

Currence is a surname. Notable people with the surname include:

- Anna Currence, American businesswoman
- John Currence, American chef
- J'Zavien Currence (born 2007), American football player
- Lafayette Currence (born 1951), American baseball player
- Rudy Currence, American singer, songwriter, producer, and keyboardist
