= Open Arts Network =

The Open Arts Network was a national network of membership-based arts organizations with the goals of sharing resources and reducing duplication of effort. The Open Arts Network was started by Fractured Atlas in 2004. Fractured Atlas discontinued the network in 2017.

As of May 2007, the following organizations were members of the Open Arts Network:

- Fractured Atlas
- 3rd Ward
- ACCI Gallery
- Art for Progress
- Artfag Mafia
- ArtistShare
- Asian American Arts Alliance
- Atlanta Coalition of Performing Arts
- Austin Circle of Theaters
- Black Rock Coalition
- Children's Museum of the Arts
- College Art Association
- Columbia University School of the Arts Alumni Association
- Dance Theater Workshop
- Elizabeth Foundation for the Arts
- The Field
- International Forum of Visual Practitioners
- Lower Manhattan Cultural Council
- New York Folklore Society
- Shooting People
- Theatre Bay Area
- Theatre Puget Sound
- Williamsburg Gallery Association
- Women's Caucus for Art
