= Third Ward =

3rd Ward may refer to:

== Places ==
Canada

- Barrhaven Ward, Ottawa (also known as Ward 3)

United States

- 3rd Ward of New Orleans, a ward of New Orleans, Louisiana
- Historic Third Ward, Milwaukee, a historic district of Milwaukee, Wisconsin
- Third Ward (Atlanta), a historic ward of Atlanta, Georgia
- Third Ward, Charlotte, a ward of Charlotte, North Carolina
- Third Ward, Houston, a neighborhood of Houston, Texas
- Ward 3 of the District of Columbia, a ward of Washington, D.C.
- Ward 3, St. Louis City, an aldermanic ward of St. Louis, Missouri
- 3rd ward, Chicago, an aldermanic ward of Chicago
- Third Ward Historic District, a historic district located at Rochester in Monroe County, New York

Zimbabwe

- Ward 3, the name of several wards of Zimbabwe

== Other uses ==
- 3rd Ward Brooklyn, a defunct art company in Brooklyn, New York, U.S.
- The Church of Jesus Christ of Latter-day Saints and the Kingdom of God, a Mormon fundamentalist sect in Utah, U.S.
- Ward 3 (film), a 2012 film featuring James Phelps
