= Crown Books =

Former bookseller based in Maryland, U.S.

- Type: Public
- Industry: Retail (Specialty)
- Founded: 1977
- Defunct: 2001
- Fate: Liquidation
- Headquarters: Prince George's County, Maryland, United States
- Number of locations: 18 (CA); 11 (IL); 10 (VA); 6 (MD); 1 (DC) in 2001
- Key people: Robert Haft
- Products: Books, Maps, CDs, DVDs, Calendars, Gift Packs, Magazines, Board games, Encyclopedias
- Parent: Dart Group (1977–1994)
- Website: Archived official website at the Wayback Machine (archived March 2, 2001)

Crown Books was a bookseller headquartered in Prince George's County, Maryland, with a Largo post office address. It was founded in the Washington, D.C., metro area by Robert Haft in 1977. Crown Books (retail) is of no relation to Crown Books (publisher), although the former carried inventory from the latter.

== Founding and growth ==
Crown Books was founded in the Washington, D.C., metro area in 1977 by Robert Haft with money borrowed from his father, D.C. businessman Herbert Haft. The chain was organized under the umbrella of the Dart Group (not related to the current UK-based Dart Group), which also included Trak Auto, Shoppers Food Warehouse, Total Beverage, Dart Drug, and Combined Properties. Known for low prices, the chain gained fame in the 1980s and early 1990s for its clever advertising campaigns (such as Robert Haft sitting on large stacks of books with the caption "Books Cost Too Much, That's Why I Opened Crown Books. Now You'll Never Pay Full Price Again!") At the beginning, Crown Books day-to-day operations were managed by Jose Gonzales (Vice President of Operations) and Jeanne Herrick (Vice President of Merchandising). Once the decision was made to expand into other areas the dynamic of Mr. Gonzales & Ms. Herrick was replicated into the California market with the addition of Steve Young & Miriam Bass. Later Crown made the decision to enter the Chicago market and that entry was managed by Richard Lowe & Rhonda Branch.

Crown Books grew rapidly, from its single store in 1977 to a regional chain of 196 stores at its height in 1993, close on the heels of Borders and poised to become the nation's second-largest book chain. While Classic Crown Books stores, which afforded customers between 2,000 and 3,000 square feet (280 m^{2}) of book selection, had been the backbone of the company since its founding in 1977, they were gradually phased out in favor of the larger, more competitive, superstore format adopted by the company in 1990. Stocking up to 80,000 titles—10 times the number carried in Classic Crown stores—Super Crown Books locations supplemented the Classic Crown holdings with a large line of greeting cards, games, computer software, and an assortment of gift items. Each superstore provided between 12,000 and 35,000 square feet (3,300 m^{2}) of retail space. Robert Haft showed great foresight in planning Crown Software in 1986, but his side projects made him late to the superstore scene which competitors Barnes & Noble and Borders had begun.

In 1993, the company was the third largest book chain in the United States, after Barnes & Noble and Borders, and had stores in Washington, D.C., Baltimore, Chicago, Philadelphia, Houston, Los Angeles, San Francisco, Sacramento, Seattle and Portland. With the advent of its Super Crown Books locations, as well as the boom in sales volume of competitors like Borders, Barnes & Noble, and Books-a-Million, the company reevaluated its Classic Crown locations and determined that several of the smaller stores would become increasingly unprofitable as the trend toward larger bookstores continued. In 1993, under the guidance of Glenn E. Hemmerle, president and CEO of the company from October 1992 through June 1994, Crown prepared the financial groundwork for closing several of its smaller stores.

== Haft family feud ==
A bitter divorce between Herbert Haft and his wife tore the family apart, and pitted Crown Books founder Robert Haft against his father. When Herbert tried to replace Robert as the head of Crown Books, the situation exploded and their back-and-forth exploits regularly made the front page of The Washington Post over the months between the fall of 1993 and the summer of 1994, becoming a regional media sensation. After Robert's firing, upper management positions were abandoned and refilled with some regularity, draining the company of both management skills and cash.

The family feud playing out among Haft family members appeared close to resolution by May 1994. However, four months later a jury awarded Robert M. Haft $34.1 million in compensation for a breach of contract by Dart Group and Crown Books. Several lawsuits and countersuits were filed by other members of the Haft family as each jockeyed for a controlling interest in family-controlled companies. By 1996 Crown found itself listed as co-plaintiff in a lawsuit brought against Herbert H. Haft by the Dart Group charging fraud and breach of fiduciary duty with regard to business transactions made during the course of Haft's divorce and resulting power struggle. Crown had been named as a co-defendant in similar lawsuits filed by shareholder groups as early as 1993.

A standstill rider was entered in Delaware court in 1995, restricting certain relevant actions of the Dart Corporation until such time as all legal matters were resolved; by mid-1997 a conditional settlement had been reached with Herbert H. Haft whereby Haft would relinquish his position and voting rights in the Dart Group in exchange for approximately $41 million.

== Bankruptcy ==
With the dissolution of the Dart Group, Crown was unable to find a buyer and was forced into bankruptcy. After being hired to replace Jeanne Herrick as Vice President of Merchandising, Steve Stevens (Circuit City) replaced Glenn E. Hemmerle in the CEO seat. Over the next few years, the chain began to close over half of its 196 stores and pulled out of Houston, Philadelphia, Baltimore, Portland, and Sacramento markets. The chain reorganized with help from Ingram Content Group, which provided jobbing services to the crippled giant.

Crown emerged briefly from bankruptcy in 1997 only to fall back into it in 1998 under leadership of CEO Anna Currence, strangled by lack of financing and stores too small to compete with the superstores of the competition (of the 56 remaining Crown Books stores after the first bankruptcy, only one had a drink bar, an ominous sign of Crown's out-of-touch management in the retail book marketplace). Crown emerged briefly from their second bankruptcy in the spring of 2000 with former Waldenbooks CEO Charlie Cumello in the CEO seat, financed by private funding. In the fall of 2000, the company's debt was purchased by Wells Fargo, which hounded the reemerging brand with collection fees until it eventually broke. In February 2001, Crown Books filed for liquidation, and in April 2001, ten of the D.C.-area stores and eight Chicago stores were purchased by Books-A-Million for pennies on the dollar. The liquidation of the remaining Crown Books stores was completed by July 2001, when a former Palo Alto, California, flagship store was shuttered.

== The aftermath ==
After Crown Books' bankruptcy in 2001, Andy Weiss, owner of a private bookseller called A&S Booksellers, bought the Crown Books name and trademark and applied the name to most of his stores. In 2007, Ward Albright purchased the right to share the name with Weiss and opened more bookstores under the Crown Books name. The present Crown Books chain buys remaindered books and overstock in bulk from publishers at large discounts and passes the discounts to customers.

Books-A-Million closed one of the DC-area former Crown stores shortly after purchase, but remodeled the remaining 17 stores in 2001 and 2002, and hired on many of the former Crown Books staff. After Crown Books, Anna Currence became an executive recruiter with Sarasota, Florida-based Brooke Chase Associates Inc. Crown CIO Susan Harwood stayed with Books-A-Million until 2007, when she joined Borders Books and Music as CIO. Crown Books area manager Rich Ball briefly assisted the Books-A-Million changeover, then founded book wholesaler The Page's Edge in Springfield, Virginia.

== Corporate affairs ==
The headquarters had a Largo, Maryland post office address. Its area was physically defined as being in the Mitchellville, Maryland census-designated place by the U.S. Census Bureau in the 1990 U.S. census. As of the 2000 U.S. census, the Census Bureau redefined the area as being in the Lake Arbor census-designated place. (Note: In the 1990s the U.S. Census Bureau defined the area now delineated as Lake Arbor CDP as being in Mitchellville CDP. The Lake Arbor CDP was delineated as of the 2000 U.S. census.)

== Sources ==
- McDowell, Edwin (June 25, 1990). "Aggressive Discounting Pays Off for Crown Books". The New York Times.
- "Winner of the Week", Entertainment Weekly, October 14, 1994
- Crown Books Corporation, Funding Universe. Accessed November 7, 2007
- "Dart Group sues chairman, CEO for $43 million-plus", Washington Business Journal, December 17, 1996
- "The Top 100 Public Companies — No 48: Crown Books, The Washington Post, April 28, 1997
- "Crown Books in deep trouble; stock dives 39%", Washington Times, May 6, 1998
- Crown Books Corp., The Motley Fool, December 8, 1997
- "Crown Says Bankruptcy Is Possible; Book Chain Comments After Nasdaq Stops Trading in Stock", Washington Times, July 9, 1998
- "Crown Books Corporation History", International Directory of Company Histories Volume 21, St. James Press, 1998
- "Crown Books may face uncertain future". Discount Store News. 37 (14). July 27, 1998. Archived from the original on February 27, 2007 – via FindArticles.
- "Crown Books to Close 79 Stores and Lay Off 1,250". The New York Times. August 4, 1998.
- "14 Crown Bookstores Shut Doors; Bankruptcy Court Approves Plan", The Washington Post, August 21, 1998
- Crown Books - Employment Agreement Re: Anna L. Currence, January 12, 1998
- "Crown Books Files Consensual Plan of Reorganization", Crown Books Press Release, July 1, 1999
- Crown Books Plan of Reorganization is Confirmed, Crown Books Press Release, October 7, 1999
- Crown Books Hires Charlie Cumelo as President and CEO", PRNewswire, November 19, 1999
- "Crown recruits ex-CEO of rival", The Washington Post, November 30, 1999
- "Crown Books Files for Bankruptcy Again", Publishers Weekly, February 19, 2001
- "Borders Group Appoints Susan Harwood Chief Information Officer", Borders Press Release, August 20, 2001
- Letter to holders of Crown Books gift certificates, A&S Booksellers. Accessed November 7, 2007.
- "Discount bookseller takes on Crown name", North (San Diego) County Times, June 9, 2005
- "A bookstore does grow in Cupertino", Cupertino Courier, November 7, 2007
