= Dart Drug =

Defunct drug store chain

- Company type: Subsidiary
- Industry: Retail Pharmacy
- Founded: 1954
- Founder: Herbert Haft, Gloria Haft
- Fate: Bankruptcy and liquidation
- Area served: Washington, D.C., Virginia, and Maryland
- Parent: Dart Group

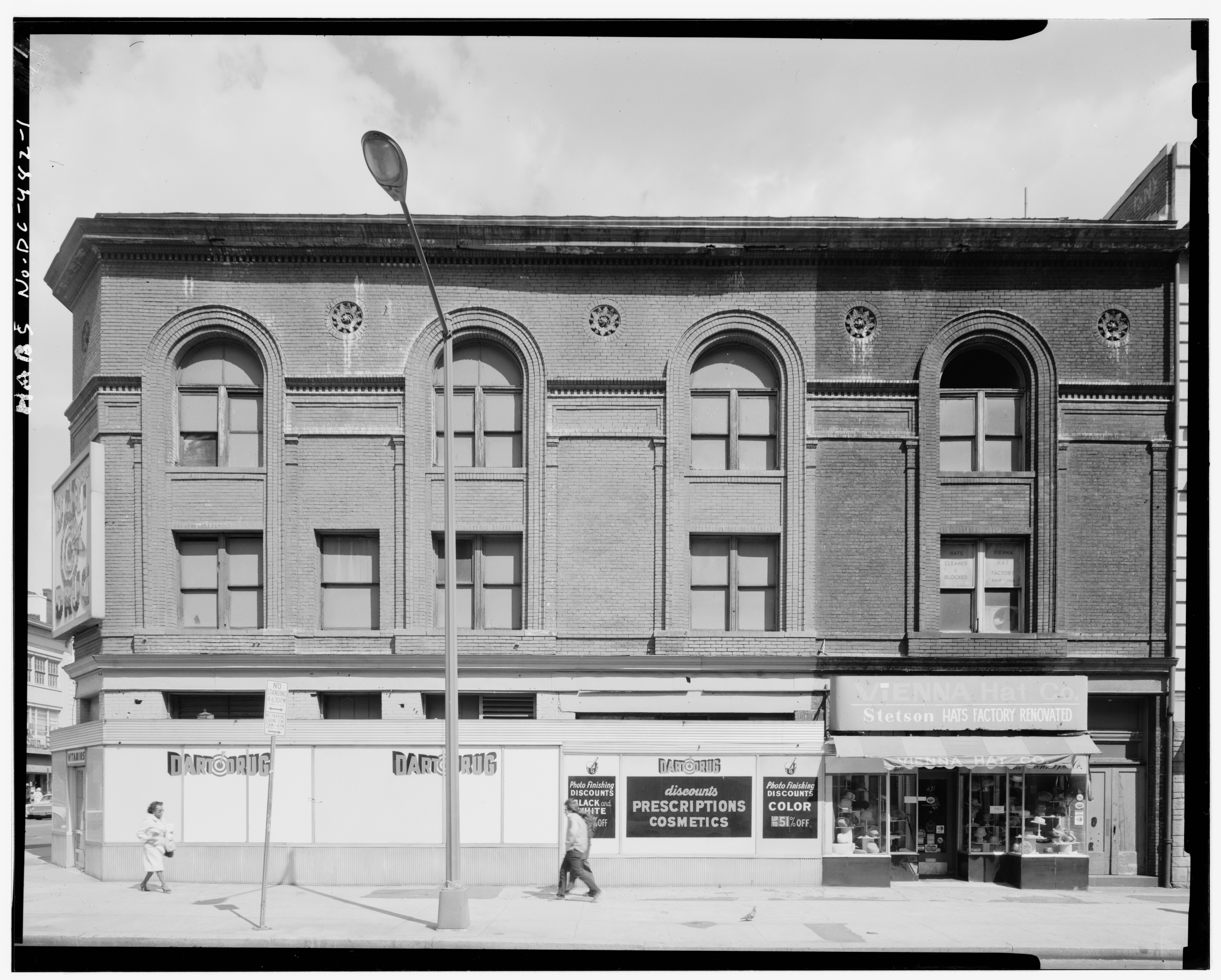
A Dart Drug store on Eleventh Street in Washington D.C.

Dart Drug was a chain of discount drug stores in the metropolitan Washington, DC region. It expanded to over 70 stores, and became a vehicle (as Dart Group) by which Herbert Haft engaged in greenmail activities against other public companies.

It spun off Trak Auto and Crown Books. Dart Drug was sold to a management group in 1984, bought by Bud Fantle in 1987 and renamed Fantle's. The chain entered bankruptcy in 1989, and was eventually dissolved in 1990. The leases for Fantle's stores were acquired by competitors.

The store's logo depicted a multicolored bullseye design with a triangular "dart" overlaid. The company altered the logo in 1980 to remove the dart, prompting Dayton Hudson to sue due to its similarity to Target's logo.

== History ==
Dart Drug was founded in 1954, by Herbert Haft and his wife Gloria in Adams Morgan. To pay for the original store, the couple borrowed money from Gloria's parents and liquidated their children's bonds. Haft found success offering most of his inventory below the manufacturer's suggested retail price, which was illegal for items covered by fair trade laws at the time. Despite the popularity of Dart Drug with customers, Haft faced hundreds of lawsuits from pharmaceutical and supply companies, including Parke-Davis, Squibb, Max Factor, and Revlon. By 1960, the United States Supreme Court ruled against fixing wholesale pricing, paving the way for growth in the discounting business. Dart Drug, with 10 stores at the time, incorporated and went public that year. By the end of the decade, Haft began running his company more like a private business than a publicly traded company. In the years that followed, his propensity for secrecy brought both increased attention and ire.

By the 1970s, the company's "Super Dart" format was as big as 60,000 square feet, and they carried apparel, sporting goods, watches, appliances, photographic equipment, automobile accessories, garden supplies, and outdoor furniture, alongside more traditional health and beauty products, as well as drugs. Starting in 1973, Dart also experimented with home improvement stores under the Dart Home name, but they were phased out in 1978. In 1977, Haft's son, Robert Haft, joined the company and started Crown Books, a discount bookseller. The Hafts also started Trak Auto, an auto parts discounter, in 1979.

In 1982, Robert was named president and chief operating officer of Dart Group at the age of 29. Herbert was named chairman and remained chief executive. It sold 50% interest of Crown Books to Thrifty Corporation in 1982 and a minority interest in Trak Auto in 1983. By 1984, the Hafts sold its 73-store Dart Drug chain for $160 million to a management group headed by president Alvin Towle and senior vice president Stephen J. Hansborough. Between bonuses and stock options, the sale made Herbert and Robert the fifth- and seventh-highest paid executives in the country that year.

Towle resigned in January 1986 and Dart nearly fell into bankruptcy by the following year. In July 1987, Sheldon Fantle, former owner of Lane Drug and Peoples Drug, took control of the company after making a major financial investment. Hansborough then resigned. However, Dart maintained a heavy debt load, requiring the company to downsize its drugstore format. The US Department of Labor also filed charges against the company, Towle, and Hansborough for illegally using its pension fund as collateral in the 1984 sale. In April 1989, the chain's 69 drugstores in Washington, D.C., Maryland, and Virginia were renamed to Fantle's Drugstore. Fantle also introduced a free prescription delivery service. However, the company filed for bankruptcy that August and announced a liquidation a year later.

== Dart Group ==
Using the funds from the sale of Dart Drug and junk bonds, the Hafts began mounting takeover bids for May Department Stores, Eckerd, Beatrice Companies, Federated Department Stores, Stop & Shop, Safeway, Supermarkets General, and the Dayton Hudson Corporation throughout the 1980s. After acquiring stakes in these companies, Dart Group would then sell its shares back to them at a premium. By 1987, both Trak Auto and Crown Books had over 200 locations. The Hafts acquired 50% equity in Shoppers Food Warehouse in 1988. In October 1992, Dart Group started Total Beverage, a beer-and-wine discount retailer.

However, by the early 1990s, Herbert Haft's tactics and increased competition were believed to be dragging down the company's value. Dart Drug settled an investigation by the SEC into whether the company was operating more like an investment firm than a corporation. At this time, Robert Haft asked his father to give him control of the company. In response, he fired his son, wife, daughter, and the board of directors. His son Ronald took Robert's place in the company. After a high-profile divorce and numerous legal battles, Dart Group's finances plummeted and Ronald accused his father of using the company's resources to pay for the wrongful termination settlements.

In 1994, an executive committee made up of outside directors was established and given full control of the company during the course of the Haft family litigations. By 1996, the company operated 276 Trak Auto stores, 172 Crown Books locations, and four Total Beverage superstores. In February 1997, the company gained full control the 34-store Shoppers Food Warehouse grocery chain. Dart bought out the Haft family later that year.

In April 1998, Dart was bought by Richfood, a grocery wholesaler, for $207 million. All of Dart's assets were put up for sale, except for Shoppers. Total Beverage was sold in 1998, becoming Total Wine & More. Trak Auto was sold in 1999. Crown Books was forced into bankruptcy in 1998 and 2001 before liquidating.
