= Fractured Atlas =

American nonprofit technology company

- Company type: Non-profit
- Industry: Technology
- Founded: 1998
- Founder: Adam Huttler
- Headquarters: United States

Fractured Atlas is a non-profit technology company that provides business tools for artists.

== History ==
Fractured Atlas was founded in 1998 by Executive Director Adam Huttler as a theater production company. Between 1998 and 2001, the company produced or presented numerous theatre, dance, and performance art shows in New York City. Fractured Atlas's final major production, Post-Traumatic Slave Syndrome, opened on September 7, 2001 at a theatre in lower Manhattan. Following the financial fallout of the September 11 terrorist attacks, Fractured Atlas began a shift from a production company to a service organization. The organization re-opened as a membership-based support organization for other artists in 2002. In 2007, it established the Open Arts Network, which closed in 2017.

In its early years as a service organization, Fractured Atlas was known for its programs providing health and other insurance, fiscal sponsorship, professional development, and other technical assistance. While these programs were all web-based, the organization did not begin seriously to position itself as a "technology company" until late 2009, when it announced the launch of ATHENA (later renamed Artful.ly). In August 2013, Fractured Atlas acquired Gemini SBS, which was previously an affiliated for-profit company that developed web applications for non-profit and arts industry clients. In 2014, Fractured Atlas launched the Arts Entrepreneurship Awards and a software development fellowship program for artists.

== Programs ==
The organization's primary services include fiscal sponsorship and insurance, along with the software products Artful.ly and Spaces. Other significant activity includes the Arts Entrepreneurship Awards and a software development fellowship for artists.

=== Fiscal Sponsorship ===
Fractured Atlas's fiscal sponsorship programs allows non-commercial art-related projects to be supported through grants and tax-deductible donations without the project having to maintain independent 501(c)(3) status. As of May 2014, the organization reported to be sponsoring nearly 3,500 artists and organizations through this program, and to have raised over $62 million in support of their work.

=== Arts Entrepreneurship Awards ===
The Arts Entrepreneurship Awards seek to honor innovators and entrepreneurs in the business aspects of arts and culture.

==== 2014 Winners ====
- Rubber Repertory (Austin, Tex.)
- Creative Partners (Chicago, Ill.)
- ArtHome (New York, N.Y.)
- Of a Kind (New York, N.Y.)
- Todd Scalise (Erie, Pa.)

== Awards and recognition ==
Fractured Atlas has received a 4-star rating (the highest possible) on Charity Navigator in each of the past three years.

Fractured Atlas earned a 4.5 star aggregate rating on Great Nonprofits.
