= Cullen Gilchrist =

American restaurateur, economist and entrepreneur

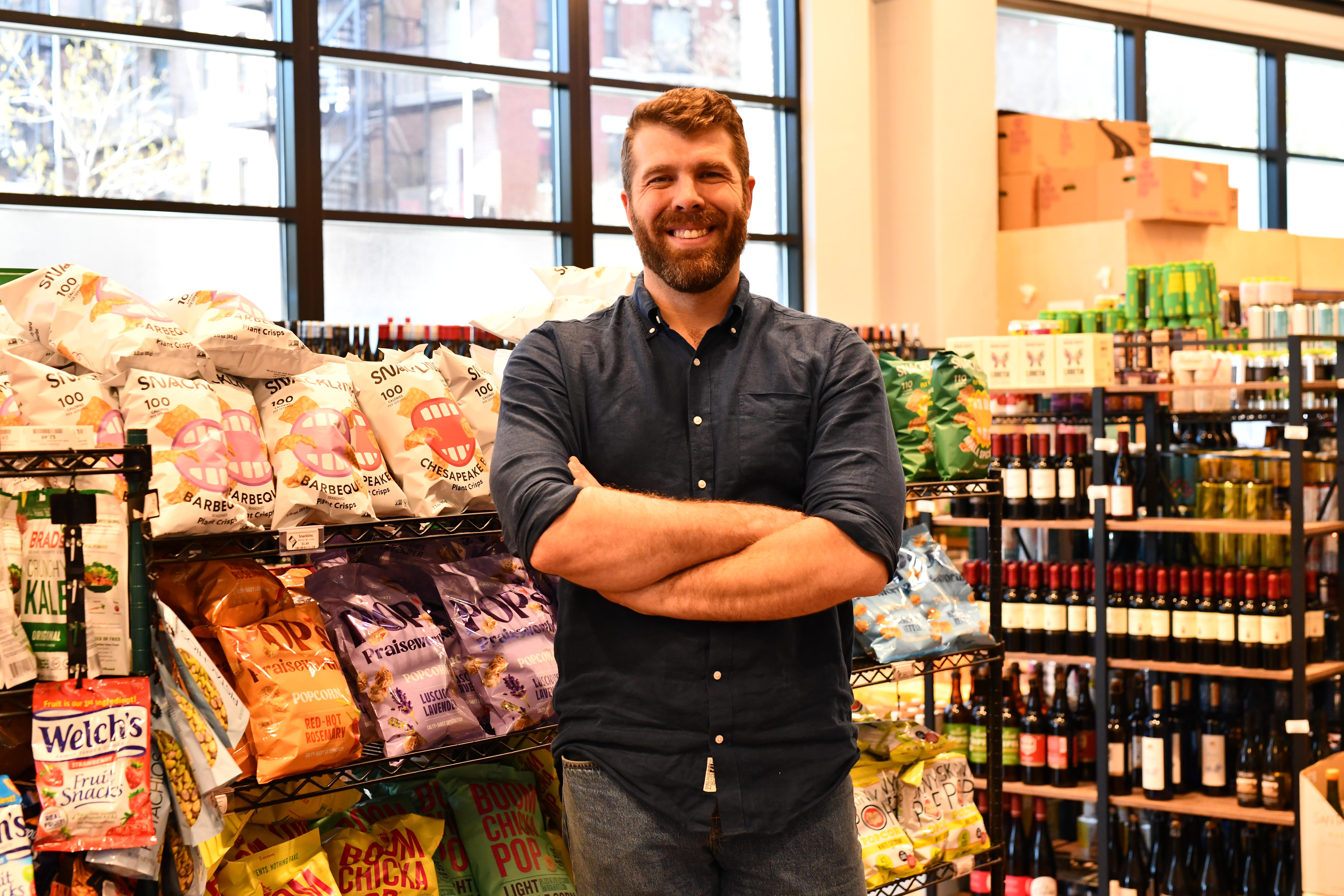
- Citizenship: American
- Education: Dartmouth College
- Years active: 2012–present
- Known for: chief executive officer and founder of Union Kitchen

Cullen Gilchrist is an American restaurateur, economist and entrepreneur. He is the chief executive officer and co-founder of Union Kitchen, an accelerator of food businesses.

== Education and career ==
Cullen obtained his high school diploma from Dartmouth High School in 2003. He attended Dartmouth College and earned a degree in Economics and Sociology in 2007. After graduating, he began his career as an intern in finance before switching to food business.

Cullen worked as a general manager and Area Food Safety Manager at Sodexo in Boston. In 2010, he relocated to Washington D.C. and worked at Think Food Group as a manager. In 2012, Cullen and Jonas Singer co-founded a pop up coffee shop called Blind Dog Cafe on Florida Avenue. In 2023, he was a speaker at the Good Business Summit and was part of Entrepreneurs in Residence 2023 held by Pillsbury Institute for Hospitality Entrepreneurship.

== Union Kitchen ==
In 2012, Cullen co-founded Union Kitchen to partner with food businesses and link the founders of the businesses with resources, capital, and networks needed to grow their businesses. The company started in a 7,300-square-foot space shared commercial cooking space in a Northeast Washington warehouse. The company introduced a food business acceleration process. The accelerator is built out into four phases; Launch, Product Market Fit, Growth, and Scale. In 2022, Cullen established the Union Kitchen Fund 1, a $20M Series A investment fund.
