= Trak Auto =

American retail automotive parts chain

Trak Auto Corporation
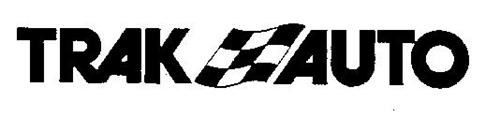
- Company type: Private
- Industry: Specialty retail
- Founded: 1979; 47 years ago
- Founders: Robert Haft, Herbert Haft
- Defunct: 2001; 25 years ago
- Fate: Liquidation
- Successor: Advance Auto Parts
- Headquarters: Landover, Md., USA
- Number of locations: 333 (1993)
- Area served: Washington, D.C. metro area; Richmond, Virginia metro area; Chicago metro area; Los Angeles metro area; San Diego metro area, south central and Western PA
- Products: Replacement automotive parts & accessories
- Parent: Dart Group (1979–1997), Restoration Auto Parts (1997–2001)
- Website: Archived official website at the Wayback Machine (archived 2001-12-11)

Trak Auto Corporation was an American retail chain specializing in automotive parts and accessories based in Landover, Maryland. Founded by Robert Haft in 1979, at its peak in 1993 it operated 333 stores around the United States under the Trak Auto, Super Trak, and Super Trak Warehouse concepts. A declining market, stiff competition, and management problems led to a steep decline and bankruptcy, with its remaining stores acquired by and converted to Advance Auto Parts in 2002.

== History ==
Trak Auto formed part of the stable of discount operations owned by the Dart Group, the family holding company of Herbert Haft, and grew indirectly out of Dart Drug. Part of Dart Drug's strategy was to offer additional merchandise beyond the usual prescription drugs, health and beauty aids, and other merchandise that is typically found in a neighborhood drug store during the early 1970s. Robert Haft noticed that they were selling large volumes of auto supplies in his drug stores. His research discovered that 80 percent of aftermarket auto supplies were sold by independent, mom-and-pop operations, leaving room for a national discount retailer. After studying competitors like Sears and the Pep Boys, Trak Auto was launched in 1979.

Trak Auto expanded rapidly, following the same aggressive strategy as its recently formed sister company, Crown Books: heavy discounts on high-volume products from mostly suburban standalone locations. In 1982, it partnered with Los Angeles-based Thrifty Corp, owners of the Thrifty Drug Stores chain, to open Trak Auto stores in Southern California. The venture lost heavily, which Haft blamed on insufficient volume— "We needed 50 stores in Chicago and 100 in Los Angeles to break even" he would tell Fortune magazine in a 1987 interview. After Thrifty agreed to be acquired by Pacific Lighting in 1986, it sold its stake in the West Coast Trak Auto and Crown Books operations back to Dart, paying $11.7 million to be relieved of $40 million in loan guarantees. In an attempt to increase revenue, they advertised as having stores that stayed open later than most auto parts stores, with a few stores open 24 hours.

In 1993, at its peak, Trak Auto operated 333 stores in the Washington, D.C., Richmond, Chicago, and Los Angeles metro areas, but shifted strategy around this time to closing unprofitable stores and replacing them with large-format Super Trak and warehouse store Super Trak Warehouse locations; the first Super Trak opened in 1992. In 1995, it acquired National Auto Stores, which operated stores in the Pittsburgh area, with plans to convert them to its superstore formats. But the early 1990s saw the company roiled by management struggles at the Dart Group, amidst disagreements between Herbert and Robert Haft, and Herbert's divorce with his wife Gloria. The acrimonious family split led Businessweek to speculate that the elder Haft was deliberately using accounting measures to undermine the companies, to weaken Gloria and Robert: Trak Auto reported 1994 income had declined by 98% over the year before.

The Haft dispute was settled by the courts in 1995, and Richard Stone brought in to serve as the Dart Group's new CEO in 1997. But while the management situation had stabilized, the company was in a weak position. Sales across the category were flat, as fewer people were interested in do-it-yourself car repairs and improvements, and a strong economy allowed more people to pay for service. In October 1997, Trak Auto withdrew from the Southern California market, selling its 80 stores to CSK Auto, which were rebranded as Kragen Auto Parts. The following year, the Dart Group itself was acquired by supermarket operator Richfood, which was interested only in the Shoppers Food & Pharmacy operations. Trak Auto was quickly sold off in 1999 to HalArt LLC, which sought to operate it alongside Cleveland-based Forest City Auto Parts and other automotive chains.

This venture failed, however, and HalArt, which did business as Restoration Auto Parts, and Trak Auto filed for Chapter 11 bankruptcy in July 2001. By that time, Forest City had already gone bankrupt and been liquidated. The bankruptcy court ultimately ordered the company liquidated. The Midwestern locations were closed, and the leases for 55 stores in Northern Virginia, Washington D.C. and eastern Maryland were assumed by Advance Auto Parts in 2002, which subsequently converted them to its brand.
