= Herbert Haft =

American businessman (1920-2004)

- Born: August 24, 1920; Baltimore, Maryland, U.S.
- Died: September 1, 2004 (aged 84); Washington, D.C., U.S.
- Occupation: Businessman
- Spouse(s): Gloria Haft (divorced); Myrna C. Ruben
- Children: 3, including Robert

Herbert H. Haft (August 24, 1920 – September 1, 2004) was an American businessman who was famous first for the development of discount stores in the drug store, bookstore, and auto part businesses in Washington, D.C., and later as a corporate raider.

== Early life and education ==
Haft was born to a Jewish family in Baltimore, Maryland, the son of an immigrant pharmacist from Russia. His family moved to Washington D.C. where he graduated from Central High School. He earned a B.S. in pharmacy from George Washington University.

== Career ==
After school, Haft worked as a pharmacist at a local drug store. In 1955, he and his wife, cosmetician Gloria Haft, opened the first drug discount store, Dart Drug in the Adams Morgan neighborhood of Washington, D.C. He quickly ran into problems as consumer goods wholesalers and pharmaceutical distributors refused to sell to him because his prices were lower than their other customers. Haft unsuccessfully sued until Parke-Davis - at the time one of the largest pharmaceutical companies in the U.S. - was charged by the Justice Department with price-fixing. Haft was a lead witness in the case which was eventually won by the government. The drug distributors - fearful of government action - returned to selling to Dart Drug and the business boomed.

In the late 1970s, Haft's son Robert, a graduate of Harvard Business School, joined the firm. Applying the same principle of mass retailing, the father and son team launched Crown Books. In 1984, he sold Dart Drug - then with 75 stores - for $160 million but retained control of the holding company, Dart Group. He also founded (with family members) Trak Auto, Combined Properties, and acquired part of Total Beverage and Shoppers Food Warehouse.

Haft's Dart Group earned $250 million through greenmail and stock sales during unsuccessful takeover attempts of retailers Safeway and Stop & Shop. In the 1990s, he was involved in widely publicized conflict with his sons Ronald and Robert Haft, and wife Gloria Haft over control of the Dart Group, a family business.

In a 1986 speech to a group of George Washington University alumni, Haft said that the secret of his success, was to borrow big: "If you owe someone several thousand dollars, you can't always sleep at night. If you owe someone several million dollars, the banker or supplier can't sleep. It's no use both of you worrying."

In 1998, Total Beverage was sold to Total Wine & More and the remainder of Dart Group, except Crown Books, was purchased by Richfood, a grocery distributor for $200 million. Richfood quickly sold Trak Auto to a Tennessee investment group. Crown Books filed for bankruptcy, and limped along on private investment until its closure in 2001.

In 1999, Herbert Haft launched HealthQuick, an online pharmacy, while his son Robert launched Vitamins.com. HealthQuick failed by 2001.

== Personal life ==
He was married to Gloria Haft for 45 years before divorcing; they had three children: Robert Haft, Ronald Haft, and Linda Haft. Haft was a member of Washington Hebrew Congregation. He and his family were engaged in a long-standing and bitter feud that culminated in his deathbed marriage to Myrna C. Ruben and the exclusion of his children from his will.

Herbert Haft died from heart disease on September 1, 2004, at a Washington D.C. hospital.
