= Shoppers Food & Pharmacy =

American supermarket chain located in Baltimore and Washington, DC

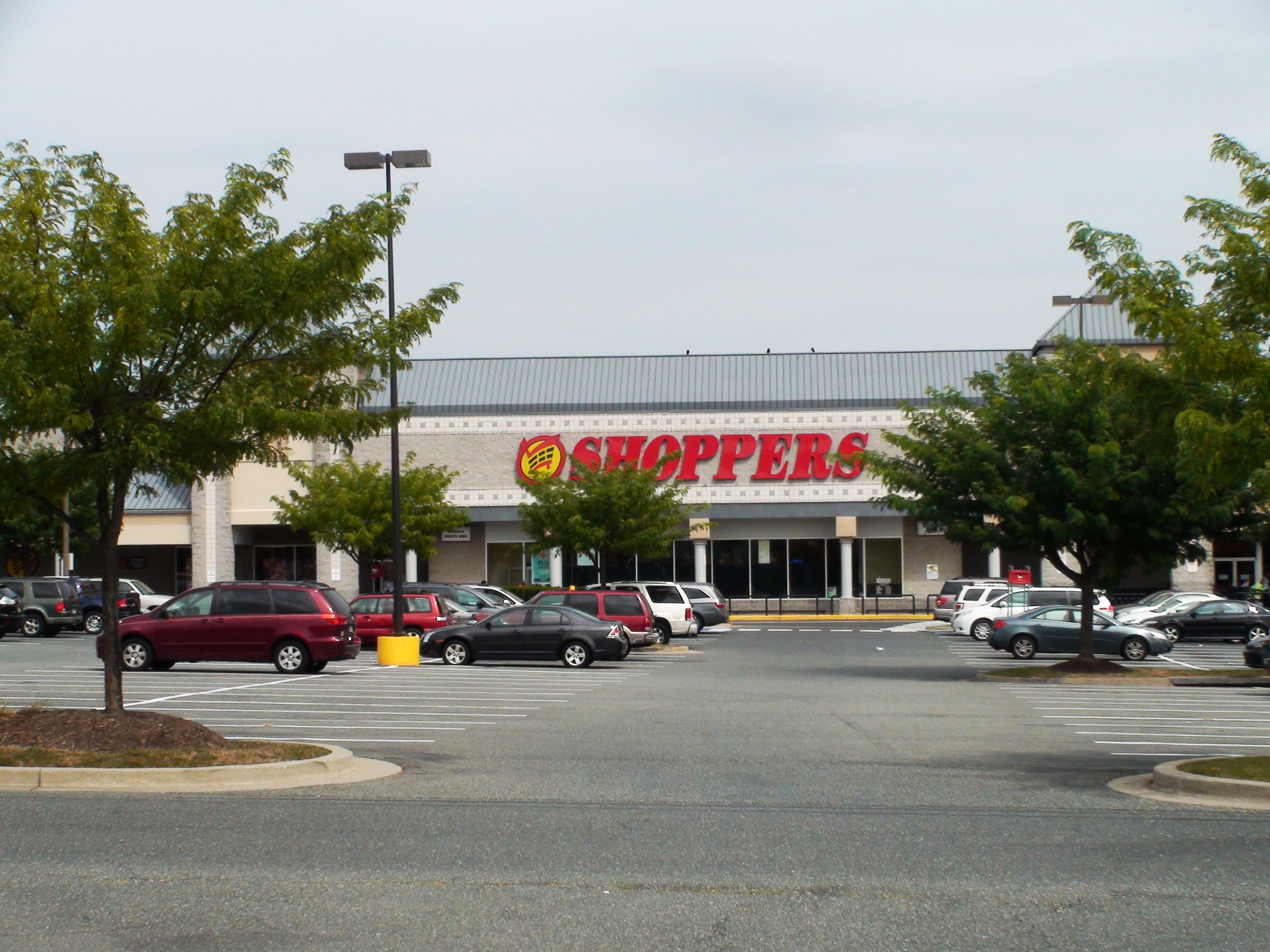
- A Shoppers Food & Pharmacy location in Germantown, Maryland (Now Closed)
- Type: Subsidiary
- Industry: Retail / grocery
- Founded: 1949 (77 years ago) in Washington, D.C., U.S.
- Founder: Irving Herman; Kenneth Herman
- Headquarters: Bowie, Maryland, U.S.
- Number of locations: 25
- Area served: Maryland; Virginia; Washington, D.C.
- Key people: Andre Persaud (CEO)
- Products: Bakery, dairy, deli, frozen foods, grocery, meat, produce, seafood, snacks and liquor
- Services: Supermarket
- Revenue: ▲US$5.8 million (2021)
- Total assets: ▲US$1.001 million (2021)
- Owner: United Natural Foods (2018–present)
- Number of employees: 300 (2021)
- Parent: Independent (1949–1996); Dart Group (1996–1998); Richfood (1998–1999); SuperValu (1999–2018); UNFI (2018–present)
- Website: shoppersfood.com

Shoppers Food & Pharmacy, also known as Shoppers Food Warehouse, is a chain of 22 American supermarkets located in the Baltimore and Washington, D.C., metropolitan areas. Shoppers provides produce, meats such as beef, pork, and chicken, Dietz & Watson delis, seafood, as well as hot food bars.

Shoppers is thought to have innovated several now-common supermarket features, such as warehouse shelving (no longer utilized in its stores), open-bin bulk foods (also no longer found in the chain), large salad bars with hot prepared foods and specialized fans to keep produce fresh, and "warehouse-sized" packaged products. Shoppers also was one of the first chains to sell all of its produce by the pound, rather than by the item, which is now common. This prevented the "picked-over" selection of produce commonly found in conventional supermarkets several days after a produce delivery.

== History ==
Shoppers Food & Pharmacy had its roots in a store opened in 1929 by founders Irving Herman and his younger brother, Kenneth Herman, at Vermont and V St., NW, Washington, D.C. The Herman brothers were joined by their brother-in-law, Sam Levin, in the late 1930s. Together the three brothers opened their first supermarket concept, River Terrace Supermarket, at 3439 Benning Rd., N.E., Washington, D.C. In 1952, the brothers rebranded the Benning Road store with a new concept, Jumbo Food Store. Shortly after they opened a second location in Seat Pleasant, Maryland at 401 Eastern Ave. They opened their third store in the Adelphi Shopping Center at 2400 University Blvd., E. Even after being gutted by a fire in 1994, the Adelphi store continued operations until 2011. By January 1960, with the addition of a store at 1551 Alabama Ave, S.E., there were a total of four Jumbo Food Store locations.

The brand was inspired by Kenneth's wife, Edyth, who had a deep love of elephants. Coincidentally, the logo, a smiling cartoon elephant, was different but quite similar to the elephants in the Walt Disney Animation Studios movie Dumbo, released around the same time as the launch of the chain. In the movie, Dumbo's mother was named Jumbo. Kenneth later explained that he purchased a license from a then much smaller Disney Company.

By March 1967, five additional locations were in operation: 1919 Michigan Ave, (at Eastern); 6016 Old Silver Hill Rd. at Marlboro Pike, District Heights, Maryland; 3041 Naylor Rd., S.E. near Sears and Suitland Pkwy.; 12145 Rockville Pike (Pike Shipping Center), Rockville, Maryland; and 6300 New Hampshire Ave., Takoma Park, Maryland. By 1969, the Alabama Ave store closed and eight stores remained. By 1978, the River Terrace, Michigan Ave., District Heights, and Naylor Rd., S.E., stores were closed.

On August 23, 1978, the last new Jumbo Food Store opened at Little River Turnpike and John Marr Drive (4223 John Marr Dr), Annandale, Virginia. In 1978, Jumbo also opened the first Shoppers Food Warehouse (SFW). The two remaining Herman brothers opened the first Shoppers Food Warehouse in 1978 as a foray into the warehouse supermarket business. Levin died before Shoppers was conceptualized. The original concept brought the Washington area its first non-membership chain in the area to offer an expanded selection of large-packaged (or "warehouse-sized") products at a lower, bulk price. Shoppers eliminated all but two to three sizes of each product to allow a greater selection of different brands on a typical shelf and to further lower prices. Using warehouse shelving and leaving packaged goods in their boxes on the shelves enabled a reduction of retail labor that also allowed a much lower price to be passed to the consumer. Since changing hands from the company founders, it has developed into a more conventional supermarket model with more conventional pricing.

The SFW at 3255 Little River Turnpike in the Brighton Mall, Alexandria, Virginia, opened in 1980. By 1983, there were three additional SFWs at 9195 Central Ave. (Hampton Mall), Capitol Heights, Maryland; Rt 108 & Georgia Ave (Village Mart Shopping Center), Olney, Maryland; and Little River Turnpike and Pickett Rd., Fairfax, Virginia. In 1985, when Jumbo / Shoppers became the third-largest chain in the DC area, eight SFWs and four Jumbos (Rockville, Takoma Park, Adelphi, Md., and Annandale, Va) were in operation. In 1986, there were 13 Jumbo or Shoppers locations with the Chantilly, Virginia, and Clinton, Maryland SFW locations opening that August. By 1989, when Herbert Haft acquired half interest in the Jumbo Food Stores chain, 18 Shoppers Food Warehouse locations were in operation and the Jumbo Food Store name was gone.

With the success of the Shoppers format, all Jumbo stores were eventually converted to Shoppers. In 1988, Irving and his son and vice president, Mike Herman, made the decision to retire, leaving Kenneth and his children in control of the corporation. In 1989, Irving sold 49 of his 50 percent of the company, leaving Kenneth with a majority 51 percent controlling stake in the company. Herbert Haft's Dart Group, whose holdings included Dart Drug, Crown Books, Trak Auto stores and Combined Properties Realty, purchased the minority share from Irving. Haft and the Herman brothers were long time acquaintances, having grown up and been schooled together in the same poor Jewish neighborhood of Washington, D.C. Kenneth remained at the company as president and CEO, his son Robert, then Executive Vice President, took over as Chief Operating Officer, son Mitchel retained his post as Senior Vice President for Corporate Affairs, and Kenneth's daughter and company spokesperson Sandra Perkins retained her position as Director of Marketing and Advertising. Another son, Laurence, did not work in the family business. Under the control of Robert, Shoppers grew to almost twice its size in the following ten years.

Dart acquired the remainder of the company in 1997 after exercising a complicated buy-sell agreement with the Herman family. Dart's intention was to force the Herman family into purchasing the shares of the company back after Dart experienced infighting amongst their board members and financial trouble with their retail chains. The final effect was the opposite; Dart was ultimately forced to purchase from the Hermans at an inflated price, starting a severe financial downward spiral and the ultimate sale and breakup of the Dart Corporation. The Herman siblings exited upon Dart's acquisition of the company, ending Shoppers' last connection to its founders. In April 1998, Richfood Holdings Inc., a regional wholesale distributor, purchased Dart Group in order to acquire Shoppers, later selling or spinning off Dart's other operations. SuperValu acquired Richfood Holdings in 1999, also large in part to acquire the Shoppers brand, which was by then the third largest supermarket chain in the Washington, D.C., region in sales and volume.

In 2018, United Natural Foods acquired SuperValu (including) Shoppers in order to obtain the wholesale operations of the company. They had little inclination to continue to operate the retail business and sold off many of the retail assets. All Shoppers pharmacies closed in 2019, although UNFI plans to indefinitely retain operations at remaining Shoppers locations.

From October 2022 to August 2023, Shoppers began quietly opening several new stores, mostly including former locations sold by UNFI.

== In the community ==
Through the Shoppers Foundation, Shoppers supports organizations like the Ed Block Courage Award Foundation and now the American Red Cross of the National Capital Area. Shoppers donates to over 2500 schools, churches and not-for-profit organizations throughout their trade area.

In 2000, the Shoppers Classic Charity Golf Tournament was established to raise funds along with its vendor partners for local causes, including the Maryland Food Bank and Capitol Area Food Bank, new community playgrounds, and the Ed Block Courage Award Foundation for underprivileged children.

== Controversy ==
On May 29, 2008, it was reported that the FBI had searched Maryland State Senator Ulysses Currie's District Heights home and taken documents related to his work as a consultant to Shoppers Food & Pharmacy. On September 1, 2010, federal grand jury indicted Currie and Shoppers Food Warehouse Corporation executives William J. White and R. Kevin Small in connection with a scheme from 2002 to 2008 in which the supermarket chain allegedly paid Senator Currie in exchange for using his official position and influence in matters benefiting White, Small, and the supermarket chain.

In 2025, a whistleblower report published by People for the Ethical Treatment of Animals (PETA) indicated unethical treatment of chickens by Farmers Focus, a supplier for Shoppers Food. In response to the allegations, Shoppers Food dropped Farmers Focus as a supplier.
