= Kitchen incubator =

Licensed commercial space that is certified for food production

A shared-use kitchen is a licensed commercial space that is certified for food production. Renters or members can use the kitchen by the hour or day to produce food while fulfilling regulatory compliance. Food entrepreneurs, ranging from chefs, caterers, food trucks proprietors, bakers, to value-added producers, can benefit from the shared kitchen instead of spending capital to build or lease their own facility. A commissary kitchen is an example of a shared-use kitchen that provides kitchen rentals. Kitchen incubators, also known as culinary incubators, also provide kitchen rental but can provide additional services like business development training, and access to services such as legal aid, packaging, label printing, and distribution.

== History ==
Investments and interest in the food sector have contributed to a growth in food entrepreneurship across the United States. In support of such innovation, the 2002 Farm Bill allocated $27.7 million in competitive grants to support the development of value-added food production and to create Agriculture Innovation Centers “to foster the ability of agricultural producers to reap the benefits of producing and marketing value-added products”. These early investments may have ignited a new sector of community-driven food businesses, with a supporting infrastructure of technical assistance partners. As a result, between August 2013 and March 2016 the number of kitchen incubators (providing technical assistance to food entrepreneurs) in America increased by more than 50% to over 200 facilities.

== Business model ==
By mitigating start-up costs and providing a nurturing environment, business incubators help firms grow and stay in their communities. Culinary incubators adapt the traditional business incubator model by replacing office space with fully equipped commercial kitchens.There are three kinds of business models practiced in a shared kitchen environment. Shared-use kitchens, incubator kitchens and food accelerators.

All three business models rely on the fact that FDA and state regulation prohibit the sale of food that is not produced in a licensed facility. Culinary start-ups are unlikely to receive venture capital or bank financing, as profit margins are too slim and volatile for such a highly competitive market. Food products must be tested and tweaked over time before they are economically viable. Even once proven viable, the entrepreneur must navigate a complex network of regulation, packaging and distribution before running a profitable enterprise. This entrepreneur often lacks a business background and an understanding of what is involved in the start-up process. Start-up costs in the food space are high and can range, as of 2013, from $15,000 to $100,000.

== Targeted markets ==
Kitchen incubators are likely to be used by the following end-users:

- Start-up food businesses in need of their first facility
- Home-based businesses that wish to legalize and grow their operation
- Established businesses relying on one-off or difficult situation kitchen rentals
- Established businesses looking to grow or reach a new market

These businesses include caterers, food trucks, prepared meal services, meal or box delivery, pet food makers, personal chefs, bakers, street vendors, cake decorators and producers of specialty food items such as condiments, beverages, and candies. Delivery only restaurants, also known as 'dark restaurants', 'ghost restaurants', or 'cloud restaurants' are increasing leveraging shared use kitchens to lower their overhead and launch pop-up dinner options.

Some incubator-style kitchen models have emerged in response to systemic barriers faced by specific populations, such as low-income and immigrant women. These models often provide not only licensed kitchen space and regulatory support, but also culturally relevant mentorship, child care accommodations, and community-oriented business training. In such cases, economic development is approached with attention to social factors including caregiving responsibilities, linguistic diversity, and informal financial practices. This form of support seeks to address structural challenges in areas like permitting, access to capital, and formalization of home-based food enterprises, especially for entrepreneurs navigating intersecting barriers related to race, gender, and immigration status. Rather than focusing solely on rapid scaling or formal incorporation, some incubator models prioritize stability, community participation, and sustainable self-employment. These approaches are sometimes referred to in academic literature as responses to "institutional voids," where public or private support systems do not adequately serve marginalized business owners.

== See also ==
- Business incubator
- Union Kitchen
