= The Leland C. and Mary M. Pillsbury Institute for Hospitality Entrepreneurship =

Cornell University School of Hotel Administration The Leland C. and Mary M. Pillsbury Institute for Hospitality Entrepreneurship
- Established: 2006
- Director: Pauline A. Milwood
- Location: Ithaca, New York, U.S. 42.4458011°N 76.48158639999997°W
- Website: business.cornell.edu/centers/pihe/

The Leland C. and Mary M. Pillsbury Institute for Hospitality Entrepreneurship is an institute at Cornell University located in Ithaca, New York within the School of Hotel Administration. Through the engagement of leading industry leaders and faculty, the institute educates and provides students with a wide realm of activities to expand their entrepreneurship knowledge. The most up-to-date information on the institute can be found on the press release page of the website.

== Goals ==
Focusing on advancing students’ entrepreneurship knowledge and mastery, the institutes holds a variety of entrepreneurship focused events including:

1. Entrepreneur in Residence Office Hours
2. Business Consultations
3. Hospitality Business Plan Competition
4. Meet and Repeat Speed Networking
5. Hospitality Hackathons
6. “Slice of Insight” Pizza Socials and Networking

With the goal to supporting students on their entrepreneurial journeys, the institute strives to connect the academic and the practical. Through the institute, several entrepreneurship courses have been created in support of the entrepreneurship concentration at the School of Hotel Administration.
