= Union Kitchen =

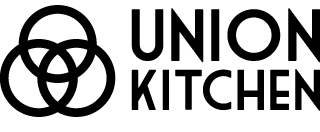
- Type: Private
- Industry: Business incubator
- Founded: 2012; 14 years ago in Washington, D.C.
- Founders: Jonas Singer; Cullen Gilchrist
- Headquarters: Washington, D.C., United States
- Key people: Cullen Gilchrist (CEO)
- Website: www.unionkitchen.com

Union Kitchen is an American business incubator based in Washington, D.C.

Union Kitchen merges the concepts of a shared kitchen and a business incubator, catering primarily to small food businesses.

== History ==
Union Kitchen was founded as Black Strap Bakery in 2012 by Jonas Singer and Cullen Gilchrist in Washington, D.C. It originated from Singer and Gilchrist's search for a kitchen space for their Blind Dog Cafe and Bakery. They repurposed a 7,300-square-foot vacant kitchen near the U.S. Capitol into Union Kitchen, starting with a few members. The first food incubator was opened by Union Kitchen in 2012 in NoMa.

In February 2013, Washington D.C.'s government established a partnership with Union Kitchen aimed at supporting district residents in initiating culinary careers. The initiative provided entrepreneurs at Union Kitchen's Northeast Washington facility a platform for starting their businesses with reduced costs and risks.

In May 2013, Union Kitchen acquired empty lots in NoMa, launching weekend open-air bazaars for food trucks and vendors to sell prepared foods. They also planned to host food events and acoustic music on Thursdays and Fridays, and to collaborate with Relay Foods for a weekly grocery pick-up spot.

In March 2014, Union Kitchen opened a market and cafe in Capitol Hill.

In November 2014, the National Museum of Women in the Arts formed a partnership with Union Kitchen to manage the museum's Mezzanine Cafe. This collaboration involved a rotation of pop-up cafes operated by Union Kitchen's members. In the same year, Union Kitchen was named as one of the finalists for USA Today's Entrepreneur of the Year award.

In 2015, Union Kitchen expanded its operations by opening a second location in Ivy City. It also invested $2 million in a 15,000-square-foot warehouse, increasing the capacity for new members.

In 2016, Jonas Singer stepped down as the chief executive officer (CEO) of Union Kitchen.

In January 2018, Union Kitchen opened a 2,500-square-foot grocery store in the One Franklin Square building in Washington, D.C., and another 3,000-square-foot store in the redeveloped Ballston Quarter mall in Ballston.

== Business model ==
Union Kitchen provides small food enterprises with six-month memberships to a regulated community kitchen at a reduced cost. Additionally, Union Kitchen provides services in branding and distribution, as well as catering and distribution for member products.

Union Kitchen also provides a distribution company managed by the incubator itself. The membership also includes a coworking space situated near one of the kitchens.

== See also ==
- Kitchen incubator
