= Anna Currence =

American businesswoman

Anna Currence was CEO of Kitchen Bazaar from 1993 to 1995, before she was recruited to the President and COO spot at ailing Crown Books in 1997. She assumed Crown's CEO position on January 12, 1998. She was instrumental in the bankruptcy-emergence of the book retailer, though she left Crown in October 1998, just 1 month before it emerged from Chapter 11. After Crown Books, Ms Currence became an executive recruiter with Chicago-based Brooke Chase Associates Inc.

Previous to her executive positions, Currence worked for Barnes & Noble from 1973 to 1990.
