= Robert Haft =

American entrepreneur

Robert M. Haft
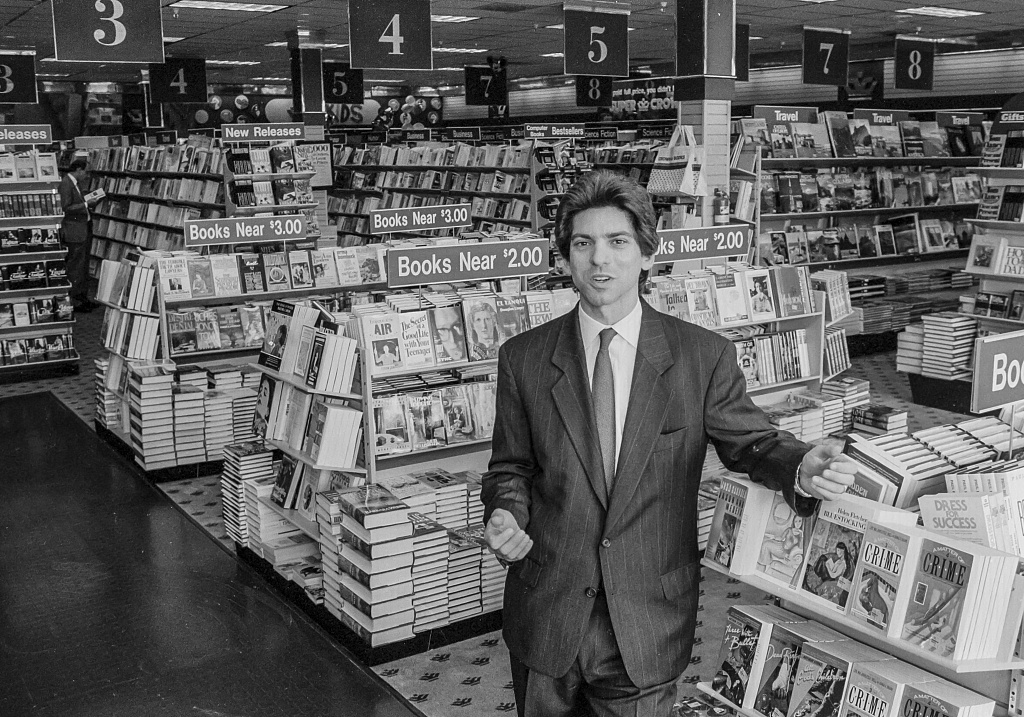
- Robert M. Haft inside of a Crown Bookstore
- Born: c. 1953; United States
- Education: Wharton; Harvard University
- Occupation: Entrepreneur
- Known for: Founder, Crown Books, Main Street Lender, Morgan Noble
- Spouse: Mary Haft
- Parent(s): Gloria Haft; Herbert Haft

Robert Michael Haft is an entrepreneur, primarily in health care, and became a household name in the Washington, D.C., Chicago, San Francisco, Houston, and Los Angeles markets for his Crown Books television commercial tagline, "Books cost too much, so I opened Crown Books. Now you'll never pay full price again."

== Education ==
Haft earned a B.S. in economics from the Wharton School of the University of Pennsylvania in 1974. He simultaneously earned an MBA from Harvard Business School as well as a master's degree from Harvard's School of Design.

== Dart Group ==
Based on a thesis he wrote in business school, Haft founded Crown Books, a discount book chain and a subsidiary of the Dart Group, in 1977 after traveling around the country for five months learning about the book business. His father, Herbert Haft, funded the initiative. In 1979, he and his father founded a discount automotive chain called Trak Auto, which sold auto parts and accessories such as mufflers, batteries, pressure gauges, and seat cushions for 35% to 51% below suggested retail price. They also founded Cabot Morgan real estate company, Dart Financial, and purchased an interest in Shoppers Food Warehouse.

In 1982, he was appointed president and chief operating officer of its parent company, Dart Group, which made him "one of the youngest executives to head a major national company" at 29 years old. Crown Books enjoyed booming success in the early 1980s and 1990s. Haft expanded the chain rapidly and envisioned expanding the name to other lines, including Crown Software and Crown Music, some of which never saw actualization.

== Other businesses ==
In the heat of a bitter divorce in 1993, Robert's father - then Chairman of the Dart Group, which owned a controlling share of Crown Books and Trak Auto - fired the board of directors of Dart Group, Crown Books, Trak Auto, and Robert Haft as the book chain and automotive chains president. This sparked a family feud that spawned suits and countersuits, with both sons Robert and Ronald Haft ultimately fighting for control of the family business. Robert countersued and won all claims, after which Dart Group and Crown Books were ordered to pay him about $34 million in compensation. After he left, both previously successful chains fell into Chapter 11 bankruptcy.

With a portion of the money from the sale of his interest in Dart Group, and proceeds from a 1994 wrongful-termination lawsuit, Haft purchased Phar-Mor discount drug chain in 1995, founded and grew Vitamins.com, which had internet, retail, and catalog operations, and has led National Diabetic Pharmacies and other health care businesses. In 1997, he founded Morgan Noble Healthcare Partners, a private company that invests in healthcare services and healthcare technology, which has invested in companies like Privia Healthcare, Captify Health, and Carestream Health.

In 2005, he founded MainStreet Lender, which provides lending services for small business borrowers.

== Personal life ==
He is married to Mary Haft.

In 2007, he donated $2 million to the Wharton School of the University of Pennsylvania to establish the Robert Haft Entrepreneur-in-Residence Endowment Fund.

He is additionally on the board of directors for Canadian book company Indigo.
