= Total Wine & More =

American alcohol retail business

- Type: Private
- Industry: Retail
- Founded: 1991; 35 years ago (as Liquor World); Claymont, Delaware, U.S.
- Founders: David Trone; Robert Trone
- Headquarters: North Bethesda, Maryland, U.S.
- Number of locations: 250 stores (2023)
- Products: Wine, spirits, beer, cigars, gifts, accessories
- Revenue: ▲US$6 billion (2023)
- Total equity: US$2.4 billion (2022)
- Number of employees: 7,000+ (estimated)
- Website: totalwine.com

Total Wine & More is an American alcohol retailer founded and led by brothers David and Robert Trone. The company was named Retailer of the Year by Market Watch in 2006, Beverage Dynamics in 2008, and Wine Enthusiast Magazine in 2004 and 2014. The company is headquartered in North Bethesda, Maryland.

== History ==
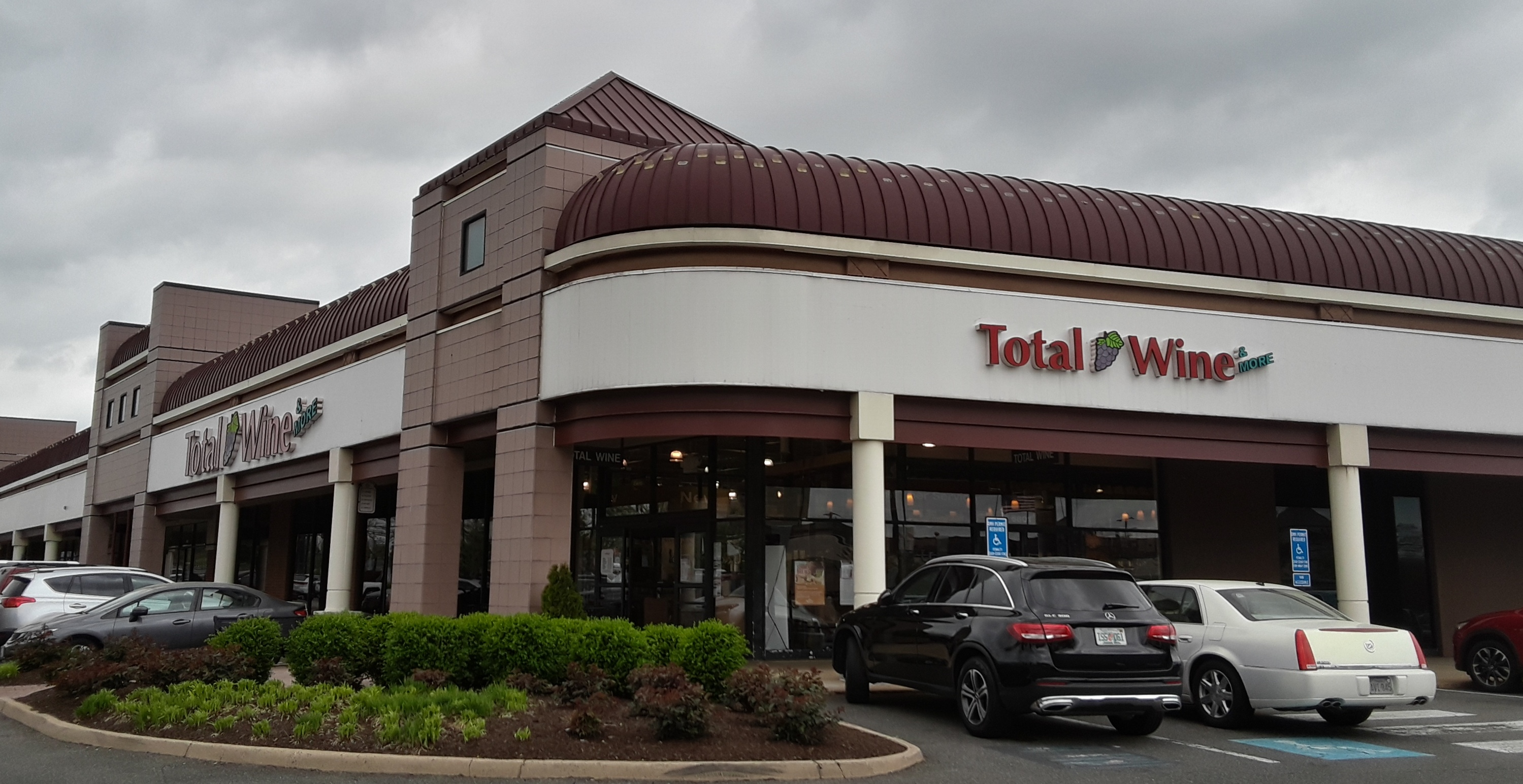
A Total Wine & More outlet in Springfield, Virginia

In 1984, Trone family members opened a store called Beer and Soda Warehouse. In 1985 they opened a store in the Pittsburgh area known as Beer and Pop Warehouse and later Beer World, though legal difficulties in Pennsylvania led them to leave the state.

In 1991 brothers David and Robert Trone founded Liquor World as a small, independent store in Claymont, Delaware, which was followed with a second store in Milltown, Delaware. Liquor World grew steadily through the 1990s, expanding down the east coast. The Trones acquired D.C.-area chain Total Beverage in 1998, adopting and modifying that company's moniker for their business. Total Wine entered Florida in 2005, and then California and Arizona in 2007.

In August 2016, the company agreed to stop selling alcohol in Connecticut below the state minimum prices, and paid a $37,500 fine. The same year, Total Wine was served with multi-day license suspensions by the Massachusetts Alcoholic Beverages Control Commission for selling liquor below its costs – a loss leader pricing strategy not allowed in some states. Total Wine sued the state's regulators to overturn the suspensions and won on the basis that the final cost of the liquor being less than that shown on the initial invoices.

The company has only one store in the state of New York. In 2017, the New York State Liquor Authority rejected the company's application for a 21,000-square-foot store near White Plains, New York, and in September 2019, a New York Supreme Court justice blocked the company's plan for a megastore in Hartsdale, in Westchester County, deeming it "inappropriate for the region"; the company is appealing that decision. Also in 2019, 31-year-old Michelle Trone, who is David Trone's daughter, applied to open a 30,000 square foot store in Queens, New York, saying it would be an independent store, though using the trade name "Total Wine & More".

In mid-March 2020, the company announced a $2-per-hour pay raise for its store employees amid the coronavirus pandemic in "recognition of the hard work [they] were doing"; in April, the company ended the pay increase because of "trends in the business and external environment".

As of October 2023, Total Wine has 259 stores in 28 states. It conducts online sales in 24 states that allow online alcohol sales. In October 2023, Bloomberg estimated Total Wine & More to be worth approximately $2.4 billion.

== Business operations ==
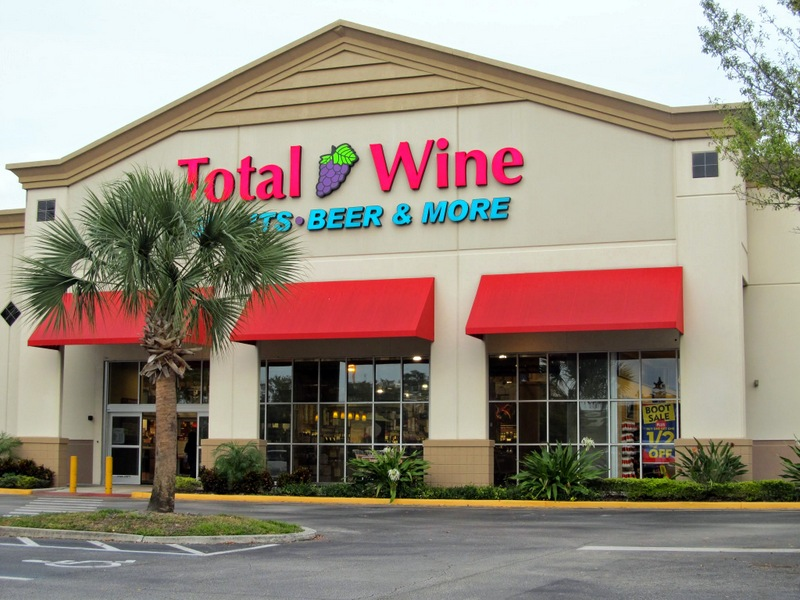
An outlet in Orlando, Florida

Owned and operated by Retail Services and Systems, Total Wine & More offers a large selection of products and advertises them as competitive in price. Each Total Wine store carries approximately 8,000 different wines from around the world, 3,000 types of spirits (where permitted by law), and 2,500 beers. Stores also carry accessories, gifts, and cigars.

As of 2018, the company had about 7,000 employees, including 500 employees at their corporate headquarters in Bethesda, Maryland, and 800 wine specialists.

Total Wine provides its customers with publications including separate guides to wine, beer, and spirits, and offers location-specific loyalty programs.

The company's 2014 revenue was estimated to be more than $1.5 billion. Co-owner David Trone said that year that the company planned to be at $2 billion in revenues in 2015, and to be over $3 billion in 2019. In February 2024, Forbes reported that the company had made $6 billion in revenues in 2023.

== Corporate philanthropy ==
Over the past two decades, according to the company, Total Wine has supported local, regional, and national charities with more than $100 million in in-kind and monetary donations. The company said that in 2018 that it had donated over $9 million to over 13,000 organizations in 23 states. Total Wine received the 2014 Market Watch Award for Community Service from Market Watch, a US alcoholic beverage industry publication. Wine Spectator editor Marvin Shanken said, "The level of time, energy and financial resources that David and Robert Trone have devoted to community service is truly remarkable."

== See also ==
- Tennessee Wine and Spirits Retailers Assn. v. Thomas
